= List of former Royal Air Force stations =

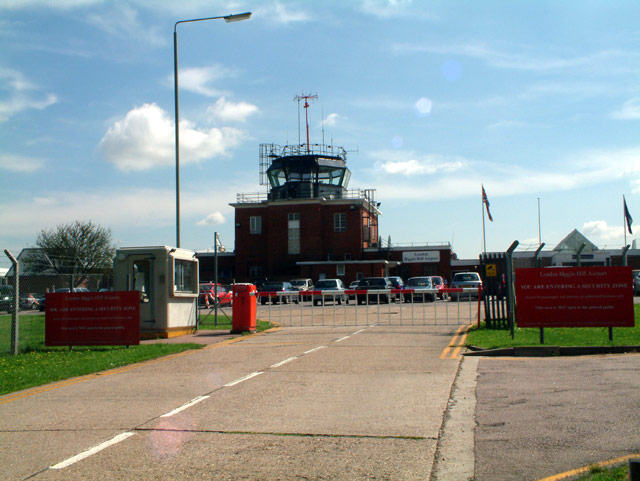
London Biggin Hill, a former RAF station

This list of former RAF stations includes most of the stations, airfields and administrative headquarters previously used by the Royal Air Force. They are listed under any former county or country name which was appropriate for the duration of operation.

During 1991, the RAF had several Military Emergency Diversion Aerodrome (MEDA) airfields: RAF Kinloss, Leeming, Valley, Waddington, Wattisham and Lyneham ended their role from 1 March 1991, leaving Brize Norton, Manston, Leuchars and St Mawgan with the role.

== British Isles ==
Station	Pundit Code/ USAAF station code	Country	County	Year opened	Year closed	Notes
RAF Abbots Bromley		England	Staffordshire	1940	1949	Returned to agricultural use, small number of buildings remain.
RAF Abbots Ripton		England	Huntingdonshire	1938	1942	Became part of RAF Alconbury.
RAF Abbotsinch		Scotland	Renfrewshire	1933	1943	Passed to Royal Navy / Fleet Air Arm in 1943, now Glasgow International Airport
RAF Aberporth		Wales	Ceredigion	1941	1984	Now West Wales Airport
RAF Abingdon	AB	England	Oxfordshire (Note: Berkshire 1932–1974)	1932	1992	Transferred to the British Army and became Dalton Barracks. Airfield continued to be used for RAF helicopter training and gliding.
RAF Acaster Malbis	AM	England	West Riding of Yorkshire	1942	1957	Returned to agricultural use, with elements as an industrial estate
RAF Acklington	AI	England	Northumberland	1916	1975	Situated just south of a World War I landing ground known as Southfields. Now His Majesty's Prison Northumberland (formerly Acklington and Castington)
RAF Akeman Street		England	Oxfordshire	1940	1947	Returned to agricultural use
RAF Aldeburgh		England	Suffolk	1918	1919	
RAF Aldergrove	JV	Northern Ireland	County Antrim	1918	2009	Became Aldergrove Flying Station
RAF Aldermaston	AM	England	Berkshire	1942	1950	Became part of the Atomic Weapons Research Establishment (AWRE), now Atomic Weapons Establishment (AWE)
RAF All Hallows		England	Kent	1916	1935	WWI Class 3 landing ground
RAF Alness	YS	Scotland	Ross and Cromarty	1920	1986	Named RAF Invergordon until 1943. Flying boat station, subsequently RAF Marine Branch No. 1100 MCU until disbandment.
RAF Anderby Creek		England	Lincolnshire	c.1939	c.1945	Second World War battle training school of the RAF Regiment; at or near Anderby Creek; no visible remains on satellite images
RAF Andrews Field	GZ	England	Essex	1943	1948	Originally known as RAF Great Saling
RAF Andover	AV	England	Hampshire	1917	1976	Now Marlborough Lines home to the HQ of the British Army
RAF Andreas	VS	Isle of Man		1941	1947	Remains in light use as a civilian airfield
RAF Angle	AE	Wales	Pembrokeshire	1941	1950	Returned to agricultural use
RAF Annan	AG	Scotland	Dumfriesshire	1942	1945	Since 1955 the site of Chapelcross nuclear power station, which is being decommissioned
RAF Ansty		England	Warwickshire	1936	1953	Occupied by Rolls-Royce as an engine overhaul and repair facility
RAF Anwick		England	Lincolnshire	1916	1918	Returned to agricultural use
RAF Appledram	AO (day)	England	Sussex	1943	1944	Advanced Landing Ground (ALG)
RAF Ascot		England	Berkshire	1916	1919	
RAF Ashbourne	AS	England	Derbyshire	1942	1954	In various uses, including by JCB as a test and demonstration area
RAF Ash		England	Kent	1986	1995	Site sold for civilian use, now a data centre.
RAF Ashford		England	Kent	1943	1944	ALG, near Egerton
RAF Aston Down	AD	England	Gloucestershire	1938	1976	In use as a civilian gliding airfield
RAF Atcham	AP	England	Shropshire	1941	1946	
RAF Atherstone		England	Warwickshire	1941	1942	Renamed RAF Stratford.
RAF Attlebridge	AT	England	Norfolk	1941	1956	
RAF Atwick		England	East Riding of Yorkshire	July 1915	1919	Hornsea Mere
RAF Ayr I		Scotland	Ayrshire	1917	1919	Originally and now Ayr Racecourse
RAF Ayr II	AR	Scotland	Ayrshire	1941	1957	Also known as RAF Heathfield. Passed to Royal Navy Fleet Air Arm 1944–46 as HMS Wagtail. Reopened 1951 as storage annexe to RAF Prestwick.
RAF Babbacombe		England	Devon	1940	1945	No. 1 Aircrew Receiving Centre, originally and now Babbacombe Theatre.
RAF Babdown Farm	BF	England	Gloucestershire	1940	1948	(Relief Landing Ground – RLG)
RAF Bacton		England	Norfolk	1915	1919	First World War landing ground
RAF Baginton	NG	England	Warwickshire	1939	1943	Originally and now Coventry Airport
RAF Balado Bridge		Scotland	Kinross-shire	1942	1944	Transferred to War Department 1944. Civil airfield 1946–1957.
RAF Balderton	BN	England	Nottinghamshire	1941	1954	
RAF Baldonnel		Republic of Ireland	Dublin	1917	1965	now Casement Aerodrome
RAF Ballyhalbert	YB	Northern Ireland	County Down	1941	1947	Briefly transferred to Royal Navy during 1945
RAF Ballykelly	IY	Northern Ireland	County Londonderry	1941	1971	Site transferred to Army as Shackleton Barracks. Aircraft facilities fully closed in 2007. Site remains mostly derelict as of 2025.
RAF Ballywalter		Northern Ireland	County Down	1941	1945	No. 16 Satellite Landing Ground
RAF Bampton Castle		England	Oxfordshire	1939	2003	established by Royal Signals Regiment, transferred to RAF Signals Command in 1965
RAF Banff	AF	Scotland	Banffshire	1943	1946	
RAF Bardney	BA	England	Lincolnshire	1943	1963	Built as a satellite to RAF Waddington
RAF Barkway		England	Hertfordshire	1942	2011	Communications station. Derelict as of 2025.
RAF Barnwood		England	Gloucestershire			RAF Record Office
RAF Barton Bendish		England	Norfolk	1939	1942	Second World War Landing Ground, as a satellite station to RAF Marham
RAF Barton Hall		England	Lancashire	1940	1975	During WWII: Operations Centre of No. 9 Group RAF. Post-war: Preston Air Traffic Control Centre.
RAF Bassingbourn	BS	England	Cambridgeshire	1938	1969	now Bassingbourn Barracks
RAF Bawdsey		England	Suffolk	1936	1991	Converted into a boarding school which operated between 1994 and 2016 and later a holiday park. Transmitter block now a radar museum.
RAF Bawtry		England	South Yorkshire	1941	1986	No. 1 Group Bomber Command H.Q. (during WWII), RAF Strike Command H.Q. & eventually RAF Meteorological Service H.Q. (post-war)
RAF Beaulieu	BL/BQ	England	Hampshire	1915	1947	Now a recreational area within the New Forrest.
RAF Beccles	BE	England	Suffolk	1943	1945	
RAF Bekesbourne		England	Kent	1916	1919 1940	Became Bekesbourne Aerodrome post-WWI, closed in July 1939. Used during May and June 1940 by No 2 and No 13 Squadrons.
RAF Belfast	Belfast	Northern Ireland		1941	1943	Acquired as Sydenham Airport, transferred to RN in 1943 as HMS Gadwall; reverted from RNAS back to RAF 1973 and closed in 1978.
RAF Bellasize		England	East Riding of Yorkshire	1916	1945	Used between 1916 and 1919, reactivated for flying training between 1939, and 1945
RAF Belton Park		England	Lincolnshire	1942	1946	Birthplace and original headquarters / training facility of the Royal Air Force Regiment
RAF Bembridge		England	Isle of Wight	1915	1920	Seaplane base, also known as RNAS Bembridge Harbour
RAF Benbecula	BB	Scotland	Inverness-shire	1941	1947	Airfield now Benbecula Airport. Nearby radar station now RRH Benbecula, an unmanned Remote Radar Head controlled by RAF Boulmer.
RAF Bentley Priory		England	Middlesex	1926	2008	Converted to residential use. WW2 bunker, modernised in the 1980s, was demolished and filled in, as regarded not worth saving. Former Officers' Mess now the Bentley Priory Museum.
RAF Bentwaters	BY	England	Suffolk	1944	1993	Former major USAF base. Site sold and became a business park and TV/film location known as Bentwaters Parks with airfield infrastructure and buildings remaining. Bentwaters Cold War Museum opened in 2007. Former USAF housing demolished and a new housing estate created.
RAF Berrow		England	Worcestershire	1941	1945	No. 5 SLG also known as Pendock Moor
RAF Bibury	BI	England	Gloucestershire	1940	1945	built as a relief landing ground for RAF South Cerney
RAF Bicester	BC	England	Oxfordshire	1917	1976	now Bicester Airfield and home to Bicester Heritage
RAF Biggin Hill		England	Kent	1917	1992	Formerly the Officer and Aircrew Selection Centre (OASC) before moving to RAF Cranwell in the early 1990s, now Biggin Hill Airport.
RAF Binbrook	BK	England	Lincolnshire	1940	1992	Site sold, technical buildings and hangars in use as an industrial park, domestic site established as Brookenby village.
RAF Binsoe		England	North Yorkshire	1916	1919	Used as a relief landing ground for RAF Ripon
RAF Birch	BR	England	Essex	1942	1945	
RAF Bircham Newton		England	Norfolk	1918	1966	Technical site now the Construction Industry Training Board School
RAF Bircotes	BH	England	South Yorkshire	1941	1948	Satellite airfield for RAF Finningley.
RAF Bishopbriggs		Scotland	Dunbartonshire	1939	1966	Originally a barrage balloon depot, later used for other non-flying purposes. Site now HM Prison Low Moss
RAF Bishops Court	IC	Northern Ireland	County Down	1943	1990	Originally an airfield but latterly a radar site.
RAF Bisterne	BS	England	Hampshire	1943	1945	USAAF ALG
RAF Bitteswell	BT	England	Leicestershire	1940	1947	
RAF Blaenannerch		Wales	Ceredigion	1939	1941	Renamed RAF Aberporth, now West Wales Airport
RAF Black Isle		Scotland	Ross and Cromarty	1941	1945	No. 42 Satellite Landing Ground
RAF Blackbushe		England	Hampshire	1944	1960	Now Blackbushe Airport
RAF Blackpool		England	Lancashire	1940	1945	HQ was located at the Lansdowne Hotel on the North Shore
RAF Blakehill Farm	XF	England	Wiltshire	1944	1952	Also known as RAF Cricklade
RAF Blakelaw		England	Northumberland	1940	1943	HQ No. 13 Group RAF also known as RAF Newcastle
RAF Blankney Hall		England	Lincolnshire	1940	1946	RAF Digby Sector operations room. Now demolished & site of a golf club.
RAF Blyton	AL	England	Lincolnshire	1942	1954	Now known the site of Blyton Park Driving Centre and is used for motorsport and track days.
RAF Boa Island		Northern Ireland	County Fermanagh	1944	1945	Satellite to RAF Killadeas flying boat station. Also known as Rock Bay.
RAF Bobbington		England	Staffordshire	1941	1956	Renamed RAF Halfpenny Green in 1943, now Wolverhampton Airport
RAF Boddington		England	Gloucestershire	1940	2007	Transferred to Defence Communication Services Agency (now Information Systems & Services) as ISS Boddington
RAF Bodney	BO	England	Norfolk	1940	1945	USAAF from 1943
RAF Bodorgan		Wales	Anglesey	1940	1945	No. 15 SLG, originally called Aberffraw until 15 May 1941
RAF Bognor		England	Sussex	1943	1944	ALG
RAF Bolt Head	OH	England	Devon	1941	1945	Second World War satellite airfield to RAF Exeter
RAF Booker		England	Buckinghamshire	1939	1951	near (High Wycombe), now Wycombe Air Park
RAF Boreham	JM	England	Essex	1944	1945	
RAF Boscombe Down	BD	England	Wiltshire	1917	2001	Airfield retained by the Ministry of Defence but operated by private contractor QinetiQ as MOD Boscombe Down. Home to the Aircraft Test and Evaluation Centre and Empire Test Pilots School (ETPS).
RAF Bottesford	AQ	England	Leicestershire	1941	1945	
RAF Bottisham	IM	England	Cambridgeshire	1940	1946	Largely now agricultural use and divided north–south by the A14. The North East corner of the airfield is now the Bottisham Airfield Museum.
RAF Boulmer		England	Northumberland	1940		RAF Boulmer remains open, but the present radar control station is at a different location from the wartime airfield (which closed in the late 1960s). During the 1970s the former airfield communal site was redeveloped as an air-sea rescue helicopter base, which closed in 2015.
RAF Bourn	AU	England	Cambridgeshire	1941	1948	Became a recreational airfield, but is now planned to be developed into a village of 3500 homes.
RAF Bovingdon	BV	England	Hertfordshire	1942	1972	Now site of Bovingdon Radar, a major air navigation facility for London Heathrow Airport and the surrounding airspace.
RAF Bowmore		Scotland	Argyllshire	1940	1945	Flying boat base, satellite to RAF Oban
RAF Boxted	BX	England	Essex	1943	1947	A small museum is located on side of airfield.
RAF Bracebridge Heath		England	Lincolnshire	1916	1920	Adjacent to RAF Waddington. Site used to for the recovery and restoration damaged Lancaster bomber parts for reuse in WWII & construction site of Avro 707 prototype aircraft.
RAF Brackla		Scotland	Nairnshire	1941	1947	
RAF Staff College Bracknell		England	Berkshire	1945	1997	Joint Services Command and Staff College established at the site, which later moved to MOD Shrivenham. The site was subsequently sold for redevelopment in 2004.
RAF Bradwell Bay		England	Essex	1941	1945	
RAF Bramcote	RT	England	Warwickshire	1940	1946	Transferred to the Royal Navy in 1947 and became HMS Gamecock and in 1959 was transferred to the Army as Gamecock Barracks
RAF Brampton		England	Huntingdonshire	1942	2012	Transferred to Joint Forces Command and became Brampton Camp RAF Wyton. Site subsequently sold for redevelopment and station buildings demolished.
RAF Brampton Wyton Henlow		England	Cambridgeshire and Bedfordshire	2001	2012	Tri-base area (also RAF Stanbridge not formally noted in name)
RAF Bratton		England	Shropshire	1940	1945	Relief landing ground of RAF Shawbury & Home of RAF Training Command, 25 Group Advanced Flying Unit
RAF Brawdy	BW	Wales	Pembrokeshire	1944	1992	Transferred to the British Army in 1995 and became Cawdor Barracks.
RAF Breighton	AC	England	Yorkshire	1942	1946	
RAF Brenzett		England	Kent	1943	1944	ALG, also known as Ivychurch
RAF Bridgnorth		England	Shropshire	1940		Former recruit training establishment
RAF Bridlington		England	East Riding of Yorkshire	1929	1980	Air gunnery and wireless operator courses held during the Second World War; No. 1104 MCU operated between 1929 and 1980
RAF Brizlee Wood		England	Northumberland	1968	1969	NATO forward Scatter Unit. transferred to the Royal Signals Regiment in 1969.
RAF Broadwell	JR	England	Oxfordshire	1943	1947	
Brough Aerodrome		England	East Riding of Yorkshire			
RAF Bruntingthorpe	BP	England	Leicestershire	1942	1962	now Bruntingthorpe Aerodrome and Proving Ground
RAF Brunton	BN	England	Northumberland	1942	1945	Built as satellite to RAF Milfield. Post-war use as GA field and parachute club base ceased by 2004. Disused apart from a small air defence radar outstation of RAF Boulmer.
RAF Buckminster		England	Lincolnshire	1916	1919	First World War Royal Flying Corps base
RAF Bungay	JO	England	Suffolk	1942	1955	Locally known as RAF Flixton. Allocated to USAAF & designated Station 125 during the Second World War. Following the war the station was transferred to the Royal Navy in 1945 to become HMS Europa, before control was returned to the RAF in 1946.
RAF Burgh Castle		England	Norfolk	1915	1919	First World War Landing Ground (Royal Naval Air Service)
RAF Burnaston		England	Derbyshire	1939	1953	Previously and later Derby Airport. Now a Toyota car plant.
RAF Burtonwood		England	Cheshire	1940	1994	Buildings demolished and site sold for redevelopment, including Omega Business Park and junction 8 of the M62 motorway.
RAF Burn	AZ	England	Yorkshire	1942	1945	
RAF Bury St Edmunds	BU	England	Suffolk	1942	1948	Also designated to USAAF Station 468 at some point in WWII
RAF Butley		England	Suffolk	1942	1943	Former name for RAF Bentwaters
RAF Buttergask		Scotland	Perthshire	1941	1945	Relief landing ground for RAF Perth
RAF Bylaugh Hall		England	Norfolk	1943	1945	No. 100 (Bomber Support) Group H.Q.
RAF Caerau		Wales	Cardiff	1939	1944	HQ No. 14 Balloon Unit (and HQ Cardiff Group Royal Observer Corps from 1953 to 1968). Name changed to RAF Llandaff in 1946.
RAF Caerwent		Wales	Monmouthshire	1967	1993	Transferred to the Defence Training Estate and became the Caerwent Training Area, predominately used by the British Army.
RAF Caistor		England	Lincolnshire	1940	1963	Now returned to agricultural use
RAF Calshot	KT	England	Hampshire	1913	1961	Was No. 238 Maintenance Unit RAF (238MU). Maintained Air Sea Rescue launches. RAF Mount Batten took over this work upon closure.
RAF Calveley	KY	England	Cheshire	1942	1946	
RAF Cambridge		England	Cambridgeshire	1938	1954	RAF use of Marshalls airfield at Teversham, now Cambridge Airport
RAF Cammeringham		England	Lincolnshire	1942	1945	(previously RAF Ingham)
RAF Cardington		England	Bedfordshire	1915	2000	Sold for residential redevelopment and various private uses. Former airship sheds remain and are designated as listed buildings. Part of the site is retained by the Ministry of Defence and leased to the Met Office.
RAF Carew Cheriton		Wales	Pembrokeshire	1939	1945	
RAF Cark	KA	England	Lancashire	1941	1945	
RAF Carnaby	KQ	England	Yorkshire	1944	1963	
RAF Castle Archdale	QA	Northern Ireland	County Fermanagh	1941	1958	Flying boat station. Briefly known as RAF Loch Erne between 1941 – 1943.
RAF Castle Bromwich		England	Warwickshire	1915	1958	was the Castle Bromwich Aerodrome until 1958
RAF Castle Camps	CC	England	Cambridgeshire	1940	1946	
RAF Castle Combe		England	Wiltshire	1941	1948	Second World War Practice Landing Ground for RAF Hullavington. Now Castle Combe Circuit.
RAF Castle Donington	CD	England	Leicestershire	1943	1946	Satellite airfield to RAF Wymeswold. Now East Midlands Airport.
RAF Castle Kennedy	QK	Scotland	Wigtownshire	1941	1945	Since 2004, Castle Kennedy has been made available for use General Aviation and commercial use within the applicable regulations. The airfield is unlicensed, and used at the pilots own risk and discretion. The airfield is strictly PPR.
RAF Castletown	AX	Scotland	Caithness	1940	1945	
RAF Catfirth		Scotland	Shetland	1917	1919	
RAF Catfoss	CA	England	Yorkshire	1932	1963	
RAF Catterick	AK	England	Yorkshire	1914	1994	Transferred to the British Army and became Marne Barracks.
RAF Cattewater		England	Devon	1918	1923	Formally Royal Naval Air Station Cattewate (1913–18). Re-opened in 1928 as RAF Mount Batten.
RAF Caxton Gibbet		England	Cambridgeshire	1940	1944	RLG
RAF Chailey		England	Sussex	1943	1945	ALG
RAF Chalgrove		England	Oxfordshire	1943	1947	Leased to ejection seat manufacturer Martin-Baker and known as Chalgrove Airfield. Ownership transferred to Homes England in 2016 with intention of redeveloping for 3,000 homes.
RAF Charlton Horethorne		England	Somerset	1941	1942	later RNAS Charlton Horethorne (HMS Heron II)
RAF Charmy Down	CH	England	Somerset	1940	1946	
RAF Charterhall	KH	Scotland	Berwickshire	1942	1946	
RAF Chattis Hill		England	Hampshire	1917	1919	
RAF Cheadle		England	Staffordshire	1939	1964	Operations transferred to Government Communications Headquarters (GCHQ) and station became known as GCHQ Cheadle.
RAF Chedburgh	CU	England	Suffolk	1942	1952	Near Bury St Edmunds
RAF Cheddington	CZ	England	Buckinghamshire	1942	1952	USAAF from 1944
RAF Chedworth	YW	England	Gloucestershire	1942	1950	Primarily used for training. Now primarily agricultural land.
RAF Chelveston	CV	England	Northamptonshire	1941	1962	USAAF from 1944
RAF Cherhill		England	Wiltshire	1954	1958	Formerly and later RAF Yatesbury.
RAF Chepstow		Wales	Monmouthshire	1941	1945	Satellite Landing Ground, initially for No. 19 Maintenance Unit RAF (MU) at St. Athan before switching to the control of No 38 MU at Llandow.
RAF Chesil Bank		England	Dorset			Second World War Bombing Ranges Unit with an Emergency Landing Ground
RAF Chessington		England	Surrey	1938	1985	Formerly a Balloon station, latterly a research Hospital
RAF Chicksands		England	Bedfordshire	1936	1997	Transferred to the British Army and became the Defence Intelligence and Security Centre (DISC) and the headquarters of the Intelligence Corps. Now the Joint Intelligence Training Group (JITG).
RAF Chigwell		England	Essex	1933	1958	Barrage balloon site
RAF Chilbolton	CI	England	Hampshire	1940	1945	
RAF Chilmark		England	Wiltshire	1937	1995	Retained by the Ministry of Defence and later sold for various civilian uses.
RAF Chipping Norton		England	Oxfordshire	1940	1945	Satellite station primarily used for training
RAF Chipping Ongar	JC	England	Essex	1943	1946	USAAF from 1944
RAF Chipping Warden	CW	England	Oxfordshire	1941	1946	
RAF Chivenor	IV	England	Devon	1940	1995	Transferred to the Royal Marines and became RMB Chivenor.
RAF Christchurch	CH	England	Hampshire	1940	1945	known as Christchurch Airfield in peacetime between 1926 and 1966.
RAF Church Broughton	CB	England	Derbyshire	1942	1963	Opened as a satellite station of RAF Lichfield
RAF Church Fenton	CF	England	North Yorkshire	1937	2013	Site sold and became Leeds East Airport.
RAF Church Lawford	CL	England	Warwickshire	1941	1955	
RAF Church Stanton		England	Somerset	1941	1943	renamed RAF Culmhead
RAF Cleave		England	Cornwall	1939	1945	(GCHQ CSO Morwenstow)
RAF Cluntoe	UK	Northern Ireland	County Tyrone	1942	1955	near Ardboe
RAF Clyffe Pypard		England	Wiltshire	1941	1947	Used as accommodation for by RAF Lyneham and later used by the British Army for battle practice until 1961. Now reclaimed as agricultural land.
RAF Coal Aston		England	Yorkshire	1918	1920	Opened as a Royal Flying Corps airfield in 1916
RAF Coleby Grange	CG	England	Lincolnshire	1940	1946	
RAF Colerne	CQ	England	Wiltshire	1940	1976	Transferred to the British Army and became Azimghur Barracks. Airfield retained for occasional flying.
RAF Collinstown		Republic of Ireland	Dublin	1918	1922	now Dublin Airport.
RAF Collyweston		England	Northamptonshire	1918	1941	Landing ground, consumed when absorbed by the westerly runway extension at RAF Wittering to the east
RAF Coltishall	CS	England	Norfolk	1938	2006	Site sold for redevelopment including construction of HM Prison Bure and a solar farm. Majority of the station now designated as a conservation area and known as Scottow Enterprise Park. Former married quarters now known as Badersfield.
RAF Compton Basset		England	Wiltshire	1940	1947	
RAF Condover	DV	England	Shropshire	1942	1945	Satellite station of RAF Shawbury & Relief Landing Ground for RAF Ternhill. Primarily use for fighter pilots training by both RAF & USAAF.
RAF Connel	KO	Scotland	Argyllshire		1945	Now Oban Airport.
RAF Cookstown		Republic of Ireland	Dublin (now South County Dublin).	1918	1922	now Cookstown Industrial Estate. *Aerodrome buildings were used by Urney's Chocolate factory for a period.
RAF Coolham	XQ	England	Sussex	1943	1944	ALG
RAF Copmanthorpe		England	Yorkshire	1918	1919	Opened as a Royal Flying Corps airfield in 1916
RAF Corsewall		Scotland	Wigtownshire	1942	1947	Marine Craft Training School
RAF Cottam	CM	England	Yorkshire	1939	1954	Satellite station to RAF Driffield
RAF Cottesmore	CT	England	Rutland	1938	2012	Transferred to the British Army and became Kendrew Barracks.
RAF Cottenham		England	Cambridgeshire	1918	1919	Former Royal Flying Corps airfield opened in 1916 as a night landing ground
RAF Covehithe		England	Suffolk	1918	1919	Former Royal Naval Air Service airfield opened in 1915
RAF Cowden		England	Yorkshire	1950	1998	Bombing range
RAF Crail		Scotland	Fife	1918	1919	Reopened by Royal Naval Fleet Air Arm in 1940
RAF Cramlington		England	Northumberland	1918	1919	Opened as a Royal Flying Corps airfield in 1915
RAF Cranage	RG	England	Cheshire	1940	1945	
RAF Cranfield	CX	England	Bedfordshire	1937	1952	Now Cranfield University and Cranfield Airport
RAF Credenhill		England	Herefordshire	1940	1994	Transferred to the British Army and became Stirling Lines.
RAF Croft	CR	England	Yorkshire	1941	1956	Now Croft Circuit
RAF Croft		England	Cheshire	1956	1959	originally accommodation for Fleet Air Arm base HMS Gosling (1942-1950s), the station was used as a processing & billeting centre for personnel traveling between the UK and US by USAF Burtonwood.
RAF Crosby on Eden	KX	England	Cumbria	1941	1944	Now Carlisle Lake District Airport
RAF Croydon		England	Surrey	1916	1946	Later Croydon Airport, now a retail/industrial estate
RAF Culham		England	Oxfordshire	1940	1953	as RNAS Culham
RAF Culmhead	UC	England	Somerset	1941	1946	
RAF Dalcross	DZ	Scotland	Inverness-shire	1941	1953	Now Inverness Airport
RAF Dale		Wales	Pembrokeshire	1942	1943	became RNAS Dale (HMS Goldcrest)
RAF Dallachy	DI	Scotland	Banffshire	1943	1945	
RAF Dalton	DA	England	Yorkshire	1941	1945	
RAF Darley Moor	DM	England	Derbyshire	1942	1955	Now Darley Moor Airfield
RAF Davidstow Moor	DD	England	Cornwall	1942	1945	
RAF Daws Hill		England	Buckinghamshire	1944	2007	Site sold for residential redevelopment, most station buildings demolished, former bunker now listed.
RAF Deanland		England	Sussex	1943	1944	ALG
RAF Debach	DC	England	Suffolk	1944	1945	(USAAF)
RAF Debden	DB	England	Essex	1937	1975	Used by both US 8th Air Force and RAF Fighter Command in Second World War. Now home to HQ Essex Wing RAF Air Cadets and Carver Barracks (Army).
RAF Deenethorpe	DP	England	Northamptonshire	1943	1946	
RAF Defford	DF	England	Worcestershire	1941	1957	RAF Defford museum is now housed within the National Trust property of Croome.
RAF Denham		England	Buckinghamshire	1915	1940s	Flight training base, now Denham Aerodrome
RAF Deopham Green	DG	England	Norfolk	1944	1948	Assigned to USAAF & designated Station 142
RAF Desborough	DS	England	Northamptonshire	1944	1948	Assigned to USAAF
RAF Desford		England	Leicestershire	1916	1953	Owned by Caterpillar Inc. since 1953, now an industrial site.
RAF Detling		England	Kent	1916	1959	
RAF Digby	DJ	England	Lincolnshire	1918	1953	Known as RAF Scopwick (1918–1920), Joint Service Signals Organisation Digby from 1998.
RAF Dishforth	DH	England	North Yorkshire	1936	1992	Transferred to the British Army's Army Air Corps and became Dishforth Airfield.
RAF Docking	DK	England	Norfolk	1940	1958	Satellite station of RAF Bircham Newton, returned to agricultural use.
RAF Doncaster		England	Yorkshire	1916	1954	formerly RFC Doncaster (1914) Royal Flying Corps
RAF Donibristle		Scotland	Fife	1917	1939	Opened by Royal Naval Air Service in 1917 and returned to the Royal Navy (Fleet Air Arm) in 1939 as HMS Merlin RNAS Donibristle
RAF Donna Nook	ZN	England	Lincolnshire	1927	1999	now MOD Air Weapons Range
RAF Dornoch		Scotland	Sutherland	1941	1945	No. 40 Satellite Landing Ground.
RAF Dounreay	DN	Scotland	Caithness	1944	1954	Airfield built for RAF but not used. Transferred to Royal Navy later in 1944 but never commissioned, and subsequently returned to Air Ministry. Never having become operational, it closed in 1954 and the northern area was absorbed by the Dounreay Nuclear Power Development Establishment.
RAF Dover		England	Kent	1918	1919	Airship and seaplane base
RAF Down Ampney	XA	England	Gloucestershire	1944	1946	
RAF Downham Market	DO	England	Norfolk	1942	1946	
RAF Drem	DE	Scotland	East Lothian	1916	1946	World War I landing ground known as West Fenton and subsequently RAF Gullane, which closed in 1919. Reopened as RAF Drem in 1939. Passed to Royal Navy as HMS Nighthawk in 1945–46.
RAF Driffield	DR	England	East Riding of Yorkshire	1918	1977	Formerly RAF Eastburn. Now British Army, Alamein Barracks.
RAF Dumfries	DU	Scotland	Dumfriesshire	1940	1957	aka RAF Tinwald Downs, now Dumfries and Galloway Aviation Museum
RAF Dundee		Scotland	Angus	1914	1919	Seaplane base inherited from Royal Naval Air Service in 1918, also known as Stannergate. Reopened by Royal Navy in 1940.
RAF Dundonald		Scotland	Ayrshire	1940	1945	
RAF Dunholme Lodge	DL	England	Lincolnshire	1943	1964	
RAF Dunino		Scotland	Fife	1941	1942	became RNAS Dunino (HMS Jackdaw II) in 1942
RAF Dunkeswell	DW	England	Devon	1943	1949	USN from 1944
RAF Dunsfold		England	Surrey	1942	1945	later BAE Systems Dunsfold, now Dunsfold Aerodrome, and Top Gear studio and race track
RAF Durrington		England	West Sussex	1941		Radar station. The former GCI radar station is being used as Palatine School, a school for those with special educational needs. The site underwent a major redevelopment in 2006 and was extended from the radar station building to accommodate more pupils.
RAF Duxford	DX	England	Cambridgeshire	1918	1963	Put on Care and Maintenance from end of First World War in 1918 until the formation of RAF Fighter Command. Used by Both RAF Fighter Command and the US 8th Air Force during the Second World War, then home to RAF Strike Command until closure. Now operated by the Imperial War Museum Duxford since falling derelict after making 'The Battle of Britain' film in 1968.
RAF Dyce	DY	Scotland	Aberdeenshire	1937	1957	Opened in 1934 as Aberdeen Airport, which it remains.
RAF Dymchurch		England	Kent	1915	1920	Balloon station, also aircraft. Site considered for WWII ALG
RAF Earls Colne	EC	England	Essex	1943	1947	now Earls Colne Airfield
RAF Eastbourne		England	Sussex	1914	1920	
RAF East Fortune	EF	Scotland	East Lothian	1916	1960	Former Royal Naval Air Service station. Closed 1920 but reopened 1940.
RAF East Kirkby	EK	England	Lincolnshire	1943	1970	
RAF East Moor	EM	England	Yorkshire	1942	1946	RCAF from 1944
RAF East Wretham	UT	England	Norfolk	1940	1946	USAAF from 1944
RAF Eastchurch		England	Kent	1912	1947	Now HMP Stamford Hill
RAF Eastleigh (known as RAF Southampton from 1936, to avoid confusion versus RAF Eastleigh (Nairobi))		England	Hampshire	1910	1920 1961	Was RNAS Raven when operated by the Royal Navy in WW2, reopened 1961, now Southampton Airport
RAF Edlesborough		England	Buckinghamshire	c. 1939	2012	Communications site satellite of RAF Stanbridge
RAF Edgehill	EH	England	Oxfordshire	1941	1953	Gliding Club and Kart Track
RAF Edzell	EZ	Scotland	Angus	1940	1997	World War 1 airfield nearby operated 1918–19. New airfield opened 1940. Flying ceased 1957, thereafter to United States Navy for electronic surveillance, now in private use as a materials storage area.
RAF Eglinton	QM	Northern Ireland	County Londonderry	1941	1943	To Fleet Air Arm in 1943 as HMS Gannet. Now City of Derry Airport, Derry
RAF Elgin		Scotland	Morayshire	1940	1947	
RAF Elsham Wolds	ES	England	Lincolnshire	1941	1947	
RAF Elvington	EV	England	Yorkshire	1942	1958	Airfield retained until 1992 as a relief landing ground for RAF flying training schools at Church Fenton and Linton-on-Ouse, later sold in 1999. Technical site preserved as Yorkshire Air Museum, which opened in 1986.
RAF Ely		Wales	South Glamorgan			No. 14 Balloon Centre Cardiff
RAF Hospital Ely		England	Cambridgeshire	1939	1992	Transferred to NHS as Princess of Wales Hospital, Ely.
RAF Elmdon		England	Warwickshire	1939	1946	Previously and now Birmingham Airport
RAF Enstone	EN	England	Oxfordshire	1942	1947	now Enstone Airfield
RAF Errol	ER	Scotland	Perthshire	1942	1948	
RAF Eshott		England	Northumberland	1942	1945	
RAF Evanton	ET	Scotland	Ross and Cromarty	1922	1944	Known as RAF Novar until 1937. Transferred to Royal Navy as HMS Fieldfare
RAF Exeter	EX	England	Devon	1937	1946	Previously and now Exeter International Airport
RAF Eye	EY	England	Suffolk	1944	1945	USAAF. Now an industrial estate.
RAF Fairoaks		England	Surrey	1937	1967	Now Fairoaks Airport
RAF Fairlop		England	Essex	1941	1945	
RAF Fairwood Common	FC	Wales	West Glamorgan	1941	1946	Now Swansea Airport
RAF Faldingworth	FH	England	Lincolnshire	1943	1972	Now operated as a Government test facility for munitions.
RAF Farnborough		England	Hampshire	1911	1996	Former Royal Aircraft Establishment Farnborough, now Farnborough Airport
RAF Fauld		England	Staffordshire		1973	Underground bomb stores, see RAF Fauld Explosion of December 1944
RAF Fazakerley		England	Lancashire			
RAF Fearn		Scotland	Ross and Cromarty	1941	1942	Transferred to Royal Navy in 1942 as HMS Owl.
RAF Felixstowe		England	Suffolk	1913	1962	
RAF Fersfield	WF	England	Norfolk	1944	1945	(USAAF)
RAF Filey Town		England	Yorkshire			
RAF Filton		England	Gloucestershire	1916	1957	Later Bristol Filton Airport, now closed
RAF Findo Gask	FG	Scotland	Perthshire	1941	1948	Originally no. 25 Satellite Landing Ground, but later developed into full aerodrome.
RAF Finmere	FI	England	Buckinghamshire	1941	1945	
RAF Finningley	FB	England	Yorkshire	1915	1996	Later Doncaster Sheffield Airport, closed 2022
RAF Firbeck		England	Yorkshire	1940	1945	
RAF Fiskerton	FN	England	Lincolnshire	1943	1945	
RAF Flowerdown		England	Hampshire	1919	1929	Later HMS Flowerdown until 1956 and GCHQ until 1979. One of the Y-stations. Now Sir John Moore Barracks, Army Training Regiment
RAF Folkestone		England	Kent	1915	1918	Airship station, previously RNAS Capel-le-Ferne. Site used for a wireless station during WWII
RAF Folkingham	FO/FK (USAAF)	England	Lincolnshire	1943	1963	(USAAF 1944–1945)
RAF Ford		England	Sussex	1918	1920 1940	Became HMS Peregrine in 1940, now HM Prison Ford
RAF Fordoun	FR	Scotland	Kincardineshire	1942	1950	
RAF Foreland		England	Isle of Wight	1918	1919	Seaplane base
RAF Forres		Scotland	Morayshire	1940	1944	Transferred to War Department in 1944.
RAF Foulsham	FU	England	Norfolk	1942	1945	
RAF Fowlmere	FW	England	Cambridgeshire	1918	1945	Returned to agriculture following the end of First World War. Reactivated at the outbreak of Second World War in 1939. Used by US 8th Air Force and RAF Fighter Command during Second World War. Returned to agriculture at the end of hostilities.
RAF Framlingham	FM	England	Suffolk	1943	1945	USAAF. Also known as RAF Parham. Returned to agriculture and small industrial estate; control tower now Parham Airfield Museum.
RAF Fraserburgh	FB	Scotland	Aberdeenshire	1941	1945	
RAF Freckleton		England	Lancashire	1953	1962	Operated as a Medical Training Unit. Originally part of RAF Warton, but, in 1947, following the sale of the main Warton Airfield site to the English Electric Company, the site used as a Medical Training Unit became part of RAF Lytham. When RAF Lytham closed in 1956, the site continued to offer Medical Training and was designated as RAF Freckleton.
RAF Freiston		England	Lincolnshire	1916	1919	(formerly RNAS Freiston – became an RAF station in 1918)
RAF Friston		England	Sussex	1936	1945	
RAF Frost Hill Farm		England	Hampshire	1940	1945	ALG
RAF Fulbeck	FK/FB (USAAF)	England	Lincolnshire	1941	1970	(USAAF 1943–1944)
RAF Full Sutton	FS	England	Yorkshire	1944	1963	private flying and HM Prison Full Sutton
RAF Funtington		England	Sussex	1943	1944	ALG
RAF Gamston	GB	England	Nottinghamshire	1942	1957	now Retford Gamston Airport
RAF Gatwick		England	Surrey	1937	1946	Now London Gatwick Airport
RAF Gaydon		England	Warwickshire	1942	1974	Part of the site is now the Heritage Motor Centre
RAF Glatton	GT	England	Cambridgeshire	1943	1946	(USAAF)
RAF Gormanston		Republic of Ireland	County Meath	1917	Feb 1920	Now the Irish Army Gormanston Camp
RAF Gosfield		England	Essex	1943	1945	
RAF Gosport		England	Hampshire	1915	1945	Became HMS Siskin in 1945
RAF Goxhill	GX	England	Lincolnshire	1941	1953	(USAAF)
RAF Grafton Underwood	GU	England	Northamptonshire	1943	1959	(USAAF)
RAF Grain		England	Kent	1916	1924	Airship and seaplane base, also known as RAF Port Victoria
RAF Grangemouth		Scotland	Stirlingshire	1939	1955	Also known as Central Scotland Airport
RAF Gransden Lodge	GD	England	Bedfordshire	1942	1955	
RAF Grantham		England	Lincolnshire			(renamed RAF Spitalgate) – now a Territorial Army establishment
RAF Graveley	GR	England	Huntingdonshire	1942	1968	
RAF Gravesend		England	Kent	1937	1956	Now Riverview Park Housing Estate. Prior to WW2 was Gravesend Airport
RAF Great Ashfield	GA ?	England	Suffolk	1943	1960	(USAAF)
RAF Great Dunmow	GD	England	Essex	1943	1958	(USAAF)
RAF Great Massingham	GM	England	Norfolk	1940	1958	
RAF Great Sampford		England	Essex	1942	1948	(joint RAF/USAAF use)
RAF Great Witcombe		England	Gloucestershire	1942	1945?	Mainly as WRAF Signals Training
RAF Great Yarmouth		England	Norfolk			First World War landing ground
RAF Greatham		England	County Durham	1933	1958	Also known as RAF West Hartlepool
RAF Greatworth		England	Northamptonshire	1943	1992	HF Transmitter Site. Provided long range communications using Short Wave Transmitters. Sold for civilian uses and became Greatworth Park Business Park, utilising station buildings.
RAF Greencastle		Northern Ireland	County Down	1942	1945	(USAAF)
RAF Greenham Common		England	Berkshire	1942	1993	Technical site now a business park, with remainder of the station a public parkland known as Greenham and Crookham Commons.
RAF Greenland Top		England	Lincolnshire			(Also known as RAF Stallingborough)
RAF Greenock		Scotland	Renfrewshire	1940	1945	Flying boat maintenance facility
RAF Grimsby	GY	England	Lincolnshire	1941	1946	(aka RAF Waltham)
RAF Grimsetter		Scotland	Orkney	1940	1943	Also known as RAF Kirkwall. Transferred to Royal Navy in 1943 as HMS Robin. Now Kirkwall Airport.
RAF Grimsthorpe Park		England	Lincolnshire			
RAF Grove		England	Berkshire	1942	1946	(USAAF)
RAF Guston Road		England	Kent	1914	1919	see also Duke of York's Royal Military School, Dover
RAF Hack Green		England	Cheshire			now Hack Green Secret Nuclear Bunker
RAF Halesworth	HA	England	Suffolk	1942	1946	(USAAF)
RAF Halfpenny Green		England	Staffordshire	1941	1953	Formerly RAF Bobbington (now Wolverhampton Airport)
RAF Hall Caine		Isle of Man				Formerly Hall Caine Airport, now farmland
RAF Hospital Halton		England	Buckinghamshire	1927	1995	Demolished in 2008, site sold and redeveloped for housing. Not to be confused with RAF Halton.
RAF Hamble		England	Hampshire	1931	1978	
RAF Hammerwood		England	Sussex	1943	1944	ALG
RAF Hampstead Norris	HN	England	Berkshire			
RAF Hamworthy		England	Dorsetshire			
RAF Handforth		England	Cheshire			
RAF Hanworth		England	Surrey			
RAF Hardwick	HC	England	Norfolk	1942	1962	(USAAF)
RAF Harlaxton		England	Lincolnshire			
RAF Harling Road		England	Norfolk	1918	1920	First World War landing ground opened in 1916 and used by the Royal Flying Corps and the United States Army Air Corps
RAF Harpswell		England	Lincolnshire			(later renamed as RAF Hemswell)
RAF Harpur Hill		England	Derbyshire			Munitions storage depot
RAF Hartford Bridge		England	Hampshire	1941	1953	Later renamed RAF Blackbushe, now Blackbushe Airport
RAF Harrington		England	Northamptonshire	1943	1963	(USAAF)
RAF Harrogate		England	Yorkshire	1940	1994	Sold, buildings demolished and site redeveloped for housing.
RAF Harrowbeer	QB	England	Devon	1941	1950	
RAF Harwell	HW	England	Oxfordshire	1937	1945	
RAF Hatfield		England	Hertfordshire	1939	1956	RAF/ATA use of de Havilland's Hatfield Aerodrome
RAF Hatston		Scotland	Orkneys	1939	1945	Previously a civil site, the Royal Navy took it over as HMS Sparrowhawk, now agricultural with some light industry
RAF Haverfordwest		Wales	Pembrokeshire	1943	1956	
RAF Hawarden		Wales	Flintshire	1939	1957	48 MU Aircraft Storage Unit, now Hawarden Airport
RAF Hawkinge		England	Kent	1914	1963	
RAF Haydock		England	Lancashire			Also known as RAF Blackbrook
RAF Headcorn	HC	England	Kent	1943	1945	(USAAF ALG)
RAF Heath Row		England	Greater London			Now London Heathrow Airport
RAF Headley Court		England	Surrey	1946	1985	Subsequently, the Defence Medical Rehabilitation Centre operated by Defence Medical Services, part of Joint Forces Command. Now closed, DMRC relocating to a new site in Leicestershire.
RAF Helperby		England	North Yorkshire	1916	1947	First World War airfield, used as an ammunition dump in the Second World War
RAF Hednesford		England	Staffordshire	1938	1956	
RAF Helensburgh		Scotland	Dunbartonshire	1939	1945	Marine Aircraft Experimental Establishment
RAF Hell's Mouth		Wales	Gwynedd			
RAF Hemswell	HL	England	Lincolnshire	1937	1967	
RAF Hendon		England	Middlesex	1910	1957	Airfield redeveloped into Graham Park housing estate (early 1970s-on) and RAF Museum, London.
RAF Henley-on-Thames		England	Oxfordshire	1940	1945	
RAF Hereford		England	Herefordshire	1940	1994	Transferred to the British Army and became Stirling Lines.
RAF Heston		England	Middlesex			
RAF Hethel	HL	England	Norfolk	1942	1947	now owned by Lotus Cars
RAF Heywood		England	Lancashire			Maintenance Unit
RAF Hibaldstow		England	Lincolnshire	1941	1945	
RAF High Ercall		England	Shropshire	1941	1962	
RAF Highgate		England	Middlesex	1942	1948	Home to RAF Intelligence training during WW2. In former Caen Wood Towers (now Athlone House)
RAF High Halden	HH	England	Kent	1943	1944	(USAAF ALG)
RAF Hingham		England	Norfolk			First World War landing ground
RAF Hinstock		England	Shropshire	1941	1947	Co-located with RN Fleet Air Arm station HMS Godwit. Specialised in instrument and blind landing technologies.
RAF Hinton-in-the-Hedges	HI	England	Northamptonshire	1940	1945	now Hinton-in-the-Hedges Airfield
RAF Hixon	HX	England	Staffordshire	1942	1957	
RAF Hockley Heath		England	Warwickshire	1939	1948	
RAF Holbeach		England	Lincolnshire			Air Weapons Range
RAF Holme-on-Spalding Moor	HM	England	Yorkshire	1941	1953	
RAF Holmsley South	HM	England	Hampshire	1942	1946	
RAF Holt		England	Norfolk			First World War landing ground
RAF Honeybourne	HQ	England	Worcestershire	1941	1946	
RAF Honiley		England	Warwickshire	1941	1958	
RAF Hooton Park		England	Cheshire	1917	1957	
RAF Hopton		England	Suffolk			
RAF Horham	JH	England	Suffolk	1942	1963	(USAAF)
RAF Hornby Hall		England	Westmorland	1941	1945	No. 9 SLG
RAF Hornchurch	HO/HC	England	Essex	1928	1962	Formerly WW1 Flight Station of RFC/RAF Sutton's Farm
RAF Horne		England	Surrey	1943	1944	ALG
RAF Horsey Toll		England	Cambridgeshire	May 1930	1952	RLG/Civilian Repair Depot
RAF Horsham St Faith	HF	England	Norfolk	1940	1963	Now Norwich Airport
RAF Hucknall		England	Nottinghamshire	1916	1957	
RAF Hullavington		England	Wiltshire	1937	1993	Technical site transferred to the British Army and became Hullavington Barracks, later renamed Buckley Barracks in 2003. Airfield retained by the RAF for gliding operations and known as Hullavington Airfield, with flying ceasing in 2016 and the site sold to technology company Dyson.
RAF Hunmanby Moor		England	Yorkshire	1939	1945	Also known as RAF Filey Camp, later Butlin's Filey
RAF Hunsdon		England	Hertfordshire	1941	1947	
RAF Hurn	KU	England	Hampshire	1941	1944	Now Bournemouth Airport
RAF Husbands Bosworth	HZ	England	Leicestershire	1943	1956	Now agriculture, a gliding club is resident to the north of the public road that crosses the site from east to west.
RAF Hutton Cranswick	CK	England	Yorkshire	1942	1946	
RAF Hythe		England	Hampshire	1915	1919	
RAF Ibsley	IB	England	Hampshire	1941	1947	
RAF Immingham		England	Lincolnshire			(formerly RNAS Immingham – transferred to RAF in 1918)
RAF Ingham		England	Lincolnshire			(later named RAF Cammeringham)
RAF Innsworth		England	Gloucestershire	1940	2008	Was the RAF Records Centre, transferred to British Army and became NATO Station Innsworth, Imjin Barracks
RAF Isle of Grain		England	Kent			(pre-RAF) RNAS airship station, then RAF Isle of Grain
RAF Joyce Green		England	Kent	1914	1919	Coincidentally Vickers testing aerodrome 1910–1919
RAF Jurby		Isle of Man		1939	1972	
RAF Jurby Head		Isle of Man		1939	1993	Former inshore air weapons range. Ordnance periodically continues to be washed ashore onto adjacent beaches or brought up in fishing nets.
RAF Keevil		England	Wiltshire	1942	1965	
RAF Kelstern	KS	England	Lincolnshire	1943	1945	
RAF Kemble		England	Gloucestershire	1938	1984	
RAF Kenley		England	Croydon	1917	1974	Airfield retained by the Ministry of Defence and used for gliding. Some parts of former station sold for residential redevelopment.
RAF Kidbrooke		England	London	1917	1965	The site was mainly used as a stores, maintenance and training facility, and now is used for housing and schools.
RAF Kidlington		England	Oxfordshire	1938	1951	now Oxford Airport
RAF Kidsdale		Scotland	Wigtownshire	1937	1943	Joint RAF/Army gunnery range, 'Queen Bee' unmanned aircraft launch site – also known as Burrow Head. To War Department in 1943.
RAF Killadeas		Northern Ireland	County Fermanagh	1942	1947	
RAF Kimbolton	KI	England	Huntingdonshire	1941	1946	(USAAF)
RAF Kings Cliffe		England	Northamptonshire	1941	1959	(USAAF)
RAF Kingsnorth		England	Kent	1914	1919	WWI formerly RNAS Kingsnorth, Isle of Grain, 51° 22' 25" N 0° 36' 07" E, Airship station on the Isle of Grain. Not to be confused with RAF Isle of Grain 51° 26' 21" N 0° 42' 46" E
RAF Kingsnorth	KN	England	Kent	1943	1943	(WWII ALG) near Ashford
RAF Kingstown; RAF Carlisle		England	Cumbria	1938	1996	Sites sold for civilian use including residential development and Kingmoor Business Park.
RAF Kinloss	KW	Scotland	Morayshire	1939	2012	Transferred to the British Army and became Kinloss Barracks. Maintained as a Relief Landing Ground (RLG) for RAF Lossiemouth.
RAF Kinnell		Scotland	Angus	1942	1948	
RAF Kirkbride		England	Cumbria	1939	1960	
RAF Kirkham		England	Lancashire	1940	1957	Part of the site is now HM Prison Kirkham
RAF Kirkistown		Northern Ireland	County Down	1941	1946	On loan to Royal Navy 1945–46 as "HMS Corncrake II"
RAF Kirknewton		Scotland	Midlothian	1941		Since 1967 the airfield has been used by No. 661 Volunteer Gliding School
RAF Kirkpatrick		Scotland	Dumfriesshire	1940	1945	Relief Landing Ground for RAF Kingstown
RAF Kirkton		Scotland	Sutherland	1941	1945	No. 41 Satellite Landing Ground.
RAF Kirmington	KG	England	Lincolnshire	1942	1953	Now Humberside Airport
RAF Kirton in Lindsey	KL	England	Lincolnshire	1940	1966 2013	
RAF Knettishall	KN	England	Suffolk	1943	1959	(USAAF)
RAF Langar	LA	England	Nottinghamshire			
RAF Langford Lodge		Northern Ireland	County Antrim	1942	1953	Intended as no. 20 Satellite Landing Ground but completed as a full airfield.
RAF Langham		England	Norfolk	1940	1961	
RAF Larkhill		England	Wiltshire	1918	1942	Also known as RAF Knighton Down
RAF Lasham		England	Hampshire	1942	1948	now Lasham Airfield
RAF Lashenden		England	Kent	1943	1945	(ALG), now Lashenden (Headcorn) Airfield
RAF Lavenham	LV	England	Suffolk	1943	1948	(USAAF)
RAF Leadenham		England	Lincolnshire			
RAF Leanach		Scotland	Inverness-shire	1941	1945	No. 43 Satellite Landing Ground
RAF Leconfield	LC	England	East Riding of Yorkshire	1936	1977	Transferred to British Army and became the Army School of Mechanical Transport, subsequently the Defence School of Transport.
RAF Lee-on-Solent		England	Hampshire	1917	1939	Transferred to Navy as RNAS Lee-on-Solent (HMS Daedalus) in 1939
RAF Leicester East		England	Leicestershire			Now Leicester Airport
RAF Leiston		England	Suffolk	1943	1953	(USAAF)
RAF Lennoxlove		Scotland	East Lothian	1941	1945	No. 27 Satellite Landing Ground.
RAF Leuchars		Scotland	Fife	1920	2015	Transferred to the British Army and became Leuchars Station. Maintained as a Relief Landing Ground (RLG) for RAF Lossiemouth.
RAF Lichfield	LF	England	Staffordshire	1940	1958	
RAF Limavady		Northern Ireland	County Londonderry	1940	1945	
RAF Lindholme	LB	England	Yorkshire	1940	1985	(previously called RAF Hatfield Woodhouse), now HM Prison Lindholme
RAF Linton-on-Ouse	LO	England	Yorkshire	1936	2020	Station closed with no alternative military use proposed. Site expected to be disposed of by the Ministry of Defence.
RAF Lissett	LT	England	Yorkshire	1943	1945	
RAF Little Horwood	LH	England	Buckinghamshire			
RAF Little Rissington	LR	England	Gloucestershire	1938	1994	Still in use by 637 VGS and 621 VGS (Volunteer Gliding Squadron)
RAF Little Snoring	LS	England	Norfolk	1943	1958	
RAF Little Staughton	LX	England	Cambridgeshire	1942	1945	
RAF Little Walden	LL	England	Essex	1944	1945	(USAAF)
RAF Llanbedr		Wales	Gwynedd			
RAF Llandaff		Wales	Cardiff	1946	1980	Formerly RAF Caerau
RAF Llandow		Wales	South Glamorgan	1940	1957	now Llandow Circuit
RAF Llandwrog		Wales	Gwynedd			
RAF Locking		England	Somerset	1937	1998	Site sold and station buildings demolished, redeveloped for commercial and residential use.
RAF Long Kesh		Northern Ireland	County Antrim	1941	1948	subsequently HM Prison Maze, now closed
RAF Long Marston	JS	England	Warwickshire			
RAF Longbenton		England	Northumberland			vehicle storage unit
RAF Longman		Scotland	Inverness-shire	1940	1946	Also known as RAF Inverness. Opened as Inverness Airport in 1933, but replaced by present Inverness Airport (former RAF Dalcross) in 1947.
RAF Longley Lane		England	Lancashire			
RAF Loughborough		England	Leicestershire			
RAF Low Eldrig		Scotland	Wigtownshire	1941	1944	No. 11 Satellite Landing Ground. Only used during summer months of 1941 and 1942.
RAF Ludford Magna	LM	England	Lincolnshire	1943	1963	
RAF Ludham		England	Norfolk	1941	1946	Also RNAS Ludham/HMS Flycatcher, now unlicensed private landing strip.
RAF Lulsgate Bottom		England	Somerset	1940	1946	Now Bristol Airport
RAF Luton		England	Bedfordshire	1938	1946	Now London Luton Airport
RAF Lydd (WWII)		England	Kent	1943	1944	WWII ALG – not the current Lydd Airport
RAF Lymington	LY	England	Hampshire	1942	1944	ALG
RAF Lympne		England	Kent	1916	1946	Also served as Lympne Airport between the wars and post WWII, and as HMS Buzzard / HMS Daedalus II 1938–40
RAF Lyneham		England	Wiltshire	1940	2012	Transferred to British Army and became MOD Lyneham, home to the new Defence School of Electronic and Mechanical Engineering, part of the Defence College of Technical Training (DCTT) .
RAF Lytham		England	Lancashire	1947	1956	Originally part of RAF Warton, but when the main airfield site was sold to the English Electric Company in 1947, one of the outlying sites was designated as RAF Lytham, and was used as a Transit Camp and for Medical Training. This site closed in 1956, with the Medical Training Unit moving to another nearby site with the designated name of RAF Freckleton.
RAF Machrihanish		Scotland	Argyllshire	1918	1996	Briefly used as an airfield during 1918. Reopened by Royal Navy in 1941 as HMS Landrail. Transferred to RAF in 1963. Since 1996, part of the site has been leased to Highlands and Islands Airports Ltd. and is known as Campbeltown Airport. The remainder of the site was retained by the MOD until 2012 when it was sold to the Machrihanish Airbase Community Company under community right-to-buy legislation.
RAF Macmerry		Scotland	East Lothian	1941	1946	Also (unofficially) known as RAF Tranent and RAF Penston, and briefly transferred to Royal Navy as HMS Nighthawk II during 1945. Operated as civil airfield 1929–53.
RAF Madley		England	Herefordshire	1941	1946	Now a BT Group earth station – Madley Communications Centre
RAF Maghaberry		Northern Ireland	County Antrim	1941	1946	Now HM Prison Maghaberry
RAF Manby		England	Lincolnshire	1938	1974	
RAF Manorbier		Wales	Pembrokeshire	1933	1946	
RAF Manston		England	Kent	1917	1999	Became Kent International Airport (closed 2014) and Defence Fire Training and Development Centre (closed 2020). Now MOD Manston, base for PWRR 3rd Battalion A Company.
RAF Manywells Height		England	Yorkshire	1916	1919	No trace remains, returned to farmland
RAF Marden		England	Kent	1917	1919	Class 2 Airfield, near Staplehurst, housed a RAF wireless transmitter station during WW2
RAF Market Deeping		England	Lincolnshire			
RAF Market Drayton		England	Shropshire			(Buntingsdale Hall)
RAF Market Harborough	MB	England	Leicestershire	1943	1947	
RAF Market Stainton		England	Lincolnshire			
RAF Marston Moor	MA	England	Yorkshire	1941	1945	originally named RAF Tockwith and sometimes incorrectly RAF Marsden Moor
RAF Martlesham Heath	MH	England	Suffolk	1917	1963	Pre 1939 was home to Royal Aircraft Establishment, in 1939 RAE moved to Farnborough and airfield became a Fighter Station as part of 11 Group. In 1943 RAF Moved out and USAAF moved in. Post war the airfield had numerous roles until 1959 when it became home to Headquarters 11 Group Fighter Command, and that same year the Original Battle of Britain Flight as it was then known moved from North Weald where it had been formed to Martlesham Heath. In 1961 however it was decided that the close proximity of Martlesham's circuit to the fast Jets of the bases of nearby Woodbridge and Bentwaters was becoming a problem and Martlesham was declared surplus to requirements and the Royal Air Force moved out. Now mostly redeveloped into housing, retail park and light industrial development but an aviation museum is located in the former control tower.
RAF Marwell Hall		England	Hampshire	1941	1945	Now the site of Marwell Zoo
RAF Matching	MT	England	Essex	1943	1945	
RAF Matlaske		England	Norfolk			
RAF Mattishall		England	Norfolk			First World War landing ground
RAF Maydown		Northern Ireland	County Londonderry	1942	1945	Transferred to Royal Navy as HMS Gannet II.
RAF Medmenham		England	Buckinghamshire	1941	1977	
RAF Meikle Ferry		Scotland	Ross and Cromarty	1942	1946	Marine Craft Unit
RAF Meir		England	Staffordshire			
RAF Melbourne	ME	England	Yorkshire	1940	1945	
RAF Melksham		England	Wiltshire	1940	1965	Training schools
RAF Melton Mowbray		England	Leicestershire	1943	1964	Now military dog training site
RAF Membury	ME	England	Berkshire	1942	1947	(USAAF)
RAF Mendlesham	MD	England	Suffolk	1944	1954	(USAAF)
RAF Mepal	MP	England	Cambridgeshire	1943	1963	now Mepal Airfield
RAF Merston		England	Sussex	1941	1944	USAAF 1942–43 (Satellite of RAF Tangmere). Used by French RAF pilots during D-Day
RAF Merryfield	HI, MF	England	Somerset	1944	1946	USAAF 1944–45, now RNAS Merryfield HMS Heron II from 1971. Formerly known as RAF Isle Abbots.
RAF Metfield		England	Suffolk	1943	1945	(USAAF)
RAF Metheringham	MN	England	Lincolnshire	1943	1946	
RAF Methven		Scotland	Perthshire	1941	c.1945	No. 24 Satellite Landing Ground.
RAF Methwold	ML	England	Norfolk	1939	1958	
RAF Middle Wallop		England	Hampshire	1940	1958	now used by the British Army, AAC Middle Wallop
RAF Middleton St. George	MG	England	County Durham	1941	1965	Formerly RAF Goosepool, now Teesside International Airport
RAF Milfield		England	Northumberland	1942	1946	Previously used as landing ground known as Woodbridge during 1917.
RAF Mill Green		England	Hertfordshire	1943	1948	RAF Airfield Construction Branch plant store and training base
RAF Millom		England	Cumbria	1941	1945	Now HM Prison Haverigg
RAF Milltown		Scotland	Morayshire	1943	2001	Closed for flying in 1977, retained by the RAF as a high frequency signals transmitter station until transfer to the Defence Communication Services Agency in 2001. HF station later closed and site was sold in 2013.
RAF Minchinhampton		England	Gloucestershire	1918	1919	
RAF Misson		England	Nottinghamshire			Cold War Bloodhound missile site as defence for (then) RAF Finningley to the west
RAF Montford Bridge		England	Shropshire	1941	1945	Satellite station of RAF Rednal
RAF Montrose		Scotland	Angus	1912	1952	First military airfield in Scotland.
RAF Morecambe		England	Lancashire			The Midland Hotel requisitioned as an RAF Hospital
RAF Moreton-in-Marsh	MO	England	Gloucestershire	1941	1955	Now the site of the Fire Service College
RAF Moreton Valence		England	Gloucestershire	1939	1962	The runway is now buried under the M5 motorway. The station was adjacent to 7MU Quedgeley.
RAF Morpeth		England	Northumberland	1942	1948	Also known locally as Tranwell.
RAF Mount Batten		England	Devon	1918	1986	formerly RAF Cattewater
RAF Mount Farm	MF	England	Oxfordshire	1940	1946	(USAAF)
RAF Mousehold Heath		England	Norfolk			1914 under RFC, became first Norwich Airport in 1933. Now the Heartsease estate.
RAF Mullaghmore		Northern Ireland	County Londonderry	1942	1945	
RAF Murlough		Northern Ireland	County Down	1941	1945	No. 19 Satellite Landing Ground.
RAF Narborough		England	Norfolk	1915	1919	Sited to the NE of present-day RAF Marham
RAF Needs Oar Point		England	Hampshire	1943	1944	ALG
RAF Nether Wallop		England	Hampshire	1945	1946	HQ Southern Sector
RAF Netheravon		England	Wiltshire	1919	1957	Netheravon Camp (Army Air Corps) 1963–2012
RAF Newchurch		England	Kent	1943	1944	ALG
RAF Newhaven		England	Sussex	1917	1919	Newhaven Seaplane Base
RAF Newmarket	NM	England	Suffolk	1939	1945	
RAF New Romney		England	Kent	1917	1919	(WWI) Became Littlestone Airfield post-war, used as an Emergency Landing Ground
RAF New Romney		England	Kent	1942	1944	(WWII) Also known as RAF Honeychild
RAF Newton	NA	England	Nottinghamshire	1937	2000	Reduced to an enclave in 1995, site later closed and sold for residential-led mixed use development. Former aircraft hangars retrained for commercial use.
RAF Newtownards		Northern Ireland	County Down	1939	1945	Opened as Ards Airport in 1934, now Newtownards Airport.
RAF Hospital Nocton Hall		England	Lincolnshire	1947	1995	Sold and converted to residential care home, later became derelict.
RAF North Coates		England	Lincolnshire	1935	1990	
RAF North Creake	NO	England	Norfolk	1943	1945	
RAF North Killingholme	NK	England	Lincolnshire	1943	1945	
RAF North Luffenham	NL	England	Rutland	1940	1997	Transferred to the British Army and became St George's Barracks.
RAF North Pickenham	NP	England	Norfolk	1944	1965	Now a turkey farm and karting circuit
RAF North Weald		England	Essex	1916	1964	This is where the VE-Day celebration flypast took off from, with Group Captain Douglas Bader taking the role of 'Lead Fighter'. Now North Weald Airfield.
RAF North Witham	NW	England	Lincolnshire			
RAF Hospital Northallerton		England	Yorkshire	1943	1947	Served as the RAF hospital for No. 6 Group (RCAF)
RAF Northleach		England	Gloucestershire	1942	1944	
RAF Norton		England	Yorkshire	1939	1965	
RAF Norton Disney		England	Lincolnshire			Originally named RAF Swinderby (but on different site to later flying station), large-capacity bomb storage area
RAF Nuneaton	NU	England	Leicestershire			also known as RAF Lindley
RAF Nuneham Park		England	Oxfordshire			
RAF Nuthampstead	NT	England	Hertfordshire	1943	1954	(USAAF)
RAF Nutts Corner		Northern Ireland	County Antrim	1941	1946	Subsequently, Belfast Airport until 1963.
RAF Oakham		England	Leicestershire			
RAF Oakhanger		England	Hampshire	1966	2003	Satellite communications station now operated by Airbus Defence and Space under a private finance initiative contract for the Ministry of Defence.
RAF Oakington	OA	England	Cambridgeshire	1940	1970	Being developed into Northstowe new town. Runway, taxiways and most buildings have been demolished.
RAF Oakley	OY	England	Buckinghamshire	1942	1945	
RAF Oatlands Hill		England	Wiltshire	1941	1945	RLG and overspill site for Old Sarum
RAF Oban		Scotland	Argyllshire	1939	1945	Flying boat station at Ganavan Bay. Not to be confused with the present Oban Airport (ex RAF Connel).
RAF Okehampton		England	Devon			Also known as Folly Gate
RAF Old Buckenham	OE	England	Norfolk	1943	1945	(USAAF)
RAF Old Sarum		England	Wiltshire	1917	1971	now Old Sarum Airfield
RAF Ossington	ON	England	Nottinghamshire	1942	1946	
RAF Oulton	OU	England	Norfolk	1940	1947	
RAF Ouston		England	Northumberland	1941	1974	Now Albemarle Barracks (British Army) near Heddon on the Wall.
RAF Padgate		England	Lancashire			
RAF Pembrey		Wales	Carmarthenshire	1940	1957	Now Pembrey Race Track
RAF Pembroke Dock		Wales	Pembrokeshire	1930	1957	
RAF Pengam Moors		Wales	South Glamorgan	1937	1953	(aka RAF Cardiff)
RAF Penshurst		England	Kent	1916	1919 1946	Became Penshurst Airfield, in operation 1919–36, reopened during WWII
RAF Penrhos		Wales	Caernarvonshire	1937	1947	Established as the Polish Resettlement Centre post-WW2
RAF Peplow	CE	England	Shropshire	1940	1947	Also known for a short period as RAF Childs Ercall. Later renamed HMS Godwit as a Fleet Air Arm instrument landing school
RAF Perranporth		England	Cornwall	1941	1945	
RAF Pershore	PR	England	Worcestershire	1941	1978	also known as RAF Throckmorton, became Royal Radar Establishment RRE Pershore
RAF Perth		Scotland	Perthshire	1936	1954	Now Perth (Scone) Airport
RAF Perton		England	Staffordshire	1941	1945	
RAF Peterhead		Scotland	Aberdeenshire	1941	1945	
RAF Peterborough		England	Northamptonshire	1932	1964	
RAF Pevensey		England	Sussex			
RAF Pitreavie Castle		Scotland	Fife	1938	1996	Main building converted to residential use, others demolished.
RAF Pocklington	OC	England	Yorkshire	1941	1946	
RAF Podington		England	Bedfordshire	1942	1946	Now Santa Pod Raceway drag strip
RAF Polebrook	PK	England	Northamptonshire	1941	1963	(USAAF)
RAF Polegate		England	Sussex	1915	1919	Airship base
RAF Port Ellen		Scotland	Argyllshire	1940	1947	Also known as RAF Glenegedale and RAF Islay, now Islay Airport
RAF Portreath		England	Cornwall			After the War part of the airfield became Chemical Defence Establishment Nancekuke (CDE Nancekuke, a Chemical weapons manufacturing facility for VX gas and Sarin gas, (closed in the 1950s). Now RRH Portreath, a remote Radar Head
RAF Portsmouth		England	Hampshire	1939	1949	
RAF Poulton		England	Cheshire	1943	1945	Used as a satellite of RAF Hawarden.
RAF Prawle Point		England	Devon	1917	1919	Formerly RNAS Prawle Point
RAF Prestatyn		Wales	Denbighshire			
RAF Prestwick		Scotland	Ayrshire	1936	2013	Operations transferred to RAF (U) Swanwick.
RAF Pucklechurch		England	Gloucestershire	1939	1959	Now HM Prison Ashfield
RAF Pulborough		England	Sussex	1940	1945	Emergency Landing Ground
RAF Pulham		England	Norfolk	1918	1958	used for the development of British airships between the wars
RAF Quedgeley		England	Gloucestershire	1939	1995	Site sold and redeveloped as Kingsway Village.
RAF Rackheath	RK	England	Norfolk	1943	1945	(USAAF) Now Rackheath Industrial Estate.
RAF Radlett		England	Hertfordshire	1940	1945	Aldenham Lodge Hotel requisitioned as the headquarters of No. 80 (Signals) Wing, not the Handley Page Airfield
RAF Ramsbury	RY	England	Wiltshire	1942	1945	(USAAF)
RAF Ramsgate		England	Kent	1940	1940	Also Ramsgate Airport, temporary requisition during the Battle of Britain as dispersals for RAF Manston, re-opened as civil airfield in 1953 and closed in 1968
RAF Ratcliffe		England	Leicestershire			ATA use of Ratcliffe Aerodrome
RAF Rattlesden	RS	England	Suffolk	1942	1945	(USAAF)
RAF Rauceby		England	Lincolnshire			No 4 RAF Hospital between 1940 and 1947 – became Rauceby Mental Hospital
RAF Raydon	RA	England	Suffolk	1942	1958	(USAAF)
RAF Reading		England	Berkshire			
RAF Rearsby		England	Leicestershire			A former flying club airfield was the base for Taylorcraft Aeroplanes (England) Ltd changed its name to The Auster Aircraft Company Ltd. Subsequently used as a component manufacturer for the automotive industry.
RAF Redhill		England	Surrey	1937	1954	now Redhill Aerodrome
RAF Rednal		England	Shropshire	1942–1945	1945	now Rednal Airfield
RAF Regents Park		England	City of Westminster			No. 1 Aircrew Reception Centre
RAF Renfrew		Scotland	Renfrewshire	1925		Opened 1915 as manufacturer's airfield, subsequently a civil airfield (Renfrew Airport) until closure in 1966. RAuxAF 602 Squadron formed 1925. RAF use ceased after WW2.
RAF Rhoose		Wales	South Glamorgan	1942	1952	Now Cardiff Airport
RAF Riccall	RC	England	Yorkshire	1942	1946	
RAF Ridgewell	RD	England	Essex	1942	1957	(USAAF)
RAF Ringway		England	Cheshire			Formerly and now Manchester Airport
RAF Ripon		England	North Yorkshire	1916	1919	After 1919, reverted to Ripon Racecourse, but was used sporadically throughout the 1920s for civilian flights
RAF Rivenhall	RL	England	Essex	1943	1945	
RAF Roborough		England	Devon	1938	1945	Formerly Plymouth Municipal Aerodrome, now Plymouth City Airport, closed 2020
RAF Rochester		England	Kent	1938	1953	1938 location of No. 23 Elementary and Reserve Flying Training School.
RAF Rochford; RAF Southend		England	Essex	May 1915	1945	Now London Southend Airport
RAF Ronaldsway		Isle of Man			1943	(HMS Urley, RNAS Ronaldsway), now main Isle of Man airport
RAF Rudloe Manor		England	Wiltshire	1940	2000	Formerly RAF Box, also known as RAF Corsham, now MoD Corsham
RAF Rufforth	RU	England	Yorkshire	1942	1954	
RAF Rustington		England	Sussex	1917	1919	
RAF Saltby	SY	England	Leicestershire			
RAF Samlesbury		England	Lancashire			now Samlesbury Aerodrome
RAF Sandtoft		England	Lincolnshire	1943	1955	
RAF Sandy Bay		Northern Ireland	County Antrim			flying boat base on Lough Neagh near Ram's Island
RAF Sawbridgeworth	ZH (day use only)	England	Hertfordshire	1916	1946	Originally established in WW1 as a Night Landing Ground for 39 (Home Defence) Sqn of the RFC it was operational from April 1916 to November 1918. The location was reused in an enlarged state as an airfield in October 1940 and operational until mid-1946, whence it returned to agriculture.
RAF Scampton		England	Lincolnshire	1916	2023	Station closed with no alternative military use proposed. Site expected to be disposed of by the Ministry of Defence.
RAF Scarnish		Scotland	Argyllshire			Ground Control Intercept radar station
RAF Scatsta		Scotland	Shetland	1940	1946	Now Scatsta Airport
RAF Scorton		England	Yorkshire	1939	1945	
RAF Sculthorpe	SP	England	Norfolk	1943	1992	Airfield retained in military use by the MOD and known as the Sculthorpe Training Area. Technical and administrative buildings sold for civilian use and now form Tattersett Business Park. Former military housing refurbished to create Wicken Green Village.
RAF Sealand		Wales	Flintshire	1916	2006	Transferred to the Defence Aviation Repair Agency (DARA), now Defence Electronics and Components Agency (DECA). Part of site sold for redevelopment.
RAF Sedgeford		England	Norfolk			WW1 night landing ground, site used as airfield decoy during WW2
RAF Seething		England	Norfolk	1943	1945	
RAF Seighford	YD	England	Staffordshire			
RAF Selsey		England	Sussex	1943	1945	ALG, previously Selsey Airfield
RAF Sharnbrook		England	Bedfordshire			Munitions Storage Depot
RAF Sheerness (Aerodrome)		England	Kent	1918	1918	Emergency Landing Ground
RAF Sheerness		England	Kent	1919	1919	Balloon station
RAF Shellbeach		England	Kent	1918	1981	WWI Emergency Landing Ground
RAF Shellingford		England	Oxfordshire			
RAF Shepherds Grove		England	Suffolk			
RAF Sherburn-in-Elmet		England	Yorkshire	1917	1945	Now Sherburn-in-Elmet Airfield
RAF Shipdham	SJ	England	Norfolk	1942	1945	(USAAF)
RAF Shobdon		England	Herefordshire	1940	1946	Now Shobdon Aerodrome
RAF Shoreham (WWI)		England	Sussex	1914	1921	
RAF Shoreham (WWII)		England	Sussex	1940	1946	Wartime requisition of Shoreham Airport
RAF Shrewton		England	Wiltshire	1940	1946	Relief landing ground
RAF Sidmouth		England	Devon	1943	1945	Various hotels requisitioned as The Air Crew Officers School, a convalescent home and a Medical Training Establishment and Depot
RAF Silloth		England	Cumbria	1939	1960	
RAF Silverstone	SV	England	Northamptonshire	1943	1947	Straddles Buckinghamshire border. Now Silverstone International Motor Racing Circuit.
RAF Skaebrae		Scotland	Orkney	1940	1957	
RAF Skellingthorpe	FG	England	Lincolnshire	1941–1952	1952	
RAF Skipton-on-Swale	SK	England	Yorkshire	1942	1945	
RAF Skitten		Scotland	Caithness	1940	1945	
RAF Sleap		England	Shropshire	1943	1964	now Sleap Airfield
RAF Snailwell		England	Cambridgeshire	1941	1946	
RAF Snaith	SX	England	Yorkshire	1941	1946	
RAF Snetterton Heath	SN	England	Norfolk	1943	1948	airfield now Snetterton Motor Racing Circuit and Snetterton outdoor market
RAF Snettisham		England	Norfolk			USAAF Gunnery School/Range
RAF Snitterfield		England	Warwickshire	1943	1946	
RAF Soberton		England	Hampshire	1940		Emergency Landing Ground
RAF Somerton		England	Isle of Wight	1916	1919	Became civil airfield for Saunders-Roe post-war, closed 1951
RAF South Cerney		England	Gloucestershire	1937	1971	Transferred to British Army and became Duke of Gloucester Barracks.
RAF South Witham		England	Lincolnshire			
RAF Southam		England	Warwickshire	1940	1944	
RAF Southrop		England	Gloucestershire	1940	1947	
RAF Spanhoe	UV	England	Northamptonshire	1944	1946	Also known as Wakerley or Harringworth
RAF Speke		England	Lancashire			Now hotel complex with aircraft museum, airfield rebuilt on site to south-east and now called Liverpool John Lennon Airport
RAF Spilsby	SL	England	Lincolnshire			
RAF Spitalgate		England	Lincolnshire	1916	1975	(sometimes incorrectly spelled RAF Spittlegate) (formerly RAF Grantham), now Prince William of Gloucester Barracks
RAF Squires Gate		England	Lancashire			Now Blackpool Airport
RAF St Angelo		Northern Ireland	County Fermanagh	1941	1947	Originally no. 18 Satellite Landing Ground, but subsequently a full aerodrome. Now Enniskillen/St Angelo Airport.
RAF St Athan		Wales	Vale of Glamorgan	1938	2006	Renamed MOD St Athan, home to the RAF's No. 4 School of Technical Training, units flying the Grob Tutor and the Special Forces Support Group.
RAF St Davids		Wales	Pembrokeshire	1943	1958	
RAF St Eval		England	Cornwall	1939	1959	
RAF Stafford		England	Staffordshire	1938	2006	Was No. 16 Maintenance Unit RAF (16 MU). Transferred to British Army and became MOD Stafford (Beacon Barracks).
RAF Stanbridge		England	Bedfordshire	1939	2013	Also known as RAF Leighton Buzzard. Site sold for redevelopment, station buildings demolished.
RAF Stanley Park		England	Lancashire			Now Blackpool Zoo
RAF Stanmore Park		England	Middlesex			Totally demolished and redeveloped into a civilian housing estate
RAF Stannington		England	Northumberland			
RAF Stansted Mountfitchet	KT	England	Essex	1943	1958	Now London Stansted Airport
RAF Stanton Harcourt	ST	England	Oxfordshire			
RAF Stapleford Tawney		England	Essex	1939	1945	now Stapleford Aerodrome
RAF Staplehurst	SH	England	Kent	1943	1944	Prototype ALG/USAAF
RAF Staverton		England	Gloucestershire	1936	1951	
RAF Steeple Morden	KR	England	Cambridgeshire	1940	1946	
RAF Stoke Hammond		England	Buckinghamshire		1974	
RAF Stoke Orchard		England	Gloucestershire	1941	1945	
RAF Stoney Cross		England	Hampshire	1942	1948	
RAF Stormy Down		Wales	Glamorganshire	1940	1945	
RAF Stornoway		Scotland	Ross and Cromarty	1941	1998	Opened as civil airport in 1934. Returned to civilian use and became Stornoway Airport.
Stow Maries Aerodrome		England	Essex	1917	1940	Originally opened as an RFC station in 1914 (all titles changed to 'RAF' after 1 April 1918), not used in WW2, now a Heritage Centre and private airfield
RAF Stracathro		Scotland	Angus	1941	1948	
RAF Stradishall	NX	England	Suffolk	1938	1970	now HMP Highpoint prison.
RAF Stratford	NF	England	Warwickshire	1942	1945	Formerly RAF Atherstone
RAF Stravithie		Scotland	Fife	1941	1945	No. 26 Satellite Landing Ground
RAF Strubby	NY	England	Lincolnshire	1943	1972	
RAF Sturgate		England	Lincolnshire	1944	1964	now Sturgate Airfield
RAF Sudbury	SU	England	Suffolk	1944	1945	
RAF Sullom Voe		Scotland	Shetland	1939	1952	Flying boat station. Now subsumed by the Sullom Voe oil terminal.
RAF Sumburgh		Scotland	Shetland	1940	1946	Opened as civil airport in 1936, now Sumburgh Airport
RAF Sutton Bridge		England	Lincolnshire	1926	1958	Formerly an Armament Practice Camp established 1 September 1926, from 1932 renamed RAF Sutton Bridge, closed 1958, airfield landsite transferred to the Ministry of Agriculture and continues to be used by the Potato Council as an agricultural experiment station.
RAF Sutton on Hull		England	Yorkshire	1938	1961	
RAF Swannington	NG	England	Norfolk	1944	1947	
RAF Swanton Morley	SM	England	Norfolk	1940	1995	Transferred to the British Army and became Robertson Barracks.
RAF Swinderby	SN	England	Lincolnshire	1940	1993	Sold in 1995, the technical site is now an industrial estate and domestic site became the village of Witham St Hughs. The airfield remains and is disused.
RAF Swingfield		England	Kent	1916–1919	1940–1946	WW1 ELG, reopened as WWII ALG
RAF Sydenham		Northern Ireland	County Down	1939	1978	Opened as civil airfield in 1933. Also known at various times as RAF Belfast, HMS Gadwall, HMS Gannet III, Belfast Harbour Airport, Belfast City Airport, now George Best Belfast City Airport
RAF Sywell		England	Northamptonshire			Now Sywell Aerodrome
RAF Tadcaster		England	North Yorkshire	late 1915	April 1920	
RAF Tain		Scotland	Ross and Cromarty	1941	1946	Disused airfield within boundaries of the current bombing range.
RAF Talbenny		Wales	Pembrokeshire	1942	1946	
RAF Tangmere		England	Sussex	1917	1979	Now Tangmere Aviation Museum
RAF Tarrant Rushton		England	Dorsetshire	1943	1947	Site returned to agricultural use
RAF Tatenhill	VL	England	Staffordshire	1941	1947	(initially called RAF Crossplains) – see also Tatenhill Airfield
RAF Tealing		Scotland	Angus	1942	1945	
RAF Teddington		England	Greater London	1942	1963	See Camp Griffiss
RAF Telscombe Cliffs		England	Sussex	1916	1919	
RAF Templeton		Wales	Pembrokeshire	1942	1945	
RAF Tempsford		England	Bedfordshire	1941	1947	
RAF Ternhill		England	Shropshire	1916	1976	Technical and administrative site transferred to the British Army and became Borneo Barracks, later renamed Clive Barracks. Airfield retained by the RAF for use as a relief landing ground, now used by the Defence Helicopter Flying School.
RAF Thatcham		England	Berkshire		2001	Now automotive industry research, test and development facility
RAF Thame		England	Buckinghamshire			Now Haddenham Airfield
RAF Theale		England	Berkshire			Now gravel pits
RAF Theddlethorpe		England	Lincolnshire			(former bombing range)
RAF Thetford		England	Norfolk			
RAF Tholthorpe	TH	England	Yorkshire	1940	1948	
RAF Thornaby	TB	England	Yorkshire	1929	1958	now extended Thornaby town housing
RAF Thorney Island		England	Sussex	1938	1976	Transferred to the British Army in 1984 and became Baker Barracks.
RAF Thorpe Abbotts	TA	England	Norfolk	1943	1956	(USAAF)
RAF Throwley		England	Kent	1916	1919	Allocated as a WWII Emergency Landing Ground, but not used.
RAF Thruxton	TX	England	Hampshire	1942	1946	now Thruxton Motor Racing Circuit
RAF Thurleigh		England	Bedfordshire	1936	1946	Converted to RAE Bedford and is now Bedford Autodrome
RAF Tibenham		England	Norfolk	1942	1959	(USAAF)
RAF Tilshead		England	Wiltshire	1925	1941	
RAF Tilstock	OK	England	Shropshire	1942	1946	
RAF Tipnor		England	Hampshire	1917	1919	Balloon station
RAF Tiree		Scotland	Inverness-shire	1941	1946	Now Tiree Airport, used as civil airport since 1937.
RAF Toome		Northern Ireland	County Antrim	1943	1954	
RAF Hospital Torquay		England	Devon	1939	1942	RAf Officers' Convalescent Hospital
RAF Towyn		Wales	Merionethshire	1940	1945	
RAF Trebelzue		England	Cornwall			pre-WW2 gliding/flying site as 'Big Field'; 2 runways laid end-41, declared unsuitable and used as dispersals by RAF St Mawgan during WWII, later a weapons store for the US Navy and still extant
RAF Treligga		England	Cornwall	1939	1955	Was RN bombing range, now agriculture
RAF Truleigh Hill		England	Sussex			
RAF Tuddenham	TD	England	Suffolk	1943	1963	
RAF Turnberry		Scotland	Ayrshire	1917	1945	Used 1917–18 and as a landing ground in the 1930s. Full aerodrome reopened in 1942, now golf and hotel complex.
RAF Turnhouse		Scotland	Midlothian	1916	1997	Now Edinburgh Airport
RAF Turweston	TU	England	Buckinghamshire	1942	1945	Now Turweston Aerodrome
RAF Twinwood Farm		England	Bedfordshire	1941	1945	(USAAF from 1944)
RAF Tydd St Mary		England	Lincolnshire			(former RFC Aerodrome Tydd St Mary – transferred to RAF in 1918)
RAF Upavon	UA	England	Wiltshire	1912	1993	Transferred to the British Army and became Upavon Station, Trenchard Lines.
RAF Upottery		England	Devon	1944	1948	Although the runways remain the land and remaining buildings are in private ownership.
RAF Upper Heyford	UH	England	Oxfordshire	1918	1994	Site sold, several buildings now in various civilian uses and other areas redeveloped for housing. Several areas and buildings given scheduled or listed status.
RAF Upwood	UD	England	Cambridgeshire	1917	2012	Sold for various civilian uses.
RAF Usworth		England	County Durham	1916	1958	Sunderland Airport from 1963, redeveloped as Nissan car plant from 1984
RAF Uxbridge		England	London	1918	2010	Closed as a result of the MOD's Project MoDEL, site sold for redevelopment and majority of station buildings demolished. Operations room now Battle of Britain Bunker museum.
RAF Wainfleet		England	Lincolnshire			Bombing range.
RAF Walmer		England	Kent	1918	1919	
RAF Walney Island		England	Lancashire			Barrow/Walney Island Airport
RAF Wanborough		England	Wiltshire	1941	1945	Relief Landing Ground
RAF Warboys	WB	England	Cambridgeshire	1941	1963	
RAF Warmwell	XW	England	Dorsetshire	1937	1945	Airfield site now quarried, technical site now Crossways village
RAF Warton		England	Lancashire			Originally Warton Aerodrome but, following the extension of two runways in 1940, the site became a satellite station of the RAF Coastal Command located at RAF Squires Gate. During WW2 the airfield was used by the USAAF as BAD2. Following the war the airfield was designated as RAF Warton. In 1947 the main airfield site was purchased and developed by the English Electric Company. Two outlying parts of the Warton site became RAF Lytham and RAF Freckleton. The main site has evolved over many years and is currently known as BAE Systems Warton.
RAF Warwick		England	Warwickshire	1941	1945	Relief Landing Ground
RAF Watchet		England	Somerset	1937	1940	RAF offshore firing range, Queen Bee launch site
RAF Watchfield		England	Oxfordshire	1940	1950	
RAF Waterbeach	WJ	England	Cambridgeshire	1941	1963	From 1966 to 2013 called Waterbeach Barracks – British Army, Royal Engineers. Closed in March 2013.
RAF Wath Head		England	Cumberland	1941	1945	
RAF Watnall		England	Nottinghamshire			
RAF Wattisham	WT	England	Suffolk	1939	1993	Transferred to the British Army's Army Air Corps and became Wattisham Flying Station.
RAF Watton	WN	England	Norfolk	1939	1976	All but the airfield demolished to create new housing estate. Site used by the Army, whose Stanford Training Area is nearby. The southern taxiway has been removed, and much of the remaining site is in agricultural use.
RAF Weeton		England	Lancashire	1940	1970	Now Weeton Barracks
RAF Hospital Weeton		England	Lancashire			
RAF Warrington		England	Lancashire			
RAF Wellesbourne Mountford	WM	England	Warwickshire	1941	1963	Wellesbourne Mountford Airfield since 1965.
RAF Wellingore		England	Lincolnshire	1937	1946	
RAF Wendling		England	Norfolk	1943	1945	USAAF
RAF West Ayton		England	Yorkshire	1918	1919	
RAF West Drayton		England	Middlesex	1924	1944	
RAF West Freugh		Scotland	Wigtownshire	1937	2001	Became RAE West Freugh when taken over by the Royal Aircraft Establishment in 1956, now MoD West Freugh with bombing and weapon test Ranges, also training area for maritime/landing operations.
RAF West Kirby		England	Merseyside	1940	1957	training camp on the Wirral Peninsula
RAF West Malling	VG	England	Kent	1917	1969	Became Maidstone Airport in 1930
RAF West Raynham	WR	England	Norfolk	1939	1994	
RAF Westcott	WX	England	Buckinghamshire	1942	1945	Became the Rocket Propulsion Establishment (RPE Westcott)
RAF Westenhanger		England	Kent	1944		Folkestone Racecourse
RAF Westgate		England	Kent	1918	1920	
RAF Westhampnett	WQ	England	Sussex	1940	1946	Satellite of RAF Tangmere, Emergency Landing Ground, now Chichester/Goodwood Airfield
RAF Weston-on-the-Green		England	Oxfordshire			
RAF Weston-super-Mare		England	Somerset	1939	1955	Opened as civilian airport, now mostly housing, also a heliport and (since 1978) The Helicopter Museum
RAF Weston Zoyland		England	Somerset	1926	1969	
RAF West Ruislip		England	Middlesex	1917	1955	Later USAF/USN, closed 2006
RAF Wethersfield		England	Essex	1941	1970	USAAF from 1944. Now MDP Wethersfield – MoD Police training base
RAF Weybourne		England	Norfolk	1939	1942	Now the location of the Muckelboro Collection
RAF Wheaton Aston	WH	England	Staffordshire	1941	1947	Post war was used as a camp for Polish immigrants. Now used for pig farming.
RAF Whitchurch		England	Somerset			See Bristol (Whitchurch) Airport
RAF White Waltham		England	Berkshire	1938	1982	Now White Waltham Airfield
RAF Whitefield		Scotland	Perthshire	1939	1945	Relief Landing Ground for RAF Perth.
RAF Whitley Bay		England	Northumberland			
RAF Wick		Scotland	Caithness	1939	1946	Now Wick John O'Groats Airport
RAF Wickenby	UI	England	Lincolnshire	1942	1956	
RAF Wig Bay		Scotland	Wigtownshire	1940	1957	Flying boat base (Sunderlands) on West side of Loch Ryan, also known as RAF Stranraer.
RAF Wigsley	UG	England	Lincolnshire	1942	1958	Site straddled the border between Lincolnshire and Nottinghamshire. Satellite of RAF Swinderby.
RAF Wigtown		Scotland	Wigtownshire	1941	1948	
RAF Willingale	JC	England	Essex	1946	1959	See also RAF Chipping Ongar
RAF Wilmslow		England	Cheshire	1938	1962	The station was demolished shortly after closing in 1962. During the 1980s the eastern part of the camp was developed with housing by local construction company Jones Homes, forming the 'Summerfields' development. During the early 1990s the A34 bypass of Wilmslow was constructed, which cut the site in two. Between 1996 and 2015 the remaining western part of the site was developed for housing, forming 'The Villas' and 'Regents Park' developments.
RAF Wincombe		England	Wiltshire	1943	1977	Originally the site of a RAF Home Defence Unit (HDU), prior to becoming an intercept station. The site is now farmland, housing developments, and a commercial creamery where some original buildings are still in use.
RAF Winfield		Scotland	Berwickshire	1942	1945	
RAF Windrush	UR	England	Gloucestershire			
RAF Wing	UX	England	Buckinghamshire	1942	1958	
RAF Winkton	XT	England	Hampshire	1943	1944	ALG
RAF Winkleigh		England	Devon	1943	1958	
RAF Winterseugh		Scotland	Dumfriesshire	1941	1944	No. 37 Satellite Landing Ground.
RAF Winthorpe	WE	England	Nottinghamshire	1940	1958	Now Newark Air Museum and Newark Showground
RAF Witchford	EL	England	Cambridgeshire	1943	1946	
RAF Wombleton	UN	England	Yorkshire	1943	1949	
RAF Woodbridge	OZ	England	Suffolk	1943	1993	Transferred to the British Army in 2006 and became MOD Woodbridge, incorporating Rock Barracks and Woodbridge Airfield.
RAF Woodchurch	XO	England	Kent	1943		ALG
RAF Woodcote		England	Oxfordshire	1941	1959	
RAF Woodhall Spa	WS	England	Lincolnshire	1942	1964	
RAF Woodhaven		Scotland	Fife	1942	1945	Flying boat annex to RAF Leuchars
RAF Woodley		England	Berkshire			
RAF Woolfox Lodge	WL	England	Rutland	1940	1964	
RAF Woolsington		England	Northumberland	1940	1945	Previously RAF Station Newcastle, now Newcastle International Airport
RAF Worcester		England	Worcestershire			
RAF Worksop	WP	England	Nottinghamshire	1943	1960	
RAF Wormingford		England	Essex	1943	1947	USAAF from 1944
RAF Worthy Down		England	Hampshire	1918	1938	Transferred to Royal Navy in 1939 as HMS Kestrel/HMS Ariel II. Now Worthy Down Camp
RAF Wortley		England	Yorkshire			
RAF Wratting Common	WW	England	Cambridgeshire	1943	1946	
RAF Wrexham		Wales	Denbighshire	1941	1945	Also known as RAF Borras
RAF Wroughton		England	Wiltshire	1940	1972	Became a Royal Navy Air Yard (RNAY) in 1972, now a depository of the Science Museum
RAF Hospital Wroughton		England	Wiltshire	1941	1996	Demolished in 2004, site sold for redevelopment.
RAF Wye		England	Kent	1916	1919	
RAF Wymeswold	WD	England	Leicestershire	1942	1957	
RAF Wythall		England	Worcestershire	1939	1959	
RAF Yatesbury		England	Wiltshire	1917	1969	
RAF Yeadon		England	Yorkshire	1939	1947	now Leeds Bradford Airport
RAF York		England	Yorkshire	1939	1946	Also known as RAF Clifton and RAF Rawcliffe
RAF Zeals		England	Wiltshire	1942	1946	

== Chain Home, Chain Home Low, Chain Home Extra Low, ROTOR and tropo-scatter stations ==
Notes: Some of the Chain Home Low sites were co-located with the larger Chain Home radars. Chain Home Extra Low equipment was co-located with "Chain Home" and "Chain Home Low" as well as at separate sites, but were of a less permanent nature, usually with mobile equipment.

ROTOR was the post war Radar interception system created from existing radar installations.

NARS, the North Atlantic Radio System, was an extension of the US Distant Early Warning system tropo-scatter communications network.

ACE High provided long-range communications for NATO.

Station	Country	County	Ordnance Survey National Grid	Notes
RAF Aird Uig	Scotland	Outer Hebrides	(NB 047390)	('WIU') CEW R10 ROTOR Radar Station on the Isle of Lewis.
RAF Anstruther	Scotland	Fife	(NO568808)	('FAT') R3 ROTOR Radar Station near Anstruther, Fife.
RAF Ash	England	Kent	(TR320586)	Near Woodnesborough
RAF Ballymartin	Northern Ireland	County Down		Chain Home Low (CHL)
RAF Bamburgh	England	Northumberland		CHL 41A/CEW/CHEL Site K157
RAF Bard Hill	England	Norfolk	(TG075428)	Coast defence (CD)/Chain Home Low radar station near Holt
RAF Barnton Quarry	Scotland	Lothian	(NT203748	('MHA') Rotor SOC and RSG near Edinburgh
RAF Bawburgh	England	Norfolk	(TG165080)	('WRK') former RAF Eastern Sector Control HQ, ROTOR Station and SOC near Norwich
RAF Bawdsey	England	Suffolk	(TM 347388)	CH, CHEL, ('PKD') R3 GCI (E) ROTOR Radar Station
RAF Beachy Head	England	Sussex	(TV 590959)	Chain Home Low (CHL)/CD M10, then (('HEB') CEW R1 ROTOR Radar Station)
RAF Beer Head	England	Devon	(SY 223882)	CHL 13A/CHEL K165
RAF Bempton	England	Yorkshire	(TA 192736)	near Bridlington, formerly RAF Flamborough Head – later developed as ('RMF') ROTOR R1 CEW station
RAF Ben Hough	Scotland	Tiree	(NL94874635)	Chain Home Low radar station on summit of Beinn Hough
RAF Binbrook	England	Lincolnshire		(UBIZ) – NATO ACE High Tropo-scatter LOS microwave terminal
RAF Blackhead	Northern Ireland	County Antrim		Chain Home Low
RAF Blackpool Tower	England	Lancashire	(SD306357)	Blackpool – AMES No. 64
RAF Blackgang	England	Isle of Wight	(SZ505766)	GCI station near Niton
RAF Bolt Tail	England	Devon		R6 ROTOR Radar Station adjacent to RAF Bolt Head
RAF Boniface Down	England	Isle of Wight		
RAF Botley Hill Farm	England	Surrey		NATO ACE High Tropo-scatter site
RAF Boulmer	England	Northumberland	(NU 240125)	('EZS') GCI R3 Type 80 ROTOR Radar Station & Control and Reporting Centre in the UK Air Surveillance and Control System
RAF Brandy Bay	England	Dorsetshire	(SY 8766479827)	Radar and GEE site near Tyneham
RAF Branscombe	England	Devon	(SY1988)	Chain Home Station CH13
RAF Brenish	Scotland	Western Isles	(NA9910024250)	Chain Home Radar Station. AMES No. 97
RAF Bride	Isle of Man		(SC463031)	
RAF Brizlee Wood	England	Northumberland		(UBOZ) – NATO ACE High Tropo-scatter site
RAF Broad Bay	Scotland	Western Isles	(NB5314034470)	Chain Home Radar Station
RAF Buchan	Scotland	Aberdeenshire	(NK 113408)	(former ROTOR R3 GCI Radar Station 'GBU')
RAF Calvo	England	Cumbria	(NY 144545)	('CAL' ROTOR R8 GCI Radar Station)
RAF Canewdon	England	Essex	(TQ9094)	Chain Home Radar Station CH22
RAF Carsaig	Scotland	Isle of Mull		CHL
RAF Castell Mawr	Wales	Anglesey	(SN5369)	Chain Home Station AMES No. 67
RAF Chenies	England	Buckinghamshire	(TQ 015997)	('HAM' R8 GCI ROTOR Station)
RAF Clee Hill	England	Shropshire		
RAF Cleadon	England	County Durham		Chain Home Low and OBOE Station
RAF Clett	Scotland	Shetland Islands		GCI Station
RAF Cockburnspath	Scotland	Borders		CHL
RAF Cocklaw	Scotland	Aberdeenshire		Chain Home Low Radar Station AMES No. 47B, near Peterhead
RAF Cold Hesledon	England	County Durham	(NZ 417468)	ROTOR R1 CEW/CHEL Station
RAF Coldblow Lane	England	Kent	(TQ824584)	(UMAZ) – NATO Ace High Tropospheric scatter site, near Detling
RAF Collafirth Hill	Scotland	Shetland		LOS (line of sight) microwave site for NATO ACE High.
RAF Comberton	England	Worcestershire	(SO 968461)	('COB' R8 GCI ROTOR Station)
RAF Crannoch Hill	Scotland	Banffshire		CD/CHL
RAF Craster	England	Northumberland		CD/CHL
RAF Creignish	Isle of Man			CHL
RAF Cresswell	England	Northumberland	(NZ2974892445)	
RAF Cricklade	England	Gloucestershire	(SU10459505)	GCI ("Happidrome") Radar Station
RAF Cromarty	Scotland	Ross and Cromarty		Chain Home Low Radar Station – AMES No. 48A
RAF Crosslaw	Scotland	Berwickshire		(CHEL R2 ROTOR Radar Station)
RAF Crustan	Scotland	Orkney Islands		CHL
RAF Dalby	Isle of Man		(SC2178)	
RAF Danby Beacon	England	North Yorkshire	(NZ732097)	CH/ROTOR station near Lealholm
RAF Deerness	Scotland	Orkney Islands		CHL
RAF Donna Nook	England	Lincolnshire		Chain Home Extra Low (CHEL) radar station, now offshore bombing range.
RAF Doonies Hill	Scotland	Aberdeen	(NJ 9666 0383)	Chain Home Low Station near Gregness
RAF Douglas Wood	Scotland	Angus	(NO4862041515)	Chain Home Radar Station near Monikie
RAF Dover	England	Kent	(TR3368043094)	Chain Home Station CH04
RAF Downderry	England	Cornwall		CH15 Radar Station
RAF Downhill	Northern Ireland	County Londonderry		
RAF Drone Hill	Scotland	Borders	(NT8447066535)	Chain Home radar station near Coldingham
RAF Dry Tree	England	Cornwall	(SW723218)	CH Station Goonhilly Downs
RAF Dunderhole Point	England	Cornwall		Coastal Defence/Chain Home Low station near Tintagel
RAF Dunkirk	England	Kent	(TR076595)	Chain Home station near Faversham
RAF Dunnet Head	Scotland	Caithness		Coast Defence U-boat (CDU) Radar Station near Thurso
RAF Dunwich	England	Suffolk		Chain Home Low Station CHL28A
RAF Easington	England	Yorkshire		CHEL (Chain Home Extra Low) near Easington
RAF Eorodale	Scotland	Isle of Lewis	(NB53196268)	Chain Home Low Radar Station
RAF Fair Isle	Scotland	Shetland		CDU station
RAF Fairlight	England	Sussex	(TQ 862113)	Chain Home Low Station CHL03A, later 'GWB' R2 CHEL(A) ROTOR Station
RAF Faraid Head	Scotland	Sutherland	(NC 389714)	('RAI' R10 CEW Rotor Radar Station)
RAF Folly	Wales	Pembrokeshire	(SM858195)	CFP Combined filter plot near Nolton
RAF Foreness Point	England	Kent	(TR 385710)	Chain Home Low Station CHL05A, later 'WJW' ROTOR R2 CHEL
RAF Formby	England	Lancashire		
RAF Fullarton	Scotland	Ayrshire		(R8 GCI ('FUL') Rotor Radar Station). Later RAF Gailes
RAF Glenarm	Northern Ireland	County Antrim		
RAF Goldsborough	England	Yorkshire	(NZ 830138)	near Whitby – 'JEX' R2 CHEL(A) ROTOR Radar Station
RAF Great Bromley	England	Essex	(TM104265)	
RAF Great Orme	Wales	Conwy		near Llandudno
RAF Greian Head	Scotland	Barra		
RAF Greystone	Northern Ireland	County Down		AMES No. 61
RAF Grutness	Scotland	Shetland Islands		near Sumburgh
RAF Hack Green	England	Cheshire	(SJ 647483)	'HAK' R6 GCI ROTOR Station
RAF Happisburgh	England	Norfolk		
RAF Hartland Point	England	Devon	(SS 237277)	'HAT' R8 GCI ROTOR Station
RAF Hawcoat	England	Lancashire		near Barrow in Furness
RAF Hawks Tor	England	Devon		near Plymouth
RAF Hayscastle Cross	Wales	Pembrokeshire	(SM920256)	CH Type 80
RAF High Street	England	Suffolk	(TM411720)	Chain Home Station CH28 in Darsham, near Saxmundham IP17 3QD
RAF Highdown Hill	England	Sussex		Chain Home Low station near Angmering
RAF Hillhead	Scotland	Aberdeenshire	(NJ9430061700)	CH Station near Memsie
RAF Holmpton	England	Yorkshire	(TA365227)	Radar – Support Command – UK Air CCIS – Now open to visitors
RAF Hope Cove	England	Devon	(SX 716374)	'HOP' R6 Rotor GCI Control Bunker
RAF Hopton	England	Norfolk	(TM 540990)	('TOH' CHEL(B) R2 ROTOR Radar Station)
RAF Humberstone	England	Lincolnshire		
RAF Hythe	England	Kent		
RAF Ingoldmells	England	Lincolnshire		
RAF Inverbervie	Scotland	Aberdeenshire	(NO 841734)	'LGZ' CEW R1 ROTOR Radar Station
RAF Islivig	Scotland	Isle of Lewis		
RAF Jacka	England	Cornwall		Chain Home Low station near Portloe
RAF Kelvedon Hatch	England	Essex	(TQ 561995)	'XSL' R4 SOC Metropolitan Sector, later a regional Civil Defence HQ, then a Cold War Government Command Post. Now the Kelvedon Hatch Secret Nuclear Bunker
RAF Kendrom	Scotland	Isle of Skye		Chain Home Low station near Kilmaluag
RAF Kete	Wales	Pembrokeshire		Also HMS Harrier (shore establishment) near Dale
RAF Kilchiaran	Scotland	Islay	(NR207616)	('ECK') CHEL R11 ROTOR Radar Station
RAF Kilkeel	Northern Ireland	County Down		AMES No. 78
RAF Kilkenneth	Scotland	Argyll and Bute	(NL9408045570)	Chain Home radar station near Tiree
RAF Killard Point	Northern Ireland	Islay		GCI Station, subsite of RAF Bishops Court
RAF Kingswear	England	Devon		Chain Home Low
RAF Kinley Hill	England	County Durham		Chain Home Low station near Seaham
RAF Langley Lane	England	Lancashire		near Goosnargh – ROC Group HQ No 21, UKWMO National War HQ & Rotor SOC. Langley Lane Sector Operation Centre & Filter Room
RAF Langtoft	England	Lincolnshire		(('LAT'): R6 GCI ROTOR Radar Station)
RAF Loth	Scotland	Sutherland	(NC9590009600)	Chain Home radar station near Helmsdale
RAF Mark's Castle	England	Cornwall		CHL17A, near Land's End
RAF Minehead	England	Somerset		
RAF Mormond Hill	Scotland			(UMOZ) – LOS microwave TxRx site for NATO ACE High
RAF Mossy Bottom	England	Sussex		Chain Home Low station near Shoreham
RAF Mossy Hill	Scotland	Shetland		NATO Ace High Tropo-scatter site
RAF Navidale	Scotland	Sutherland	(ND 03750 15800)	CHL and CHEL Radar Station near Helmsdale
RAF Needles	England	Isle of Wight		CHL/CD
RAF Nefyn	Wales	Gwynedd	(SH2704037575)	AMES No. 66
RAF Netherbutton	Scotland	Orkney	(HY4621104396)	Chain Home radar station near Holm
RAF Newchurch	England	Kent	(TR0531)	CHL/CD
RAF North Cairn	Scotland	Dumfries	(NW97107074)	Near Stranraer – AMES No. 60
RAF North Foreland	England	Kent		Chain Home Low
RAF Northam	England	Devon	(SS4529)	Chain Home Low radar station
RAF Noss Hil	Scotland	Shetland Islands	(HU3613015575)	Chain Home, AMES No. 54
RAF Orby	England	Lincolnshire		GCI station
RAF Ottercops Moss	England	Northumberland	(NY944896)	near Otterburn, Northumberland
RAF Oxenhope Moor	England	Yorkshire	(SE 0141437082)	Radar and GEE site near Halifax
RAF Oxwich	Wales	South Glamorgan		(CD/CHL) radar station near Swansea
RAF Patrington	England	Yorkshire		see RAF Holmpton
RAF Pen Oliver	England	Cornwall		Chain Home Low station near The Lizard
RAF Pen y Bryn	Wales	Caernarfonshire		Chain Home Low station
RAF Pevensey	England	Sussex	(TQ644073)	Chain Home radar station
RAF Point of Stoer	Scotland	Sutherland		Chain Home Low Radar Station
RAF Poling	England	Sussex	(TQ043052)	Chain Home Station CH08, CHEL. First Radar Station to have WAAF operators.
RAF Port Mor	Scotland	Argyll and Bute	(NL9442)	Advanced Chain Home radar station on Tiree
RAF Portland	England	Dorsetshire		(CEW R1 ROTOR Radar Station ('NIB'))
RAF Prestatyn	Wales	Denbighshire	(SJ079819)	(('SYP') CHEL R11 ROTOR Radar Station)
RAF Rame Head	England	Cornwall		Chain Home Low station CHL15A
RAF Ravenscar	England	North Yorkshire		Chain Home Low Radar Station, later CEW
RAF Rhuddlan	Wales	Denbighshire	(SJ012764)	AMES No. 65
RAF Ringstead	England	Dorsetshire	(SY751817)	NATO Ace High Tropospheric scatter site near Ringstead Bay
RAF Roddans Port	Northern Ireland	County Down		Chain Home Low
RAF Rodel Park	Scotland	Western Isles		Chain Home Low station near Rodel, Harris
RAF Rosehearty	Scotland	Aberdeenshire		CHL and 10 cm Radar Station, also Bombing Range
RAF Rye	England	Kent	(TQ968232)	Chain Home radar station – misleadingly located in Brookland, Kent (place named-for, Rye, just across border in Sussex)
RAF Saligo Bay	Scotland	Argyll and Bute	(NR2116066740)	Islay
RAF Sandwich	England	Kent		('YTM') R3 GCI ROTOR near Ash
RAF Sango	Scotland	Sutherland	(NC4170067500)	near Durness
RAF Saxa Vord	Scotland	Shetland Islands		near Unst – (R10 CEW Rotor Radar Station)
RAF Scarinish	Scotland	Tiree	(NM032456)	('FLY') GCI R8 ROTOR Radar Station
RAF Scarlett	Isle of Man		(SC2566)	
RAF Schoolhill	Scotland	Aberdeenshire	(NO9086098180)	Chain Home station near Portlethen
RAF Seaton Snook	England	County Durham	(NZ 519280)	('DYR') GCI R3 ROTOR Radar Station
RAF Sennen	England	Cornwall	(SW376246)	Chain Home Low and GEE Station
RAF Skaw	Scotland	Shetland Islands	(HP6634016805)	Chain Home and LORAN station near Unst
RAF Southbourne	England	Dorsetshire	(SZ1591)	Chain Home station
RAF Shipton	England	Yorkshire		('KFY') R4 ROTOR Sector Operations Centre & SRHQ 21 / RGHQ 2.1)
RAF Shotton	England	County Durham		Chain Home Low station
RAF Skendleby	England	Lincolnshire		Chain Home Overseas Low (COL 161), later Chain Home Extra Low Station CHL34A, then 'UPI' ROTOR R3 GCI
RAF Snaefell	Isle of Man		(SC397869)	('MOI') CHEL R11 ROTOR Radar Station
RAF Sopley	England	Hampshire		(('AVO') 'R3' GCI ROTOR Station)
RAF South Ronaldsay	Scotland	Orkney		CHL / CHEL Radar Station ) AMES No. 50A
RAF South Stack	Wales	Anglesey		
RAF St Anne's	England	Lancashire		ROTOR site near Blackpool
RAF St Bees Head	England	Cumbria		Chain Home Low No. 87A
RAF St Cyrus	Scotland	Aberdeenshire		CHL/CD Radar Station -AMES No. 45A
RAF St Lawrence	England	Isle of Wight	(SZ530760)	Chain Home station
RAF St Margaret's Bay	England	Kent		ROTOR site
RAF St Twynnells	Wales	Pembrokeshire	(SR94189741)	('TWY') GCI R6 ROTOR Radar Station
RAF Staxton Wold	England	Yorkshire	(TA023778)	Chain Home station
RAF Stenigot	England	Lincolnshire	(TF256827)	near Louth, Lincolnshire – (Chain Home (CH) and ACE High tropo-scatter), still in use for training aerial erectors.
RAF Stoke Holy Cross	England	Norfolk	(TG257028)	Chain Home station
RAF Strumble Head	Wales	Pembrokeshire	(SM 887 394)	Chain Home Low radar station
RAF Swansea Bay	Wales	Glamorgan		Operations/plotting Room
RAF Swingate Down	England	Kent	(TR3382343186)	CH Low station near Dover. Also called RAF St Margarets
RAF Tannach	Scotland	Caithness	(ND3200046900)	Chain Home radar station near Wick
RAF The Law	Scotland	Angus		Chain Home Low station near Carnoustie
RAF Trelanvean	England	Cornwall	(SW762193)	Goonhilly Downs
RAF Treleaver	England	Cornwall	(SW766174)	(ROTOR: GCI Station)
RAF Trerew	England	Cornwall	(SW812585)	Newquay – (Chain Home CH18 & ROTOR Radar Station)
RAF Trevose Head	England	Cornwall		Chain Home Low
RAF Trewan Sands	England	Cornwall	(SH322754)	('TES') R8 GCI ROTOR Radar Station
RAF Trimingham	England	Norfolk	(TG289382)	Chain Home Extra Low (CHEL)/CD, then 'QLE' CEW R1 ROTOR Radar Station
RAF Truleigh Hill	England	Sussex	(TQ 226 107)	Chain Home Low Station CHL07B later ROTOR R2 bunker near Bramber
RAF Ulbster	Scotland	Caithness		near Wick
RAF Uxbridge	England	Greater London		NATO ACE High Tropo-scatter site
RAF Ventnor	England	Isle of Wight	(SZ568785)	Chain Home CH10, CHL M86, ROTOR Station 'OJC'
RAF Walton on Naze	England	Essex		Chain Home Low
RAF Warden Point	England	Kent		Chain Home Low station on the Isle of Sheppey
RAF Wartling	England	Sussex	(TQ653074)	(('ZUN') R3 GCI ROTOR Radar Station) near Bexhill-on-Sea
RAF Watsness	Scotland	Shetland		Chain Home Low station near Walls. AMES No. 55A
RAF Warren	Wales	Pembrokeshire	(SR92459757)	Chain Home station
RAF West Beckham	England	Norfolk		Chain Home Radar station
RAF West Prawle	England	Devon	(SX771374)	CH 14/CHL 14A
RAF Westburn	Scotland	Aberdeenshire		CD/CHL. AMES No M23
RAF Westcliff	England	Dorsetshire		near Isle of Portland
RAF West Myne	England	Somerset	(SS928486)	('ZEM') CHEL R11 ROTOR Radar Station
RAF Whale Head	Scotland	Orkney Islands	(HY7590546125)	Chain Home AMES No. 51 on Sanday
RAF Whitehawk	England	Sussex		Chain Home Low and 10 cm Radar Station near Brighton
RAF Whitstable	England	Kent		Chain Home Low
RAF Wick	Scotland	Highland		(R8 GCI Rotor Radar Station)
RAF Worth Matravers	England	Dorsetshire	(SY967777)	Chain Home and GEE site near Swanage
RAF Wylfa	Wales	Isle of Anglesey	(SH3522093385)	AMES No. 76

== Overseas ==
=== Europe ===
During the First World War (1914–1918), and for a short period afterwards, there were at least 250 recognised airfields in France that the Royal Flying Corps, Royal Naval Air Service, and Royal Air Force used at various times.

Station	Country	Location	opened	closed	Notes
RAF Klagenfurt	Austria	46°38′41″N 14°19′30″E	1945	1946	Now Klagenfurt Airport
RAF Schwechat	Austria	48°06′51″N 16°33′49″E	1945	1954?	now Vienna International Airport
RAF Ayios Nikolaos	Cyprus	35°05′35″N 33°53′12″E	1956	1999	Now Ayios Nikolaos Station, joint service electronic intelligence gathering site
RAF Cape Greco	Cyprus	34°57′42″N 34°04′55″E	1956	1959	751 Signals Unit 1956–59. ACE High tropo-scatter site
RAF Nicosia	Cyprus	35°08′56″N 33°16′39″E	1930s	1966	Still owned by the Ministry of Defence but used by the UN
Tymbou Airfield	Cyprus	35°09′12″N 33°29′46″E		1950s	
RAF Eide	Faroe Islands				Radar station
RAF Nolsoy	Faroe Islands				Radar station
RAF Suduroy	Faroe Islands				Radar station
RAF Sandoy	Faroe Islands				Radar station
RAF Torshavn	Faroe Islands				Joint RAF/RN radar Control Centre
RAF Vaagar	Faroe Islands				? now Vágar Airport
RAF Ajaccio	France	41°55′15″N 8°47′52″E	1943	1946	Now Ajaccio Napoleon Bonaparte Airport, Corsica. Formerly Campo dell’Oro airbase used by Vichy, then Free French Air Forces.
RAF Saint Inglevert	France	50°52′56″N 01°44′09″E			First World War airfield at Saint-Inglevert, Pas-de-Calais. A later civil airfield on a different site was used during the early part of the Second World War. Now Saint-Inglevert Airfield
RAF Ahlhorn	Germany	52°53′11″N 8°13′47″E	1945	1958	Initially designated "B.111 Ahlhorn". Became Ahlhorner Heide Air Base. Now Südsiedlung Ahlhorn.
RAF Bad Eilsen	Germany		1945	1954	Headquarters of the British Air Force of Occupation
RAF Bruggen	Germany	51°11′56″N 6°07′55″E	1940s	2015	Now industrial complex "Javelinpark"
RAF Bückeburg	Germany	52°16′39″N 09°05′09″E			now Bückeburg Air Base
RAF Butzweilerhof	Germany	50°59′04″N 06°53′16″E			
RAF Celle	Germany	52°35′37″N 10°01′57″E	1945	1957	now Celle Air Base
RAF Detmold (Hobart Barracks)	Germany	51°56′37″N 08°54′06″E	1946	1957	Local airfield & industrial estate
RAF Fassberg	Germany	52°54′51″N 10°11′15″E	1945	1957	now Faßberg Air Base initially designated "B.152 Fassberg"
RAF Fuhlsbüttel	Germany	53°37′49″N 09°59′27″E	1940s	1950s	now Hamburg Airport. B.168
RAF Gatow	Germany	52°28′15″N 13°08′23″E	1945	1994	
RAF Geilenkirchen	Germany	50°57′38″N 06°02′23″E	1953	1968	Now NATO Air Base Geilenkirchen
RAF Gütersloh	Germany	51°55′21″N 08°18′19″E			Originally Y.99, now a British Army Garrison, called "Princess Royal Barracks, Gutersloh"
RAF Hambühren	Germany		1953	1957	A Signals Wing and 2 Signal Units.
RAF Hehn	Germany				ACE High site (abb – Moenchengladbach Tail (1) – Hehn) AHEZ – Hehn
RAF Hustedt	Germany				subsite of RAF Celle
RAF Husum	Germany				A remote radar station on the coast near Husum, Schleswig-Holstein – initially designated "B.172 Husum"
RAF Jever	Germany	53°32′02″N 07°53′11″E	1952	1961	Now Jever Air Base
RAF Laarbruch	Germany	51°36′09″N 06°08′25″E			Initially designated "B.100 Goch". now in civilian use, under the name Weeze (or Niederrhein) Airport (NRN/EDLV)
RAF Lübeck	Germany	53°48′14″N 10°42′45″E	1945	1949	also known as RAF Blankensee; Initially designated "B.158 Lübeck". Now Lübeck Airport
RAF Nordhorn	Germany				Bombing Range
RAF Oldenburg	Germany	53°10′47″N 08°09′47″E		1957	Oldenburg Air Base
RAF Putlos	Germany				?
RAF Rheindahlen	Germany	51°10′28″N 06°18′34″E			formerly occupied by the British Army, as HQ United Kingdom Support Command (Germany) (HQ UKSC(G))
RAF Hospital Rinteln	Germany			1953	Under RAF command till opening of the new RAF Hospital Wegberg in 1953.
RAF Hospital Rostop	Germany				Originally known as No. 1 Mobile Field Hospital deployed following closure of BMH Oldenburg.
RAF Scharfoldendorf	Germany				Signals base. Used by No. 5 (Signals) Wing RAF
RAF Schleswigland	Germany	54°27′34″N 09°30′59″E	1945	1958	Initially designated "B.164 Schleswig".
RAF Sundern	Germany				Handed over to British Army Westfalen Garrison, called "Mansergh Barracks"
RAF Sylt	Germany	54°54′48″N 08°20′26″E	1945; 1949	1948; 1961	now Sylt Airport. Initially designated "B.170 Westerland"
RAF Uetersen	Germany	53°38′49″N 09°42′16″E	1945	1955	now Uetersen Airfield and German Airforce NCO Training School
RAF Wahn	Germany	50°51′57″N 07°08′34″E			now Cologne Bonn Airport
RAF Hospital Wegberg	Germany				now occupied by the British Army, as HQ British Forces Germany Health Service (BFGHS)
RAF Hospital Westerland (Sylt)	Germany				
RAF Wildenrath	Germany	51°06′50″N 06°12′49″E	1952	1993	
RAF Winterberg	Germany				GEE site – Master Winterberg AMES 7932
RAF Wunstorf	Germany	52°27′17″N 09°25′44″E			now Wunstorf Air Base
RAF New Camp	Gibraltar	36°08′56″N 05°20′30″W			Now Devil's Tower Camp
RAF North Front	Gibraltar	36°08′58″N 05°20′50″W	1942	1966	Former name of RAF Gibraltar
RAF Augusta	Italy	37°14′40″N 15°11′57″E	1945	1945	Sicily
RAF Bari/Palese	Italy	41°08′26″N 16°47′17″E	1943	1946	Now Bari Karol Wojtyła Airport
RAF Brindisi	Italy	40°39′09″N 17°56′52″E	1943	1946	now Brindisi Airport
RAF Catania	Italy	37°28′00″N 15°03′50″E			now Catania–Fontanarossa Airport (Sardinia)
RAFSU Decimomannu	Italy			26/09/1997	RAF Servicing Unit. Sardinia. Armament Practice and Air Combat Manoeuvring Camp. Controlled by Royal Air Force Germany. Two different Light Warning Sets.
RAF Elmas	Italy	39°14′52″N 09°03′30″E	1943	1946	Cagliari. Now Cagliari Elmas Airport, Sardinia
RAF Pomigliano	Italy				
RAF Trigno	Italy	42°03′52″N 14°47′17″E	1943	1945	No. 80 Sq 13 March ~ 10 April 1944; No. 208 Sq 17 March ~ 1 May 1944; No. 241 Sq 7 April ~ 1 June 1944; No. 318 Sq 1 May 1944 ~ 17 June 1944; USAAF Emergency Field 1944 ~ May 1945

=== Rest of the world ===
station	country	location	opened	closed	notes
RAF Hiswa	(Aden Colony) Aden Protectorate	12°49′25″N 44°54′20″E		1944	aka RNAS Hiswa / HMS Sheba No. 1566 Meteorologicial Flight RAF (25 March – 4 September 1944)
RAF Khormaksar	(Aden Colony) Aden Protectorate	12°49′46″N 45°01′44″E		1967	The largest RAF station in Arabia and a staging post for aircraft travelling to the Far East. Now Aden International Airport.
RAF Riyan	(Aden Colony) Aden Protectorate	14°38′27″N 49°20′22″E	1945	1960s	Situated 3 miles south-west of current Riyan International Airport, a small route station for the refuelling of aircraft in transit
RAF Sheikh Othman	(Aden Colony) Aden Protectorate	12°52′44″N 44°58′03″E	1940	1950	
RAF Steamer Point	(Aden Colony) Aden Protectorate				headquarters / administrative facility
RAF Hospital Steamer Point	(Aden Colony) Aden Protectorate	12°47′06″N 44°58′51″E			Hospital
RAF Hospital Khormaksar Beach	(Aden Colony) Aden Protectorate	12°49′51″N 45°01′44″E			In RAF Khormaksar Airfield grounds
RAF Kandahar	Islamic Republic of Afghanistan	31°30′28″N 65°51′32″E	2006	2014	Main operating airfield in Afghanistan for the RAF
RAF Blida	Algeria	36°30′09″N 02°48′38″E	1942	1946	now Blida Airport
RAF Bone	Algeria	36°49′45″N 07°48′50″E	1942	1945	now Rabah Bitat Airport
RAF Jemappes	Algeria	near Azzaba			Farmland. 43 & 253 Sqns
RAF Maison Blanche	Algeria	36°41′27″N 03°12′55″E	1942	1943	now Houari Boumediene Airport
RAF Setif	Algeria	36°10′40″N 05°19′45″E		1945	now Ain Arnat Airport
RAF Tingley	Algeria	36°49′11″N 07°36′20″E			Near El Bouni. Farmland
RAF Lagens	Azores	38°46′18″N 27°05′45″E	1943	1946	now Lajes Field
RAF Muharraq; RAF Bahrain	Bahrain	26°16′28″N 50°38′09″E	1943	1971	now Bahrain International Airport
RAF Ursel	Belgium	51°18′32″N 3°28′01″E	1944	1957	Initially designated "B.67 Ursel". Now Ursel Air Base
RAF Belize	Belize	17°32′29″N 88°18′32″W	1970s	1993	Headquarters at Airport Camp, Ladyville
RAF Darrell's Island	Bermuda	32°16′30″N 64°49′12″W	1939	1945	Now slipway. Royal Air Force, Bermuda (1939–1945)
Kindley Air Force Base	Bermuda	32°22′05″N 64°41′11″W	1943	1995	Joint RAF Transport Command/USAAF base
RAF Kuching	(Crown Colony of Sarawak) Sarawak				Now Kuching International Airport
RAF Labuan	(Crown Colony of North Borneo) North Borneo				Now Labuan Airport
RAF Tawau	(Crown Colony of North Borneo) North Borneo				Now Tawau Airport
RAF Akyab	(British rule in Burma) Burma		1941	1946	Now Sittwe Airport
RAF Dabaing	(British rule in Burma) Burma				
RAF Hmawbi	(British rule in Burma) Burma				Hmawbi Air Base, Myanmar Air Force
RAF Meiktila	(British rule in Burma) Burma				Meiktila Air Base, Myanmar Air Force Central Command
RAF Mergui	(British rule in Burma) Burma				
RAF Mingaladon	(British rule in Burma) Burma				Mingaladon Air Base HQ, Myanmar Air Force
RAF Pegu	(British rule in Burma) Burma				Taungoo Air Base, Myanmar Air Force
RAF Battambang	Cambodia				
RAF Mondulkiri	Cambodia				
RAF Stung Treng	Cambodia				
RAF Charlottetown	Canada		1941	1944	RCAF field commanded by RAF officer; No. 31 General Reconnaissance School and No. 32 Air Navigation School (1941–1944) to RCAF Station Charlottetown
RAF Dorval	Canada		1941	1946	to RCAF Station Lachine. Now Montréal–Pierre Elliott Trudeau International Airport
RAF(U) Goose Bay	Canada		1949	2005	now CFB Goose Bay, see Newfoundland (Country)
RAF China Bay	(British Ceylon) Ceylon		1930	1957	– now SLAF China Bay
Colombo Racecourse Airstrip	(British Ceylon) Ceylon			1940s	Re-converted back to racecourse following World War II
RAF Ekala	(British Ceylon) Ceylon				
RAF Gangodawila	(British Ceylon) Ceylon				
RAF Kandy	(British Ceylon) Ceylon		1941	1946	
RAF Kankesanturai	(British Ceylon) Ceylon		1941	1945	now SLAF Palaly
RAF Koggala	(British Ceylon) Ceylon		1940	1947	now SLAF Koggala
RAF Mawatagama	(British Ceylon) Ceylon				
RAF Minneriya	(British Ceylon) Ceylon		1942	1945	now SLAF Hingurakgoda
RAF Negombo	(British Ceylon) Ceylon		1946	1957	now the Bandaranaike International Airport & SLAF Katunayake
RAF Ratmalana; RAF Colombo	(British Ceylon) Ceylon		1941	1946	– now SLAF Ratmalana
RAF Sigiriya	(British Ceylon) Ceylon		1942	1945	– now SLAF Sigiriya
RAF Trincomalee	(British Ceylon) Ceylon				See China Bay
RAF Vavuniya	(British Ceylon) Ceylon		1942	1945	– now SLAF Vavuniya
RAF Cocos Islands	Cocos (Keeling) Islands		1942	1946	
RAF Aboukir	Egypt		1916	1947	home to the Central Depot of RAF Middle East until 1939, also known as LG-34
RAF Abu Sueir	Egypt		1917	1956	also known as LG-205, now Abu Suwayr Air Base
RAF Abu Sultan	Egypt		1942	1955	
RAF Almaza	Egypt				Also known as LG-245, now Almaza Air Base
RAF Cairo West	Egypt		1942	1946	also known as LG-224 and Kilo 26
RAF Deversoir	Egypt		1942	1953	also known as LG-209 and Kilo 61
RAF El Amiriya	Egypt		1919	1947	also recorded as El Rimal (1917–18)
RAF El Ballah	Egypt		1942	1945	also known as LG-203 or RAF Ballah
RAF El Daba	Egypt		1942	1945	also known as LG-105
RAF El Hamra	Egypt				
RAF Fayid	Egypt		1940	1953	lso known as LG-211
RAF Gianaclis	Egypt				also known as LG-226
RAF Heliopolis	Egypt		1919	1946	also known as LG-218
RAF Helwan	Egypt	29°49′18″N 31°19′49″E	1918	1944	also known as LG-221
RAF Idku	Egypt		1941	1945	also known as LG-229
RAF Ismailia	Egypt				Also known as LG-204, now Al Ismailiyah Air Base
RAF Kabrit	Egypt		1941	1954	also known as LG-213. Now Kibrit Air Base(Canal Zone)
RAF Kasfareet	Egypt				Also known as LG-212
RAF Matruh West	Egypt				Also known as LG-07 and 'Z' LG.
RAF Mersa Matruh	Egypt				Also known as LG-87
RAF Shallufa	Egypt		1918 1940	1919 1948	Also known as LG-215
RAF Shandur	Egypt		1941	1943	Also known as LG-214
RAF Suez	Egypt		1919 1941	1921 1943	Also known as LGs-216 & 217
RAF Asmara	(United Kingdom) British Military Administration (Eritrea)		1940	1950	Now Asmara International Airport
RAF Stanley	Falkland Islands		1980s		
RAF Kelly's Garden	Falkland Islands		1980s		
RAF Navy Point	Falkland Islands		1980s		
RAF Christmas Island	Gilbert and Ellice Islands		1956	1957	now Cassidy International Airport, Kiritimati
RAF Bathurst	British Gambia		1941	1945	
RAF Half Die	British Gambia		1941	1945	
RAF Jeswang	British Gambia		1941	1943	
RAF Yundum	British Gambia				Now Banjul International Airport
RAF Accra	(Gold Coast (British colony)) Gold Coast		1941	1946	Now Accra International Airport and Accra Air Force Station
RAF Takoradi	(Gold Coast (British colony)) Gold Coast				Now Takoradi Airport main hub for Ghana Air Force
RAF Ho Man Tin (Ho Mum Tin)	(British Hong Kong) Hong Kong				No. 393 Equipment Depot on Good Shepherd Street (now but Cascades Block) 1946–1947. Family Residence on Ho Man Tin Hill Road present into 1970s but since demolished for Crescent Mansion residential block.
RAF Kai Tak	(British Hong Kong) Hong Kong		1927	1978	by RAF; transferred to Royal Hong Kong Auxiliary Air Force 1978–1993 and Government Flying Service 1993–1998; now being redeveloped as cruise ship terminal and other uses
RAF Little Sai Wan	(British Hong Kong) Hong Kong		1947	1980s	by RAF and allies for intelligence gathering from China; demolished and now residential development. Also known as Siu Sai Wan
RAF Sek Kong	(British Hong Kong) Hong Kong		1950 1992	1980 1997	now home to People's Liberation Army Air Force helicopter squadron (PLAAF Helicopter Regiment 39968) 1997–present
RAF Shatin	(British Hong Kong) Hong Kong		1949	1970s	by RAF and Army Air Corps (United Kingdom) (1950s–1960s); redeveloped as residential housing
RAF Tai Mo Shan	(British Hong Kong) Hong Kong				(Project Cabbage Leaf) – ex RAF and current Hong Kong Observatory weather radar station
RAF Kaldadarnes	Iceland		1940	1943	
RAF Olfus	Iceland				TRU radar station – later transferred to US becoming 'Camp Hughes'
RAF Reykjavik	Iceland				
RAF Vik	Iceland				COL radar station
RAF Agartala	(British Raj) British Indian Empire				now Agartala Air Force Station
RAF Agra	(British Raj) British Indian Empire		1919 1944	1920 1946	now Agra Air Force Station
RAF Alipore	(British Raj) British Indian Empire	22°30′57″N 88°18′56″E			heavily overbuilt, minimal remains (2024); not Behala Airport
RAF Allahabad	(British Raj) British Indian Empire				now Bamrauli Air Force Station
RAF Amarda Road	(British Raj) British Indian Empire#	21°48′18″N 087°02′49″E			
RAF Ambala	(British Raj) British Indian Empire		1916 1939	1926 1947	now Ambala Air Force Station
RAF Arkonam	(British Raj) British Indian Empire		1942	1945	Now INS Rajali, a Naval Air Station under Indian Navy.
RAF Asansol	(British Raj) British Indian Empire		1941	1944	now Burnpur Airport
RAF Baigachi	(British Raj) British Indian Empire		1942	1946	
RAF Barrackpore	(British Raj) British Indian Empire				now Barrackpore Air Force Station
RAF Bhopal	(British Raj) British Indian Empire		1943	1946	now Raja Bhoj Airport
RAF Car Nicobar	(British Raj) British Indian Empire				now Car Nicobar Air Force Base
RAF Chakeri	(British Raj) British Indian Empire				now Chakeri Air Force Station
RAF Chaklala	(British Raj) British Indian Empire		1935	1947	now Benazir Bhutto International Airport and PAF Base Nur Khan
RAF Chakulia	(British Raj) British Indian Empire	22.467907°N 86.701441°E	1942	1946	
RAF Chittagong	(British Raj) British Indian Empire				now Shah Amanat International Airport, Bangladesh
RAF Comilla	(British Raj) British Indian Empire		1942	1946	now Comilla Airport
RAF Cox's Bazaar	(British Raj) British Indian Empire				now Cox's Bazar Airport, Bangladesh
RAF Cholovaram	(British Raj) British Indian Empire	13.210161°N 80.152304°E	1942	1945	
RAF Din Jan	(British Raj) British Indian Empire	27.537996°N 95.269702°E	1941	1942	
RAF Dhubalia	(British Raj) British Indian Empire	23.492985°N 88.454018°E			
RAF Digri	(British Raj) British Indian Empire	22.787447°N 87.361721°E			
RAF Drigh Road; RAF Karachi	(British Raj) British Indian Empire				Now Pakistan Air Force Base Faisal
RAF Dum Dum	(British Raj) British Indian Empire		1940	1947	now Netaji Subhash Chandra Bose International Airport
RAF Fatehjang	(British Raj) British Indian Empire		1944	1946	33.548262°N 72.632119°E
RAF Gujrat	(British Raj) British Indian Empire	32.615464°N 74.070798°E			
RAF Hakimpet	(British Raj) British Indian Empire				Now Hakimpet Air Force Station
RAF Imphal	(British Raj) British Indian Empire				now Imphal Airport
RAF Jharsuguda	(British Raj) British Indian Empire				now Jharsuguda Airport
RAF Jessore	(British Raj) British Indian Empire				Now Jessore Airport
RAF Jiwani	(British Raj) British Indian Empire				Now Jiwani Airport
RAF Jodhpur	(British Raj) British Indian Empire				Now Jodhpur Air Force Station
RAF Kalyan	(British Raj) British Indian Empire				See Kalyan Airstrip
RAF Kanchrapara	(British Raj) British Indian Empire				See Kanchrapara Airfield
RAF Kohat	(British Raj) British Indian Empire				See Kohat Air Base
RAF Kolar	(British Raj) British Indian Empire	13.187627°N 78.163979°E			
RAF Korangi Creek	(British Raj) British Indian Empire				Now Pakistan Air Force Base Korangi
RAF Lahore	(British Raj) British Indian Empire				
RAF Maharajpur	(British Raj) British Indian Empire				now Maharajpur Air Force Station
RAF Mauripur	(British Raj) British Indian Empire			1956	now Pakistan Air Force Base Masroor
RAF Nagpur	(British Raj) British Indian Empire				Now Dr. Babasaheb Ambedkar International Airport and AFS Nagpur
RAF Ondal	(British Raj) British Indian Empire	23.594300°N 87.224377°E			
RAF Palam; RAF Delhi	(British Raj) British Indian Empire		1943	1947	now Indira Gandhi International Airport
RAF Peshawar	(British Raj) British Indian Empire				Now Pakistan Air Force Base Peshawar
RAF Poona	(British Raj) British Indian Empire				now Lohegaon Air Force Station
RAF Quetta	(British Raj) British Indian Empire				Now Pakistan Air Force Base Samungli
RAF Ranchi	(British Raj) British Indian Empire				now Birsa Munda Airport
RAF Redhills Lake	(British Raj) British Indian Empire				Flying boat and seaplane base
RAF Risalpur	(British Raj) British Indian Empire				Now PAF Base Risalpur/Pakistan Air Force Academy
RAF Salbani	(British Raj) British Indian Empire	22°36′43″N 87°17′55″E	1942	1946	
RAF Santa Cruz	(British Raj) British Indian Empire				now Chhatrapati Shivaji Maharaj International Airport
RAF Sargodha	(British Raj) British Indian Empire				Now Pakistan Air Force Base Mushaf
RAF Secunderabad	(British Raj) British Indian Empire				now Hakimpet Air Force Station
RAF Srinagar	(British Raj) British Indian Empire				now Srinagar Air Force Station
RAF St Thomas Mount	(British Raj) British Indian Empire				now Chennai International Airport
RAF Tambaram	(British Raj) British Indian Empire				now Tambaram Air Force Station
RAF Trichinopoly	(British Raj) British Indian Empire				Also known as RAF Golden Rock/Kajamalai, now Tiruchirapalli International Airport
RAF Vizagapatam	(British Raj) British Indian Empire				now INS Dega
RAF Willingdon	(British Raj) British Indian Empire				now Safdarjung Airport
RAF Yelahanka; RAF Bangalore	(British Raj) British Indian Empire				now Yelahanka Air Force Station, Bangalore, Karnataka
RAF Tehran	Iran				Now Mehrabad International Airport
RAF Basrah	Iraq		1916 2006	1946 2009	now Basra International Airport
RAF Dhibban	Iraq		1936	1938	renamed to RAF Habbaniya in 1938)
RAF Habbaniya	Iraq		1938	1959	renamed from RAF Dhibban in 1938
RAF Hinaidi	Iraq				
RAF Shaibah	Iraq				
RAF H1	Iraq		1920s	1940s	Used as a relief landing ground during the 1920s to 1940s by 84 Squadron. Near Jordanian border
RAF H2	Iraq		1920s	1940s	Used as a relief landing ground during the 1920s to 1940s by 84 Squadron. Near Jordanian border
RAF H3	Iraq		1920s	1940s	Used as a relief landing ground during the 1920s to 1940s by 84 Squadron. Near Jordanian border
RAF Iwakuni	Allied Occupied Japan		1946	1951	
RAF Zerqa	Jordan				became Dawson's Field (Dawson's Field hijackings)
RAF Mafraq	Jordan				
RAF Eastleigh; RAF Nairobi	(East Africa Protectorate) Kenya		1929	1951	now Moi Air Base
RAF Kisumu	(East Africa Protectorate) Kenya				
RAF Nakuru	(East Africa Protectorate) Kenya				
RAF Port Reitz; RAF Mombasa	(East Africa Protectorate) Kenya				Now Moi International Airport
RAF Thika	(East Africa Protectorate) Kenya				
RAF Beirut	Lebanon		1941	1945	
RAF Benina	(United Kingdom) Allied Occupation of Libya		1942	1944	now Benina International Airport
RAF Castel Benito	(United Kingdom) Allied Occupation of Libya				later RAF Idris(1952) now Tripoli International Airport
RAF Derna	(United Kingdom) Allied Occupation of Libya				
RAF El Adem; RAF Tobruk	(United Kingdom) Allied Occupation of Libya				Also LG-144, now Gamal Abdul El Nasser Air Base
RAF Gambut	(United Kingdom) Allied Occupation of Libya				also known as RAF Kambut and LG-139
RAF Mellaha	(United Kingdom) Allied Occupation of Libya				Also Wheelus Air Base, now Mitiga International Airport
RAF Butterworth	(Straits Settlements) British Malaya			1957	thereafter RAAF Butterworth, now RMAF Butterworth
RAF Kota Bharu	(Straits Settlements) British Malaya				now Sultan Ismail Petra Airport
RAF Kuala Lumpur	(Straits Settlements) British Malaya				now RMAF Kuala Lumpur
RAF Kuantan	(Straits Settlements) British Malaya				now RMAF Kuantan
RAF Penang	(Straits Settlements) British Malaya				
RAF Gan	Maldives		1950s	1970s	now Gan International Airport
RAF Hithadhoo	Maldives				(domestic site for RAF Gan)
RAF Hal Far	Malta		1923	1967	now an Armed Forces of Malta base – B Coy, 1st Regt
RAF Kalafrana	Malta				also known as RAF Calafrana
RAF Krendi	Malta				also known as RAF Qrendi
RAF Luqa	Malta		1940	1979	now the site of Malta International Airport
RAF Madalena	Malta				Radar Station (with Type 80 Radar)
RAF Safi	Malta				Support base for RAF Luqa
RAF Siggiewi	Malta				Home of No 840 Signals Unit
RAF Ta Kali	Malta				(Ta' Qali)
RAF Mauritius	British Mauritius				
RAF Oujda	Morocco				Now Angads Airport
RAF Rabat Sale	Morocco				Now Rabat–Salé Airport
RAF Eindhoven	Netherlands				(B.78) now Eindhoven Airport
RAF Woensdrecht	Netherlands				(B.79) now Woensdrecht Airbase
RAF Schijndel	Netherlands				(B.85)
RAF Twente	Netherlands				(B.106) now Enschede Airport Twente
RAF Volkel	Netherlands				(B.80) now Volkel Air Base
RAF Medan	(Dutch East Indies) Netherlands East Indies				Now Soewondo Air Force Base
RAF Kemajoran	(Dutch East Indies) Netherlands East Indies			1985	Old Kemayoran Airport
RAFU Goose Bay	Newfoundland		1941	1949	now CFB Goose Bay, see Canada (country)
RAF Apapa	British Nigeria		1941	1945	
RAF Ikeja	British Nigeria				now Murtala Muhammed International Airport
RAF Kano	British Nigeria				now Mallam Aminu Kano International Airport
RAF Maiduguri	British Nigeria				Now Maiduguri International Airport
RAF Masirah	Oman		1942	31 March 1977	Largest RAF station in Oman
RAF Ras Al Hadd	Oman				
RAF Salalah	Oman		1943	1977	Route station for refuelling of aircraft in transit, now Salalah International Airport
RAF Aqir	Mandatory Palestine		1941	1947	now Tel Nof Israeli Air Force Base
RAF Beit Daras	Mandatory Palestine				also known as Kiryat Gat (Kiriat-Gat) & El Faluja.
RAF Ein Shemer	Mandatory Palestine		1942	1948	now Ein Shemer Airfield
RAF Gaza	Mandatory Palestine				
RAF Haifa	Mandatory Palestine				now Haifa Airport
RAF Hadera	Mandatory Palestine				
RAF Lydda	Mandatory Palestine				now Ben Gurion International Airport
RAF Megiddo	Mandatory Palestine				now Megiddo Airport
RAF Machanaim	Mandatory Palestine				now Rosh Pina Airport
RAF Muqeible	Mandatory Palestine				See Muqeible Airfield
RAF Petah Tiqva	Mandatory Palestine				
RAF Qastina	Mandatory Palestine				Now Hatzor Israeli Air Force Base
RAF Ramat David	Mandatory Palestine				now Ramat David Israeli Air Force Base
RAF Ramleh	Mandatory Palestine				
RAF St Jean	Mandatory Palestine				
RAF Al Udeid	Qatar				Co-located at Qatar Emiri Air Force base Al Udeid Air Base
RAF Seychelles	Seychelles				
RAF Hastings	Sierra Leone				
RAF Jui	Sierra Leone				
RAF Waterloo	Sierra Leone				
RAF Amoy Quee	Singapore				Now Singapore Armed Forces Amoy Quee Camp (Seletar)
RAF Changi	Singapore		1946	1971	now Changi Air Base and Singapore Changi Airport
RAF Chia Keng	Singapore			1971	A GCHQ radio receiving station and a satellite station (closed down in 1971) affiliated to RAF Changi
RAF Gombak	Singapore				An RAF radar station affiliated to RAF Tengah
RAF Jurong	Singapore			1971	A GCHQ radio receiving station and a satellite station (closed down in 1971) affiliated to RAF Tengah
RAF Kallang	Singapore			1955	Old Kallang Airport
RAF Seletar	Singapore		1930	1971	now Seletar Airport
RAF Sembawang	Singapore				Now Sembawang Air Base, also known as HMS Simbang in the Royal Navy Fleet Air Arm service
RAF Tengah	Singapore		1939	1971	Now Tengah Air Base
RAF Heany	Southern Rhodesia				
RAF Kumalo	Southern Rhodesia				
RAF Thornhill	Southern Rhodesia				Now Gweru-Thornhill Air Base, Zimbabwe
RAF El Gedida	Sudan				Also known as RAF Wadi Halfa, now Wadi Halfa Airport
RAF Gordon's Tree; RAF Khartoum	Sudan				now Khartoum International Airport
RAF Port Sudan	Sudan				
RAF Summit	Sudan				
RAF Wadi Saidna	Sudan				
RAF Dar-es-Salaam	Tanganyika		1918 1932	1918 1951	
RAF Pingtung	Taiwan		1950	1991	now Pingtung Airport
RAF Bangkok	Thailand		1945	1946	now Don Mueang International Airport
RAF Amman	(Jordan) Transjordan				Now Amman Civil Airport
RAF Mafraq	(Jordan) Transjordan				
Souk-el-Arba	Tunisia		1942		
Souk-el-Khemis	Tunisia		1943		Made up of several dispersals, code-named after London railway stations (Paddington, Victoria, Marylebone, Waterloo, Euston and Kings Cross known)
RAF Sharjah	United Arab Emirates		1932	1971	Now Sharjah International Airport
RAF Saigon	Vietnam				Now Tan Son Nhut Air Base

== Overseas Royal Flying Corps (WWI) and British Commonwealth Air Training Plan (WWII) airfields ==
Station	Country	Notes
Long Branch Aerodrome – Mississauga, Ontario	Canada	World War I training airfield 1917–1919; industrial land now a vacant brownfield
Leaside Aerodrome – Toronto	Canada	World War I training airfield 1918–1919; later used by Toronto Flying Club and now industrial area
Armour Heights Field – Toronto	Canada	World War I training airfield 1917–1919; now residential neighbourhood
Camp Taliaferro – Fort Worth, Texas	United States	World War I training airfield 1917–1918
Malton Airport – Mississauga	Canada	World War II British Commonwealth Air Training Plan facility (No. 1 Elementary Service Flying School) 1940–1942; now Toronto-Pearson International Airport
Mount Hope Airport – Hamilton, Ontario	Canada	World War II British Commonwealth Air Training Plan facility (No.10 Elementary Flying Training School and No.33 Air Navigation School) 1940–1945; now Hamilton International Airport
CFB Greenwood – Greenwood, Nova Scotia	Canada	British Commonwealth Air Training Plan RAF Station Greenwood built 1940–1942 and shared with RCAF 1942–1944; transferred to RCAF July 1944
CFB Winnipeg – Winnipeg, Manitoba	Canada	British Commonwealth Air Training Plan as RCAF Winnipeg during WWII
CFB Borden – Borden, Ontario	Canada	British Commonwealth Air Training Plan airfield during WWII and No. 1 Service Flying Training School (SFTS) (until 1946)
CFB Moose Jaw – Moose Jaw, Saskatchewan	Canada	British Commonwealth Air Training Plan airfield during WWII 1941–1946; home to RAF's No. 32 Service Flying Training School (SFTS) 1942–1946
CFB Trenton – Trenton, Ontario	Canada	British Commonwealth Air Training Plan airfield during WWII – RCAF Central Flying School, No. 1 Air Navigation School (to 1942), No. 1 Flying Instructor School, and No. 1 Composite Training School.
CFB North Bay – North Bay, Ontario	Canada	British Commonwealth Air Training Plan airfield during WWII

== See also ==
- Advanced Landing Ground – a type of semi-permanent bases in Kent, France, Belgium, Netherlands and occupied Germany
- Air Ministry Experimental Station
- Chain Home – radar defence system developed during the Second World War
- Class A airfield – airfields constructed to Air Ministry specifications during the Second World War
- List of Battle of Britain airfields
- List of North African airfields during World War II
- List of Royal Air Force stations, current MoD and RAF stations
- List of Royal Air Force Satellite Landing Grounds
- List of V Bomber dispersal bases
