= HMS Peregrine =

HMS Peregrine is the name of two ships of the Royal Navy

- HMS Peregrine (1749), a sloop-of-war that foundered in the English Channel in 1761
- HMS Peregrine (1916), an Admiralty M-class destroyer launched in 1916 and sold in 1921.

Peregrine has also been the name of a naval shore establishment:

- HMS Peregrine (shore establishment) a Royal Navy stone frigate, the Royal Naval Air Station at Ford, West Sussex, England from 1939 to 1940, 1945 to 1948 and 1950 to 1958.
