= RAF Brackla =

RAF Brackla
- Cawdor, Highland in Scotland

Site information
- Type: Satellite station
- Owner: Air Ministry
- Operator: Royal Air Force
- Controlled by: RAF Flying Training Command

Location
- Shown within Highland RAF Brackla (the United Kingdom)
- Coordinates: 57°32′31″N 3°54′36″W

Site history
- Built: 1941
- In use: 1941-1947
- Battles/wars: European theatre of World War II

Royal Air Force Brackla, commonly known as RAF Brackla, is a former Royal Air Force satellite station located in Scotland.

== History ==
The following units were here at some point:

- Relief landing ground of No. 2 Air Gunners School RAF (1944–45)
- Satellite of No. 2 Central Flying School RAF (November 1941 - January 1942)
- Relief Landing Ground of No. 14 (Pilots) Advanced Flying Unit RAF (June - September 1944)
- Satellite of No. 19 Operational Training Unit RAF (January 1942 - April 1944)
- Relief Landing Ground of No. 19 (Pilots) Advanced Flying Unit RAF (October 1942 - June 1943 & December 1943 - February 1944)
- Satellite of No. 45 Maintenance Unit RAF (February 1944 - September 1947)
- Air Crew Allocation Centre

== Current use ==
The site is now used as farmland.
