= RAF Berrow =

Former RAF station in Worcestershire, England

RAF Berrow No. 5 SLG RAF Pendock Moor
- Berrow, Worcestershire in England
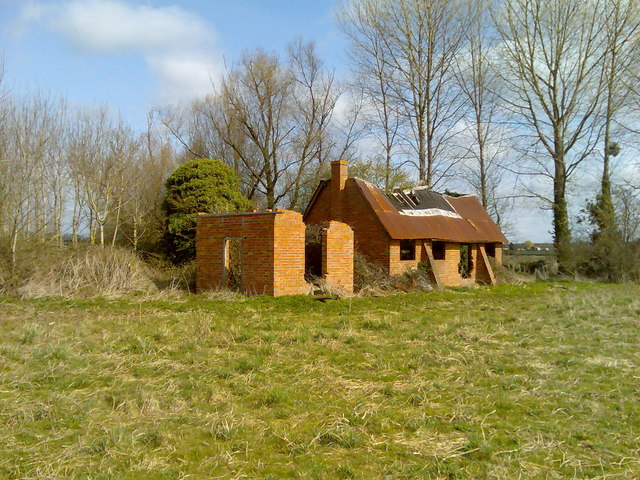
- A derelict building that once supported the landing ground

Site information
- Owner: Air Ministry
- Operator: Royal Air Force
- Controlled by: RAF Maintenance Command

Location
- Shown within Worcestershire
- Coordinates: 52°00′15″N 002°16′45″W

Site history
- Built: 1941
- In use: 1941-1945
- Battles/wars: Second World War

Royal Air Force Berrow or more simply RAF Berrow is a former Royal Air Force Satellite Landing Ground located near Berrow, Worcestershire, England.

== History ==
- No. 5 Maintenance Unit RAF.
- No. 20 Maintenance Unit RAF.
- No. 38 Maintenance Unit RAF.

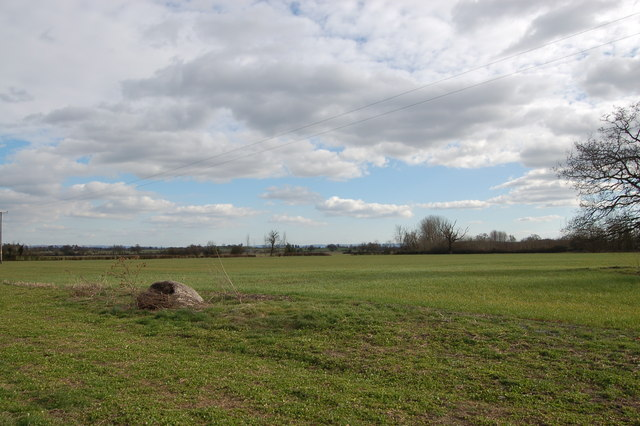
The Landing Ground

== Current use ==
The site is currently used for farming.

== See also ==
- List of Royal Air Force Satellite Landing Grounds
