= List of Royal Air Force Satellite Landing Grounds =

Ensign of the British Royal Air Force

A Satellite Landing Ground (SLG) is a type of British Royal Air Force (RAF) aviation facility that typically consists of an airfield with one or two grass runways which is designed throughout to be hidden from aerial observation by blending into forests and other natural features to hide the presence of aircraft and associated buildings. The landing grounds were mainly used by RAF Maintenance Units (MU) which used the areas to disperse aircraft to reduce the likelihood of attacks from the air. Some improvements and upgrades to aircraft were performed at these sites but overall it was kept to a minimum. Some support buildings came about by using requisitioned buildings on the land.

A satellite station is not the same as a Satellite Landing Ground.

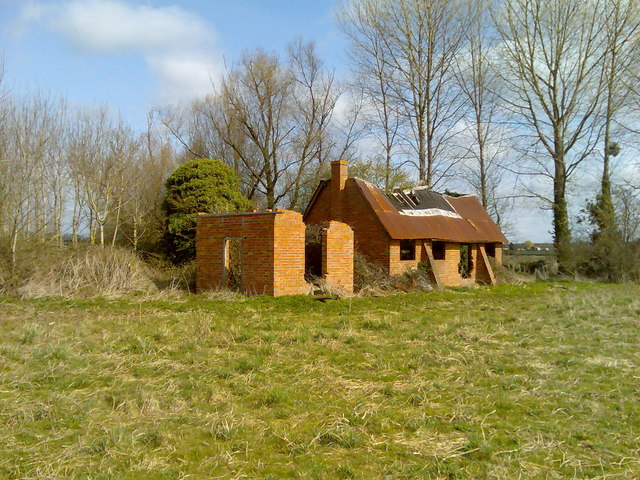
The former No. 5 SLG Berrow

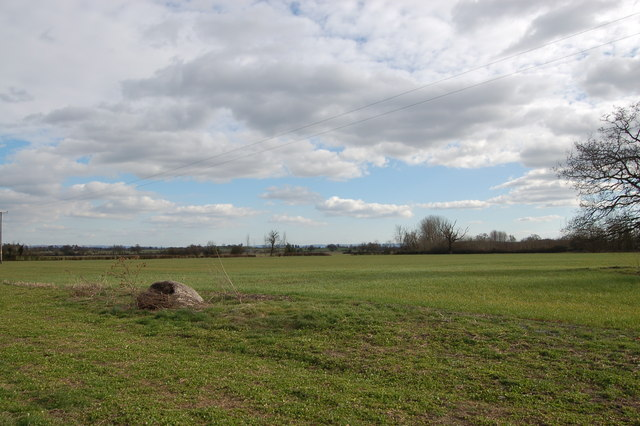
Open land on the former site of No. 5 SLG Berrow

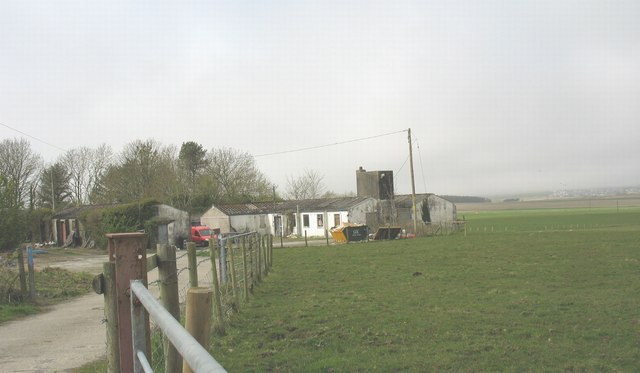
Site 1 of the former No. 15 SLG Bodorgan

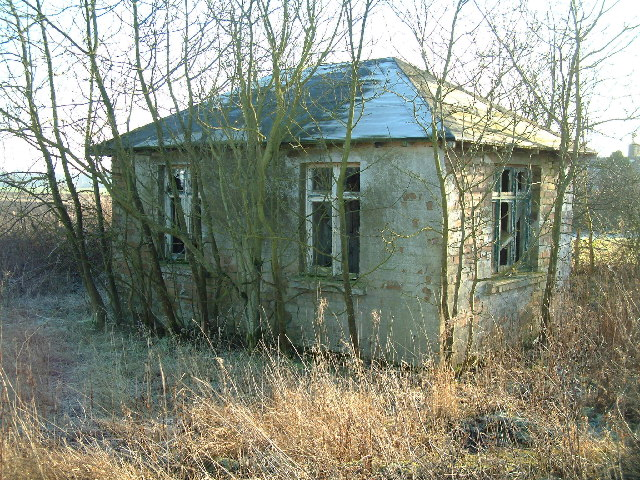
The Watch Office at the former No. 26 SLG Stravithie

== Satellite Landing Grounds ==
Number	Name	Location	County	Dates when used as a SLG	Units
No. 1 SLG	RAF Slade Farm	51°53′48″N 001°15′46″W	Oxfordshire	1 December 1940 – 10 January 1946	Used by No. 39 MU RAF Colerne
No. 2 SLG	RAF Starveall Farm	51°51′18″N 001°20′42″W	Oxfordshire	14 June 1941 – 29 September 1945.	Satellite to No. 39 MU RAF Colerne
No. 3 SLG	RAF Middle Farm	52°00′01″N 001°05′00″W	Oxfordshire	1 April 1941 – 10 January 1946	Used by 8 MU RAF Little Rissington
No. 4 SLG	RAF Rudbaxton	51°53′00″N 004°56′00″W	Pembrokeshire	1941–1943	Used by 38 MU
No. 5 SLG	RAF Berrow	52°00′15″N 002°16′45″W	Worcestershire	1941–1945	No. 5 Maintenance Unit RAF from RAF Kemble between March 1941 and late 1941. No. 20 Maintenance Unit RAF from RAF Aston Down between 1941 and August 1942.
No. 6 SLG	RAF St Brides	51°26′00″N 003°35′00″W	Glamorgan	1941–September 1945	No. 19 Maintenance Unit RAF from RAF St Athan between 15 December 1940 and July 1945.
No. 7 SLG	RAF Chepstow	51°39′13″N 002°41′19″W	Monmouthshire	3 May 1941–December 1944	No. 19 Maintenance Unit RAF from RAF St Athan from 13 May 1941 and 21 February 1942. No. 38 Maintenance Unit RAF from RAF Llandow from 21 February 1942.
No. 8 SLG	RAF Hutton in the Forest	54°34′00″N 002°49′00″W	Cumberland	June 1941–August 1945	No. 22 Maintenance Unit RAF from RAF Silloth
No. 9 SLG	RAF Hornby Hall	54°39′25″N 002°39′50″W	Cumberland	March 1941–July 1945	No. 18 Maintenance Unit RAF from RAF Dumfries between July 1940 and September 1940. No. 22 Maintenance Unit RAF from RAF Silloth. No. 12 Maintenance Unit RAF from RAF Kirkbride.
No. 10 SLG	RAF Wath Head	54°49′04″N 003°06′40″W	Cumberland	1941–1 December 1945	No. 12 Maintenance Unit RAF from RAF Kirkbride between early 1941 and 12 January 1944. No. 18 Maintenance Unit RAF from RAF Dumfries between 12 January 1944 and September 1945.
No. 11 SLG	RAF Low Eldrig	54°49′00″N 004°58′00″W	Wigtownshire	1 July 1941–September 1942	No. 18 Maintenance Unit RAF from RAF Dumfries.
No. 12 SLG	RAF Beechwood Park	51°49′23″N 000°29′04″W	Hertfordshire	1943–March 1946	No. 15 Maintenance Unit RAF from RAF Wroughton from mid 1943.
No. 13 SLG	RAF Tatton Park	53°19′47″N 002°22′32″W	Cheshire	August 1941–May 1943	No. 48 Maintenance Unit RAF from RAF Hawarden; No. 51 Maintenance Unit RAF from RAF Lichfield.
No. 14 SLG	RAF Overley Park	51°44′00″N 002°01′00″W	Gloucestershire	1941–1944	For No. 20 MU until 1942, used by 10 MU in 1944.
No. 15 SLG	RAF Bodorgan	53°11′06″N 004°25′45″W	Gwynedd	1940–1944	For No. 48 MU
No. 16 SLG	RAF Ballywalter	54°33′08″N 005°29′07″W	Down	1941–1945	For No. 23 MU
No. 17 SLG	RAF Maydown	55°02′00″N 007°14′23″W	Londonderry	1941–1941	Used by 23 MU, developed into a full size airfield.
No. 18 SLG	RAF St Angelo	54°24′56″N 007°39′05″W	Fermanagh	April 1941–September 1941	Used by 23 MU RAF Aldergrove but not used. Later became a fighter sector station.
No. 19 SLG	RAF Murlough	54°15′00″N 005°54′00″W	Down	1941–1945	Used by No. 23 MU
No. 20 SLG	RAF Langford Lodge	54°37′02″N 006°18′11″W	Antrim	1941–1942	Used by No. 23 Maintenance Unit RAF from RAF Aldergrove. developed in a full size airfield.
No. 21 SLG	RAF Ollerton	52°49′59″N 002°30′27″W	Shropshire	1941–1942	Used by 29 MU, 37 MU and 27 MU from RAF Shawbury. Transferred to the Navy and renamed Hinstock/HMS Godwit.
No. 22 SLG	RAF Barnsley Park	51°46′00″N 001°53′23″W	Gloucestershire	1941–1945	Used by 6 MU then 5 MU
No. 23 SLG	RAF Down Farm	51°35′00″N 002°15′00″W	Gloucestershire	1941–1946	Used by 10 MU
No. 24 SLG	RAF Methven	56°24′39″N 003°32′05″W	Perthshire	1941–1944	Used by 44 MU
No. 25 SLG	RAF Findo Gask	56°22′29″N 003°36′33″W	Perthshire	1941–1942	No. 44 Maintenance Unit RAF from RAF Edzell. Developed into a full size airfield.
No. 26 SLG	RAF Stravithie	56°18′00″N 002°45′00″W	Fife	1941–1942	No. 44 Maintenance Unit RAF from RAF Edzell.
No. 27 SLG	RAF Lennoxlove	55°55′59″N 002°45′08″W	East Lothian	1941–1946	No. 18 Maintenance Unit RAF from RAF Dumfries.
No. 28 SLG	RAF Barton Abbey	51°55′13″N 001°20′03″W	Oxfordshire	1943–1945	No. 39 Maintenance Unit RAF from RAF Colerne until March 1943. No. 6 Maintenance Unit RAF from RAF Brize Norton from 1943.
No. 29 SLG	RAF Hodnet	52°50′27″N 002°34′28″W	Shropshire	1941–1945	Used by 24 MU, 37 MU, 51 MU and 27 MU from RAF Shawbury
No. 30 SLG	RAF Brockton	52°37′00″N 002°25′00″W	Shropshire	1941–1945	Used by 9 MU
No. 31 SLG	RAF Everleigh	51°18′00″N 001°44′00″W	Wiltshire	1941–1945	Used by 15 MU and 33 MU from RAF Lyneham from September 1942.
No. 32 SLG	RAF Hoar Cross	52°47′40″N 001°49′23″W	Staffordshire	1941–1945	Used by 51 MU
No. 33 SLG	RAF Weston Park	52°41′14″N 002°17′12″W	Shropshire	1941–1945	No. 27 Maintenance Unit RAF from RAF Shawbury, transferred to the Royal Navy.
No. 34 SLG	RAF Woburn Park	51°59′19″N 000°36′01″W	Bedfordshire	1941–1947	Used by 6 MU and 8 MU
No. 35 SLG	RAF Blidworth	53°06′21″N 001°06′51″W	Nottinghamshire	1941–1942	Used by 51 MU
No. 36 SLG	RAF Winterseugh	55°01′00″N 003°19′00″W	Dumfriesshire	1941–1942	Used by 18 MU
No. 37 SLG	RAF Hardwick Park	53°10′18″N 001°18′07″W	Derbyshire	1941–1943	Used by 27 MU and 51 MU
No. 38 SLG	RAF Grove Park	53°18′42″N 000°53′57″W	Nottinghamshire	1942–1945	Used by 51 MU and 27 MU
No. 39 SLG	RAF Brayton Park	54°46′26″N 003°18′04″W	Cumberland	1941–1946	Used by 12 MU
No. 40 SLG	RAF Dornoch	57°52′20″N 004°01′35″W	Ross & Cromarty	1941–1945	Used by 45 MU
No. 41 SLG	RAF Kirkton	57°57′23″N 004°01′51″W	Sutherland	1941–1945	No. 45 Maintenance Unit RAF from RAF.
No. 42 SLG	RAF Black Isle	57°37′37″N 004°09′37″W	Ross & Cromarty	1941–1945	Also known as Black Stand Used by 46 MU
No. 43 SLG	RAF Leanach	57°29′00″N 004°02′00″W	Invernessshire	1941–1946	Used by 46 MU
No. 44 SLG	RAF Bush Barn	51°39′42″N 001°29′03″W	Oxfordshire	1941–1943	Used by 5 MU, later used by Royal Navy
No. 45 SLG	RAF Townsend	51°27′00″N 001°53′00″W	Wiltshire	1941–1943	No. 33 Maintenance Unit RAF from RAF Lyneham until September 1942; No. 15 Maintenance Unit RAF from RAF Wroughton from September 1942.
No. 46 SLG	RAF Brinklow	52°24′00″N 001°23′00″W	Warwickshire	1941–1944	Used by 29 MU
No. 47 SLG	RAF Southgrove	51°19′00″N 001°41′00″W	Wiltshire	1941	Was for 5 MU but was not used.
No. 48 SLG	RAF Teddesley Park	52°44′19″N 002°04′52″W	Staffordshire	1941–1946	Used by 27 MU
No. 49 SLG	RAF Knowsley Park	53°25′56″N 002°49′55″W	Lancashire	1941, 1942–1944	Used by 37 MU until declared unfit, later 48 MU
