= RAF Lissett =

Royal Air Force base in Yorkshire, England

RAF Lissett
- Lissett, East Riding of Yorkshire in England

Site information
- Type: Royal Air Force satellite station 43 Base substation 1943-45
- Code: LT
- Owner: Air Ministry
- Operator: Royal Air Force
- Controlled by: RAF Bomber Command * No. 4 Group RAF

Location
- Shown within East Riding of Yorkshire RAF Lissett (the United Kingdom)
- Coordinates: 54°00′19″N 000°16′23″W

Site history
- Built: 1940/43
- In use: February 1943 - 1947
- Battles/wars: European theatre of World War II

Airfield information
- Elevation: 7 metres (23 ft) AMSL
Runways
Direction	Length and surface
00/00	Concrete
00/00	Concrete
00/00	Concrete

Royal Air Force Lissett or more simply RAF Lissett is a former Royal Air Force station located 6.1 miles (9.8 km) south west of Bridlington, East Riding of Yorkshire, England.

== History ==
Originally required as satellite airfield for RAF Catfoss the land was requisitioned in 1940. Although constrained by three roads and the Gransmoor Drain the builders constructed a standard three-runway bomber airfield. It had two hangars and 36 dispersals and three concrete runways.

Lissett opened in February 1943 and No. 158 Squadron RAF arrived from RAF Rufforth to be the resident squadron on 28 February. 158 Squadron was a heavy bomber squadron equipped with the four-engined Handley Page Halifax. The squadron flew the first operational mission on the night of 11/12 March 1943 when ten aircraft were flown to Stuttgart. One aircraft failed to return. The squadron carried out operations up to the end of the war from Lissett. Apart from a few weeks in early 1944 only 158 Squadron operated out of the station, which was unusual for an RAF base. Over the course of the 2 years 158 Squadron was stationed there they completed 250 missions, suffering the loss of 144 aircraft, either destroyed in combat or in accident. In addition, 851 of the squadron's airmen were lost in the war.

In May 1945 with the war at an end the squadron re-equipped with transport aircraft and was transferred to RAF Transport Command. The squadron flew early-war four engine Short Stirling bombers before departing to RAF Stradishall in August 1945. With the departure of 158 Squadron the station was relegated to a care and maintenance status but by the end of the year the airfield was abandoned and the technical areas used for storage.

=== Based units ===
Unit	Aircraft	Variant	From	To	To	Notes
No. 158 Squadron RAF	Handley Page Halifax; Short Stirling	II/III/VI; V	28 February 1943	17 August 1945	Stradishall	Four-engined heavy bombers
No. 1484 Flight RAF	Boulton Paul Defiant; Armstrong Whitworth Whitley; Miles Martinet	I	1944	1944		January and February 1944, target towing and gunnery training
No. 14 Maintenance Unit	N/A		1945	1947	Elvington	Sub site
No. 91 Maintenance Unit	N/A		1945	1947	Acaster Malbis	Sub site

== Current use ==
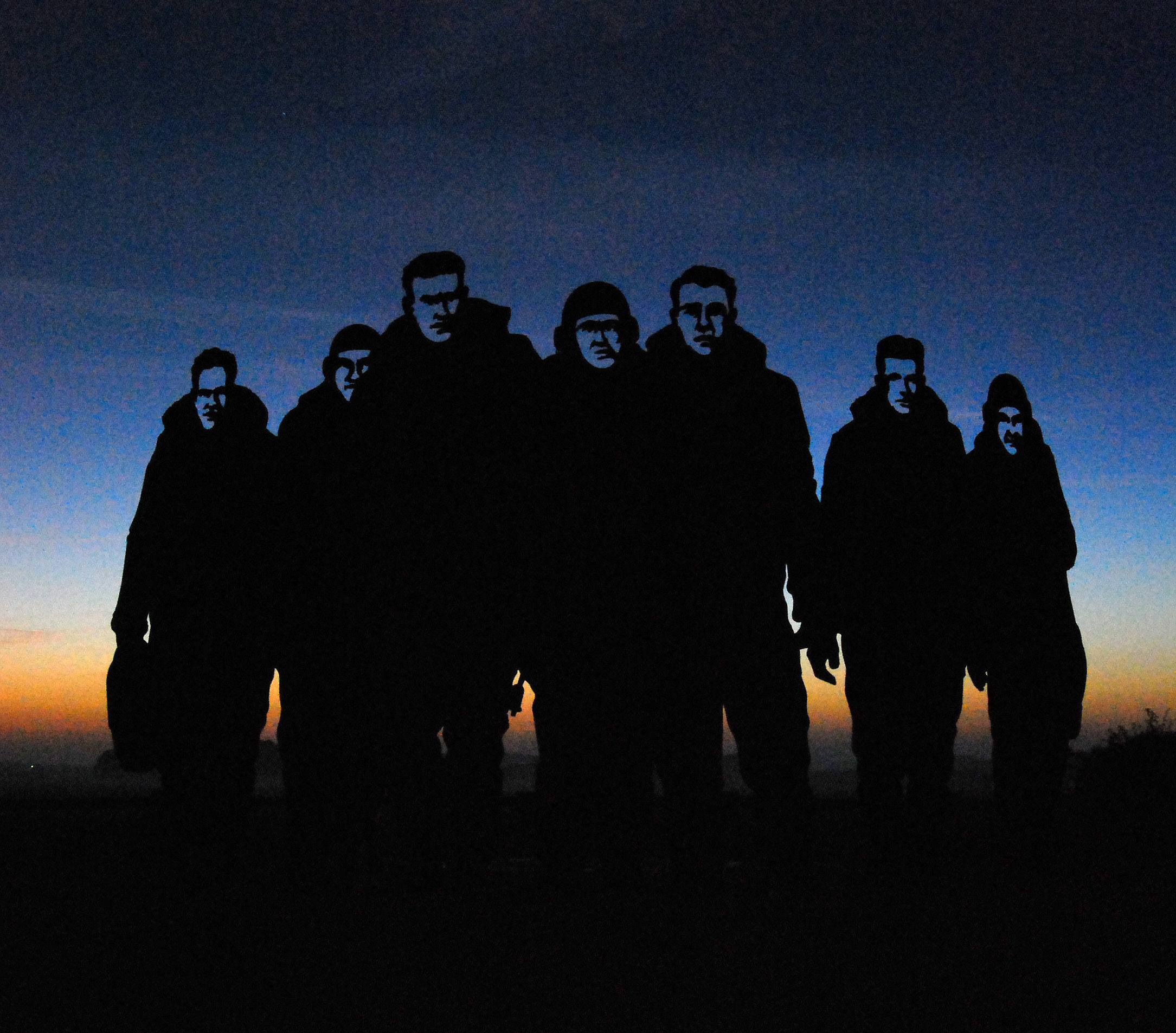
RAF Lissett Memorial at dusk

In December 2008 a wind farm housing 12 Nordex N90 turbines. each standing 100 metres (330 ft) high was constructed on the western end of the airfield. One turbine commemorates six ground crew killed in an accident at the airfield, and the remainder are named after bombers which were based there.

A memorial metal sculpture to 158 Squadron in the form of seven airmen representing the typical crew of a Halifax bomber, was erected on the base and dedicated to the memory of the 851 airmen who did not return from operations at the airfield. The monument is situated on the edge of the old airfield site on Gransmoor Road, Lissett. The memorial was designed by Peter W. Naylor and received the 2010 Marsh Award for Excellence in Public Sculpture.
