= List of Royal Air Force Maintenance units =

Ensign of the Royal Air Force

The following is a list of Royal Air Force Maintenance Units (MU). The majority of MUs were previously Equipment Depots (ED), Storage Depots (SD) and Aircraft Storage Units (ASU)s.

== No. 1 MU – No. 100 MU ==
Name	Airfields used	Equipment serviced	Notes
No. 1 MU	RAF Kidbrooke between 9 April 1938 and 15 February 1947.	Repair Depot	
No. 1 Heavy Glider MU	RAF Netheravon between May 1943 and June 1946.	Repair Depot	
No. 2 MU	RAF Broadheath between 9 April 1938 and 15 March 1957. No. 2 Sub site at Pulham between 9 April 1938 and 12 August 1940. Sub site at Ridge Quarry, Corsham between 9 April 1938 and 31 December 1939. Satellite at RAF Bridleway Gate between 10 January 1944 and 10 May 1946. Sub site at Grange Quarry, Holywell between August 1939 and 15 March 1957. RAF Sealand between 15 March 1959 and 30 June 1969. Sub site at Ridge Quarry, Holywell between October 1959 and 30 June 1969.	Ammunition Depot (1950–59) Packing Depot (1959–??); Equipment Depot; Equipment Supply Depot (1963–69)	Disbanded to become sub site of 7 MU
No. 3 MU	RAF Milton between 9 April 1938 and 31 December 1959. Sub site at RAF Akeman Street between 9 April 1938 and January 1947. Sub site at RAF Bicester between May 1947 and 20 May 1958. Sub site at RAF Chessington between 15 April 1943 and 1 August 1945. Sub site at RAF Chilbolton between 18 October 1945 and 11 June 1948. Sub site at RAF Chipping Norton between 29 October 1945 and 3 October 1953. Sub site at RAF Croughton between 17 July 1946 and 30 June 1951. Sub site at RAF Gravesend between 17 February 1945 and 30 June 1951. Sub site at RAF Grove between 31 October 1948 and c.May 1953, 1 April 1955 and 31 December 1958. Sub site at RAF Hermitage (The Pinewood Brick & Tile Works) between November 1941 and ???? Sub site at RAF Kidlington between 31 July 1948 and 31 March 1955. Sub site at RAF Kingston Bagpuize between 8 December 1944 and 15 June 1954. Sub site at RAF Membury between ???? and 31 March 1955; Sub site at RAF West Ruislip between 1 May 1947 and 30 June 1959. Sub site at RAF Sawbridgeworth between 1 December 1944 and 30 April 1947; Sub site at RAF Shellingford between May 1947 and 30 June 1948. Sub site at RAF Stanmore Park between October 1946 and 31 October 1949. Sub site at RAF Titchfield between 15 April 1945 and 2 July 1945. Sub site at RAF Titchfield between 31 December 1946 and 31 January 1947. Sub site at RAF Weston-on-the-Green between 1 October 1945 and 31 December 1947. Sub site at RAF Woodcote between 31 October 1947 and 31 October 1949. Sub site at RAF Woodcote between ???? and 31 January 1959.	Universal Equipment Department (1938–42); Aircraft Equipment Depot (1942–59)	
No. 4 MU	RAF West Ruislip between 9 April 1938 and 28 February 1957. Sub site at RAF Stanmore Park between 1 November 1939 and ???? Sub site at RAF Stanmore Park between 1 November 1949 and 28 February 1957.	Repair Depot	
No. 5 MU	RAF Kemble between 22 June 1938 and 31 March 1983. Sub site at RAF Berrow between November 1941 and September 1942; Sub site at RAF Beechwood Park between May 1941 and 17 Mar 1943; Sub site at Bush Barn between 22 September 1941 and February 1943; Sub site at RAF Barnsley Park between 19 August 1942 and September 1945; Sub site at RAF Aston Down between 30 September 1960 and 31 March 1983.	Aircraft Storage Unit (1938–63): Armstrong Whitworth Whitleys and Tiger Moths. Aircraft Supply & Servicing Depot (1963–83)	Disbanded 1983 to become USAF maintenance base, closed 1992.
No. 6 MU	RAF Brize Norton between 10 October 1938 and 31 December 1951. Sub site at RAF Barnsley Park between 1 July 1941 and 19 Aug 1942. Sub site at RAF Barton Abbey between February 1943 and February 1945. Sub site at Woburn Park between 1 July 1941 and 25 February 1943. Sub site at Woburn Park between Jan or Nov 1944 and May 1945. Sub site at RAF Watchfield between December 1940 and October 1941. Sub site at RAF Chipping Warden between 6 January 1946 and 11 December 1949. Sub site at RAF Market Harborough between 28 April 1947 and 5 October 1949.	Aircraft Storage Unit; Airspeed Horsas, Airspeed Oxfords, de Havilland Dragon Dominies. Bristol Blenheims, Handley Page Hampdens, Supermarine Spitfires and Fairey Battles.	Held German jets at some point while at Brize Norton. Transferred to USAF 1 January 1952.
No. 7 MU	RAF Quedgeley between 15 April 1939 and 15 March 1996. sub sites at : Aberporth 1940. Babdown Farm between 31 Jul 1945 and 30 Sep 1950. RAF Bibury between 1 Dec 1944 and 28 Feb 1950. Collaton Cross, Plymouth between 20 Aug and 22 Oct 1945. Enstone between 15 Jan and 28 Oct 1946. Llandaff between 26 May 1943 and 14 Apr 1947. Pucklechurch between 21 Apr and 19 Jul 1945 and 30 Nov 1946 to 10 Nov 1958. RAF Sealand between 1 Jul 1969 and Dec 1978. Staverton between 4 Jun 1945 and 11 Aug 1953. Stoke Orchard between 16 Sep 1946 and 6 Mar 1950. Titchfield between 31 Dec 1946 and 1 Feb 1947.	Universal Equipment Depot (1939–42); Aircraft Equipment Depot (1942–63); Equipment Supply Depot (1963–96); Airspeed Oxfords.	
No. 8 MU	RAF Little Rissington. between 7 Feb 1939 and 30 Jun 1957. SLG at Great Shefford; Pembridge; No. 28 Barton Abbey; No. 34 Woburn Park; Stoke Orchard; Watchfield; Worcester; Purgatory Storage Units at: Hatfield; Luton; Portsmouth; Rawcliffe Paper Mills; Long Marston; Honeybourne sub site at Staverton	Aircraft Storage Unit; Airspeed Oxfords.	
No. 9 MU	RAF Cosford between 15 March 1939 and 22 June 1956. No. 30 RAF Brockton between 1941 and unknown. No. 33 RAF Weston Park between October 1940 and Summer 1945. Temporary Dispersals at: Castle Bromwich between October 1939 and 1940; Desford	Aircraft Storage and Repair Unit (1938–39); Aircraft Storage Unit (1939–56); Armstrong Whitworth Whitleys and Tiger Moths. Supermarine Spitfires and Vickers Wellingtons at RAF Brockton. Avro Ansons and Supermarine Spitfires at RAF Cosford. Supermarine Spitfires at RAF Weston Park.	
No. 10 MU	RAF Hullavington. between 8 Jul 1938 and 31 Dec 1959. No. 23 Down Farm; No. 31 Everleigh; No. 14 Overley Park; Temporary Dispersals at: Mousehold 1940; Yatesbury 1940; Townsend between October 1940 and September 1941; Benson 1940	Aircraft Storage Unit: Airspeed Oxfords and Avro Ansons.	
No. 11 MU	RAF Chilmark. between 20 Mar 1939 and 27 Jan 1995. Sub site at Charlton Hawthorne; Sub site at Dinton, Long Newnton; Sub site at Elm Park Quarry, Hawthorn; Sub site at Groveley Woods; Sub site at Ridge Quarry, Corsham	Explosives Storage Unit; Ammunition Storage Depot; Ammunition Supply Depot	Also used by USAAF
No. 12 MU	RAF Kirkbride between 5 June 1939 and 30 June 1960. No. 39 RAF Brayton Park between 29 May 1942 and December 1945. No. 10 RAF Wath Head between early 1941 and 12 January 1944. No. 9 RAF Hornby Hall	Aircraft Storage Unit; Handley Page Hampdens, Percival Proctors, Airspeed Oxfords; Airspeed Horsas. Handley Page Halifaxes, Vickers Wellingtons, Consolidated B-24 Liberator and Vultee A-31 Vengeances.	
No. 13 MU	RAF Henlow between 1 June 1939 and 20 Jan 1948.	Aircraft Repair Depot; Miles Magisters, Airspeed Oxfords, Tiger Moths, Handley Page Halifaxs, Supermarine Spitfire, de Havilland Mosquitoes and Douglas Dakotas. but mainly Hawker Hurricanes.	
No. 14 MU	RAF Carlisle between 26 Sep 1938 and 26 Sep 1996. Sub site at Annan; Sub site at Bishopbriggs; Sub site at Catfoss; Sub site at Crosby-on-Eden; Sub site at Dumfries; Sub site at RAF Elvington; Sub site at Gibb Hill; Sub site at Grangemouth; Sub site at RAF Lissett; Sub site at Long Benton; Sub site at Usworth; Sub site at Sandysyke; Sub site at Wigtown	Universal Equipment Depot; Aircraft Equipment Depot; Equipment Storage Depot	
No. 15 MU	RAF Wroughton between 1 Apr 1940 and 31 Mar 1972. No. 31 SLG; No. 1 SLG; No. 12 SLG; Temporary dispersal at Bicester; Purgatory Storage Units at: Cowley; Coventry; Hatfield; Reading	Pool; Aircraft Storage Unit; Aircraft Supply & Servicing Depot (1963–72); Avro Ansons.	Became RNAY Wroughton
No. 16 MU	RAF Stafford between 1 December 1939 and 31 March 1999. Sub-site at Castle Bromwich; Sub-site at Folkingham; Sub-site at Foulsham; Sub-site at RAF Hixon between July 1945 and 5 November 1957. Sub-site at North Witham; Sub-site at RAF Sealand between December 1978 and June 1989. Sub-site at Tilstock	Universal Equipment Depot (1939–42); Aircraft Equipment Depot (1942–63); Equipment Storage Depot (1963–99)	disbanded 1999 to become DSDC Stafford. Closed 31 Mar 2006. Site now MoD Stafford.
No. 17 MU	Pitfour Castle, Perth, Scotland between August 1941 and August 1942; Glen Carse, Perthshire between August 1942 and September 1945	Equipment Park	Note: was to be an Ammunition Depot as part of No. 42 Group in 1939 but not formed.
No. 18 MU	RAF Tinwald Downs between 17 June 1940 and 1957. No. 9 SLG RAF Hornby Hall. No. 10 SLG RAF Wath Head between 12 January 1944 and September 1945. No. 11 SLG RAF Low Eldrig. No. 27 SLG RAF Lennoxlove. No. 36	Aircraft Storage Unit; Airspeed Oxfords. Storing and scrapping Vickers Wellingtons, and Westland Whirlwinds.	
No. 19 MU	RAF St Athan between 7 February 1939 and 1 November 1968. No. 6 SLG RAF St Brides between 15 December 1940 and July 1945. No. 7 SLG RAF Chepstow between 13 May 1941 and 21 February 1942.	Aircraft Storage Unit; Miles Magisters. Supermarine Spitfires at RAF Chepstow. Hawker Hurricanes, Bristol Beauforts and Bristol Beaufighters.	Became the Aircraft Engineering Wing at St Athan in 1968.
No. 20 MU	RAF Aston Down from October 1938 until September 1960. No. 5 SLG RAF Berrow between 1941 and August 1942. Pembridge; No. 14 SLG; Purgatory Site Unit at Whitchurch; Sub site at Abbots Bromley	Equipment Storage Unit; Aircraft Storage Unit; Avro Ansons.	Disbanded into 5 MU on 30 September 1960.
No. 21 MU	RAF Fauld between 1 June 1938 and 1966. RAF Fauld between 1967 and 1973. Sub site at RAF Abbots Bromley. RAF Tatenhill between January 1945 and 1947.	Explosives Storage Unit; MT Storage Unit; Ammunition Storage Depot; Ammunition Supply Depot (1963–66)	RAF Fauld was severely damaged in explosion 1944.
No. 22 MU	RAF Silloth between 5 June 1939 and 31 December 1960. No. 9 SLG; No. 8 SLG	Aircraft Storage Unit; Airspeed Oxfords.	
No. 23 MU	RAF Aldergrove between 1 December 1939 and April 1978. No. 16 SLG; No. 17 SLG; No. 18 SLG; No. 19 SLG; No. 20 SLG; No. 101 SLG	Aurcraft Storage Unit; Repair & Salvage Unit; MT Storage Unit; Aircraft Supply & Servicing Depot (1963–78); Airspeed Oxfords.	
No. 24 MU	RAF Tern Hill between 10 March 1938 and 15 March 1951. No. 29 SLG; No. 38 SLG RAF Stoke Heath between 1 June 1956 and 1 February 1959; Sub site at Sealand	Aircraft Repair and Maintenance Depot (1938–42); Service Repair Depot (1942–51)	Disbanded Reformed No. 30, No. 34 & No. 291 MU's.
No. 25 MU	RAF Hartlebury between 1 September 1938 and . Sub site at Cardington; Sub site at Chelveston; Sub site at Edgehill; Sub site at Halfpenny Green; Sub site at Harrington; Sub site at Madley; Sub site at Melchbourne Park; Sub site at Shobdon; Sub site at Troston; Sub site at Wythall; Satellite at RAF Horham between October 1945 and October 1948.	Universal Equipment Depot (1939–42); Aircraft Equipment Depot (1942–1963); Equipment Storage Depot (1963–1977). Armstrong Whitworth Whitleys.	
No. 26 MU	Cowley (Repair Depot).	Armstrong Whitworth Whitleys.	
No. 26 MU	RAF Cardington between 10 February 1938 and 15 April 1947	Balloon Repair; Repair Depot	
No. 27 MU	RAF Shawbury between 10 February 1938 and 1 July 1972; No. 37 SLG; No. 21 SLG; No. 29 SLG; No. 33 SLG; Temporary dispersals at: Elmdon; Ansty	Aircraft Storage Unit (1938–63); Aircraft Supply & Servicing Depot (1963–72); Blenheims, Hurricanes; Whitleys.	Dealt with many types including fighters and bombers.
No. 28 MU	RAF Harpur Hill between 15 December 1939 and 31 October 1959. Sub site at RAF Ashbourne; Sub site at Cairn Ryan; Sub site at Darley Moor; Sub site at Rowthorne Tunnel	Explosives Storage Unit; Air Ammunition Depot	Underground munitions storage and RAF Mountain Rescue Team for the Peak District at RAF Harpur Hill 1939–1960.
No. 29 MU	RAF High Ercall between 1 October 1940 and 1 March 1957. No. 48 SLG; No. 46 SLG; No. 21 SLG	Aircraft Storage Unit	
No. 30 MU	RAF Sealand between 1 August 1939 and 15 March 1951. RAf Stoke Heath between 15 March 1951 and 12 June 1956 RAF Sealand between 1 February 1959 and unknown.	Service Repair Depot; Electronics Servicing Unit; Avionics Repair de Havilland Mosquitos, Vickers Wellingtons and Avro Lancasters.	
No. 31 MU	RAF Llanberis between May 1941 and 28 March 1955. Sub site at Holywell; Sub site at Llandwrog; Sub site at Rhiwlas RAF Llandwrog between 28 March 1955 and 21 October 1956; Sub site at Cairn Ryan; Sub site at Llanberis	Ammunition Depot	
No. 32 MU	RAF St Athan between 1 July 1939 and 1 November 1968.	Service Repair Depot (1939–63); General Engineering Depot (1963–68); Miles Magisters.	In the 1960s it major serviced Blackburn Beverley and the V bomber fleet. Became Aircraft Engineering Wing.
No. 33 MU	RAF Lyneham between 6 March 1940 and 31 December 1966. No. 45 SLG; No. 2 SLG; 31 SLG; Yatesbury; Sub site at Hullavington	Aircraft Storage Unit (1940–1963); Aircraft Supply & Servicing Depot (1963–66); Bristol Blenheims and Airspeed Oxfords.	
No. 34 MU	Monkmoor Aerodrome, Shrewsbury between 1 March 1940 and 10 August 1945 RAF Montford Bridge between 10 August 1945 to 30 June 1947 Sleap between 30 June 1947 and 1 July 1948 Stoke Heath between 1 July 1948 and 12 June 1956	Salvage Centre (1940–45); Repair & Salvage Centre (1945–56); General Aircraft Hotspur and Miles Masters from RAF Shobdon.	Disbanded into No. 24 MU
No. 35 MU	RAF Heywood between 1 June 1939 and 14 April 1967; Sub site at Bircotes; Sub site at Bowlee; Sub site at Breighton; Sub site at Catterick; Sub site at Cuckney; Sub site at Goxhill; Sub site at Grimsby; Sub site at Handforth; Sub site at Holme-on-Spalding Moor; Sub site at North Killingholme; Sub site at Norton; Sub site at Riccall; Sub site at Samlesbury; Sub site at RAF Sandtoft between 27 December 1945 and 11 February 1946; Sub site at Strubby; Sub site at Waltham; Sub site at Warton	Universal Equipment Depot (1939–42); Aircraft Equipment Depot (1942–63); Equipment Supply Depot (1963–67): Tiger Moths.	
No. 36 MU	RAF Sealand between 15 October 1936 and 1 May 1940. Snodland between 8 July 1940 and 1 July 1941; Sub site at Newdigate Oaklands Park, Newdigate between 1 July 1942 and 1 February 1943; Sub site at Snodland Russ Hill, Charlwood between 1 February 1943 and 8 August 1945; Sub site at Snodland Redhill between 8 August 1945 and 31 January 1947	Packing Depot (1936–40); Tiger Moths. Explosives Storage Unit (1940–47)	Became No. 47 MU Disbanded
No. 37 MU	RAF Burtonwood between 1 April 1940 to 15 July 1942. No. 21 SLG; No. 49 SLG; No. 29 SLG RAF Burtonwood between 15 August 1946 and 1 March 1949.	Aircraft Storage Unit (1940–42); Aircraft Repair Depot (1946–49)	The unit became the RAF's centre for repair of aircraft built in the United States.
No. 38 MU	RAF Llandow between 1 April 1940 and 15 March 1957. No. 4 SLG; No. 7 SLG; No. 5 SLG; Temporary dispersals at: Haverfordwest; Weston-super-Mare; Benson	Aircraft Storage Unit	
No. 39 MU	RAF Colerne between 1 January 1940 and 1 October 1953. No. 1 SLg; No. 2 SLG; No. 28 SLG; Detachment at Whitchurch	Aircraft Storage Unit; Tiger Moths.	
No. 41 MU	RAF Lyneham between December 1939 and 6 March 1940	Aircraft Storage Unit	Became No. 33 MU
No. 41 MU	RAF Khormaksar	Hawker Hunters, Scottish Aviation Twin Pioneers, Vickers Valettas	
No. 42 MU	RAF Lichfield between December 1939 and 6 March 1940.	Aircraft Storage Unit	Became No. 51 MU
No. 43 MU	RAF Cardiff between 3 February 1940 and 6 March 1940		Became No. 52 MU
No. 44 MU	RAF Edzell between 1 August 1940 and 20 April 1949; No. 26 SLG; No. 24 SLG; No. 25 SLG; Temporary dispersal at Perth; Satellite at Montrose; Satellite at Stracathro; Satellite at Findo Gask; Satellite at RAF Kinnell between July 1945 and late 1945. Satellite at Elgin RAF Edzell between 6 June 1951 and 31 July 1956	Aircraft Storage Unit	
No. 45 MU	RAF Kinloss between 6 April 1940 and 15 January 1957. No. 40 SLG; No. 41 SLG; No. 42 SLG; No. 102 Storage Sub-Site Brackla; No. 105 Storage Sub-Site Eglin	Aircraft Storage Unit; Armstrong Whitworth Whitleys, Vickers Wellingtons, Handley Page Halifaxes and Supermarine Spitfires.	The unit mainly dealt with Bombers but later on dealt with Fighters.
No. 46 MU	RAF Lossiemouth between 15 April 1940 and 15 February 1947. No. 42 SLG; No. 43 SLG; No. 40 SLG; No. 105 Storage Sub-Site Elgin	Aircraft Storage Unit; Vickers Wellingtons.	
No. 47 MU	RAF Sealand between 1 May 1940 and 15 March 1951. RAF Hawarden between 15 March 1951 and 15 March 1959	Packing and Storage Depot	
No. 48 MU	RAF Hawarden between 1 September 1939 and until 1 July 1957. No. 15 SLG; No. 13 SLG RAF Tatton Park between August 1941 and May 1943. No. 49 SLG; No. 100 SLG; Temporary dispersals at: Ansty; Elmdon; Purgatory Storage Unit at Brough	Aircraft Storage Unit; Percival Proctors, Airspeed Oxfords and Avro Ansons. Westland Lysanders and Vickers Wellingtons stored at Tatton Park.	
No. 49 MU	RAF Henlow from October 1939 until November 1939. RAF Faygate from November 1939 until February 1946. Detachment at Gatwick; Detachment at Ringwood; Detachment at Tangmere; Detachment at Iblsey; Detachment at Odiham; RAF Lasham from 12 February 1946 until 4 May 1948. RAF Colerne between 4 May 1948 and 1 March 1962. Detachment at Hornchurch Sealand from September 1968	Repair & Salvage; Tiger Moths. Packing Unit	49 Maintenance Unit was formerly known as 1 Salvage Centre, formed at Henlow September 1939; became 49 Maintenance Unit, October 1939; moved to Faygate November 1939; moved to Lasham February 1946. Storage
No. 50 MU	Cowley, Oxford from 4 October 1940 until 18 December 1943. Det Taunton; Tavistock; Truro; Sub site at Wylye Holloway, Cowley, Oxford between 18 December 1943 and 30 September 1945	Repair & Salvage; Tiger Moths.	2 Salvage Centre, formed at Cowley, Oxford, September 1939; became 50 Maintenance Unit October 1939; Transported damaged aircraft and parts to the CRU and to firms participating in the Civilian Repair Organisation, and also to collect non-repairable parts and scrap for materials reclamation at MPRD
No. 51 MU	RAF Lichfield between 6 March 1940 and 1 July 1954. RAF Tatton Park between August 1941 and May 1943.	Airspeed Oxfords, Avro Ansons and Tiger Moths. Westland Lysanders and Vickers Wellingtons stored at Tatton Park.	Storage
No. 52 MU	RAF Cardiff between 6 March 1940 and 31 October 1945. RAF Pengam Moors February 1940 until October 1945.	Packing Depot	The unit dismantled, packied and despatched fighter aircraft to overseas locations sometimes using Cardiff Docks.
No. 53 MU	RAF Bungay between July 1945 and 1955. RAF Thorpe Abbotts between 12 August 1940 and 1 February 1958.	Ammunition	Bomb Storage.
No. 54 MU	RAF Cambridge between October 1939 and March 1945. RAF Newmarket between 1 March 1945 and 31 January 1948.	Unknown	3 Salvage Centre, formed at Henlow September 1939; moved to Cambridge September 1939; became 54 Maintenance Unit October 1939; moved to Newmarket March 1945 Storage
No. 55 MU	Ballymenoch House, Holywood, Co. Down from October 1940 until September 1943.	Unknown	Disbanded
No. 56 MU	RAF Inverness (Longman) from 1942.	Unknown	Storage
No. 57 MU	RAF Wig Bay.	Tiger Moths.	Aircraft Storage Unit
No. 58 MU	RAF Newark from October 1939 until 15 November 1945. RAF Skellingthorpe from 15 November 1945 until 1 April 1947. RAF Newton from 1 April 1947 until 15 May 1950. RAF Cosford from late 1950 until December 1952. RAF Honington from 15 May 1950 until late 1950, and December 1952 until 20 July 1954. RAF Sutton Bridge from 20 July 1954 until 1 November 1957.	Aircraft Storage; Rolls-Royce Derwent Engine Field Servicing (DFS); Salvage and Recovery (S&R)	58 Maintenance Unit was formerly known as 4 Salvage Centre, formed RAF Newark (satellite of RAF Waddington) August 1938; became 58 Maintenance Unit, October 1939; moved to RAF Skellingthorpe November 1945. At RAF Skellingthorpe: Salvaged crashed aircraft were stored at the base. At RAF Sutton Bridge, unit sections included: Rolls-Royce Derwent Engine Field Servicing (DFS), Salvage and Recovery (S&R), included dismantling Avro Lancaster Bombers.
No. 59 MU	Newland near Coleford, Gloucestershire from May 1941 until December 1945.	Unknown	59 Maintenance Unit, formed at Newland, near Coleford, Gloucestershire May 1941; includes 59 Maintenance (Satellite) Unit, Rhoose, Cardiff.
No. 60 MU	RAF Tollerton from October 1939 until 14 February 1940. RAF Shipton from 15 February 1940 until November 1945. RAF Rufforth November 1945 until November 1974. RAF Dishforth between 1 March 1962 and 2 February 1966. RAF Leconfield From 2 February 1966 until 30 November 1976.	Storage	5 Salvage Centre, formed at Tollerton September 1939; later became 60 Maintenance Unit; moved to Shipton-by-Beningborough February 1940; moved to Rufforth November 1945. Storage
No. 61 MU	RAF Handforth; RAF Cranage between 20 September 1945 and 19 March 1954	Aircraft Equipment Depot (Equipment Storage Depot)	
No. 62 MU	RAF Handforth. RAF Helensburgh between 28 August 1945 and 30 November 1947.	Storage	Storage
No. 63 MU	RAF Carluke From October 1949 until May 1946. RAF Woolsington from May 1946.	Storage	6 Salvage Centre, formed at Sealand; moved to Carluke September 1939; became 63 Maintenance Unit in October 1939; moved to Woolsington May 1946. Storage
No. 64 MU	Ruslip from November 1941 until July 1942. RAF Hatfield from July 1942 until February 1946.	Unknown	64 Maintenance Unit, formed at Ruislip November 1941; includes Sub-Units at Hatfield, Newdigate, Warley near Brentwood, Black Park near Slough; HQ moved to Hatfield July 1942; disbanded February 1946.
No. 65 MU	RAF Blaby	Storage	Storage
No. 66 MU	Cuckney from March 1942 until December 1945.	Unknown	
No. 67 MU	Marshalsea's Garage in Wellington Road Taunton	Storage	Covered the south-west
No. 68 MU	RAF Church Lawford between 1 December 1954 and 27 March 1955. RAF Hindley Green; RAF Wellesbourne Mountford between 27 March 1955 and 30 November 1956.	Storage	Storage
No. 69 MU	RAF Sandysike	Secondary Aircraft Equipment Depot site for 14 MU	
No. 70 MU	RAF Woodcote.	Storage	Storage
No. 71 MU	RAF Bicester. Sub site at RAF Gaydon between 1 December 1971 and 31 October 1974. RAF West Ruislip. Sub site at Slough.	Storage	Storage
No. 72 MU	Salcey Forest, Roade, near Northampton, from March 1942	Unknown	
No. 73 MU	Okehampton from December 1942 until October 1945.	Unknown	Disbanded
No. 74 MU	Bough Beech, near Edenbridge, from February 1942 until September 1945.	Unknown	Disbanded
No. 75 MU	RAF Wilmslow	Storage	Covered Lancashire and Cheshire.
No. 76 MU	RAF Wroughton	Storage	Storage
No. 77 MU	Redcastle, near Killearnan, Ross-shire from June 1941 until December 1945.	Unknown	Disbanded
No. 78 MU	Bynea, South Wales from late 1940; Pencoed Tinplate Works	Unknown	Civilian manned unit
No. 79 MU	Lentran House, Inverness from July 1941 until September 1945.	Unknown	Disbanded
No. 80 MU	RAF Acaster Malbis between 21 January 1947 and 12 December 1947.	Storage	Storage
No. 81 MU	Bowes Moor from December 1941 until October 1947.	Chemical warfare agents (CWA)	Disbanded
No. 82 MU	RAF Lichfield between 4 April 1941 and 15 November 1945.	Storage	Storage
No. 83 MU	RAF Woolsington, Newcastle from 26 July 1940	Storage	Storage
No. 84 MU	RAF Calshot between 1 December 1941 and 15 March 1946.	Storage	Storage
No. 85 MU	RAF Felixstowe from October 1941 until June 1946.	Unknown	Disbanded
No. 86 MU	RAF Manston between 1944 and 31 August 1945. Sundridge Aerodrome	Storage	Storage
No. 87 MU	RAF York from est. January 1942 until December 1945.	Unknown	Disbanded
No. 88 MU	Meikle Ferry, near Tain from January 1942 until February 1946.	Unknown	Disbanded
No. 89 MU	Barton Mills from October 1942 until April 1946.	Unknown	Disbanded
No. 90 MU	RAF Warton between Unknown and 1958.	Barrack and Clothing Storage Unit	
No. 91 MU	RAF Riccall. RAF Acaster Malbis between 1944 and 15 December 1947 then between 15 December 1947 and 31 March 1948 as a sub site. RAF Lissett 1945–1947. Sub site at RAF Marston Moor between 31 Jan 1949 and 15 September 1953. Sub site at RAF Melbourne between 24 January 1949 and 18 September 1954. Sub site at RAF Middleton St. George between 1950 and 31 Mar 1957.	Ammunition	Bomb Storage
No. 92 MU	Brafferton between 1939 and 1947. RAF Wickenby between 1952 and 1956. RAF Faldingworth between 1957 and 1972. RAF Barnham.	Blue Danube	Nuclear Weapons Storage.
No. 93 MU	RAF Wickenby between 1949 and 1952. RAF Faldingworth; RAF Acaster Malbis between 1 April 1957 and 1 August 1957.	Ammunition	Stored ordnance on the runways
No. 94 MU	RAF Great Ashfield; Sub site at RAF Bungay between 1955 and 1962. sub site at RAF Rackheath between 27 January 1948 and 16 August 1954. RAF Honington between 1950 and 1956. RAF Ridgewell between 10 September 1946 and 31 March 1957.	Ammunition	Bomb Storage.
No. 95 MU	RAF Ridgewell as a sub site between 10 July 1945 and 27 January 1948. RAF Ridgewell between 1 October 1948 and 25 March 1955. Sub site at RAF Nuthampstead between 10 July 1945 and 27 January 1948; Sub site at RAF Nuthampstead between 1 October 1949 and 30 October 1954.	Unknown	Unknown
No. 96 MU	RAF Kidlington between unknown and 1951.	Unknown	Unknown
No. 97 MU	Staple Station, Kent (20 May 1940 - 10 July 1940); RAF Faldingworth between 1957 and 1972.	Ammunition; Blue Danube	No 7 Air Ammunition Park in Sept 1938 Mobilisation Plans, replaced by 36 MU Snodland; Nuclear Weapons Storage.
No. 98 MU	Mawcarse, Kinross-shire, from May 1940 until June 1946. Fordoun, Kincardine-shire from June 1946 until August 1947.	Unknown	Disbanded
No. 99 MU	RAF Lichfield between 1 February 1954 and 1 March 1957. RAF High Ercall between 1 March 1957 and 8 June 1962.	Unknown	Unknown
No. 100 MU	RAF South Witham between 1942 and 1949.		

== No. 101 MU – No. 200 MU ==
Name	Airfields used	Equipment serviced	Notes
No. 101 MU	RAF Tura between 1937 and 1947. RAF Helwan until 1941.		
No. 102 MU	RAF Aboukir between 1 November 1938 and 1 January 1939. RAF Abu Sueir between 1 January 1939 and 1 February 1942. RAF Amriya between 1 July 1943 and 31 August 1946. RAF Benina during 1948. RAF Berka during 1948.		
No. 103 MU	RAF Aboukir between 12 November 1939 and 30 October 1946. RAF Akrotiri between 15 November 1955 and 31 January 1975.		
No. 104 MU	Geraif West, Khartoum (Sudan) from May 1941 until October 1943; Aleppo (Syria) from November 1943 until March 1944; Muqeibila (Palestine) from March 1944 until October 1945; Aqir from October 1945 until November 1945 RAF Habbaniya from 1954 to 1956		
No. 105 MU	Addis Ababa (Ethiopia); Nairobi (Kenya) from September 1941 until July 1942; Thika from July 1942 until May 1947		
No. 106 MU	El Khanka, August 1941		
No. 107 MU	RAF Kasfareet.	Operated a maintenance, repair, and flight test center.	Was formed at RAF Kasfareet (formerly known as RAF Geneifa).
No. 108 MU	LG222 Kilo 17 [Cairo to Fayoum Road] Egypt from August 1941 until December 1943; El Firdan from December 1943 until December 1945	Unknown	Disbanded
No. 109 MU	RAF Abu Sueir between 26 November 1941 and 13 February 1942; RAF Abu Sueir between 22 February 1943 and unknown. RAF Fayid during July 1946.		
No. 110 MU	Fort St Lucien, Malta from May 1943 until disbanded November 1943; Re-formed Brindisi, Italy from December 1943 until December 1944 Unit was still based in Malta at Hal Far March 1945 and at Luqa in March 1947 based on service records of close relative		
No. 111 MU	RAF Tura.		Used to be part of No. 101 MU
No. 112 MU	El Agrud (later renamed Wadi Ysara), Egypt, June 1942		
No. 113 MU			Formed at Hurghada, Egypt on 1 November 1941. RAF Nicosia between 1 January 1955 and 30 April 1964.
No. 114 MU	Sudan, Libya, Italy, Aden after 1945	Equipment Supply Depot	Index card for 114 MU, National Archives, indicates formed at Wadi Seidna, [Anglo-Egyptian Sudan, not Egypt], April 1942; [disbanded February 1943]; re-formed Zavia (Libya) March 1943; moved to Naples (Italy) December 1943. RAFweb indicates different dates for 114 MU's stay at Wadi Seidna: between 26 December 1941 and 20 February 1943. The unit was later located at Steamer Point; probably indicates RAF Khormaksar, Aden after the Second World War.
No. 115 MU	RAF Habbaniya between 1 March 1945 and 1 April 1958.		
No. 116 MU	RAF Takoradi between 19 October 1941 and 30 August 1945.		
No. 117 MU	RAF Elmas between 8 July and 7 November 1944. RAF Kabrit between 21 April 1945 and 14 April 1946.		
No. 118 MU	RAF Basrah between 19 October 1941 and 30 April 1943. RAF Catania between 15 October 1943 and 21 September 1944.		
No. 119 MU	RAF Shaibah between 19 October 1941 and 1 July 1945.		
No. 120 MU	RAF Ras el Ain.		
No. 121 MU	Fuka (Libya) from July 1941 until July 1942; Aqir (Palestine) from July 1942 until November 1942; Western Desert from November 1942 until July 1943; Sicily from July 1943 until September 1943; Italy from September 1943 until July 1945	Unknown	Disbanded
No. 122 MU	RAF Tobruk		
No. 123 MU	Aqir (Palestine) from June 1941 until December 1941; Beirut (Lebanon) from December 1941 until May 1942; Aqir from May 1942 until September 1942; Baalbeck (Syria) from September 1942 until July 1943; Acre from July 1943 until October 1943; Gaza from October 1943 until July 1944; Campomarino (Italy) from July 1944 until November 1944; Termoli from November 1944 until September 1945	Unknown	Disbanded
No. 124 MU	Burg-el-Arab (Egypt) from September 1941; Various locations Western Desert, Libya, Tunisia; Cerignola (Italy) from December 1943 until April 1944; San Severo from April 1944 until August 1945; Ancona from August 1944 until March 1946	Unknown	Disbanded
No. 125 MU	Habbaniya (Iraq) from January 1942 until February 1942; Kirkuk from February 1942 until October 1943; Massara (Egypt) from October 1943 until March 1944; Aboukir from March 1944 until May 1944; Crescia (Italy) from May 1944 until July 1944; Casserta from July 1944 until August 1944; Bouc-Bel-Air (France) from August 1944 until ? Gragnano – disbanded April 1945	Unknown	Disbanded
No. 126 MU	Zubair (Iraq) from January 1942 until September 1942; Khermanshah from September 1942 until October 1942; Hamadan from October 1942 until April 1943; Abu Sultan from April 1943 until July 1944; Italy from July 1944 until February 1946; Rivolto from February 1946 until June 1947	Unknown	Disbanded
No. 127 MU	Zubair, Iraq from July 1942 until April 1945	Unknown	Disbanded
No. 128 MU	Fayid, Egypt from September 1942 until January 1943; Abu Sultan from January 1943 until December 1945		
No. 129 MU	Gaza, Palestine from June 1942 until December 1944	Unknown	Disbanded
No. 130 MU	Helwan, Egypt from January 1944 until March 1944	Unknown	Disbanded
No. 131 MU	RAF Khormaksar, Aden – March 1942 until 1966	In 1965 it was servicing Blackburn Beverley, Armstrong Whitworth Argosy, Scottish Aviation and Bristol Belvedere aircraft	
No. 132 MU	Fayoum Road, near Almaza, Egypt from June 1942 until July 1942; Gaza, Palestine from July 1942 until October 1942; Matariya from October 1942 until July 1943; Helwan from July 1943 until March 1945; El Firdan from March 1945 until July 1945; Ismailia from July 1945 until October 1945		
No. 133 MU	RAF Eastleigh, Kenya Colony		
No. 134 MU	Ahwaz, Iran from May 1942 until May 1943; Habbaniya, Iraq from May 1943		
No. 135 MU	LG.237, North Africa; Gebel Hamzi, Egypt from May 1943 until November 1946	Unknown	Disbanded
No. 136 MU	Burg El Arab, Egypt Aqir, Palestine – disbanded August 1942; Khanka, Egypt November 1942; Berka Main, Libya from April 1943 until May 1946	Unknown	Re-formed as 36 MU (Advanced Aircraft Depot) Khanka, Egypt November 1942 Re-formed as 136 Mobile Air Depot, Khanka, Egypt, September 1942;
No. 137 MU	Malta		
No. 138 MU	Teheran, Persia (Iran) – disbanded September 1945		
No. 139 MU	Middle East		
No. 140 MU	Khatatba, Egypt – disbanded July 1944	Unknown	Disbanded
No. 141 MU	Qena, Egypt; Tripoli, Libya from April 1943 until November 1943; Caserta, Italy from November 1943 until July 1944; San Nicandro from July 1944 until January 1946; Bitteto from January 1946 until July 1946		
No. 142 MU	Acre, Palestine from September 1942 until March 1943; Nahariah from March 1943	Explosive Storage Depot from June 1946.	5 (Middle East) Air Depot, Acre, Palestine; became 142 Maintenance Unit September 1942; moved to Nahariah March 1943; reformed as 142 MU (Explosive Storage Depot) Fort Agrud June 1946.
No. 143 MU	Hamrun from November 1942 until February 1943; Kalafrana from February 1945 until April 1945		Equipment Depot, Malta, formed at Hamrun November 1942; became 143 Maintenance Unit February 1943; moved to Kalafrana February 1945; disbanded April 1945
No. 144 MU	Maison Blanche, Algeria		
No. 145 MU	Casablanca, Morocco from March 1943 until April 1945	Unknown	Disbanded
No. 146 MU	Sidi Tabet, Tunisia from May 1943 until June 1944; Crescia from June 1944 until October 1944; Draria from October 1944 until April 1945	Unknown	Disbanded
No. 148 MU			
No. 149 MU			
No. 151 MU	Seletar, Singapore; disbanded February 1942		
No. 152 MU	Bukit Panjang, Singapore July 1941		
No. 153 MU	Kuala Lumpur, Malaya from June 1941		
No. 154 MU	Mingaladon from July 1941 until January 1942; Meiktila from January 1942 until March 1942; Lashio from March 1942		
No. 155 MU	Setif, Algeria from May 1943 until March 1945.	Unknown	1 Aircraft Repair Unit, renamed 7 Aircraft Repair Unit, then 155 Maintenance Unit, May 1943; based at Setif, Algeria and disbanded March 1945
No. 156 MU	Blida, Algeria		Includes detachment at Boufarik
No. 157 MU	Helwan, Egypt		
No. 158 MU	Helwan, Egypt		
No. 159 MU	Mellaha, Libya; Gioia, Italy from November 1943 until January 1944; Brindisi from January 1944 until May 1944; Capodichino from May 1944 until October 1946.	Unknown	Disbanded
No. 160 MU	Aqir, Palestine from September 1943 until est. December 1945	Unknown	In leadup to the RAF evacuation of Palestine (1947-48), 160 MU at RAF Aqir held "most of the valuable spare and equipment, and this proved to be the most difficult station to defend and hence to evacuate cleanly. There were many thefts.. and the CO managed to get most of his huge range of equipment away in safety. [N]o purchaser could be found and the AOC [AOC Levant, Air Commodore W L Dawson] had reluctantly to order the abandonment of the station." Station HQ disbanded 15 January 1948.(RAFweb) Later that year it became the Israeli Tel Nof Airbase.
No. 161 MU	Fayid, Egypt	Unknown	became 2 Transport Aircraft Repair Unit, and moved to Kabrit, March 1944
No. 162 MU	Setif, Algeria from August 1943 until July 1944. Blida from July 1944 until est. July 1945.	Unknown	Disbanded
No. 163 MU	Ras el Ma, Morocco from July 1943 until September 1943; Oujda from September 1943 until June 1944; Blida, Algeria from June 1944 until July 1944.	Unknown	Disbanded
No. 164 MU	Tunis, Tunisia from June 1943 until Est. May 1944.	Unknown	
No. 165 MU	Kajiado, Kenya; Gilgil from November 1943 until July 1944.	Unknown	Disbanded
No. 166 MU	Nicosia (Cyprus) from November 1943 until January 1944; Lakatamia January 1944 until April 1944; Nicosia from April 1944 until August 1945.	Unknown	Disbanded
No. 167 MU	Sidi Ahmed, near Bizerta, Tunisia from September 1943 until March 1944.	Unknown	113 Repair and Salvage Unit, formed at Sidi Ahmed, near Bizerta, Tunisia, May 1943; became 167 Maintenance Unit, September 1943.
No. 168 MU	RAF Heliopolis		Formed from British Airways Repair Unit (B.A.R.U.) at Heliopolis on 1 March 1944, remained there until at least Jan 1946.
No. 176 MU	Hastings, Sierra Leone from December 1941 until July 1942. Kosso Town from July 1942 until September 1945.	Unknown	Disbanded
No. 177 MU			
No. 178 MU	Takoradi, Gold Coast (now Ghana) from June 1943 until September 1943		
No. 179 MU	Oshodi, Nigeria		

== No. 201 MU – No. 300 MU ==
Name	Airfields used	Equipment serviced	Notes
No. 201 MU	RAF Poynton between 1942 and 1944. RAF Handforth between 1942 and 1944.		
No. 202 MU	RAF Longparish between 1942 and 1955.		
No. 203 MU	RAF Newark between 1942 and 1945.		
No. 204 MU	RAF Rushden between 1942 and 1945.		
No. 205 MU	Ratho later RAF Bishopbriggs between 1942 and 1946.		
No. 206 MU	RAF Swanton Morley during 1943. Hillingdon during 1943.		
No. 207 MU	RAF East Retford between 1942 and 1945.		
No. 208 MU	Golden Grove locally known as Gelli Aur (later renamed RAF Llandeilo) between 1942 and 1945.<RCAHMW>		
No. 209 MU	RAF Broughton between 1943 and 1946.		
No. 210 MU	RAF Romsey between 1942 and 1945.		
No. 211 MU	RAF Sawbridgeworth between 1942 and 1945		
No. 212 MU	Wembley between 1943 and 1947		
No. 213 MU	RAF Dumbarton between 1942 and 1947. RAF Greenock between 1942 and 1947.	Marine Craft	
No. 214 MU	Newport between 1943 and 1947.		
No. 215 MU	Locharbriggs between 1942 and 1945. Sub site at RAF Tinwald Downs.		
No. 216 MU	Sutton Coldfield between 1942 and 1957.		
No. 217 MU	RAF Cardington	Compressed Gas production unit.	
No. 218 MU	RAF Colerne.		
No. 219 MU			
No. 220 MU			
No. 221 MU			
No. 222 MU			
No. 223 MU			
No. 224 MU			
No. 225 MU			
No. 226 MU			
No. 227 MU			
No. 228 MU			
No. 229 MU	RAF Harrowbeer between 1942 and 1943		
No. 230 MU			
No. 231 MU			
No. 232 MU	RAF Market Stainton between 1943 and 1948.	Gas bombs, Tallboys and general munitions.	
No. 233 MU	RAF Market Stainton; RAF Goxill between 27 May 1945 and 14 December 1953.	Bomb Storage	Bomb Storage
No. 235 MU			
No. 236 MU			
No. 237 MU			
No. 238 MU	RAF Calshot end of Southampton Water, tasked with overhauling Air/Sea Rescue Launches. Closed in 1961, when work transferred to RAF Mount Batten, Plymouth.		Sub site RAF Colerne?
No. 239 MU			
No. 240 MU			
No. 241 MU			
No. 242 MU	Lajes Field between 1944 and 1946.		
No. 243 MU			
No. 244 MU			
No. 245 MU			
No. 246 MU			
No. 247 MU			
No. 248 MU	RAF Chessington	Medical Equipment Storage Unit	
No. 249 MU			
No. 250 MU			
No. 251 MU			
No. 252 MU			
No. 253 MU	RAF Spanhoe between 8 July 1945 and Spring 1947.	Preparing military vehicles to be sold in public auctions.	
No. 254 MU	RAF Balderton between 15 June 1945 and 1954.	4,000 lb bombs and general ammunition	Formerly No. 1 Equipment Disposal Depot. Bombs were stored on the runways.
No. 255 MU	RAF Fulbeck; RAF Saltby until 26 October 1948.		
No. 256 MU	RAF Barkston Heath	War Surplus Storage Depot	
No. 257 MU			
No. 258 MU	RAF Shipdam; Sub site at RAF North Pickenham between August 1945 and March 1948.		
No. 259 MU	RAF North Witham between 1 July 1945 and May 1946.	Equipment Disposal Depot	
No. 260 MU	RAF Errol		(56 Maintenance Wing)
No. 261 MU	RAF Morpeth.		
No. 262 MU	RAF Horham between October 1945 and October 1948. RAF Snetterton Heath between January 1946 and 1948.		
No. 263 MU	RAF Stansted Mountfitchet from August 1945 until October 1947. RAF Hitcham from October 1947. Satellite at RAF Stansted Mountfitchet from October 1947 until April 1949.		
No. 264 MU			
No. 265 MU	Woodford, Cheshire		
No. 266 MU			
No. 267 MU			
No. 268 MU			
No. 272 MU			
No. 273 MU	RAF Polebrook; No. 113 Sub-storage Depot at RAF Market Stainton between February 1946 and 27 April 1947.	Dismantling Airspeed Horsa gliders.	
No. 274 MU	RAF Little Snoring between December 1945 and 1947. Sub site at RAF North Creake between 30 September 1945 and September 1947. Sub site at RAF Oulton between 3 October 1945 and November 1947. RAF Swannington between 1 October 1945 and November 1947.		
No. 275 MU			
No. 276 MU			
No. 277 MU			
No. 278 MU			
No. 279 MU			
No. 280 MU			
No. 281 MU	RAF North Pickenham between 1949 and unknown	Supplied ammunition	USAF and RAF personnel together.
No. 282 MU			
No. 290 MU			
No. 291 MU	RAF Stoke Heath 1956 RAF Sealand 1958	Aircraft Radar Maintenance	Date of move to Sealand is approx.

== No. 301 MU – No. 400 MU ==
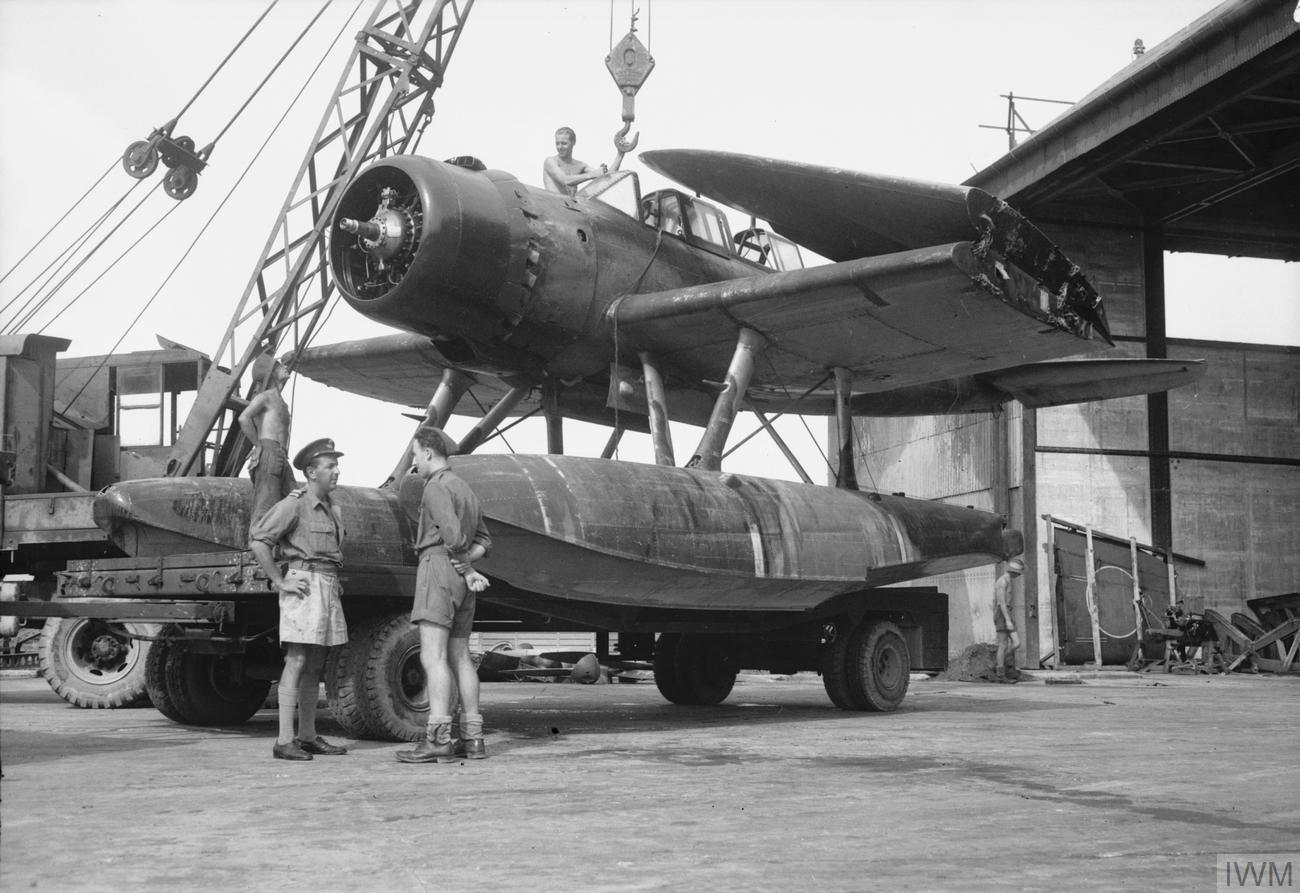
A Japanese Aichi E13A reconnaissance seaplane is loaded aboard a flatbed truck at Seletar Airport, Singapore, by members of 126 Repair and Salvage Unit (RAF).

Name	Airfields used	Equipment serviced	Notes
No. 301 MU	RAF Drigh Road, Karachi in 1942		
No. 302 MU			
No. 303 MU			
No. 304 MU			
No. 305 MU			
No. 306 MU			
No. 307 MU			
No. 308 MU	Bamrauli, near Allahabad, India	Repair and storage of aircraft	
No. 309 MU			
No. 310 MU			
No. 312 MU			
No. 313 MU	Kankinara, India		
No. 314 MU			
No. 315 MU			
No. 316 MU			
No. 317 MU			
No. 318 (X) MU	Hubbulpore between 1943 and 1947	Ammunition	
No. 319 MU			
No. 320 MU			
No. 321 MU	RAF Trichinopoly, now Tiruchirapalli International Airport, Aug-Nov 1942		
No. 322 MU	Chakeri, Kanpur (Cawnpore), Uttar Pradesh		Tasked with the demolition of B-24 SEAC Liberators 1945–1947
No. 325 MU			
No. 326 MU			
No. 327 MU			
No. 328 MU			
No. 329 MU	Bally, on the Barrackpore Road (Calcutta / Kolkata, West Bengal)		
No. 330 MU			
No. 331 MU			
No. 332 MU			
No. 333 MU			
No. 335 MU			
No. 336 MU			
No. 337 MU			
No. 338 (X) MU			
No. 340 (X) MU			
No. 341 (X) MU	Pulgaon, in the municipal council of Wardha district in the Indian state of Maharashtra.		Included a motor transport section
No. 342 MU			
No. 343 (X) MU		Whitefields India (Bangalore). Lt/Col G Bennett RAOC	Sgt AJJ Green 1479355
No. 344 (X) MU			
No. 345 (X) MU			
No. 346 MU			
No. 351 MU	Hussein Dey, French North Africa (now Algeria)	September 1942 to June 1946 or December 1943 to March 1946	
No. 352 MU			
No. 353 MU			
No. 355 MU			
No. 356 MU			
No. 357 MU			
No. 358 MU			
No. 359 MU			
No. 360 MU			
No. 361 MU			
No. 362 MU			
No. 363 MU			
No. 364 MU			
No. 374 MU			
No. 375 MU			
No. 376 MU			
No. 377 MU			
No. 378 MU			
No. 379 MU			
No. 380 MU			
No. 381 MU			
No. 382 MU	RAF Syerston between 23 July 1945 and October 1945.		
No. 383 MU			
No. 384 MU			
No. 385 MU			
No. 386 MU			
No. 389 MU			
No. 390 MU	RAF Seletar, Singapore between 1964 and 1966.		
No. 392 MU	Brindisi between 1945 and 1946.		
No. 394 MU	RAF Heany between 1947 and 1954.	Aircraft Repair and Storage Depot	
No. 395 MU	RAF Bulawayo between 1947 and 1954.		
No. 396 MU	Mombasa between 1947 and 1950.		
No. 397 MU	Safi between 1947 and 1955.		
No. 398 MU	Hesedorf between 1948 and 1964.		
No. 399 MU	Scheuen between 1948 and 1949.		

== No. 401 MU – No. 500 MU ==
Name	Airfields used	Equipment serviced	Notes
No. 420 MU	RAF Laarbruch between 1961 and 1967.	English Electric Canberras, crash recovery.	From Oct 1943: Romford, Ludnam, Hutton Cranswick, Matlask Bognor, Appledram (Chichester), Caen, Lille, Brussels, Antwerp, Bergen op Zoom, Breda, Nigmegan, Arnheim, Enslhede, Amsterdam, Osnebruck, Celle (Belsen), Fassburgh (Hamburg).
No. 431 MU	RAF Bruggen between 1960 and 1993.	4th line airframe repair.	Part of RAF Germany.

== No. 1 (India) MU – No. 10 (India) MU ==
Name	Airfields used	Equipment serviced	Notes
No. 1 (INDIA) MU	Drigh Road.		1942 became 301 MU.
No. 2 (INDIA) MU	Allahabad.		1941–1942 became 302 MU.
No. 3 (INDIA) MU	Ambala.		1941–1942 became 303 MU.
No. 4 (INDIA) MU	Asansol.		1942 – became 304 MU.

== See also ==
- List of Royal Air Force aircraft squadrons
- List of RAF Regiment units
- List of Fleet Air Arm aircraft squadrons
- List of Army Air Corps aircraft units
- List of Air Training Corps squadrons
- List of Battle of Britain squadrons
- University Air Squadron
- Air Experience Flight
- Volunteer Gliding Squadron
- List of Royal Air Force units & establishments
- List of Royal Air Force schools
- List of Royal Air Force aircraft independent flights
- List of RAF squadron codes
- List of conversion units of the Royal Air Force
- United Kingdom military aircraft serial numbers
- United Kingdom aircraft test serials
- British military aircraft designation systems
- Royal Air Force roundels
