= RAF Methven =

RAF Methven No. 24 SLG
- Methven, Perth and Kinross in Scotland

Site information
- Type: Satellite Landing Ground
- Owner: Air Ministry
- Operator: Royal Air Force
- Controlled by: RAF Maintenance Command

Location
- Shown within Perth and Kinross RAF Methven (the United Kingdom)
- Coordinates: 56°24′38″N 003°32′04″W

Site history
- Built: 1940/41
- In use: 1941-1945
- Battles/wars: European theatre of World War II

Airfield information
- Elevation: 38 metres (125 ft) AMSL
Runways
Direction	Length and surface
00/00	Grass
00/00	Grass
00/00	Grass

Royal Air Force Methven, or more simply RAF Methven, was a World War 2 Royal Air Force Satellite Landing Ground (SLG) located 1.6 miles (2.6 km) south east of Methven, Perth and Kinross, Scotland and 4.1 miles (6.6 km) west of Perth, Perth and Kinross.

== Station history ==
- No. 652 Squadron RAF was based at the airfield, where the squadron was equipped with the Taylorcraft Auster III, between 28 March 1943 and 2 July 1943 before the squadron moved to RAF Ayr.
- SLG for No. 44 Maintenance Unit RAF for aircraft storage from the main station of RAF Edzell. (1 July 1941–1945)

== See also ==
- List of former Royal Air Force stations
- List of Royal Air Force Satellite Landing Grounds
