= RAF Tura =

RAF Tura
- سلاح الجو الملكي في طرة
- Tura, Cairo Governorate in Egypt

Site information
- Type: Royal Air Force station
- Owner: Air Ministry
- Operator: Royal Air Force
- Controlled by: RAF Middle East Command
- Condition: Closed

Location
- Shown within Egypt
- Coordinates: 29°56′53″N 31°18′11″E

Site history
- Built: 1941
- In use: 1941 - 1945
- Fate: Closed at the end of World War II
- Battles/wars: Mediterranean and Middle East theatre of World War II

Garrison information
- Garrison: No. 111 Maintenance Unit RAF

Royal Air Force Tura or more simply RAF Tura is a former Royal Air Force station located in Tura, Cairo Governorate, Egypt. The station is located in underground tunnels, which housed storage and maintenance workshops, engine repair, signals repair, and general engineering sections.

== History ==
The station was built in already-existing tunnels, formed by the ancient Egyptians to quarry out limestone for the casing stones of the pyramids.

=== Tura quarry ===
According to recent surveys, the quarrying system involved interconnecting tunnels, known as “fingers”. These tunnels were arranged roughly parallel to each other, conforming to the shape of a human hand. Each tunnel was managed by a foreman responsible for the excavation. Well-reposed natural pillars and dry-packed stone walls with rubble cores to support the roof were used to prevent collapse. Despite the safety precautions, mining accidents were frequent due to negligence in the maintenance of the support structures. Rubble from excavations were also repurposed to reinforce tunnels. Tools like heavy wooden mallets, steel edges, and brass bolsters were used to split stone blocks.

=== RAF Tura ===
In August 1941, RAF Tura was originally utilized as a military storage installation used by the British Army for ammunition storage. To facilitate this, a team of workmen was sent out to clear the debris that had accumulated over time. However, workmen in no. 35 Quarry retrieved a considerable collection of Greek papyri, containing works of Origen and Didymus the Blind. However, the quarry had no signs of functioning as a Hermitage, even though such traces could have been removed during cleaning. It is considered that the quarry was rather used by a nearby monastery to hide important works during the beginning of the Arab conquest.

In September 1941, the No. 2 Field Survey Depot RE with other units moved into the station, as RAF Heliopolis was considered too vulnerable. The No. 19 Field Survey Company RE was also stationed the following month, with printing and drawing sections established in the caves.

Located in the general engineer sections included stripping, cylinder machining and engine assembly. The station also operated engine test benches, which the sound was muffled over the dunes, and engine repairs were also in constant demand. On 22 August 1942, Winston Churchill inspected No. 111 Maintenance Unit and recorded that "Everything looked very smart and efficient on the spot, and an immense amount of work was being done day and night by masses of skilled men. But I had my tables of facts and figures and remained dissatisfied. The scale was far too small." The No. 111 Maintenance Unit was formed from a sub-station of the 109 MU in August 1941, and by October 1942, had moved into RAF Tura to repair aircraft engines of the Royal Air Force. No. 111 MU established aircraft and engine repair, signals repair, general engineer sections within the caves, which also housed Army elements and a small hospital. In November 1942, a boxing ring was constructed and held tournaments by RAF personnel. RAF Tura had the following facilities: Issues Department, Non-Expendable Store, camp, caves, crystal pool, huts, loading ramp, main entrance to caves, No. 1 Reserve Cave, print area, cave plan, special packing bay, quiet room and chapel, 19 Company section, draughtsmen, and presses.

=== 1943 - 1947 ===
In August 1943, the Depot War Establishment was amended, with the unit mostly consisting of Palestinian and Jewish personnel, which released UK survey tradesmen to pursue more important work. Following the cease of hostilities in 1947, the station was evidently closed, and by March, No. 111 Maintenance Unit was disbanded. In February 1947, the remaining survey units in RAF Tura moved out to the Survey Camp at Abbassia, Cairo. By April 1947, following the decision to consolidate UK units to the Canal Zone, the units were moved to RAF Fayid.

=== RAF Station Church (St Michael’s Church) ===
Following the visit of a Bishop of Maidstone, who preached in a Cathedral in Cairo, funds were collected by the station to build the St Michael’s Church. In April 1942, construction begun and men from nearby British camps helped with the construction, including the Royal Navy which donated a bell to the church. As the war intensified in North Africa, the construction faced a difficult decision whether it should continue or be abandoned. However, on June 6, 1948, an opening service was held by Rev. Canon P. H. Saunders-Davies and was recorded by the British Broadcasting Company (BBC). Today, the church still exists.

== RAF Units ==
The following units that were based at RAF Tura:<

Royal Air Force

- No. 101 Maintenance Unit between 1937 and 1947.
- No. 111 Maintenance Unit from October 1941 to 1945.
- RAF Tyre Retreading Unit of Middle East Command
- No. 2 Engine Repair Section
- No. 3 Engine Repair Section
- Engine Test Section c/o No 111 MU
- No. 4 Hellenic Air Force Technical Unit

British Army

- No. 2 Field Survey Depot RE from September 1941 to February 1946
- No. 19 Field Survey Company RE from September 1941 to February 1946
- Elements of the 512 Army Field Survey RE

== See also ==
- List of North African airfields during World War II
- Photo collection of RAF Tura
