= Dumfries and Galloway Aviation Museum =

Aviation museum in Dumfries, Scotland

- Location within Dumfries and Galloway
- Established: 1977
- Location: Dumfries, Dumfries and Galloway
- Coordinates: 55.091°N 3.569°W
- Type: Aviation museum
- Website: www.dumfriesaviationmuseum.com

The Dumfries and Galloway Aviation Museum is a volunteer-operated aviation museum located in and around the World War II-era watch tower (control tower) at the former RAF Dumfries, located two miles north east of the centre of Dumfries, Scotland, which was in service from June 1940 until 1957, when it closed. The site was sold to a private company in 1960. The museum, founded in 1977 by the Dumfries and Galloway Aviation Group, has a collection of aircraft, both civil and military, aero engines, artifacts, and a small, but "ever expanding collection of memorabilia honouring airborne forces."

== History ==
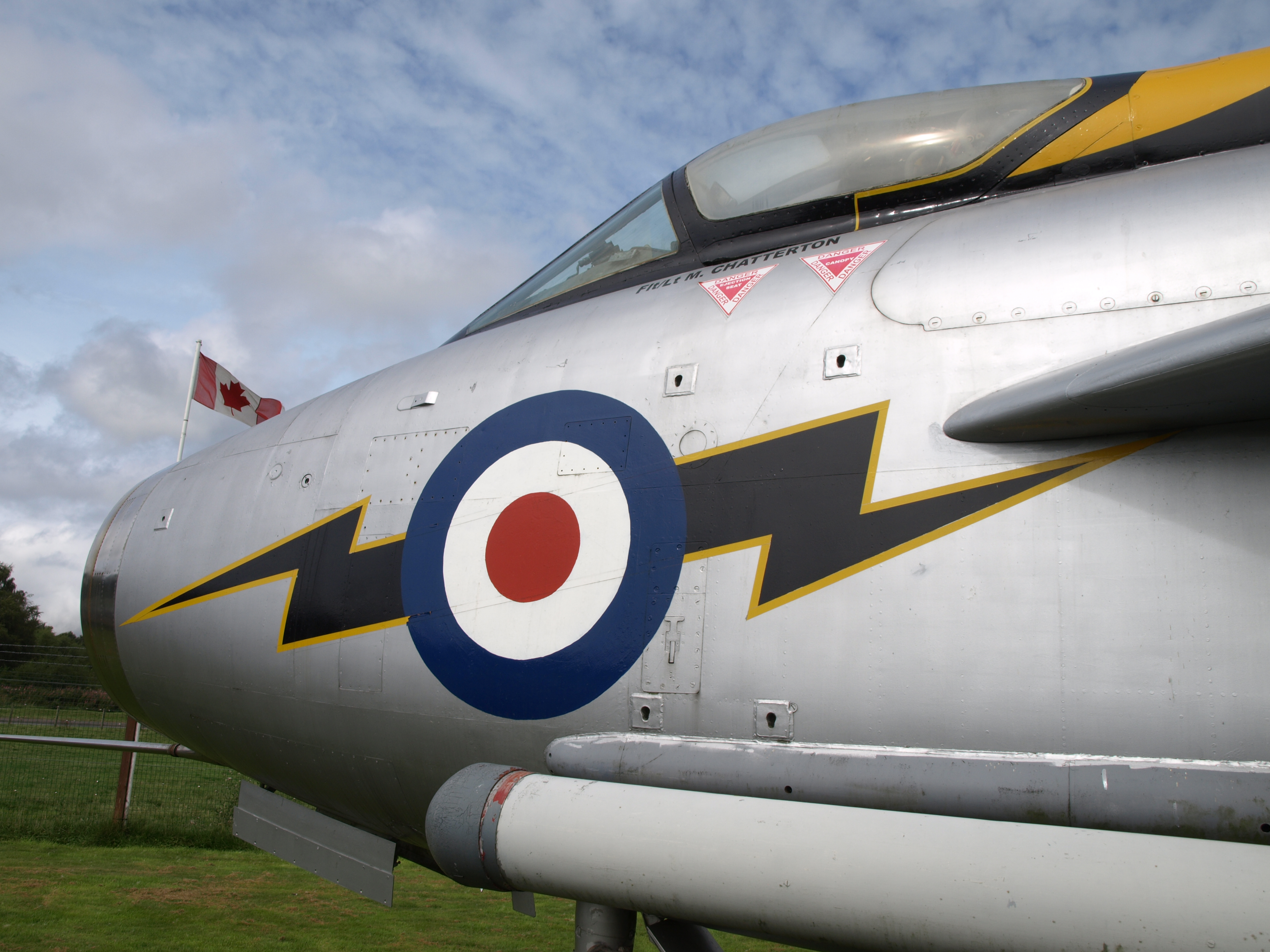
The museum's English Electric Lightning F53

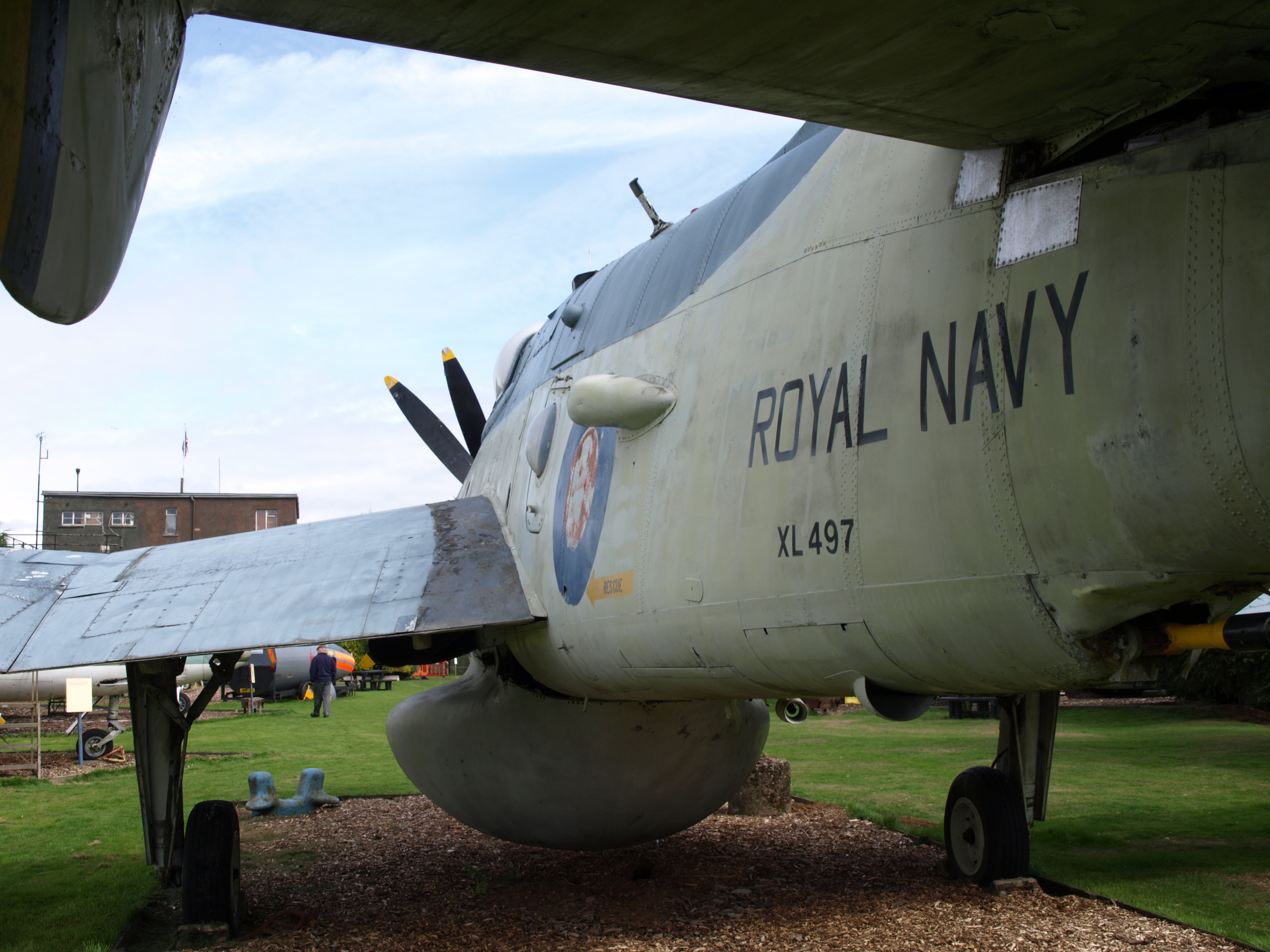
Fairey Gannet XL497

On the night of 3/4 June 1943, a Vickers Wellington Type 440 B Mk. X bomber, HE746, of 26 OTU, RAF, was on a flight from RAF Wing near Leighton Buzzard, departing there at 2340 hrs., when it suffered a failure to one of its Bristol Hercules engines and crashed short of the runway. Three of the crew were killed and two others were seriously injured. In 1973–74 the two engines were recovered. One with its wooden propeller is exhibited in the museum.

Further excavations in the following two years yielded more artefacts and in 1976 the Dumfries and Galloway Aviation Group was formed to shepherd a display of these items, the obvious location for the new museum being the former RAF Dumfries. The museum opened to the public in 1977, initially housed in the old pilot's flight hut which was last occupied by the local Dumfries Gliding Club, giving the building a long history in aviation. The first complete airframes exhibited were a de Havilland Vampire T11 and a Gloster Meteor T7, acquired from the Royal Aircraft Establishment at West Freugh, an airfield 80 miles west of Dumfries. The opening ceremony was conducted by Michał Cwynar DFC, a Polish fighter ace, who became the museum's patron.

In addition to the salvaged Hercules mount, the museum also has one of the Bristol Centaurus engines from the Blackburn B-20, V8914, an experimental flying-boat with retractable lower-hull, lost on 7 April 1940 after suffering severe aileron flutter – 3 crew killed, 2 rescued by HMS Transylvania. The aircraft's wreck still exists, but remains undisturbed as it is designated a war grave. In 1998, one of the engines was raised as it had been caught in a fishing boat's nets and dragged away from the wreck, into shallower water.

One of the Junkers Jumo 211s is displayed from a Heinkel He 111H-4 of 1 Gruppe of Kampfgeschwader 4 (1/KG4), based at Soesterberg, the Netherlands, which became lost on 8 August 1940, during a mission to lay mines off Belfast, and collided with the summit of Cairnsmore of Fleet in the Galloway Hills of Scotland, whereupon the ordnance on board exploded, killing the four aircrew. All are buried at Cannock Chase German war cemetery in Staffordshire, England.

By 1979, with the acquisition of a North American F-100 Super Sabre, a Lockheed T-33 Shooting Star, and a Dassault Mystère, the museum had outgrown the small space surrounding the flight hut, and the museum moved into the three-storey watch tower (control tower) where it resides today. In 2003 the museum became a registered charity (Registered Charity No. SCO35189).

In 1992, the museum was involved in the recovery of Spitfire AD540, nicknamed 'Blue Peter' after the 1939 Derby winner. The recovery was filmed in conjunction with the popular children’s tv show ‘Blue Peter’ and the presenter, John Leslie was present during the recovery. This Spitfire had crash-landed on the slopes of Cairnsmore of Carsphairn in 1942. Its pilot, Pilot Officer David Hunter-Blair, was killed in the crash. The aircraft was one of many supported by public donations during the war and was officially allocated to 242 Squadron. The engine and remains are currently on display at the museum in unrestored condition.

In 2017, Spitfire Mk.IIa P7540, was fully restored and unveiled to the public.

== Aircraft on display ==
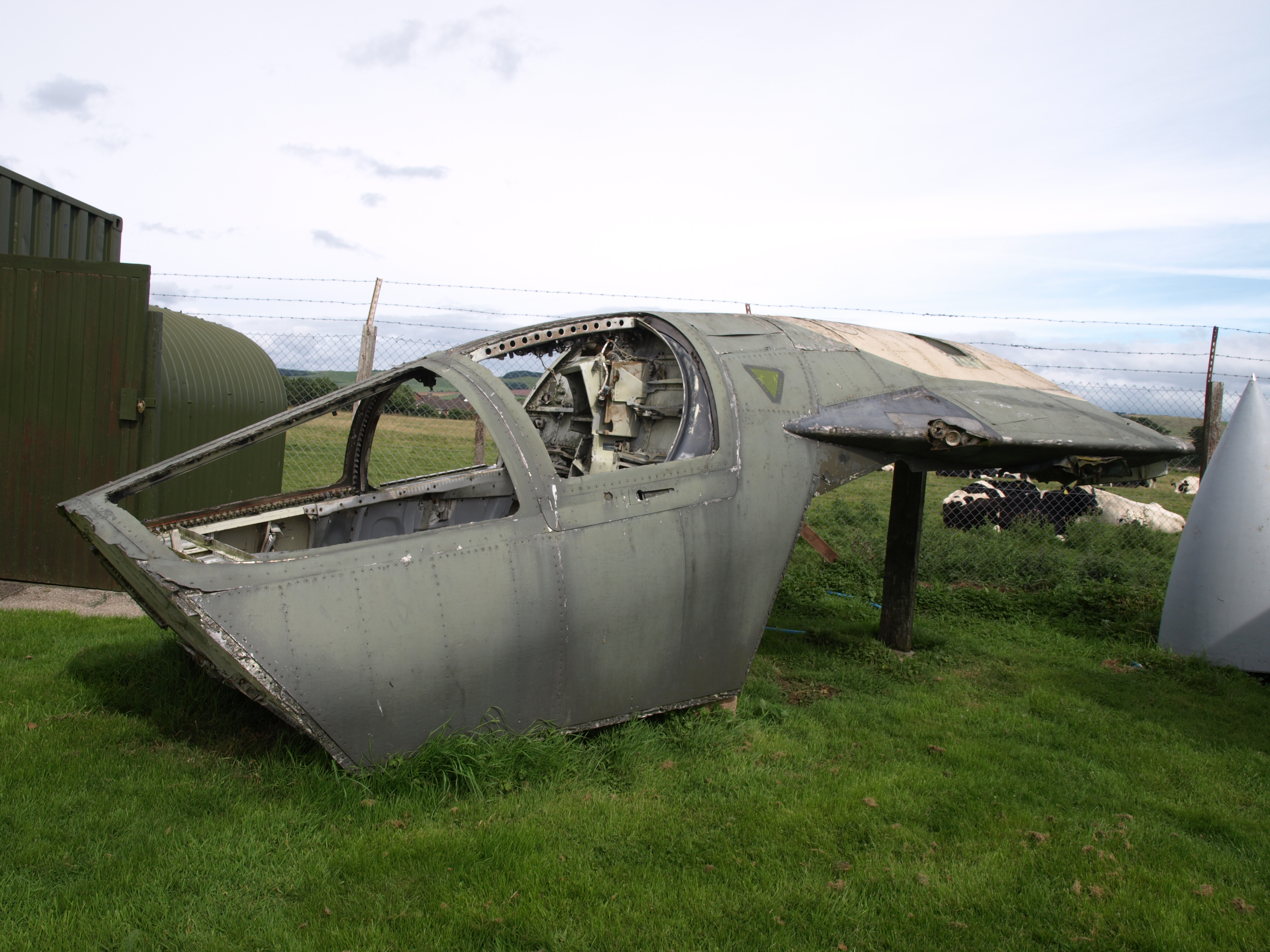
General Dynamics F-111E Escape Pod

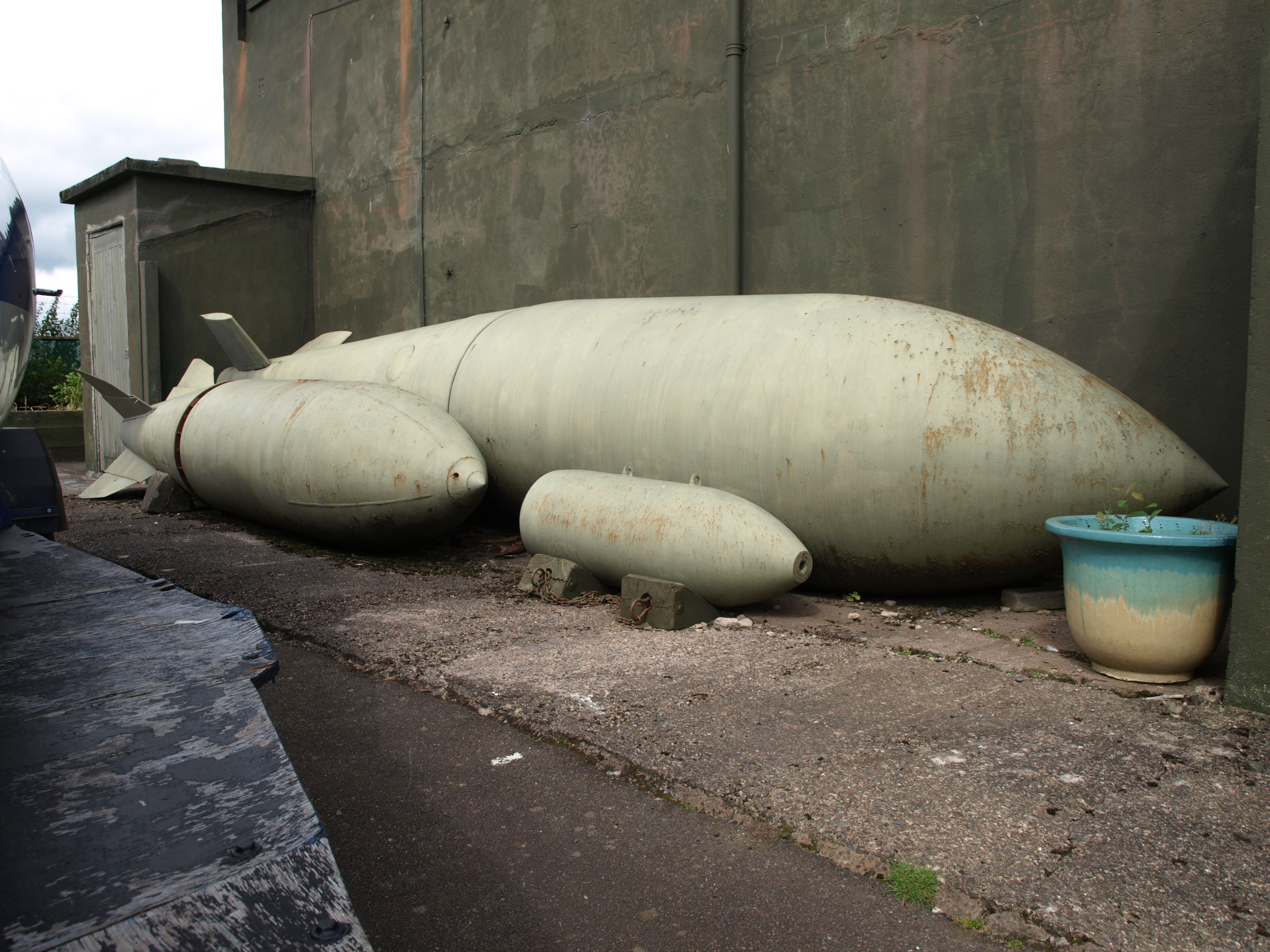
Grand Slam bomb

- BAC Jet Provost T.4 XP557
- Bristol Sycamore 3 WA576
- Dassault Mystère IVA 8-NY
- English Electric Canberra T.4 WJ880
- English Electric Lightning F.53 ZF584
- Fairey Gannet AEW.3 XL497
- General Dynamics F-111E 68-060 – Escape capsule
- Gloster Meteor T.7 (mod) WL375
- Handley Page Jetstream T.2, XX483
- Hawker Hunter F.4 WT746
- Hawker Siddeley Buccaneer S.2B XT280
- Hawker Siddeley Trident 3B G-AWZJ
- Lockheed T-33A FT-36 "Little Miss Laura"
- North American F-100D Super Sabre 54-2163
- Saab J 35A Draken 35075
- SEPECAT Jaguar GR.1 XZ390
- Supermarine Spitfire IIa P7540
- Supermarine Spitfire Vb AD540
- Westland Wessex HU.5 XT486
- Westland Sea King HAS2 XV699

== See also ==
- List of aerospace museums
