= RAF Greenock =

Former RAF station in Scotland

RAF Greenock
- Greenock, Inverclyde in Scotland

Site information
- Owner: Air Ministry
- Operator: Royal Air Force
- Controlled by: RAF Coastal Command

Location
- Shown within Inverclyde RAF Greenock (the United Kingdom)
- Coordinates: 55°56′59″N 4°45′12″W

Site history
- Built: 1940
- In use: 1940-1945
- Battles/wars: European theatre of World War II

RAF Greenock was a Royal Air Force station in Greenock, Scotland from 1940 to 1945.

RAF Greenock was created on 10 October 1940 as a maintenance base for RAF flying boats. Seaplanes had previously been used at the site in the 1930s. The base was hit on 7 May 1941 during the Greenock Blitz, when a hangar and storage facility were hit, and several aircraft were destroyed.

The following units were here at some point:

- No. 2 Flying Boat Servicing Unit (September 1942 - 1945)
- No. 97 Maintenance Unit RAF (August - October 1945)
- No. 213 Maintenance Unit RAF (October 1945 - November 1947)

Supermarine Stranraers, Consolidated Catalinas and Short Sunderlands were maintained at the site.

It ceased to be an RAF base in 1945 but continued in civilian use until 1950.

As of 2012, the RAF Club Greenock is still open.
