= RAF Dumfries =

Former RAF base in Scotland

RAF Dumfries
- Dumfries, Dumfries and Galloway in Scotland
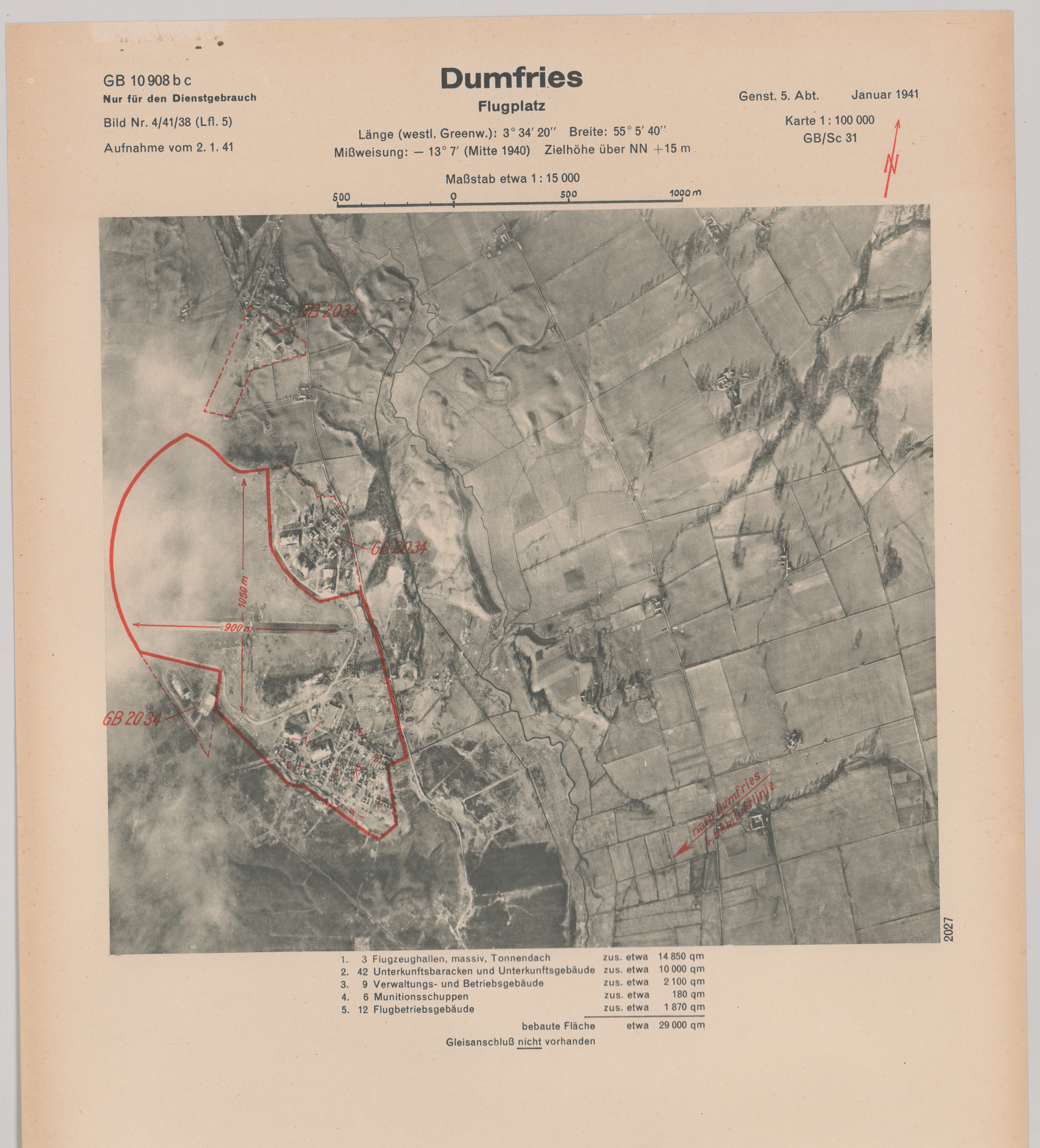
- RAF Dumfries on a target dossier of the German Luftwaffe, 1941

Site information
- Type: Royal Air Force station
- Owner: Air Ministry
- Operator: Royal Air Force
- Controlled by: RAF Flying Training Command; RAF Maintenance Command

Location
- Shown within Dumfries and Galloway RAF Dumfries (the United Kingdom)
- Coordinates: 55°05′32″N 003°34′12″W

Site history
- Built: 1939/40
- In use: 1940-1957
- Battles/wars: European theatre of World War II

Airfield information
Runways
Direction	Length and surface
00/00	Asphalt
00/00	Asphalt
00/00	Asphalt

Royal Air Force Dumfries or more simply RAF Dumfries was a former Royal Air Force station located near Dumfries, Dumfries and Galloway Scotland. The airfield opened on 17 June 1940 and was sold in 1960 to a private firm.

The disused airfield is now used as the Dumfries and Galloway Aviation Museum.

== History ==
No. 18 Maintenance Unit RAF, (18 MU) was allotted to No. 41 Group RAF (41 Gp) and became the lodger unit on 17 June 1940. No aircraft were flown in until the end of June when the obstructions placed on the airfield to prevent enemy aircraft from landing were removed. 18 MU reverted to a tenant unit on 13 July 1940 and No. 10 Bombing and Gunnery School RAF (10 B&GS) of No. 25 Group RAF (25 Gp) (RAF Flying Training Command) relocated from RAF Warmwell, Dorset. 10 B&GS trained bomb-aimers and gunners in Handley Page H.P.54 Harrows and Fairey Battles before further training at Operational Training Units.

The airfield consisted of a grass runway, upgraded to hard surfaces due to the demands of operational training. Whilst this work was being undertaken 10 B&GS utilised the satellite landing ground at RAF Winterseugh, Annan, Dumfries and Galloway.

Due to the numbers of aircraft 18 MU was forced to disperse the aircraft to satellite landing grounds at RAF Low Eldrig near Stranraer, RAF Lennoxlove near Haddington, RAF Wath Head in Cumbria and also RAF Hornby Hall, Cumbria. No. 11 Sub-Ferry Flight was posted to the airfield between April and July 1940.

10 B&GS was re-designated No. 10 Air Observers School RAF (10 AOS) in September 1940 and began training navigators in Armstrong Whitworth Whitley and Blackburn Botha aircraft. In April 1940 10 AOS was renamed No. 10 (Observers) Advanced Flying Unit RAF (10 (O)AFU) and was re-equipped with Avro Ansons.

RAF Dumfries had a moment of danger on 25 March 1943, when a German Dornier Do 217 aircraft shot up the airfield beacon, but crashed shortly afterwards. The pilot, Oberleutnant Martin Piscke was later interred in Troqueer Cemetery in Dumfries town, with full military honours.

On the night of 3/4 August 1943 a Vickers Wellington bomber with engine problems diverted to Dumfries but crashed 1 ^{1}/_{2} miles (2.4 km) short of the runway.

Over 400 courses had been conducted during the Second World War at RAF Dumfries. 10 (O)AFU was again renamed No. 10 Air Navigation School RAF (10 ANS) in August 1945 and disbanded in September 1945. 18 MU closed in 1957 having prepared and dispatched almost 5,000 aircraft to units and after the war stored aircraft awaiting disposal.

The airfield was a training station for national service recruits to the Royal Air Force Regiment between 1947 and 1957. The airfield was then placed under care and maintenance until the site was sold to a private company in 1960.

The following units were also here at some point:

Squadrons

- No. 225 Squadron RAF
- No. 614 Squadron RAF
- No. 651 Squadron RAF
- No. 652 Squadron RAF

Units

- No. 1 Gliding School RAF (April 1950 – September 1955) became No. 661 Gliding School RAF (September 1955 – January 1958)
- No. 11 (Service) Ferry Pilots Pool RAF (April – June 1941)
- No. 14 Maintenance Unit RAF (April 1955 – July 1957)
- No. 29 Group Communication Flight RAF (July 1942 – July 1945)

== Aviation Museum ==
It now houses the Dumfries and Galloway Aviation Museum, which first opened to the public in the summer of 1977.
