= RAF Bridleway Gate =

Former Royal Air Force base in Shropshire, England

RAF Bridleway Gate
- Wem, Shropshire in England

Site information
- Owner: Air Ministry
- Operator: Royal Air Force
- Controlled by: RAF Maintenance Command; RAF Flying Training Command

Location
- Location within Shropshire
- Coordinates: 52°49′48″N 2°41′09″W

Site history
- Built: 1940
- In use: 1940-1945
- Battles/wars: Second World War

Airfield information
Runways
Direction	Length and surface
00/00	Grass

Royal Air Force Bridleway Gate, or more simply RAF Bridleway Gate, is a former Royal Air Force satellite airfield located in Shropshire.

The following units were here at some point:

- No. 2 Maintenance Unit RAF
- No. 11 (Pilots) Advanced Flying Unit RAF
- No. 11 Service Flying Training School RAF
- No. 245 Maintenance Unit RAF
