= RAF Abbots Bromley =

Former Royal Air Force station

RAF Abbots Bromley
- Near Abbots Bromley, Staffordshire in England
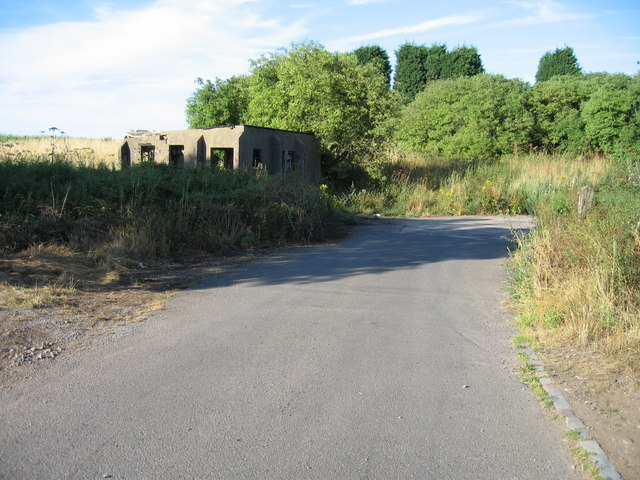
- The now derelict former guardroom at the site of RAF Abbots Bromley in 2006.

Site information
- Type: Relief landing ground
- Owner: Air Ministry
- Operator: Royal Air Force
- Controlled by: RAF Flying Training Command

Location
- Location in Staffordshire
- Coordinates: 52°49′31″N 001°53′29″W

Site history
- Built: 1940
- In use: 1940–31 March 1949
- Fate: Returned to agricultural use, small number of buildings remain.
- Battles/wars: European theatre of World War II

Airfield information
- Elevation: 125 metres (410 ft) AMSL
Runways
Direction	Length and surface
	594 metres (1,949 ft) Grass
	594 metres (1,949 ft) Grass

RAF Abbots Bromley is a former Royal Air Force Relief Landing Ground (RLG) located 0.7 miles (1.1 km) north-west of the village of Abbots Bromley, Staffordshire. The airfield opened during 1940 and closed on 31 March 1949 being the satellite of RAF Burnaston.

== Based units ==
The following units were here at some point:

- Relief Landing Ground for No. 5 Elementary Flying Training School RAF flying de Havilland Tiger Moths (1940–41)
- Relief Landing Ground for No. 16 Elementary Flying Training School RAF between June 1941 and July 1945
- Sub site for No. 21 Maintenance Unit RAF between May 1945 and March 1949

The airfield was also used after the Second World War for storing ammunition.

== Current use ==
There is currently not much of the original site left partly because of the fact it had grass runways and partly due to the period of time elapsed however a guard house and a single Robin hangar remain with part of the site becoming a chicken farm.

== See also ==
- List of former Royal Air Force stations
