= RAF Hornby Hall =

Former RAF airfield in Cumbria, England

RAF Hornby Hall No. 9 SLG
- Near Penrith, Cumbria in England

Site information
- Type: Royal Air Force Station
- Owner: Air Ministry
- Operator: Royal Air Force
- Controlled by: RAF Maintenance Command

Location
- Shown within Cumbria RAF Hornby Hall (the United Kingdom)
- Coordinates: 54°39′26″N 002°39′51″W

Site history
- Built: 1941
- In use: March 1941 - 1945
- Battles/wars: European theatre of World War II

Airfield information
- Elevation: 135 metres (443 ft) AMSL
Runways
Direction	Length and surface
00/00	Grass

Royal Air Force Hornby Hall or more simply RAF Hornby Hall is a former Royal Air Force satellite landing ground located near Brougham, 4 miles (6.4 km) east of Penrith, Cumbria and 8.8 miles (14.2 km) north west of Appleby-in-Westmorland, Cumbria, England.

== History ==
The airfield was opened on 17 March 1941, and was mostly used by No. 22 Maintenance Unit RAF (MU) at RAF Silloth but changed to No. 12 MU at RAF Kirkbride.

The landing ground was also temporarily operated by No. 18 MU at RAF Dumfries sometime between July and September 1940. Closure came in July 1945, when the site was converted into a PoW camp for German prisoners.

=== Aircraft operated ===
- Fairey Battles
- Bristol Blenheims
- Blackburn Bothas
- Lockheed Hudsons

== See also ==
- List of former Royal Air Force stations
