= RAF Woolsington =

Former Royal Air Force station in Tyne and Wear, England (1939–1945)

Coordinates: 55°02′15″N 01°41′30″W

RAF Woolsington
- Woolsington, Tyne and Wear in England

Site information
- Owner: Air Ministry
- Operator: Royal Air Force
- Controlled by: RAF Flying Training Command

Location
- Shown within Tyne and Wear

Site history
- Built: 1939
- In use: 1939-1945

Airfield information
- Elevation: 81 metres (266 ft) AMSL
Runways
Direction	Length and surface
00/00	Grass

Royal Air Force Woolsington, or more simply RAF Woolsington, was a civilian airfield that was taken over by the RAF in 1939. It was returned to civilian use in 1946 and is now Newcastle International Airport.

== History ==
RAF Woolsington opened as a civil airport in July 1935 with a small scale military involvement from the start. An airfield close to Newcastle had first been proposed by the Air Ministry in 1929 and in 1933 suitable sites were being assessed for a runway with Town Moor also being considered. The whole of the site was requisitioned by the Royal Air Force in 1939 on the outbreak of World War II, however, 13 Group Communications Flight had been in existence at Woolsington for a month when war was declared. 43 Elementary and Reserve Flying Training School was formed in June 1939 and was disbanded just three months later in September 1939.

The base served at various times as a satellite of both RAF Acklington and RAF Ouston but saw little operational flying. However, on one notable occasion in 1940, a Spitfire of No. 72 Squadron RAF flying out of Woolsington actually shot down a Junkers Ju 88 at night. This was one of the few 'kills' at night attributed to Spitfires.

In 1941, Durham University Air Squadron (DUAS) was formed at Woolsington initially flying Tiger Moth aircraft. The unit stayed behind when all other squadrons and units were transferred out at the end of the Second World War, eventually moving on to RAF Usworth in 1949.

Woolsington's main wartime role was as the base of No. 83 Maintenance Unit which salvaged crashed aircraft over much of the region. After the war civil flying resumed and the airport is now known as Newcastle International Airport.

== Units ==
The following units or squadrons were based at (or used) RAF Woolsington between 1936 and 1946.

- No. 13 Group Communication Flight RAF
- No. 27 Gliding School RAF
- No. 43 Elementary and Reserve Flying Training School RAF
- No. 55 Operational Training Unit
- No. 62 Operational Training Unit
- No. 72 Squadron RAF
- No. 83 Maintenance Unit RAF
- No. 278 Squadron RAF
- No. 281 Squadron RAF
- Durham University Air Squadron

== See also ==
- RAF Blyton
- RAF Brize Norton
- RAF Coleby Grange
- RAF Coningsby
- RAF Cranwell
- RAF Northolt
