= Northumbrian Universities Air Squadron =

University flying squadron of the Royal Air Force

- Founded: 1941
- Country: United Kingdom
- Branch: Royal Air Force
- Role: Officer Training, Ab Initio Flying Training,
- Part of: No. 6 Flying Training School RAF
- Garrison/HQ: RAF Leeming
- Nicknames: NUAS, Free Northumbrian Air Force, Blues and Whites
- Mottos: Latin: Dat Scientia Alas "Knowledge Gives Wings"
- Aircraft: Grob Tutor T1

Commanders
- Current commander: Sqn Ldr Dave AR Hart

Northumbrian Universities Air Squadron (NUAS /nuˈæs/) is a unit of the Royal Air Force which provides basic flying training, adventurous training and personal development skills to undergraduate students of Durham University, Newcastle University, Northumbria University, Sunderland University and Teesside University. The idea behind all University Air Squadrons is to allow potential RAF officers to experience life in service and to allow them to decide whether they are suited to it. There is no obligation to join up, unless a bursary is successfully applied for. NUAS is parented by RAF Leeming where it flies Grob Tutor aircraft. NUAS Town Headquarters (THQ) are in Newcastle upon Tyne.

Training nights are held on Tuesday evenings at NUAS THQ, and are compulsory for Officer Cadets. Christmas (Freshers' Camp), Easter and Summer Training periods, each a week long, are held at RAF Leeming to further the development of members through flying, adventurous training, sport and force development.

== History ==
NUAS began life in 1941 as Durham University Air Squadron, operating Tiger Moths from RAF Woolsington (now Newcastle International Airport). It moved to RAF Ouston in 1974 and re-equipped with Chipmunk T10s. The name was changed to Northumbrian Universities Air Squadron in 1963 when Newcastle University was established, and following a move to RAF Leeming in 1974 it converted to the Bulldog TMK1.

== Affiliated Units ==
NUAS parents 11 Air Experience Flight with which it shares aircraft to allow local cadet units the chance to experience flying.

== Activities ==
The minimum commitment for UAS membership is attendance at weekly training nights during term-time, generally held in Newcastle (see Town Nights below). A whole host of other activities are available on a sign up basis to provide an insight into life in the RAF.

=== Flying ===
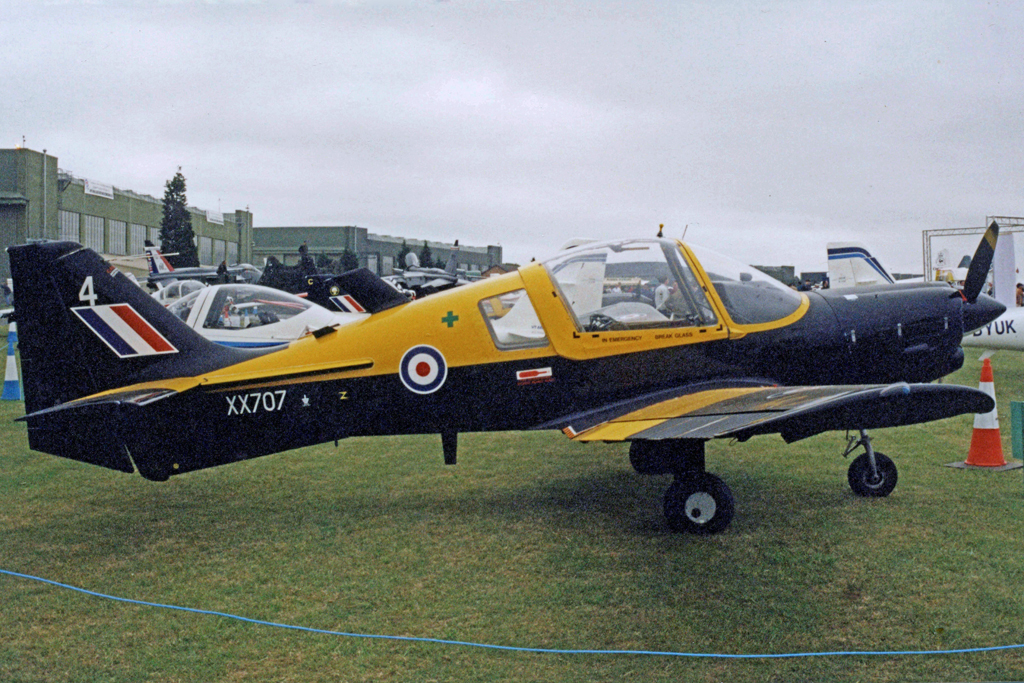
University Air Squadron Scottish Aviation Bulldog at RAF Cottesmore in 2000

Students follow a modified form of the Elementary Flying Syllabus covering the basics of flight up to solo navigation exercises. Students that complete this initial syllabus can then progress to the Advanced Flying Syllabus and learn formation flying, aerobatics, and low-level navigation skills. Each student is nominally allocated 10 hours of flying training each year, though some flyers exceed this amount.

The flying aspect of NUAS is overseen by the commanding officer (OC NUAS) and the Chief Flying Instructor (CFI), both of which are RAF Qualified Flying Instructors (QFIs). Additional Instructors are sometimes available on flying Training Periods.

All flying is based at RAF Leeming where the Grob Tutor is used as the instructional aircraft. Previous types operated were the de Havilland Chipmunk and Scottish Aviation Bulldog.

=== Adventurous Training ===
NUAS participates in many forms of adventurous training (AT), including climbing, canoeing, kayaking, mountaineering, sailing, ski touring and mountain biking. The squadron's Ground Training Instructor (GTI) facilitates many of the above activities, but most activities and exercises are organised by students - either individually, or in small groups.

NUAS relies heavily on student instructors for adventurous training (AT). Qualifications can be gained by attending a Joint Services Adventure Training (JSAT) course, which is usually free. Students attending will be taught the necessary techniques for successful and safe instruction in their chosen discipline, and can then lead others on AT.

NUAS holds an annual Ski Trip, most recently to France and then Andorra, as well as one or two other major expeditions. These expeditions have involved travelling to places such as Iceland for Mountain Biking and Corsica, where students hiked part of the G20.

=== Force Development ===
Force Development (FD) includes visits to places of historical or educational value, such as museums and cities both in the UK and abroad. Most exercises are organised by students. Previous years have seen students visit Malta, Poland, Belgium, the Netherlands and Cyprus.

=== Sports ===
NUAS takes part in many inter-UAS and inter-service competitions, and occasionally provides an RAF presence at major sporting fixtures. NUAS also participates in the RAF Leeming CO's Cup each year.

=== Charities ===
Every year NUAS students select a charity or charities to fundraise for throughout the year through student-run events. Each year a Charity Town Night is timetabled in order to raise money for a charity selected by the students.

=== Town Nights ===
These are weekly training nights which happen every Tuesday in Newcastle during term time (twice a term in Durham). A student appointed as the Town Night Exec arranges a timetable of activities throughout the academic year, covering a range of subjects from Air Power to Leadership Qualities. As mentioned, Town Nights are compulsory activities for all student members of NUAS, and written permission is required from OC NUAS if a student is unable to attend.

== Joining ==
Students can join NUAS in any year at university, provided they have five complete terms remaining on their course, and usually stay for two years, provided their attitude and commitment are good. Students from the Universities of Durham, Newcastle, Northumbria, Sunderland and Teesside may apply to join. Students who are deemed an asset may be invited to continue their careers with NUAS and stay for a further year, subject to them remaining in university and remaining committed to joining the RAF. After completing the joining process a successful student would be attested and become a member of the Volunteer Reserve in the rank of Officer Cadet.

=== Medical and Fitness ===
Once attested, students have to pass a medical and a fitness test (The Royal Air Force Fitness Test). While general good fitness will improve anyone's quality of life, NUAS requires a minimum standard in line with the RAFFT Officer standards.

=== Bursaries ===
Bursaries are available for most branches and can be applied for before joining (conferring automatic UAS membership) or after joining a UAS. The current system gives a successful candidate £6,000 over the course of their degree, more for certain branches such as Engineering or Medical. The application process consists of an interview at a career office, for UAS members and non-members respectively. If successful an invitation for selection at the OASC may follow. Successful applicants will be expected to be an example on their squadron and must join the RAF on completion of their degrees, or return all bursary monies.

== Structure ==
The commanding officer (OC NUAS) has overall responsibility, supported by the Adjutant who oversees administrative tasks and is supported by office staff at the squadron's town headquarters. The student body has a Senior Student, usually an Acting Pilot Officer (APO) who essentially heads the student body, and aside from the extra commitment organising activities, he or she acts as a liaison to the permanent staff. The Senior Student is supported by three Flight Commanders, again APOs, who oversee the three student flights and participate in the running of the squadron.

They are assisted by an executive committee which is chosen from the student body each year.

== Incidents ==
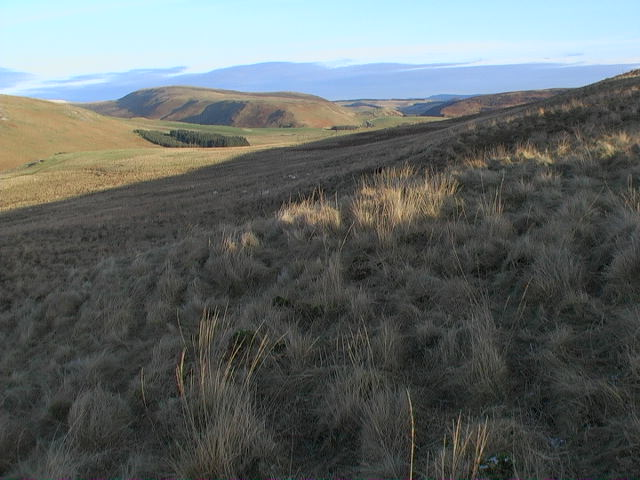
Witch Crags in 2009

On Friday 1 April 1955 at 11.20am, five (mostly-female) Durham and Newcastle University students, with an instructor, were killed on Witch Crags north of Otterburn when an aircraft 'WP780' crashed into a crowd of people. Eight were injured. The five students were killed instantly, and a sixth person, an army instructor, 26-year-old Sergeant Ewart Anthony Austin from Bideford Road in Cullercoats, died later in Hexham General Hospital.

The UAS camp was at RAF Usworth from 18 March 1955. The aircraft left RAF Usworth at 10.30am, piloted by Flt Lt Richard Vere Potts AFC, with passenger Ian Michael Hanson of Corbridge. Richard Potts, from Glaisdale Drive in Whitburn, Tyne and Wear, was a wartime fighter pilot, and served with 229 Squadron in Malta. The aircraft conducted an exercise near Linshiels Lake, and Alwinton. The aircraft banked at low level, and a wing hit the ground, the wing broke off, and the aircraft cartwheeled down a hill. The injured were taken to Hexham General Hospital. In July 1955 at RAF Usworth, 34 year old Richard Potts was court-martialled, and severely reprimanded.

The students killed were

- Margaret Nora Holwell, aged 19, from Sunderland, second year history student
- Margaret Elizabeth Gardner, aged 20, of Claremont Avenue, Roker, a third-year Languages student at what is now Newcastle University; both Margarets attended the same school, St Anthony's Girls' RC Grammar School in Sunderland
- Alan Terence Holmes, aged 21, of Osborne Road, Jesmond, final year Electrical Engineering at what is now Newcastle University
- Keith Forrester Steadman, aged 21, from 21 Rupert Road, Huyton, who attended Holt High School, a first year Electrical Engineering at what is now Newcastle University
- Pauline Therese McHaffie, aged 19, from Roman Landings in West Wittering, attended Chichester High School for Girls, at St Hilda's College, Durham

== Commanding Officers ==
- 2008 - 2012 : Sqn Ldr Lee Toomey
- 2012 - 2013 : Sqn Ldr Damon Middleton
- 2014 - 2016 : Sqn Ldr Graham Edwards
- 2016 - 2018 : Sqn Ldr Keith Dickerson
- 2018 - 2020 : Sqn Ldr Christopher Mace
- 2020 - 2024 : Sqn Ldr Julian Fowell
- 2024 - present : Sqn Ldr Dave Hart

== Alumni ==
- Flt Lt George Hobday, Natural Sciences at Durham University, Red Arrows
- Wg Cdr Jamie Norris, Northumbria University, 2013 Typhoon Display Pilot and current OC 57 Sqn

== See also ==
- University Air Squadron units
- University Royal Naval Unit, the Royal Navy equivalent
- Officers Training Corps, the British Army equivalent
- List of Royal Air Force aircraft squadrons
