= RAF Acaster Malbis =

Former Royal Air Force station in Yorkshire, England

RAF Acaster Malbis
- Acaster Malbis, North Yorkshire in England

Site information
- Type: Royal Air Force station
- Owner: Air Ministry
- Operator: Royal Air Force
- Controlled by: RAF Bomber Command

Location
- Shown within North Yorkshire RAF Acaster Malbis (the United Kingdom)
- Coordinates: 53°52′36″N 001°07′11″W

Site history
- Built: 1941
- In use: 1942 - 1957
- Battles/wars: European theatre of World War II

Airfield information
- Elevation: 8 metres (26 ft) AMSL
Runways
Direction	Length and surface
04/22	1,828 metres (5,997 ft) Concrete
11/29	1,280 metres (4,199 ft) Concrete
16/34	1,280 metres (4,199 ft) Concrete

Royal Air Force Acaster Malbis, or more simply RAF Acaster Malbis, is a former Royal Air Force station located 5.9 miles (9.5 km) south of York city centre and 5.7 miles (9.2 km) east of Tadcaster, North Yorkshire, England. It was developed from a small grass airfield at the beginning of the Second World War and its main use was as a training base for RAF Bomber Command, before being used by RAF Maintenance Command from 1944 until 1957.

== Station history ==
The airfield was originally opened as a satellite of RAF Church Fenton before No. 601 Squadron RAF arrived from RAF Duxford with Bell Airacobras staying between January and April 1942 before being re-equipped with Supermarine Spitfire VB's and moving to RAF Digby. Acaster Malbis was then used by No. 21 Group Flying Training Command as a relief landing ground for Airspeed Oxfords of No. 15 (Pilots) Advanced Flying Unit RAF ((P)AFU) from RAF Leconfield, with these leaving in January 1943.

Then surprising during 1943 the airfield was re-built to the specifications of a heavy bomber station with hard runways and spectacle dispersals being built under the control of No. 4 Group RAF of Bomber Command, however the station did not receive any aircraft before being transferred to No. 7 (Training) Group Bomber Command. During 1944 the airfield was used by Handley Page Halifaxes of 1652 and 1663 Heavy Conversion Unit. Also in 1944 the airfield was used by Armstrong Whitworth Whitleys of 1341 Special Duties Flight on radio and signal counter-measures work.

No operational flying units were based at the airfield but No. 4 Group Aircrew School (later No. 4 Aircrew School RAF) did arrive in the winter of 1944 but they moved out in October 1945 before the airfield was closed to flying during February 1946.

The airfield played host to three different maintenance units of RAF Maintenance Command with the first being No. 91 Maintenance Unit RAF (MU) which arrived during 1944 before leaving on 15 December 1947 which was replaced by a sub-site of the same unit until 31 March 1948. During this No. 80 MU moved in on 21 January 1947 using Acaster Malbis until 12 December 1947. The last maintenance unit was a sub site of No. 93 MU which arrived on 1 April 1957 and left on 1 August 1957.

== Current use ==
The site was decommissioned in 1963 and sold off but by the mid-1970s it was used by light aircraft transporting businessmen and jockeys for horse-racing season lasting until the mid-1980s.

The airfield today still has bits of the old runways and perimeter tracks with hangars and dispersals easy to spot. The site also has two small industrial estates with the first being called "Brockett Industrial Estate" and the second "Waterline Industrial Estate" due to the close distance to the River Ouse.

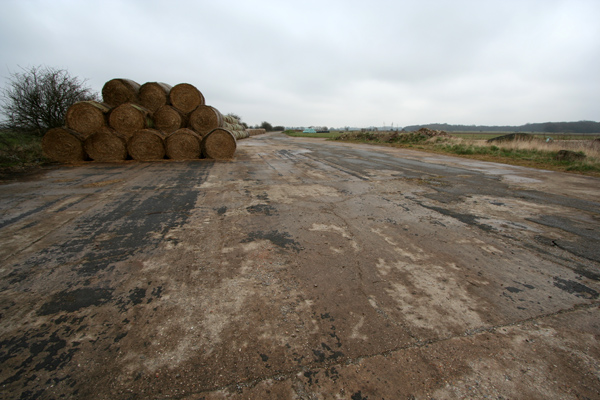
Disused peritrack at RAF Acaster Malbis

== See also ==
- List of former Royal Air Force stations
