= RAF Fauld =

Former Royal Air Force munitions storage location in Staffordshire, England

RAF Fauld
- Located near Hanbury in Staffordshire

Site information
- Type: Bomb Store
- Owner: Ministry of Defence
- Controlled by: Royal Air Force
- Open to the public: No
- Condition: Sealed

Location
- Shown within Staffordshire
- Location within Staffordshire
- Coordinates: 52.8471°N 1.7306°W

Site history
- Built: 1939
- In use: Royal Air Force 1939-1966; United States Army 1967-1973
- Battles/wars: Second World War

Royal Air Force Fauld is a former Royal Air Force underground munitions storage depot located 2 miles (3.2 km) south west of Tutbury, Staffordshire and 10.4 miles (16.7 km) north east of Rugeley, Staffordshire, England.

The site was controlled by No. 21 Maintenance Unit RAF which stored munitions underground.

The site was connected to the Stoke - Derby Railway Line and had a number of standard gauge sidings to allow for shipment of materials and munitions. These sidings closed in 1966. A 2 ft 0in gauge railway network was also present, both above and below ground. This was in use between 1939 and 1980.

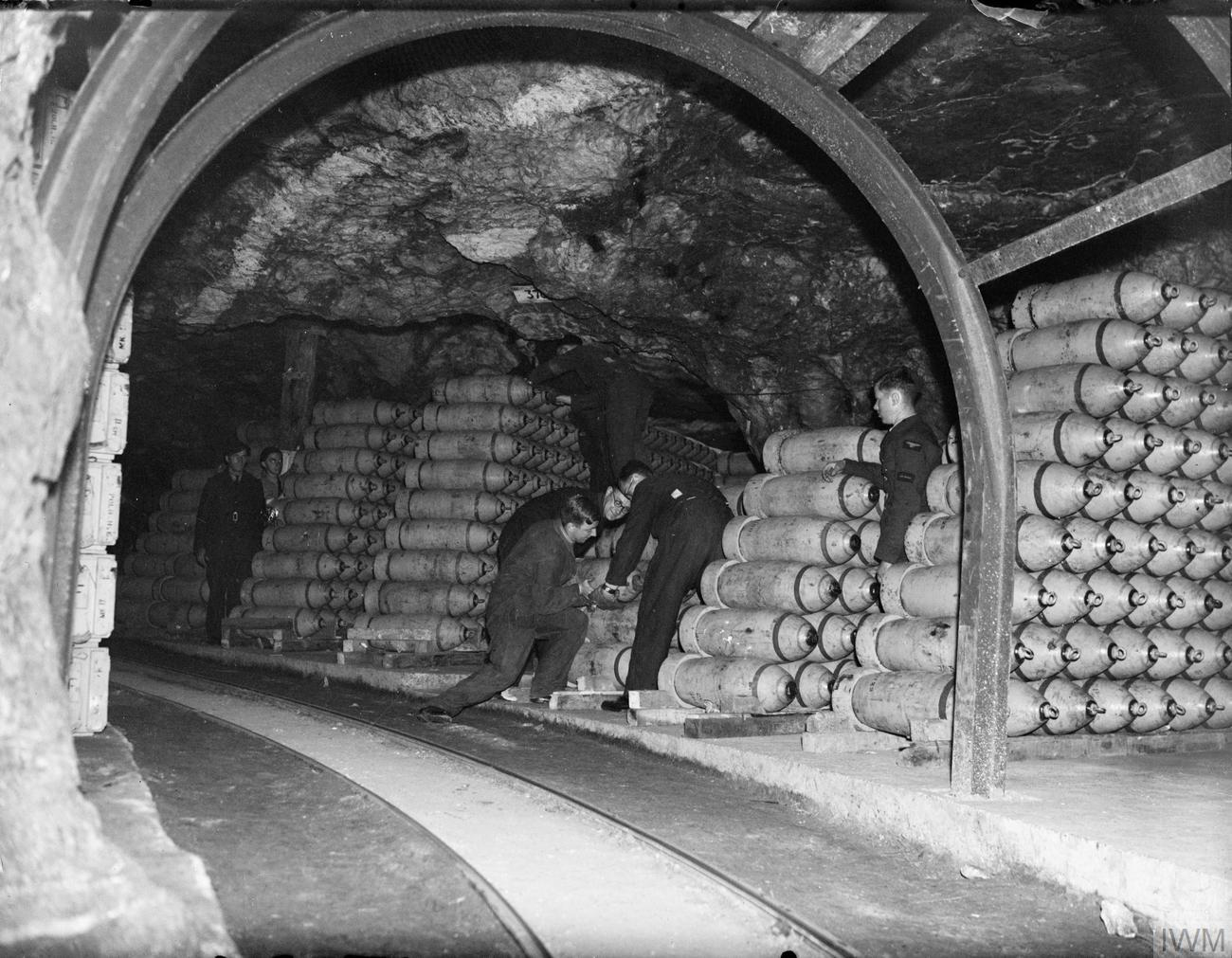
250 lb MC bombs being stacked in one of Fauld's tunnels

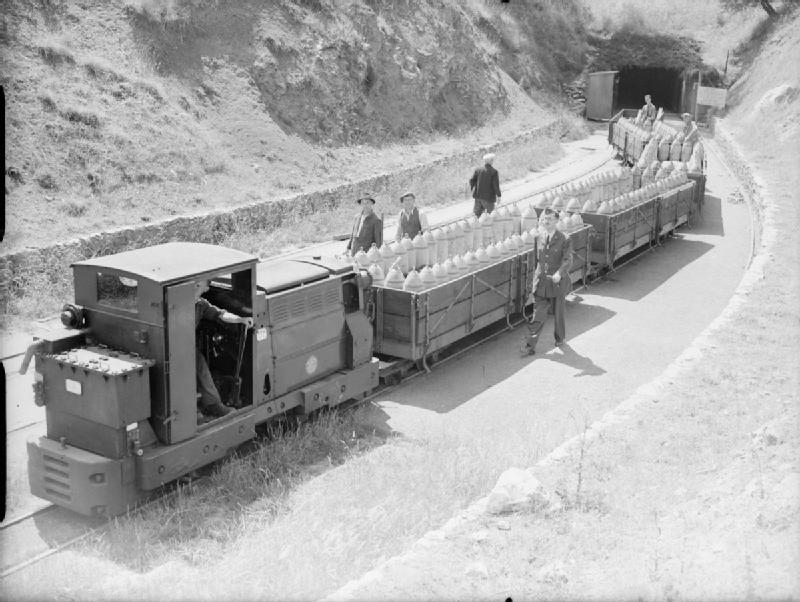
250 lb MC bombs transported by narrow gauge railway at RAF Fauld

== The explosion ==
At 11:11 am on Monday, 27 November 1944 an explosion destroyed a large part of the site and killed about 70 people.

== Post 1944 ==
The depot was used until 1966 when the site was closed. However, in late 1966 when France withdrew from NATO's integrated military structure the site was briefly used between 1967 and 1973.

== See also ==
- List of former Royal Air Force stations
