= RAF Kirkbride =

Former RAF airfield in Cumbria, England

RAF Kirkbride
- Near Kirkbride, Cumbria in England
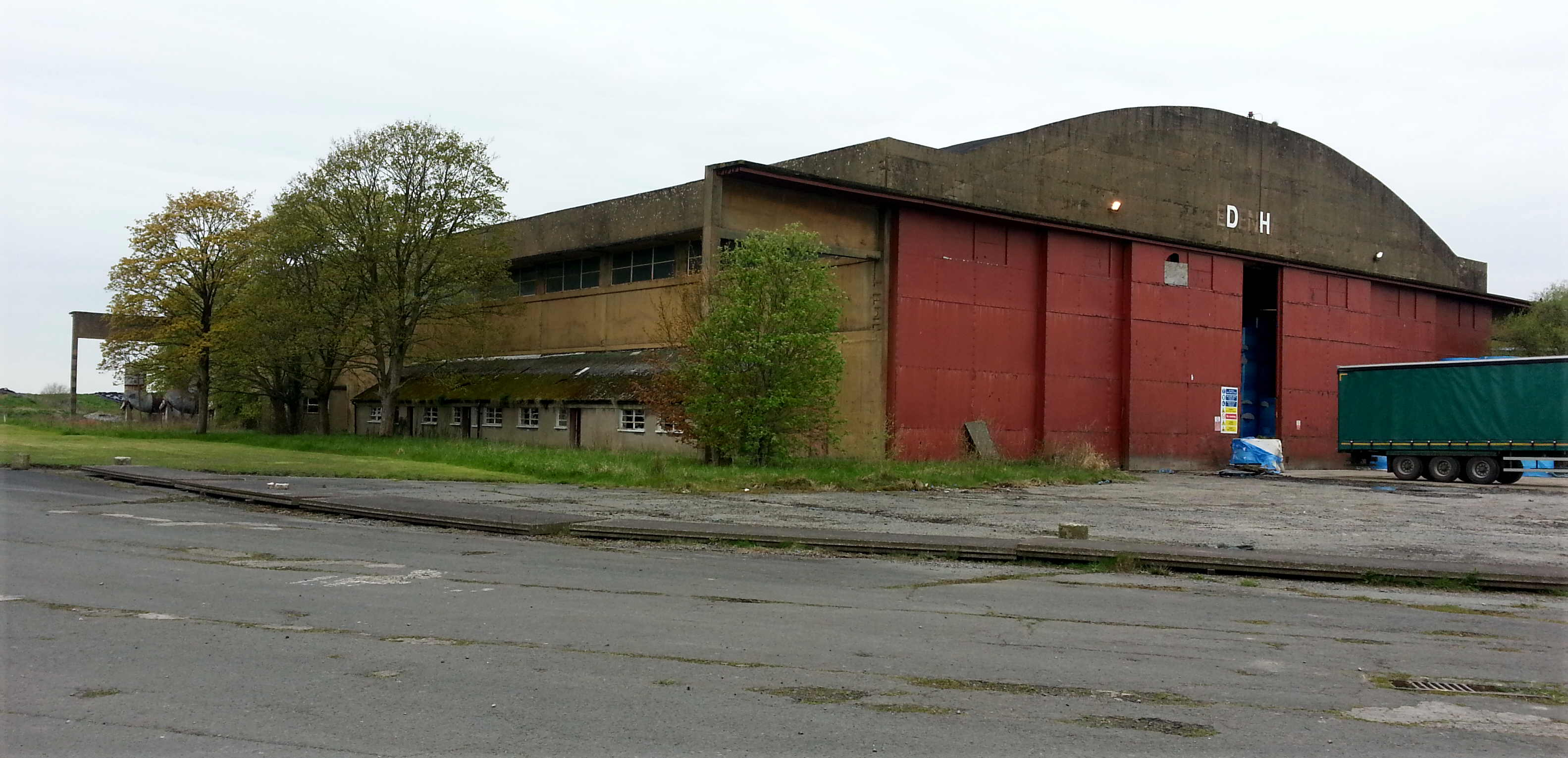
- Hangar RAF Kirkbride

Site information
- Type: Royal Air Force station
- Owner: Air Ministry
- Operator: Royal Air Force
- Controlled by: RAF Maintenance Command
- Open to the public: Yes

Location
- Shown within Cumbria RAF Kirkbride (the United Kingdom)
- Coordinates: 54.882°N 3.204°W
- Grid reference: NY228548

Site history
- Built: 1938–1939
- In use: 1939–1960
- Fate: Disposed of; private ownership

Airfield information
- Identifiers: ICAO: EGZF
Runways
Direction	Length and surface
	1,400 yards (1,280 m) (Note: The dimensions are for the airfield when open at the start of the Second World War. The main runway is listed as now being 4,045 feet (1,233 m).)
10/28	1,250 yards (1,143 m)
	1,000 yards (914 m)

Royal Air Force Kirkbride or more simply RAF Kirkbride is a former Royal Air Force Second World War era airfield in the village of Kirkbride, Cumbria, England. Opened in June 1939, the base was intended to be an aircraft repair depot, as its location was deemed to be far enough away from the threat of enemy aircraft. After the Second World War, the site remained open as a maintenance unit and a disposal airfield for redundant aircraft. It was closed in 1960.

== History ==
The site was acquired in 1937, and intended to be operational by December 1939, however, this was brought forward six months, and the airbase was operating by June 1939. Building work continued post-opening, with the first hangar not being completed until the end of July 1939. In the planning stage, the airfield was intended to be an ASU (aircraft storage unit), rather than an ARD (aircraft repair depot), which is what it became with the work of No. 12 MU. The first aircraft arrived by rail, as the runway was not ready until the autumn of 1939. The station was provided with 15 hangars at the outset; one type-C, four type-D hangars, six type-E, and four type-L. Historic England states that at the closure of the base in 1960, the site had expanded to include 38 hangars in total. The runways were not long enough, a Liberator had trouble making an effective landing in 1941, and so approval was given to lengthen the runways, but this was not completed until 1943.

Most of the pilots operating out of the base were part of the Air Transport Auxiliary; one of whom described a particularly clever attack a by a Luftwaffe pilot flying a Messerschmitt Bf 110, which looked like a Hampden. The aircraft lowered its landing gear and waggled its wings to mimic the procedures used by ATA pilots when they coming in to land. The bomber then applied thrust and strafed the base dropping at least three bombs on Kirkbride.

No. 12 Maintenance Unit remained at the base for the duration of Kirkbride's RAF existence. 12 MU's motto was Nunquam intermittere cursum (Latin: Never to break flight). By the summer of 1945, when offensive operations by the air forces in Europe were winding down, the nature of the base changed from a servicing unit to that of a storage unit. In July 1945, the number of aircraft stored at Kirkbride was 930, which had risen to 1,206 stored airframes by November of the same year.

An inquiry during a session of Parliament in 1958, revealed that during the 1955–1956 financial year, over £100,000 (equivalent to £2,166,179 in 2025) was spent on repairing aircraft at the base.

== Post closure ==
The RAF abandoned the site in 1960, but it was considered as a possible ground station for the American MIDAS system, though in the eventuality, it was never used. The plan was that it would remain under RAF control, initially stated to be part of Fighter Command, and furnished with three radomes each about 100 feet (30 m) in diameter, (similar to the initial equipment at RAF Fylingdales).

The site is part of the Solway Military Trail, which details access to parts of the site via existing footpaths. The former officers mess building has been converted into a hotel, and most of the hangars are now used for agricultural purposes.

As an aerodrome, it remains open to light and recreational aviation, with 1,280 metres (4,200 ft) of hard runway available.

== Units ==
- No. 1 (Coastal) Operational Training Unit RAF - 1940 to 1943. The OTU was based at nearby RAF Silloth, but routinely used Kirkbride for training flights.
- No. 12 Maintenance Unit (41 Maintenance Command) - 5 June 1939 to 30 June 1960.
- No. 16 Ferry Pilots Pool (Air Transport Auxiliary) - July 1941 to September 1945.
