= Bent Rigg radar station =

Former Royal Air Force radar site in North Yorkshire, England

Bent Rigg Radar Station
- Ravenscar, North Yorkshire in England
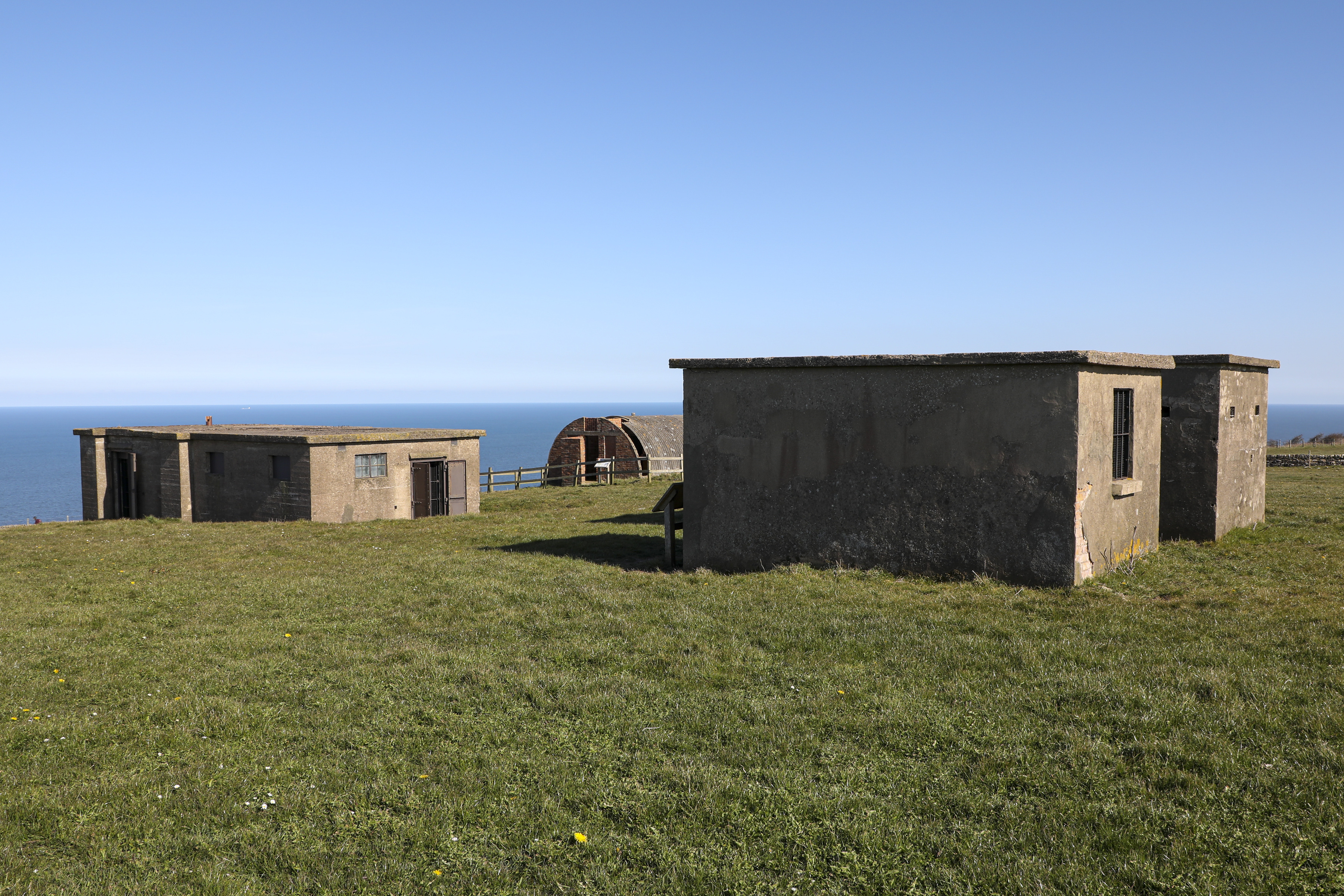
- Bent Rigg radar site looking east

Site information
- Type: Radar site
- Owner: Air Ministry
- Operator: Royal Air Force
- Controlled by: 73 (Signals) Wing RAF
- Open to the public: Yes

Location
- Coordinates: 54.393°N 0.474°W
- Grid reference: NZ991008

Site history
- Built: (1938) 1940–1941
- In use: 1941–1944 (assumed)
- Materials: Concrete
- Fate: Abandoned - domestic site demolished

Garrison information
- Designations: Scheduled monument

Bent Rigg Radar Station, also known as Royal Air Force Ravenscar, and Ravenscar tracking station, (Note: RAF bases in the Second World War era usually took a name that could not be confused with elsewhere, and this would normally be from the parish that the station headquarters were located in. Bent Rigg is in the parish of Staintondale, but was sometimes referred to as RAF Ravenscar.) was a radar site located at Bent Rigg, 0.6 miles (1 km) south of Ravenscar, North Yorkshire, England. Several radar stations had been located in the Ravenscar area since 1938, but a more permanent site was built at Bent Rigg in 1941, which was crewed by technicians and other staff from the Royal Air Force. Bent Rigg and the wider location around Ravenscar were deemed "attractive" for the siting of long-range finding equipment. It was originally part of the Coastal Defence/Chain Home Low (CD/CHL) system, designed to detect shipping. Later, it was upgraded with more powerful equipment as part of the Chain Home Extra Low (CHEL). The last recorded use of the station was in September 1944, and it is believed that the site closed soon afterwards.

A few structures remain at the site, with the foundations of the accommodation blocks still extant near an abandoned railway line to the west. The site is open to the public, being located next to the Cleveland Way, and the National Trust has erected information boards detailing the buildings and the history of the site.

== History ==
The proposal to site a radar at Ravenscar was first mooted in 1937, when a party from the Directorate of Works, and representatives from Bawdsey, assessed at least ten locations from the Isle of Wight to Berwick-upon-Tweed. Ravenscar and a site near Bridlington were assessed but later dropped in favour of Danby Beacon and Staxton Wold. However, in 1938, a radar site was constructed near to Bent Rigg, 0.6 miles (1 km) south of Ravenscar, to provide temporary radar cover after the Munich Crisis of 1938. The Air Ministry was "galvanised" to complete the radar programme ahead of schedule, and so the mobile radars that were stored at Bawdsey for deployment overseas, were pressed into action at Ravenscar and other key locations. The equipment did not last very long at Ravenscar, being donated in spring 1939 to an accelerated site at Netherbutton in the Orkney Islands. With Ottercops Moss in Northumberland now active and covering the Tyneside area, the equipment at Bent Rigg/Ravenscar was dismantled on 1 May 1939, and taken up to Rosyth for shipping to Orkney.

By September 1939, Ravenscar had been re-equipped, and was manned initially by members of the 29th Coast Observer Detachment (part of the 526th Durham Coast Regiment). It was later due to receive some 90-foot (27 m) towers as part of the "Intermediate Chain Home" (ICH) programme, albeit still with the Ravenscar site being temporary, but the location was ideal for the siting of radar. Richardson and Dennison labelled the site "attractive" for the siting of long-range detecting devices, as it occupied "..a broad, visible sweep of the horizon.. [and] an elevated position". It fulfilled the requirements of a radar site as stated by Bragg in the book "RDF 1 : the location of aircraft by radio methods 1935-1945":

The greater the station height, the greater the range at which approaching aircraft can be detected and roughly located. The smoother the fall of the land over the radius a few miles in front of, and to the flanks of the site, the more accurate the height finding and direction finding.

Work on the site began in late 1940, and by October 1941, along with the Dronehill and West Beckham sites, Bent Rigg was commissioned as an ACH (Advanced Chain Home) location, with at least four permanent structures on the technical site. Its original designation was station M47; however, when it was upgraded to the Chain Home Extra Low system, it was labelled as K47. As M47, it was one of five sites along the Yorkshire coast in the Coastal Defence/Chain Home Low (CD/CHL) system. (Note: These were located at (north to south) Saltburn, Goldsborough, Ravenscar, Skipsea and Grimston) From March 1941, the site was equipped with a static Type 2 radar, which by the time it had been classified as station M47, the radar had a wavelength of 1.5 metres (4 ft 11 in). The re-designation as station K47 under the CHEL system, saw it equipped with a centimetric Type 52 radar.

Improvements in radar technology meant that enhanced stations had the ability to scan further and wider, resulting in the need for fewer stations. As part of the Chain Home Extra Low system, Bent Rigg was one of three on the Yorkshire coast, and the only one on its original site, the other two being Saltburn (on a different site to the "M" station), and Flamborough Head (a new site called RAF Bempton). Between each of these stations, the distance was only 37 miles (59 km) - Bempton to Ravenscar 19 miles (30 km), and Ravenscar to Saltburn was 18 miles (29 km).

The technical (operational) site was built on the cliff edge with "a commanding view of the sea", and covered an area no bigger than 980 feet (300 m) by 520 feet (160 m), but the domestic site was further inland, close to the railway line between Whitby and Scarborough. Whilst the railway line was open when the radar station was in use, supplies and personnel may have been carried by the railway, although no platform was built at the site, with railway station at Ravenscar being the nearest railhead. The distance between the accommodation site and the technical site was 200 metres (660 ft), but archaeological surveys have not uncovered any evidence of pathways linking the two. At other radar sites built around the same time, and to the same specifications (such as Craster and Goldsborough), pathways marked by upright stones were evident, which was thought to allow workers to navigate the site during a blackout.

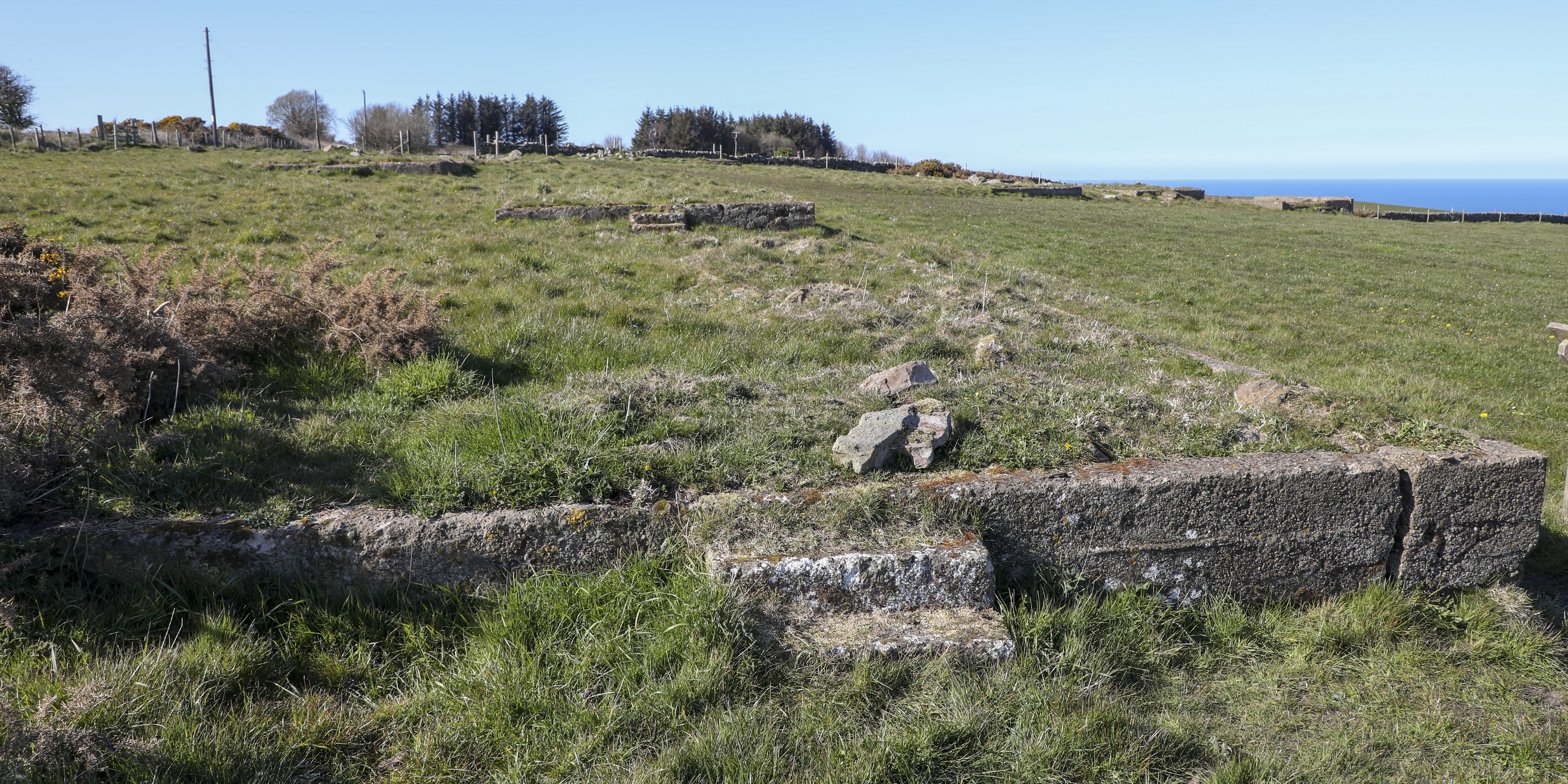
Remains of accommodation site at Bent Rigg

A revamped Ravenscar proved to be one of the most useful early detection sites, it could recognise aircraft at 10,000 feet (3,000 m) at a range of 80 miles (130 km); this gave Newcastle and Middlesbrough a 30-minute warning. A similar site at Coldingham in Berwickshire (RAF Dronehill), could only detect at 7,000 feet (2,100 m) and a range of 60 miles (97 km), giving Edinburgh a 20-minute warning. It was later staffed by communications technicians from the Royal Air Force c. 1943, becoming known in Air Force documents as RAF Ravenscar, which was part of No. 73 (Signals) Wing RAF, which had their headquarters in Malton, North Yorkshire.

Whilst it is not exactly certain, it is believed that the site was closed sometime soon after September 1944, when it was last recorded in use. (Note: Under the "Defence of Britain Project", which collected data and assessed the site (among many others) between 1995 and 2001, it was found that hardly any records of the site had survived in the National Archives.) What remains of the permanent structures is the communications hut, engine house, fuel store and the transmitter/receiver block, which are part of the scheduled designation. The coastguard tower on the cliff edge, and a fifth building on the southern edge of the site, are not part of the scheduled monument. Another platform exists to the north east of the TX/Rx block which housed a structure measuring 9 feet 8 inches (2.95 m) by 8 feet 10 inches (2.7 m). It is uncertain what function this building was required for. The domestic accommodation was demolished in the latter part of the 1940s, but the foundations are still visible on the west side of the field bordering the former railway line. The site was labelled with many names; those who served there from the RAF referred to the site as RAF Ravenscar. Other names are Bent Rigg, which is the most common, and Radio Tracking Station Ravenscar.

== Buildings ==
The site at Ravenscar is now on National Trust land, (Note: The Yorkshire coast from Saltburn to Filey came under the protection of the National Trust in 1976. The National Trust acquired the land around Bent Rigg Farm and the former radar site (96 acres (39 ha)) between 1985 and 1988.) and along with RAF Bempton further down the Yorkshire coast, is one of six radar sites across England with a preservation order, or scheduled monument designation. The site at Ravenscar is said to be the best example of a World War Two radar station along the coastline of Yorkshire and the north east. Four structures at the technical site remain near to the cliff edge, which is accessible to the public either from the Cleveland Way, or from the Cinder Path, which is the former trackbed of the Scarborough and Whitby Railway line. Three of the extant buildings are of a concrete construction, whilst the fourth is a Nissen hut. Whilst it is recorded that the technical area was functioning by February 1942, the Nissen Hut must be a later addition as that type of hut did not go into production until May 1942. A fifth building, on the southern edge of the field, is believed to have been involved with the main power supply. It is not in the official scheduled designation.

The National Trust have designated the buildings as follows:

The layout at Bent Rigg. Not to scale and is representational only.

Building	Description	Ref
Fuel store	A single storey, single-celled building with a flat concrete roof and cement rendering. Holes in the wall, and brick supports on the north side indicate where a fuel tank was previously attached to the side of the building.	
Engine House	A single storey, single-cell building with a flat concrete roof. Reinforced concrete construction. Supplied power to the site.	
Communications hut	(Nissen Hut) images show this to be the main radar room with a dish attached on top of the building. The building is divided into three rooms and has fixtures and fittings for equipment set into the wall. As befits a Nissen Hut, the roof is a curved, corrugated asbestos structure.	
Tx/Rx block	(Transmitter/Receiver) reinforced concrete structure, set further down the slope of the hill to the other three buildings. The blast doors and shutters are still attached. The ladder giving access to the roof was in still in place in the year 2000. The building is identical to one built at Craster in Northumberland. The shutters on the windows and doors are present (unlike at Craster), which suggests the possibility of an aerial attack.	

Archaeological surveys of the area have determined that the domestic accommodation, mess hall and offices, which numbered ten buildings, were 200 metres (660 ft) to the south west of the technical site, but these have been removed/demolished. The site had washroom and toilet facilities some 40 metres (130 ft) north of the domestic accommodation.

== See also ==
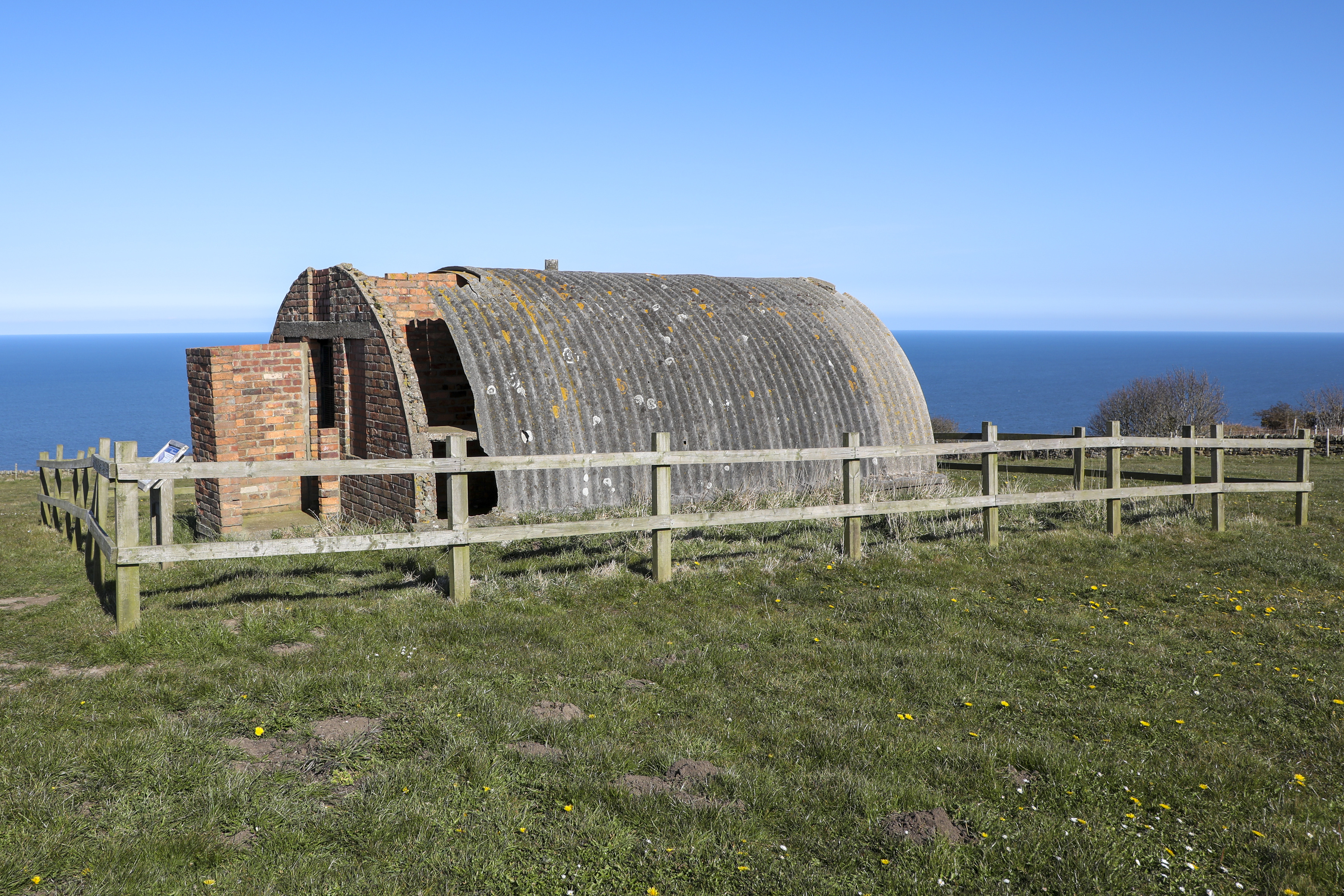
The communications hut at Bent Rigg

- RAF Bempton
- RAF Danby Beacon
- RAF Goldsborough
- RAF Holmpton
- RAF Oxenhope Moor
- RRH Staxton Wold
