= Craster radar station =

Former Royal Air Force radar site in Northumberland, England

- Craster, Northumberland in England
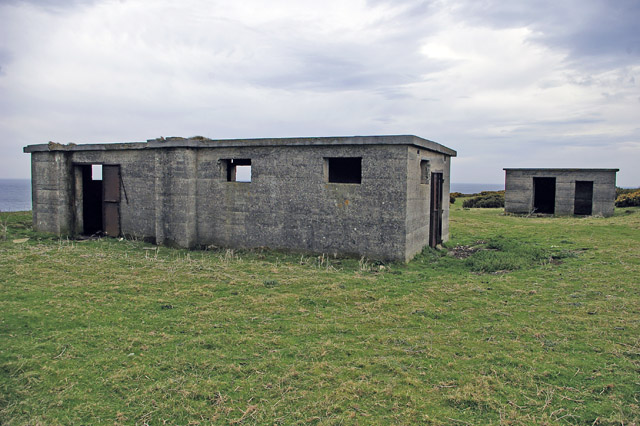
- Buildings at Craster radar station

Site information
- Type: Radar station
- Code: M28/K28
- Controlled by: RAF
- Open to the public: Yes

Location
- Coordinates: 55.476°N 1.598°W
- Grid reference: NU254203
- Height: 50 metres (160 ft)

Site history
- Built: 1942
- In use: 1944
- Fate: Partially demolished
- Events: Second World War

Craster radar station (also known as RAF Craster), was a Chain Home Low (later a Chain Home Extra Low) Second World War radar site at Craster in Northumberland, England. The radar site is north of the village of Craster on an escarpment overlooking the North Sea. The site was opened by early 1942 and was staffed initially by the British Army, but later came under the control of No. 73 Wing of the Royal Air Force, part of No. 60 Group. It closed in 1944 and was later used as a PoW camp.

== History ==
At the time of the Munich crisis in October 1938, Britain had eleven radar sites, which were mostly located on the eastern coast. The concern over the rise of Nazi Germany prompted a wider development of the radar system. The site at Craster was built in 1941 and opened in April 1942 under the auspices of the British Army's chain of radar stations, operating as a Coastal Defence/Chain Home Low station (CD/CHL). It was built on an escarpment some 150 metres (490 ft) from the shoreline and 50 metres (160 ft) above sea level. The escarpment is an outcrop of Whin Sill which has a gentle slope towards the sea, giving the radar station an "..uninterrupted sweep of the coast from a relatively elevated position." The prefix of M at Craster (its code was M28), signified that it was initially equipped with a 1.5-metre (4 ft 11 in) radar.

The site was handed over to the Royal Air Force c. 1942, and was staffed by communications personnel drawn from No. 73 Wing (part of No 60 Group RAF), who had their headquarters in Malton, North Yorkshire. By 1944, Craster had become a Chain Home Extra Low site.

After closure as a radar station, the site was used briefly as a PoW camp.

== Buildings ==
Two buildings remain on the site, the former transmit/receive block (TxRx) and the standby set house. The standby set house was used to provide emergency power to the TxRx block in case of electricity supply issues. The buildings are now maintained by the National Trust and are recorded as 10355 / MNA124708. Both buildings are 3 metres (9.8 ft) high and the site is listed as grade II with Historic England. The TxRx building was a set design, measuring 50 feet (15 m) by 18 feet (5.5 m) upon which was mounted an aerial which could turn continuously. The footprint of the radar base including the TxRx, standby set house and accommodation buildings, covered an area of 230 metres (750 ft) by 170 metres (560 ft).

== See also ==
- Bent Rigg radar station
- Cresswell radar station
