= RRH Staxton Wold =

Royal Air Force base in North Yorkshire, England

RRH Staxton Wold
- Near Scarborough, North Yorkshire in England
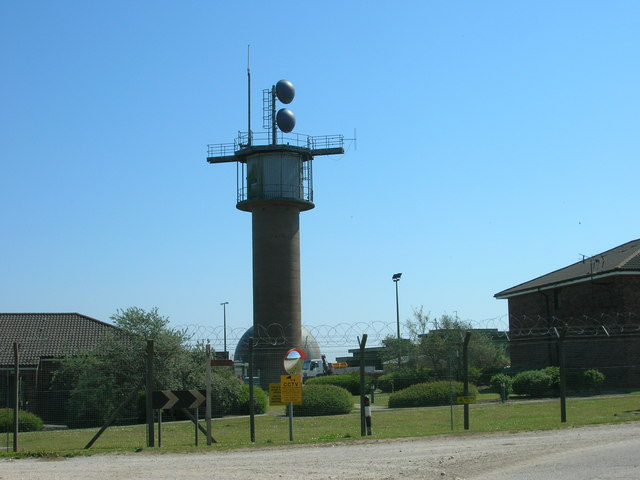
- RAF Staxton Wold

- Vigilamus et Defendimus (Latin for 'We Watch and We Ward')

Site information
- Type: Remote Radar Head
- Owner: Ministry of Defence
- Operator: Royal Air Force
- Controlled by: Air Command and Control Force
- Condition: Operational
- Radar type: Indra Sistemas LTR-25 Deployable Air Defence Radar (DADR)

Location
- Shown within North Yorkshire
- Coordinates: 54°11′11″N 000°26′04″W
- Area: 13 hectares (32 acres)
- Height: 574 feet (175 m)

Site history
- Built: 1936
- In use: 1937 – present

Garrison information
- Occupants: Radar Flight (South)

Remote Radar Head Staxton Wold or RRH Staxton Wold is an air defence radar station operated by the Royal Air Force, located near Scarborough in North Yorkshire, England. As it has been a radar site continuously since 1939, it has a claim to be the oldest working radar station in the world. The base has undergone many upgrades of different radar systems and sits on top of Staxton Wold at a height of 590 feet (180 m) above sea level.

== History ==
The present-day site of RRH Staxton Wold has had an early warning function since the 3rd century AD, when it was the site of a warning beacon. It was first selected to be used as a radar station in 1937, when it was set up as part of the Chain Home system, being some 590 feet (180 m) above sea level and only 4 miles (6.4 km) inland of the Yorkshire Coast. Building work did not begin until December 1938 as delays in procuring the site occurred when the landowners resisted selling (this being before the Second World War, so the government found it harder to demand the land by force for the war effort).

The site became fully operational in April 1939 and is the only one of the original stations still in use, and may thus claim to be the oldest continuously serving radar station. Just before the outbreak of war (July 1939), the base was equipped with a Bofors anti-aircraft gun, and by December 1939, it was only one of two operational radar stations in Yorkshire (the other being Danby Beacon). For six weeks during late 1939, Sir Bernard Lovell was posted to Staxton Wold from the University of Manchester whilst assessing radar at the site. Operations at the base were wound down in 1945 when the Second World War came to an end, with the site being put under a care and maintenance basis. It was partially reactivated in 1951 for training, and then in 1953 a GEE H radar was installed at the site.

Maintenance and operating staff were drawn from No. 73 Wing RAF, part of No. 60 Group RAF, with administrative and other human necessities catered for (parented in RAF Terms) by RAF Church Fenton. In the 1990s, the station was maintained and operated by No. 129 Signals Unit, and was part of Sector 2 headquartered by RAF Neatishead, which covered the southern half of the United Kingdom. During the 1950s, 1960s and 1970s, when the station was in use, staff were billeted at RAF Leconfield, Alamein Barracks (the former RAF Driffield), RAF Bempton, and civilian housing requisitioned in Scarborough.

In the 1950s, with the threat of aerial bombardment on the station, the RAF installed service fire-fighters at the base, who would tackle fires until North Yorkshire Fire and Rescue Service (NYF&RS) would arrive to assist. In the 1980s, the RAF fire-fighters were asked to attend local incidents in their area until the NYF&RS arrived to take control. However, by the early 21st century, the base was largely automated and the fire-fighters were removed from Staxton Wold.

During the late 1950s, all of the original Chain Home buildings were demolished in preparation for the new radar installation (originally labelled as 'Plan Ahead', but which by the early 1960s had developed into the Linesman project). In April 1980, the station was an attack target in Exercise Elder Forest 80, which involved 1,500 NATO aircraft testing the air defences of the RAF's early warning and radar network. In July 1990 the Type 85 radar was decommissioned after 23 years of use, it was replaced by the Type 93.

Today it is a Remote Radar Head (RRH) within the United Kingdom Air Surveillance and Control System (UKASACS). The radar at Staxton Wold after the Type 93 was decommissioned was a Lockheed Martin AN/TPS-77 radar which was due to be working by September 2013, but only became fully operational in early 2015. In September 2017, it was reported that the TPS-77 at Staxton Wold would be transferred to RRH Saxa Vord. A new radar, the INDRA LTR-25, has now taken the TPS-77's place within a new radome.

As part of a major upgrade of RRH sites around the U.K. the MOD began a programme titled HYDRA in 2020 to install new state-of-the-art communications buildings, radar towers and bespoke perimeter security.

== Notable personnel ==
- Bernard Lovell (1939)
- Eric Eastwood (1942)

== See also ==
- Improved United Kingdom Air Defence Ground Environment – UK air defence radar system in the UK between the 1990s and 2000s
- Linesman/Mediator – UK air defence radar system in the UK between the 1960s and 1984
- List of Royal Air Force stations
- NATO Integrated Air Defense System
