= Yorkshire Coast =

Coastline of Yorkshire, England

Coordinates: 54.1515°N 0.1740°W

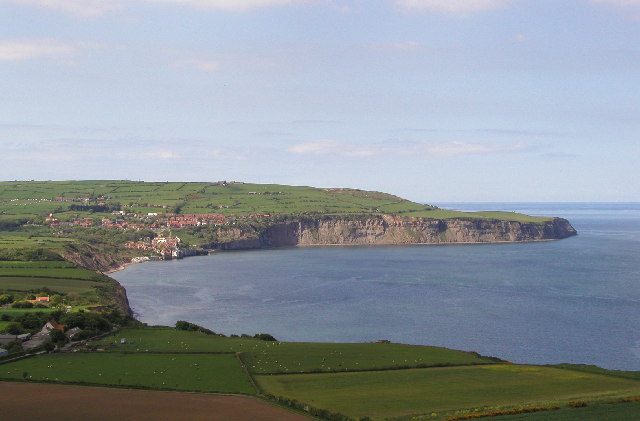
Robin Hoods Bay viewed from the south

The Yorkshire Coast runs from the Tees estuary to the Humber estuary, on the east coast of England. The cliffs at Boulby are the highest on the east coast of England, rising to 660 feet (200 m) above the sea level.

The North York Moors National Park extends up to the coastline and traverses 26 miles (42 km) of it between Boulby and Cloughton, taking in the historic fishing villages of Staithes, Runswick Bay and Robin Hood's Bay.

The section of coastline south of Bridlington to Spurn Head is also known as the Holderness coast, from the area of East Yorkshire it adjoins.

In 2016, Natural England announced the creation of a coastal path between Filey Brigg and Newport (Middlesbrough) Transporter Bridge. This will eventually link up with paths all around the coastline of England to become the England Coast Path. The section from Filey to Saltburn is in use as part of the Cleveland Way.

The coastline between the two estuaries was historically made up of the East and North Ridings of Yorkshire. From 1974 to 1996, the coast consisted administratively of Cleveland's Langbaurgh district, North Yorkshire and Humberside. Since 1996, the area has been governed by Redcar and Cleveland, North Yorkshire and East Riding of Yorkshire councils.

== Settlements ==
Whitby

The following is a list of settlements on the Yorkshire coast from north to south. The italicised places are notable coastal points.

- Redcar
- Marske
- Saltburn
- Skinningrove
- Boulby
- Staithes
- Port Mulgrave
- Runswick Bay
- Kettleness
- Sandsend
- Whitby
- Robin Hood's Bay
- Ravenscar
- Scarborough
- Cayton
- Filey
- Reighton
- Flamborough Head
- Bridlington
- Skipsea
- Hornsea
- Mappleton
- Withernsea
- Easington
- Spurn Head

== Heritage coast ==
The Yorkshire coast is home to three of thirty-two nationally designated Heritage Coasts in England and Wales. The Heritage Coasts are so designated for their exceptional or very good scenic quality. The three sections on the Yorkshire coastline are (from north to south);

Name	From	To	Length	Designated
North Yorkshire & Cleveland	Saltburn-by-the-Sea	Scalby	36 miles (58 km)	May 1981
Spurn	Easington	Kilnsea	12 miles (19 km)	October 1988
Flamborough Headland	Reighton	Sewerby	12 miles (19 km)	August 1989

The Heritage Coasts are designated by Natural England with the purpose of protecting the coastline, its environment and heritage. Part of the designation is the provision of a coastal footpath along the length of the Heritage Coast. The northernmost Heritage Coast has a footpath alongside its entire length (the seaward side of the Cleveland Way). The North Yorkshire and Cleveland Heritage Coast designation does not include the coastal section around Whitby (Upgang Chine to Abbey Field) as it has been built on and developed.

== Geology ==
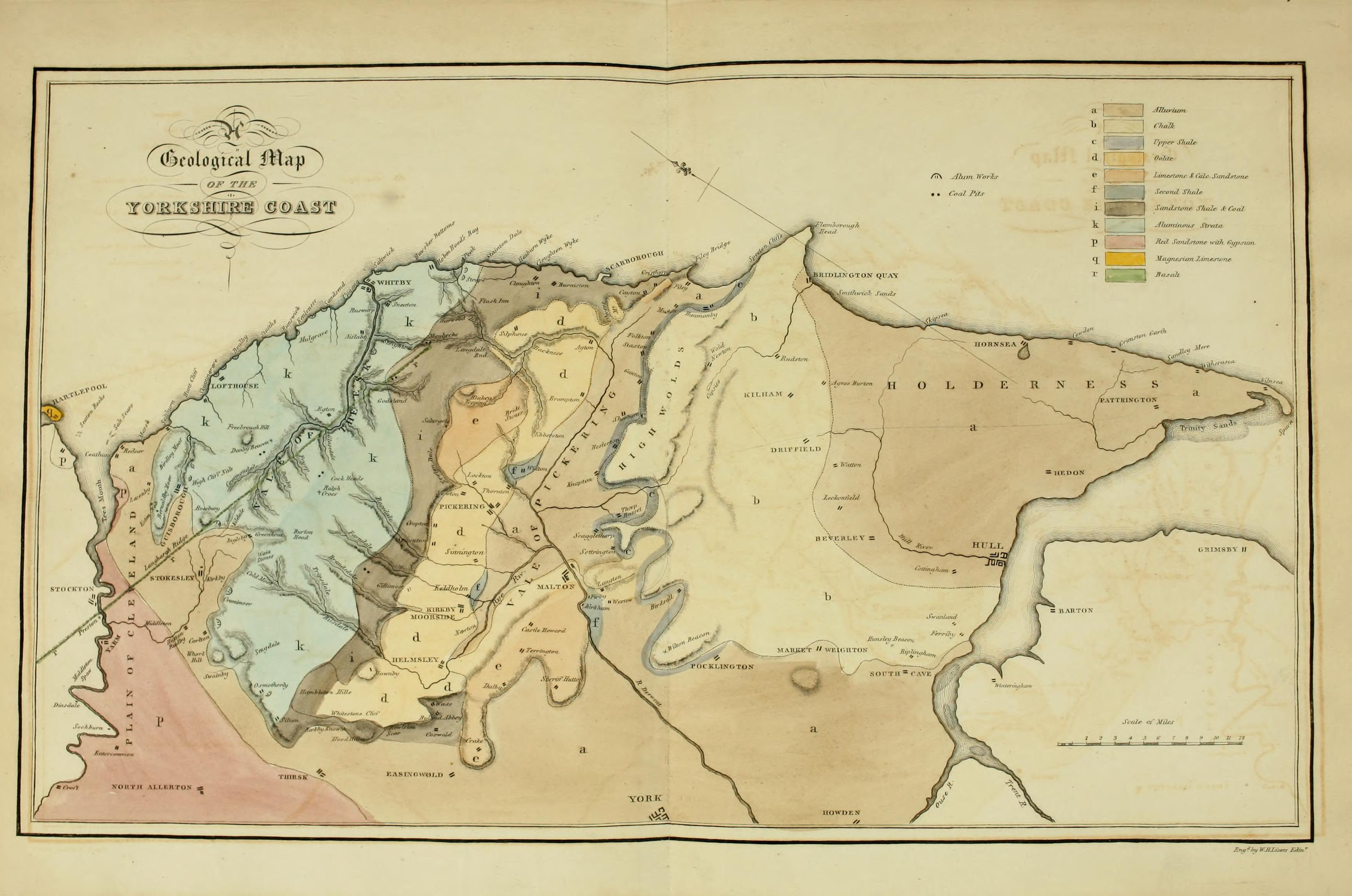
A geological map of the Yorkshire coast. North is orientated to the left top corner of the image. This means that the mouth of the Tees is on the left and the mouth of the Humber on the right

As can be seen from the geological map, the Yorkshire Coast is composed of shales, alluviums (sand, clay and gravel), oolites, limestones, mudstone, sandstones, ironstones and chalk. Typically, boulder clay is the section alongside the North Sea in the East Riding of Yorkshire and has been the most prone to coastal erosion. The Lost Towns of the Yorkshire Coast by Thomas Sheppard lists 30 settlements that were lost by the time his book was published in 1912.

Kilnsea Parish Church was destroyed by coastal erosion in 1830. It had been noted that the sea was eating away at the coastline before the last burial in 1823. In 1824, services in the church were stopped and 6 years later, the church and many of the dwellings around it had been lost.

Erosion rates are now averaging 11 feet (3.5 m) per year on the sections between Hornsea and Mappleton and from Withernsea to the south. Many towns along the coast have installed defences to stop the sea claiming the land, but in some areas, the sea is taking the land and oftentimes is depositing it further down on Spurn Head.

Both Withernsea and Whitby have used Norwegian rocks as sea defences. The Shoreline Management Plan 2, which covers the coastline from the Tyne to Flamborough Head admits that whilst towns such as Filey, Scarborough and Whitby should be protected, other settlements such as Robin Hood's Bay will see properties lost to coastal erosion. Robin Hood's Bay had concrete sea walls installed alongside its shoreline in 1973, but a report issued in 2014 stated that the structure was coming to the end of its design life.

This stretch of coastline is also famous for the collapse of the Holbeck Hall Hotel near to Scarborough in 1993. After a prolonged rainfall, water had seeped into the earth which destabilised the ground underneath the hotel causing a landslide. Television cameras managed to capture the building falling onto the shoreline below.

=== Whitby Jet ===
Part of the coastal geological make-up in North Yorkshire is Whitby Jet. Jet is a hard Lignite mineraloid that was wood from Monkey Puzzle and Chilean Pine trees laid down 185 million years ago in the Jurassic era. Jet is found on the beaches in the area and its popularity during the 19th century was down to Queen Victoria who wore Jet jewelry as part of her mourning dress for Prince Albert.

=== Petrified forest ===
A 7,000-year old petrified forest stretches along the coastline south from Hartlepool and along Redcar Beach. It was first discovered in 1871 when wild boar tusks and deer antlers were found in the sand. Storms in March 2018 revealed the extent of the ancient forest with petrified tree stumps being exposed to the open air on Redcar Beach when a combination of the storm and low tides removed all the sand from the beach.

=== Dinosaur Coast ===
The coastline in Yorkshire is home to some of the world's best Jurassic and Cretaceous geology which has given it the nickname of the Dinosaur Coast. Fossils can easily be found on the beaches at Whitby, Staithes and Runswick Bay with Britain's oldest dinosaur bone being found on Whitby beach in 2015. The bone fell out of a cliff face and after detailed analysis was found to be 176 million years old. A fossilized footprint of what was described as a 'Jurassic giant', and belonging to a meat eating dinosaur (possibly a Megalosaurus), was discovered in April 2021. The fossil dates the dinosaur to living around 175 to 164 million years ago.

=== Spurn Point ===
Spurn is a peninsula that extends southwards from the south eastern edge of Holderness. It is 3.5 miles (5.6 km) long and in places is only 160 feet (50 m) wide. It is continually being eroded by the sea and also becomes a dumping ground for sand, pebbles and rocks washed down from further up the coast. It was reported in early 2016, that the Associated British Ports control tower on the point is being re-located across the Humber Estuary to Grimsby due to progressive deterioration of the point.

== Industry ==
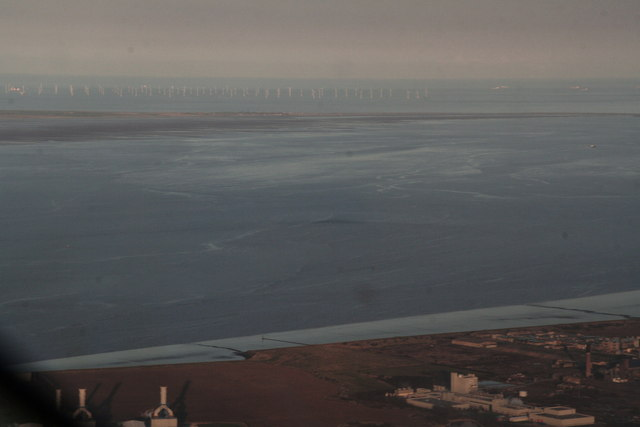
Humber Gateway Windfarm from Killingholme

The coastline of Yorkshire has played (and still continues to play) host to some diverse industries. From north to south; Redcar has a major port, the deepest on the east coast of England (built to service the adjacent steel industry) and formerly had a steel works near to the beach for which a railway line was diverted in 1978. Skinningrove still has a specialist steel plate mill and Boulby Mine stretches 3.1 miles (5 km) under the north sea to win Potash, Polyhalite and as a secondary aggregate, Rock Salt. Another Potash and Polyhalite mine (Woodsmith Mine) is in preparation near to Whitby, which like Boulby will stretch out under the North Sea. Alum used to be quarried at Ravenscar and the region adjacent to Easington in the East Riding has on shore natural gas processing plants.

During the First World War, Skinningrove Iron Works manufactured High Explosives and Mustard Gas. To help protect it form aerial bombardment, a Sound Mirror was installed at Boulby (see Military history section).

In more recent times, windfarms have been granted permission to be sited off of the coastline with some being obvious from the shoreline (Teesside, Humber Gateway and Westermost Rough), whilst others (Heron Wind and Njord, Hornsea) are farther out to sea. There is also an onshore wind farm at Out Newton near to Easington comprising seven turbines.

=== Fishery ===
Fisheries have been an important part of the coastline's history which still continues today. Some of the world's best crab, lobster and shellfish is to be found in the waters of the Yorkshire coast. Fishing fleets large and small are located at many of the ports on the coastline with Whitby, Scarborough, Filey and Bridlington being prime examples of ports which historically hosted larger fleets. Bridlington is the largest shell fishing port in the British Isles and exports its catches to the continent, most oftentimes being France, Italy and Spain. Smaller scale operations also exist such as the lobster and crab fishermen working on the shoreline at Hornsea. In the 20th and 21st century, the Hornsea shell fishermen have been in confrontation with the big oil and gas business along the East Riding section of the coast. They maintain that pipes, outfalls and underground gas storage works have all colluded to put their fishery at risk.

== Shipping ==
The Royal National Lifeboat Institution (RNLI) has stations between the Tees and the Humber. These are located at;

- Bridlington
- Filey
- Flamborough
- Humber
- Redcar
- Scarborough
- Staithes and Runswick
- Whitby
- Withernsea

The station at Humber is located on Spurn Point and is the only RNLI station in Britain that is manned full-time.

Runswick Bay has its own rescue boat which was started in 1982. It was initiated after the RNLI lifeboat was moved up the coast to Staithes. The Runswick Bay Rescue Boat (RBRB) works closely with the RNLI and HM Coastguard to attend local incidents and also to get to places on this stretch of coastline that are inaccessible to larger rescue boats. Like the RNLI, the RBRB is a charity funded organisation that relies on voluntary staffing.

The Humber Operations Centre of HM Coastguard is located in Bridlington.

The shipping routes in the North Sea are some of the busiest in the world. Seagoing vessels pass by the Yorkshire coast to access and leave the major ports in Hull, Grimsby, Immingham and at Teesport. The North Sea also sees many sailings to and from oil and gas installations for supply.

=== Lighthouses ===
There are several lighthouses on the Yorkshire coast with many still active for shipping. Trinity House still operate Flamborough Head and Whitby remotely from their operating centre in Harwich, Essex. The list below includes only those with buildings still in situ, if not operating.

Name	Location	Built	Notes
Flamborough Head	Flamborough	1806	Automated in 1996 - still active.
Scarborough Pier	Scarborough	1804	Manned in summer.
South Gare	Redcar	1884	The only privately operated lighthouse in England, owned by PD Ports.
Spurn Low Lighthouse	Spurn	1852	Superseded by the new Spurn Point lighthouse built in 1895. Abandoned in 1895.
Spurn Point	Spurn	1895	Ceased operation in 1985.
Whitby Pier Lighthouses	Whitby	1835/1855	There are two piers at Whitby; each one (west & east) have a beacon light (disused) at the end and stone lighthouses further back. The West Pier Lighthouse was built in 1835 and the East Pier Lighthouse in 1855. The piers are owned by Scarborough Borough Council.
Whitby Lighthouse	Saltwick Bay	1898	Operation automated in 1992.
Withernsea	Withernsea	1894	The lighthouse at Withernsea was built 0.25 miles (0.40 km) inland. Last used in July 1976.

Many beacons were located on the coast, especially during times of national crisis such as the threat of the Spanish Armada. The beacons were manned day and night with two people during the day and three overnight. Each beacon consisted of three individual fires with the combination of one, two, or all three being lit signalling the perceived intention of invaders. For example, one fire might mean enemy ships sighted, two fire that the enemy intended to invade, and all three fires that an invasion was imminent.

== Military history ==
The coast of Yorkshire has been involved in military endeavours since Roman times. Roman signal stations were believed to have been installed at Whitby near to where the abbey ruins are and at Goldsborough near Lythe. The breakwater at South Gare in Redcar, was installed with gun defences in 1891. These were utilised in the First and Second World Wars.

The radio and coastguard stations in Scarborough and Whitby were part of a targeted attack on 16 December 1914 by the German Navy during the First World War. Elsewhere, the stretch of coast between the Tees and the Humber was a dangerous place in the First World War due to the presence of the German U-Boats. The U-Boats were responsible for sinking 220 vessels with torpedoes and mines. Many other ships were suspected of being sunk here but they cannot be accounted for. Between 1917 and 1918 eight U-Boats were sunk off the Yorkshire coast with 6 sites being known and the last two wrecks sites being located in 2003.

The spit of land at Spurn Head was militarised in 1805 during Napoleonic times. In 1914 when Britain went to war against Germany, Spurn was upgraded with a railway being built to bring in supplies and ammunition. The headland was used for military purposes during the Second World War and was finally de-militarised in 1959. Sound Mirrors were built at Kilnsea, Boulby and Redcar in 1916. The concrete blocks had a hollowed out dish shape that pointed out towards the sea. They were early form of RADAR being able to detect ships and aircraft up to 25 miles away.

During the Second World War, the Yorkshire coast was fortified with pillboxes and tank traps on the shoreline and anti-aircraft and anti-shipping batteries installed at Ringborough. The Ringborough Battery was constructed in 1943 on what was then near to the coast line at East Garton. It has been subject to coastal erosion and most of the former battery site now lies ruined or on the beach. The Royal Air Force installed RADAR and listening sites, bombing ranges and Air Force stations along the coast at Goldsborough, Ravenscar, Bempton, Carnaby, Cowden, and Holmpton

== Film and TV location ==
The coastline in Yorkshire has been the setting for many feature films and TV programmes. These include;

- All at Sea - CBBC TV programme filmed in Scarborough
- Captain Jack - feature film based on the exploits of Jack Lammiman who took his boat to the Arctic as an homage to William Scoresby (partly filmed in Whitby)
- Dad's Army - parts were filmed on the East Riding coast, especially in Bridlington
- The Hunter's Prayer - an action thriller with sequences shot all over Yorkshire including Scarborough and Flamborough
- Old Jack's Boat - CBeebies TV programme; outside sequences are filmed at Staithes
- Testament of Youth - a film version of Vera Brittain's autobiography filmed in part at Robin Hood's Bay and Cloughton Wyke
- The Royal - sister TV programme to Heartbeat, set in Scarborough and filmed there
- The Syndicate - Kay Mellors' 3rd installment of how lottery winners cope with new found wealth was filmed in Scarborough

== Rivers ==
Of all the major rivers in Yorkshire, only the Esk drains eastwards directly to the North Sea without flowing into the Tees or the Humber estuaries. The Swale, Ure, Nidd, Wharfe, Aire, Calder and Don all end up flowing through the Humber. Even the River Derwent, which rises on the eastern edge of the North York Moors and reaches within 4 miles (6.4 km) of Scarborough turns westwards and then south to flow out through the Humber.

In response to flooding on the Derwent in 1799, a river was carved out from Mowthorpe to Scalby which allows floodwaters to drain to the sea, thereby sparing the riverside further downstream. The Sea Cut, as it is known, was completed in 1804 and roughly follows the route that waters used to drain eastwards towards the sea before the last Ice Age and the Derwent river headed inland.

== Tourism ==
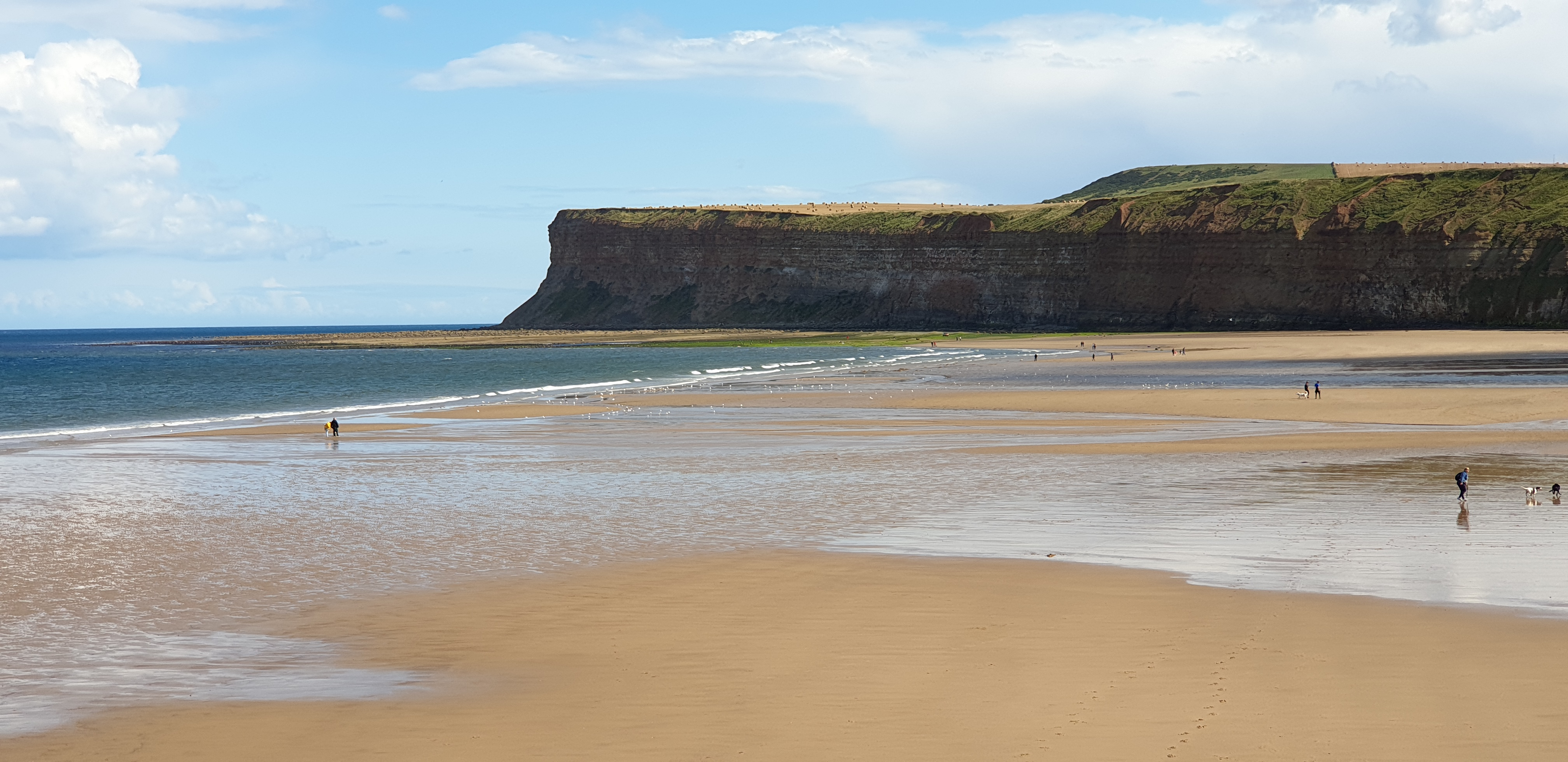
Hunt Cliff and Saltburn beach

An average of 1.4 million people visit the North Yorkshire Coast every year and more people visit the Yorkshire Coast than any other part of England outside of London. The Lonely Planet Guides rate Yorkshire as a whole as third in its top ten global places, the only part of the United Kingdom to feature in the list.

Besides noted attractions such as the beaches and seaside towns, other notable visiting spots on the coast include Bempton Cliffs, Flamborough Head, Hunt Cliff, the Sea Life Centre at Scalby Mills, Scarborough Castle and Whitby Abbey which on its own attracts more than 150,000 visitors annually. Pleasure cruises are available from Bridlington and Scarborough to allow visitors to see the coast from the sea and for sea fishing tours.

=== Beaches ===
The coastline plays host to many beaches, be they sandy or rocky. As of 2016, just four of the beaches along the coast have been awarded Blue Flag status; Whitby West Cliff, Scarborough North Bay, Bridlington North Beach and Hornsea.

Redcar & Cleveland Borough Council have responsibility for one of the longest unbroken stretches of beach in the United Kingdom. This section runs from South Gare to Staithes in North Yorkshire. Surfing and Kite Surfing are popular on Redcar beach.

== See also ==
- Yorkshire Coast College
- Hull to Scarborough Line
- North Yorkshire
- Yorkshire coast fishery
