= MV Yorkshire Belle =

MV Yorkshire Belle is the name of the following ships:

- MV Yorkshire Belle (1938), sunk 11 April 1941 in the Humber by a mine
- MV Yorkshire Belle (1947), a pleasure cruiser still in service
