= Chain Home Low =

British early warning radar system during World War II

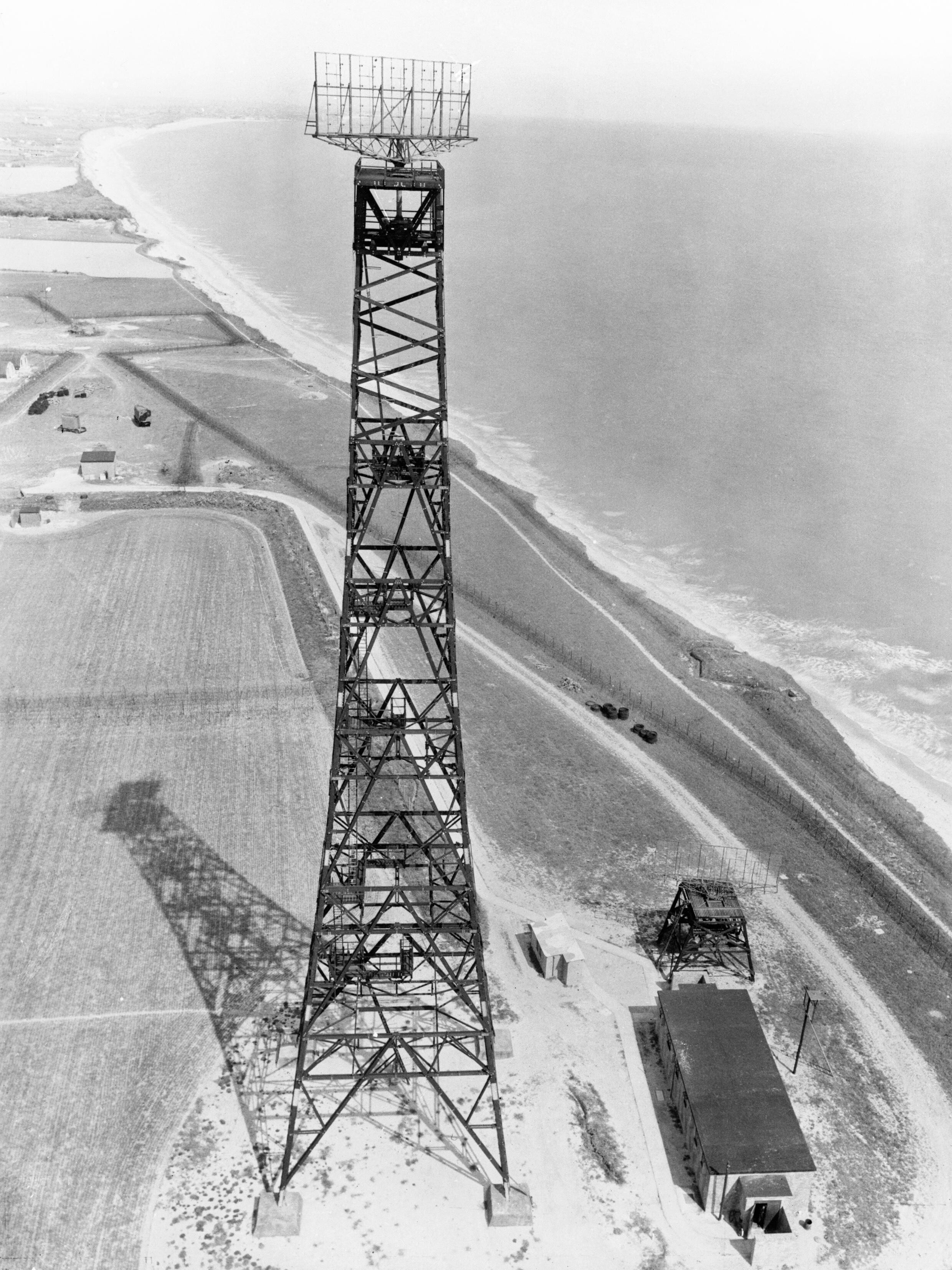
- Chain Home Low station at Hopton-on-Sea
- Country of origin: United Kingdom
- Introduced: July 1939
- No. built: 100+
- Frequency: 200 MHz
- PRF: 400 Hz
- Beamwidth: 1.5° (horizontal)
- Pulsewidth: 3 μs
- RPM: Up to 3.3
- Power: 150 kW
- Other names: AMES Type 2, CD Mark I

Chain Home Low (CHL) was the name of a British early warning radar system operated by the RAF during World War II. The name refers to CHL's ability to detect aircraft flying at altitudes below the capabilities of the original Chain Home (CH) radars, where most CHL radars were co-located. CHL could reliably detect aircraft flying as low as 500 feet (150 m). The official name was AMES Type 2, referring to the Air Ministry Experimental Station at Bawdsey Manor where it was developed, but this name was almost never used in practice.

The system had originally been developed by the British Army's research group, also based at Bawdsey, as a system for detecting enemy shipping in the English Channel. It was built using the electronics being developed for the aircraft interception radar systems, which worked on the 1.5 m band, at 200 MHz. This high frequency, for the era, allowed it to use smaller antennas that could be swung back and forth to look for returns, in contrast to the enormous fixed antennas of the 6.7 m wavelength (45 MHz) Chain Home system.

When the war began, the Luftwaffe began mine-laying missions where the bomber aircraft would fly almost all of their mission at low altitude. Chain Home could only see targets above 1.5 degrees over the horizon, so these aircraft only became visible at short range. Robert Watson Watt seized several dozen of the Coastal Defense (CD) systems that were in final construction and installed them at CH stations and key locations along the seashore to fill this critical gap in the coverage.

CHL remained an important part of the Chain network for the rest of the war. In 1941 an improved version, CHL Mark V, was introduced to standardize all of the units in service and future production. Mark V introduced a transmit/receive switch that allowed it to use a single antenna for both purposes, greatly simplifying the systems, as well as introducing a motorized system to swing the antenna which allowed it to drive a plan position indicator (PPI) display which made shorter-range tracking dramatically simpler. Mark V was retained in the post-war era until it was replaced during the ROTOR upgrades by the AMES Type 80. The electronics, notably the high-power transmitter, was also re-used in a number of other systems, including the AMES Type 7.

== Development ==
=== Accidental discovery ===
CHL traces its origins to early experiments with aircraft interception radar systems in 1936. These were developed as a short-range radar that would be used to close the gap between Chain Home's (CH) approximate 5 miles (8.0 km) accuracy and the visual range of a night fighter pilot at about 1,000 yards (0.91 km). Developed by a team at Bawdsey Manor led by "Taffy" Bowen, the new radar had to operate at much shorter wavelengths in order to limit the antenna sizes to something that could be practically fit on an aeroplane. After considerable experimentation, the team settled on a set working at 1.5 meter wavelength, about 193 MHz in the VHF band.

In early experiments with the new set, the team found that detection of other aircraft was problematic due to their target's relatively small size, but especially due to reflections off the ground. The latter caused a very strong signal that appeared to be at a range equal to the aircraft's current altitude, and everything beyond that was invisible in the resulting clutter. This meant that a typical night bombing run by German aircraft at 15,000 feet (4,600 m) altitude would only become visible at that range, far less than the desired minimum of 5 miles (26,000 ft).

These same experiments demonstrated an unexpected side-effect. As the aircraft flew around over Bawdsey, which is located on the coast of the English Channel, the team found strong constant returns that they later realised were the cranes at the Harwich docks, miles away. Other smaller returns were quickly identified as boats in the Channel. These were being detected at ranges far beyond the maximum range against aircraft, in spite of the antennas not being designed for this role.

The potential of this discovery was not lost, and Robert Watson-Watt asked the team to demonstrate the concept in a real-world setting. A series of military exercises in the Channel in September 1937 provided a perfect test. On 3 September the team's test aircraft, Avro Anson K6260, detected several Royal Navy ships in the Channel, and the next day repeated this performance in spite of almost completely overcast skies. Albert Percival Rowe of the Tizard Committee later commented that "This, had they known, was the writing on the wall for the German Submarine Service."

=== Coastal Defence (CD) ===
The British Army was actually the first to consider radar, when Alan Butement and P. E. Pollard submitted a paper in 1931 suggesting using pulses of radio signal to measure the distance to ships. The Army was uninterested until they heard about Watt's work at Bawdsey, when they suddenly became very interested. In October 1936 a liaison team led by Edward Paris and Albert Beaumont Wood was set up at Bawdsey, officially known as the Military Applications Section, but universally referred to as the "Army Cell".

Ironically, the only two technicians with the required experience available were Butement and Pollard. The two quickly began development of two projects, the Mobile Radar Unit (MRU) which was a mobile version of Chain Home, and Gun Laying radar, a much smaller unit designed to provide range measurements against aircraft as an aid to aiming their anti-aircraft artillery. Both operated at the longer wavelengths typical of the RAF radars of the era, which led to them being relatively large. The teams had made considerable progress on both projects by the summer of 1937, with Gun Laying radar, Mk. I (GL) about to enter initial production, and the MRUs later taken over in 1938 by the RAF as the AMES Type 9.

With this work starting to move from development to production, coincident with Bowen's astonishing anti-shipping demonstration, Butement began looking for ways to adapt Bowen's 1.5 m set for new roles. They revisited their original concept to develop Coast Defence radar (CD), allowing the Army's coastal artillery to aim their guns at night or in fog. The CD set was in most respects a version of the GL working at the shorter 1.5 m wavelength, and like GL, used separate transmit and receive antennas that had to be rotated together to be aimed at a target. The earlier GL system operated at just over 6 m, which meant the antenna was very large. The GL array had only four horizontal elements in it, which offered resolution on the order of 20 degrees. This allowed the operator to pick out a single aircraft as long as they weren't in formation, but could not be used to directly guide the guns. In contrast, the 1.5 m wavelength of the new sets allowed an antenna of about the same size to feature eight dipoles, reducing the angle to about 1.5 degrees.

Although this was of marginal capability in terms of directly aiming the guns, in July 1939 it was noticed that when the Army's 9.2-inch guns missed their targets, the splash of water caused by the shell would cause a brief but obvious return on the radar sets. This meant that any inaccuracy in the radar antenna's measurements could be eliminated by comparing the target and the splashes on the screen, as these would both have exactly the same error. The gunners could then correct their fire ("walk") onto the targets in the same fashion that they would when being given corrections by remote observers.

=== CD becomes CHL ===
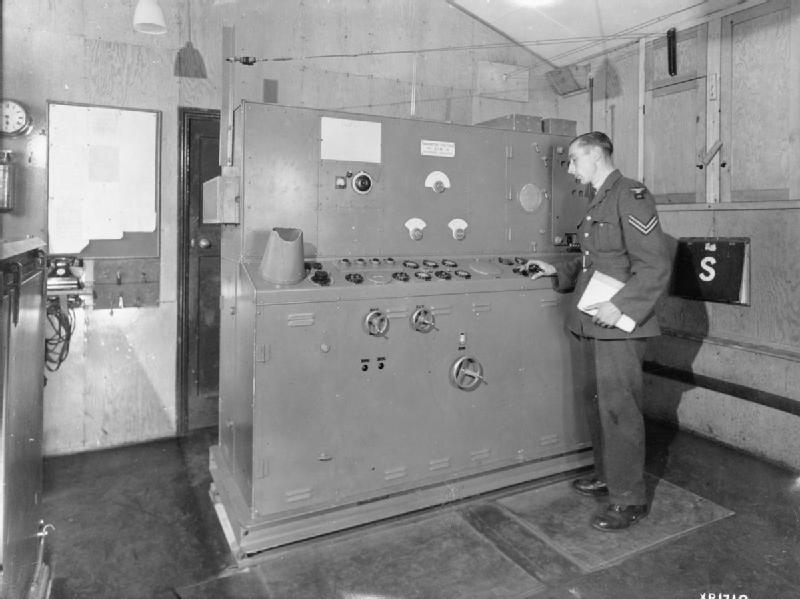
Metrovick Type T3026 transmitter

During early tests against Chain Home in 1938, RAF pilots had noticed they could escape detection by flying at low altitudes. This was due to the minimum angle of the CH being about 1.5 degrees above the horizon, which meant aircraft were below the radar's sight until they approached within a few miles. They could escape detection entirely by flying between two CH stations at altitudes around 1,500 feet (460 m). At first this was not considered to be a serious limitation, as bombers typically flew at altitudes of 15,000 feet or greater, and at that altitude they could be detected over France.

But as the magnitude of the problem became clear, Watt became concerned. In July 1939 he placed an order for twenty-four CD sets under the name AMES Type 2 (Type 1 being Chain Home), intending to place one at each Chain Home station to allow coverage at lower altitudes, as low as 500 feet (150 m). These differed from the CD sets primarily in the antenna: instead of a single horizontal array, CHL used four stacked arrays of five dipoles, reducing the azimuth accuracy but allowing altitude to be estimated by comparing the returns from the different sets of vertical arrays. In keeping with its rapid introduction, CHL was a relatively simple manually-directed system that required the operator to hunt for targets by swinging the antenna back and forth looking for returns. The antenna was originally powered by WAAFs mounted on wheel-less bicycles whose chains were connected to a gear system.

It was not long after the start of the war that the Germans accidentally noticed the effect when flying low. In this case, aircraft sent on minelaying sorties almost always returned while those on other intruder missions were almost always intercepted. These aircraft had to drop their payloads from very low altitudes, so they generally followed routes over water, including rivers, flying at low altitudes for most of the mission. At first, it was not obvious why they were surviving, as there could be many reasons; fighters might not be able to see them against the ground, AA guns positioned inland might not be able to aim at them, etc. But it quickly became apparent that low altitude flight meant they were not being detected on the radars.

The Luftwaffe soon began a series of low-level attacks that proved almost impossible to defend against. Additional CHL sets were ordered and set up to fill the gaps between the sets co-located at the CH stations. In April 1941 all of the CHL sets were upgraded with a new antenna that was motorized to spin at 1, 1.5, 2 or 3.33 rpm, and used a single transmit/receive antenna instead of separate ones.

=== CHL and GCI ===
When first deployed, CHL was used both for early detection of low-level targets, as well as a system for tracking individual aircraft over land; unlike CH which was permanently facing over water, CHL could be turned to look in any direction. This latter role became outdated with the introduction of the AMES Type 7 in 1942. Electronically, the Type 7 was essentially a larger and more powerful version of the CHL, with a larger ground-level antenna. However, the antenna was continuously spun through a complete circle, and returns were plotted in a map-like form known as a plan-position indicator (PPI). Whereas CHL operators had to calculate a single target's position from the range and bearing, Type 7 operators saw all of the aircraft in their area simultaneously and could determine their map location directly. CHL was increasingly used purely for early warning, calling in the rough location of targets to Type 7 stations who would then know where to look. Later, 3 GHz-frequency Chain Home Extra Low (CHEL) radar were often co-sited with CHL sites, further extending detection as low as 50 feet (15 m).

Several adaptations of the CHL were made during the war. Such systems could be mobile in which units were placed on trucks for movement matching the enemy's, extending the RAF's options in engaging the enemy.

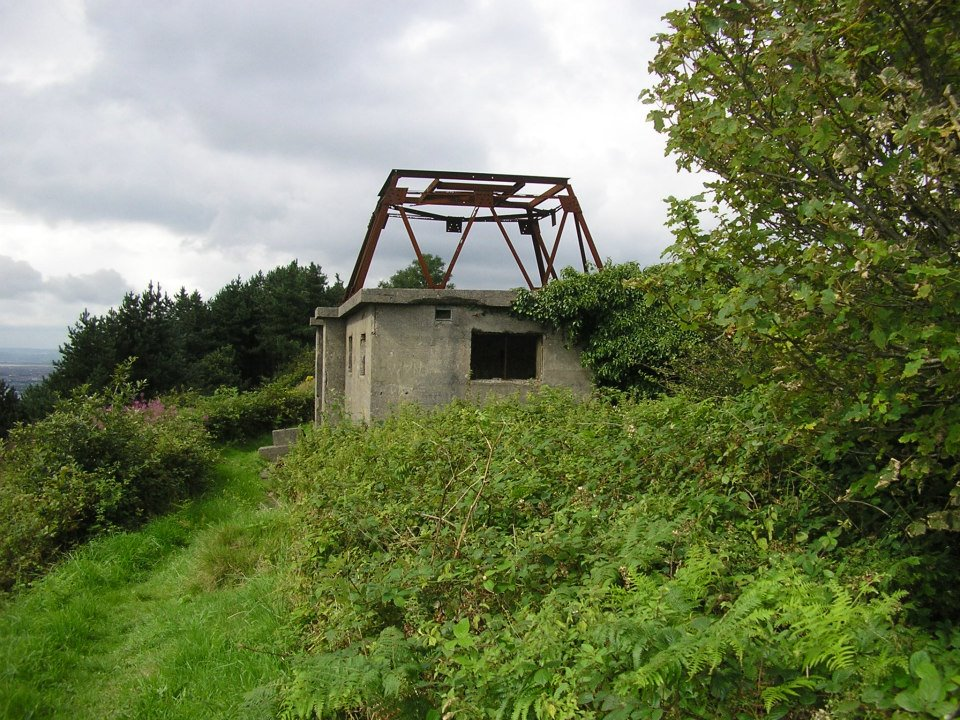
Margam CHL Station, 2012

=== AMES Type 11 ===
Although GCI began to supplant CHL during 1941 and especially 1942, CHL continued to provide an important early warning role. In February 1942 the Germans mounted the Channel Dash, moving two of their battleships to harbours in Germany by sailing them right up the English Channel. This major embarrassment was due largely to supremely effective jamming on the part of the Germans, who managed to render the CH and CHL radars covering the coast entirely ineffective without the operators even noticing.

To address this, the RAF began development of the AMES Type 11, a truck-mounted CHL system operating at 500–600 MHz. This frequency was chosen to match that of German anti-aircraft radars, in the hopes that the signals would be more difficult to notice, and that jamming would have negative effects on the German's own radars. Type 11's were deliberately used only in times of jamming in order to avoid giving the Germans signals intelligence about them, and in the end were little used.

== List of Chain Home Low sites ==
=== United Kingdom of Great Britain and Northern Ireland ===
- Anstruther, Fife
- Ballymartin, County Down, Northern Ireland
- Bamburgh, Northumberland
- Bard Hill, Holt, Norfolk
- Bawdsey, Suffolk
- Beachy Head, Sussex
- Beer Head, Devon
- Bembridge, Isle of Wight
- Bempton, Yorkshire
- Ben Hough, Tiree
- Bexhill, Sussex
- Blackhead, County Antrim, Northern Ireland
- Bolt Tail, Devon
- Boniface Down, Isle of Wight
- Carsaig, Isle of Mull
- Cleadon, County Durham
- Clett, Shetland Islands
- Cockburnspath, Borders
- Cocklaw, Peterhead, Aberdeenshire
- Covehithe, Suffolk (CHEL site)
- Crannoch Hill, Banff, Banffshire
- Craster, Northumberland
- Cregneash, Isle of Man
- Cresswell, Northumberland
- Cromarty, Ross and Cromarty
- Crustan, Orkney Islands
- Deerness, Orkney Islands
- Doonies Hill, Gregness, Aberdeen
- Dover
- Downhill, County Londonderry, Northern Ireland
- Dunderhole Point, near Tintagel, Cornwall
- Dunnet Head, near Thurso, Caithness
- Dunwich, Suffolk
- Easington, Yorkshire
- East Cliff, Portland, Dorset
- Eorodale, Isle of Lewis
- Fair Isle
- Fairlight, Sussex
- Foreness Point, Kent
- Formby, Lancashire
- Glenarm, County Antrim, Northern Ireland
- Goldsborough, Whitby, Yorkshire
- Great Orme, Llandudno, North Wales
- Greian Head, Isle of Barra
- Grutness, Sumburgh, Shetland Islands
- Happisburgh, Norfolk
- Hartland Point, Devon
- Hawcoat, Barrow in Furness, Lancashire
- Highdown Hill, Angmering, Sussex
- Hopton, Norfolk
- Humberston, Lincolnshire
- Hythe, Kent
- Islivig, Isle of Lewis
- Jacka, Portloe, Cornwall
- Kendrom, Kilmaluag, Isle of Skye
- Kessingland (Pakefield) Lowestoft, Suffolk
- Kete, Dale, Pembrokeshire
- Kilchiaran, Isle of Islay
- Kingswear, Devon
- Kinley Hill, Seaham, County Durham
- The Law, Carnoustie, Angus
- Margam, Margam Country Park, Neath Port Talbot
- Mark's Castle, Land's End, Cornwall
- Minehead, Minehead, Somerset
- Mossy Bottom, Shoreham, West Sussex
- Navidale, Helmsdale, Sutherland
- Needles, Isle of Wight
- North Foreland, Kent
- Oxwich, Swansea
- The Pen, Pembrey, Carmarthenshire
- Pen Olver, Lizard, Cornwall
- Pen y Bryn, Caernarfonshire
- Point of Stoer, Sutherland
- Poling, West Sussex
- Prestatyn, Denbighshire
- RAF Donna Nook, Lincolnshire
- Rame Head, Cornwall
- Ramsgate, Kent
- Ravenscar, North Yorkshire
- Roddans Port, County Down, Northern Ireland
- Rodel Park, Rodel, Harris, Western Isles
- Rosehearty, Aberdeenshire
- St Bees Head, Cumberland
- St Cyrus, Aberdeenshire
- St Davids Head, Pembrokeshire
- St Twynells, Pembrokeshire
- Sango, Durness, Sutherland
- Saxa Vord, Unst, Shetland
- Shotton, County Durham
- Skaw, Unst
- Skendleby, Lincolnshire
- South Ronaldsay, Orkney
- South Stack, Anglesey
- Spittal, Northumberland
- Strumble Head, Pembrokeshire
- Swansea Bay, Glamorgan
- Thorpeness, Suffolk
- Trevose Head, Cornwall
- Truleigh Hill, Bramber, West Sussex
- Ulbster, Wick, Caithness
- Ventnor, Isle of Wight
- Walton on Naze, Essex
- Warden Point, Isle of Sheppey, Kent
- Watsness, Walls, Shetland
- Westburn, Aberdeen
- Westcliff, Portland, Dorset
- Whitehawk, Brighton, East Sussex
- Whitstable, Kent
- Worth Matravers, Swanage, Dorset
- St. Roches Hill (The Trundle) West Sussex.

=== Canada ===
- Bell Lake, NS
- Tusket, NS
- Brooklyn, NS
- Queensport, NS
- Louisburg, NS
- Port Dufferin, NS
- Tignish, PEI
- St Georges, QC

=== Dominion of Newfoundland ===
- St John's (14 Radio Unit)
- Torbay (17 Radio Unit)
- Cape Bauld (30 Radio Unit)
- Port aux Basques (32 Radio Unit)
- Spotted Island (36 Radio Unit)
- Brig Harbour Island (37 Radio Unit)

== See also ==
- Chain Home
- Air Ministry Experimental Station
- ROTOR
- Linesman/Mediator
