= RAF Kilchiaran =

RAF Kilchiaran
- Kilchiaran, Isle of Islay, Argyll and Bute, in Scotland
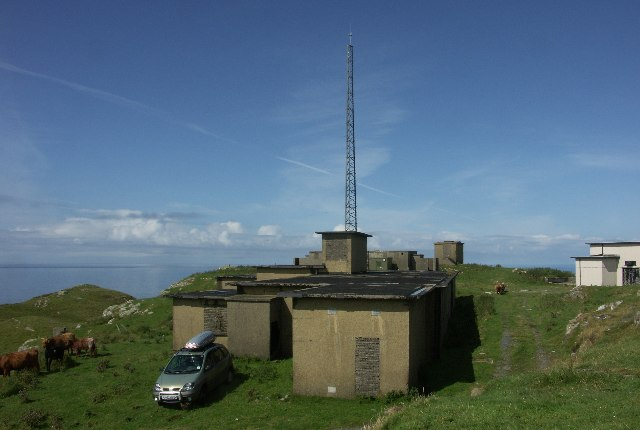
- Control buildings for Cold War-era RAF ROTOR radar installation at site of RAF Kilchiaran with Second World War Chain Home Low radar control buildings behind

Site information
- Type: Radar station
- Owner: Ministry of Defence
- Controlled by: Royal Air Force

Location
- Shown within Islay
- Coordinates: 55.766009°N 6.455266°W

Site history
- Built: unknown
- In use: unknown
- Battles/wars: European theatre of World War II, Cold War

RAF Kilchiaran was a Royal Air Force radar station situated on the Isle of Islay in Scotland. It was originally active from 1940–1945. In 1954, the base was refurbished to accommodate the RAF Kilchiaran Chain Home Extra Low (CHEL) radar station, which was obsolete by 1958. Since 1958, RAF has not used any of the facilities and BT Group has acquired a few buildings that are now microwave transmission stations.

== See also ==
- Islay Airport
