= Disappearance of Russell Bohling =

Mysterious disappearance in England

Russell Bohling
- Born: 29 December 1991; Hull, England
- Disappeared: 2 March 2010 (aged 18)
- Status: Missing for 16 years, 8 months and 4 days
- Occupation: Student
- Parents: Roger Bohling (father); Christine Bohling (mother)

Russell Bohling (born 29 December 1991) is an English man who disappeared from West Ella, East Riding of Yorkshire, England on 2 March 2010. Many theories have been put forward regarding his disappearance, with police surmising that he either killed himself or met with an accident, whereas his family maintains that a third party was involved. Despite repeated appeals for witnesses to come forward, Bohling's disappearance remains unsolved.

== Day of the disappearance ==
On the morning of 2 March 2010, Bohling left the family home at West Ella to attend Bishop Burton College in Beverley, where he was studying bricklaying. It is not known if he actually attended college that day, but his Renault Clio was found 45 miles (72 km) away at Bempton Cliffs, near a former Royal Air Force bunker at Bempton on the East Yorkshire coast.

Bohling's car was noted by an RSPB worker at 5:00 pm on 2 March 2010, and was still there when the worker returned the next morning. It had a ticket on it purchasing a full day's parking having been bought at 11:30 am the morning of 2 March.

== Discovery and initial investigation ==
In the initial searches of the area, the former RAF bunker was checked for a living human only, something that Bohling's family would go on to criticize. The Humberside Fire and Rescue Service (HF&RS) undertook their first search using heat-sensitive cameras and torches, which would have been ineffective if Bohling was already dead at that point. Firefighters went back and, as a training exercise, conducted a more detailed search of the bunker in December 2012. When this search was conducted, Bohling's family was present at the briefing and stayed there for the full three hours that the HF&RS were inside the bunker. This search cost the family £1,200 for the bunker's concrete to be opened up, as it had been sealed because of illegal use.

Searches were also undertaken on land around the bunker and Bempton Cliffs, which is a known suicide spot. The Coastguard also helped by searching at sea and from the air. Bohling's family later started court proceedings regarding the thoroughness of the search, but the case was thrown out when the Recorder presiding over the case said that it was not up to the courts to determine whether or not an investigation had been 'handled well'.

Searches were also carried out at the Bohling family's holiday home at Ravenscar in North Yorkshire. Two years after Bohling's disappearance, his family found his best pair of training shoes at the holiday home, which they are convinced he was wearing on the day he disappeared.

== Subsequent investigations ==
Police were eager to determine what Bohling's movements were three days before his disappearance. He had left home and returned without informing anyone of where he had been or what he had done. Investigations later established that he had visited York, Bradford and Bridlington, but there no indication of why he went there, or what he did.

It emerged that Bohling had logged on to an RAF Bempton website at 7:30am on the morning that he disappeared and had also looked at a webpage about Ravenscar. His father indicated that his son had been interested in the erotic and satanic artwork that had been left on the bunker walls by a cult in the 1970s, well after the bunker had been closed. Bohling had kept the information on the drawings on a USB stick which did not 'match that of his computer and those at his college.' The USB stick was not found during searches.

Bohling's family insist that a third party was involved in the disappearance, pointing to the fact that his car had only 3.8 litres (0.84 imp gal; 1.0 US gal) of fuel in it, so it would be impossible to reach the Bempton area without refuelling. The family recreated the journeys he undertook after his car was refuelled on 1 March 2010, determining that the car ran out of fuel at Brandesburton, which is 20 miles (32 km) short of Bempton. Bohling's debit card had not been used and he had very little cash on him, which the family claims is indicative of someone else being with Bohling when he drove to Bempton.

The family also maintain that a £300,000 payment that his father was set to give him so that he could start up a business may also be behind his disappearance. Bohling has a speech and language disorder where, when people ask him if he is all right, he would reply 'yes' even if he wasn't. His family say that this makes him vulnerable.

The police believe that Bohling may have killed himself. A tape recorded by Bohling, found by police, showed him acting out an imitation of suicide. The family were at pains to point out that this was a three-year-old tape which Bohling had recorded when he was 15 and anxious about his exams.

In 2012, Bohling's father said, "We are just waiting now for Russell’s body to turn up. We would like the police to carry out a cold case investigation, re-examining the evidence they missed at the time."

In 2019, it was reported that assistant coroner David Rosenberg had ruled out suicide in Bohling's case, stating "based on the submissions of the police that no body has been found, I believe somehow he died in the sea at Bempton Cliffs. We do not know how Russell came to die."

== Subsequent events ==
Bohling's disappearance was featured as an appeal on the BBC programme Crimewatch in the summer of 2010.

When the possessions that Bohling had taken with him on the day he disappeared were checked by his family, it was discovered that his brown, steel-capped boots were missing. Human feet were found on the banks of the Humber Estuary in August and September 2010. The second find was a human foot encased in a brown, steel-capped boot. After extensive investigation it was found that the feet were not connected to Bohling's disappearance.

Bohling's father was subsequently convicted of possessing child pornography when police searched the computer he had given to them in the unsuccessful hope it might reveal clues to his son's whereabouts.

== See also ==
- List of people who disappeared mysteriously: post-1970
