= Cresswell, Northumberland =

Village in Northumberland, England

Coordinates: 55.235°N 1.538°W

Cresswell
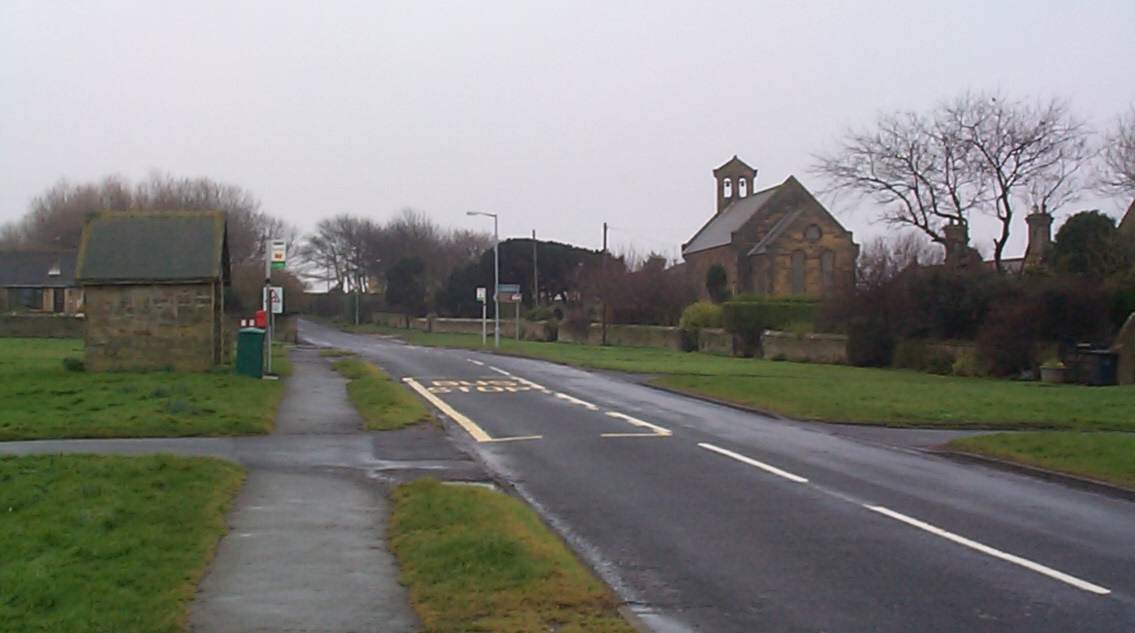
- Cresswell church

- Location within Northumberland
- Population: 206 (2011 census)
- OS grid reference: NZ295935
- Unitary authority: Northumberland
- Ceremonial county: Northumberland
- Region: North East
- Country: England
- Sovereign state: United Kingdom
- Post town: MORPETH
- Postcode district: NE61
- Dialling code: 01670
- Police: Northumbria
- Fire: Northumberland
- Ambulance: North East
- UK Parliament: North Northumberland

Cresswell is a village in Northumberland, England. It is about 4 miles (6 km) to the north of Ashington, on the North Sea coast.

== History ==
The place-name 'Cresswell' is first attested in the Close Roll for 1234, where it appears as Kereswell. It appears as Cressewell in 1242 in the Book of Fees. The name means 'stream where water cress grew'.

The Royal National Lifeboat Institution operated Cresswell Lifeboat Station between 1875 and 1944. The lifeboat was launched 58 times, and 91 lives were saved. The former lifeboat house is now Cresswell Village Hall.

During the Second World War, the Royal Air Force operated two radar sites south of the village on the road to Lynemouth. Both sites have since been cleared and have no above ground evidence of previous activity.

Cresswell is a popular bird watching area with Cresswell pond and bird hide nearby and the Druridge Bay Country Park less than 3 miles (5 km) away. The village has one ice cream shop which closes out of season, and a café on the beach just to the north of the village, open year-round. The village also has two caravan holiday home parks – Cresswell Towers and Golden Sands. Cresswell Towers takes its name from the old pele tower nearby, Cresswell Tower, and is owned by Parkdean Resorts.

At the 2001 Census, the village had a population of 237, which by the 2011 Census, had dropped to 206.

== Landmarks ==
Snab Point, 500 metres (1,600 ft) south of The Carrs, is a sheltered bay with the site of the former Alcan aluminium smelting plant on its south side. Embedded in the small cliffs of Snab Point are the remnants of fossilised trees. The beach area is littered with the remnants of fossilised wood and small seams of coal can be seen in the cliffs. Depending on the tides and wind, vast swathes of sea coal is washed up within the bay. The area was formed during the carboniferous period some 310 million years ago, when the current land mass was in a region below southern Spain, more than 1,000 miles (1,600 km) south of its present position.

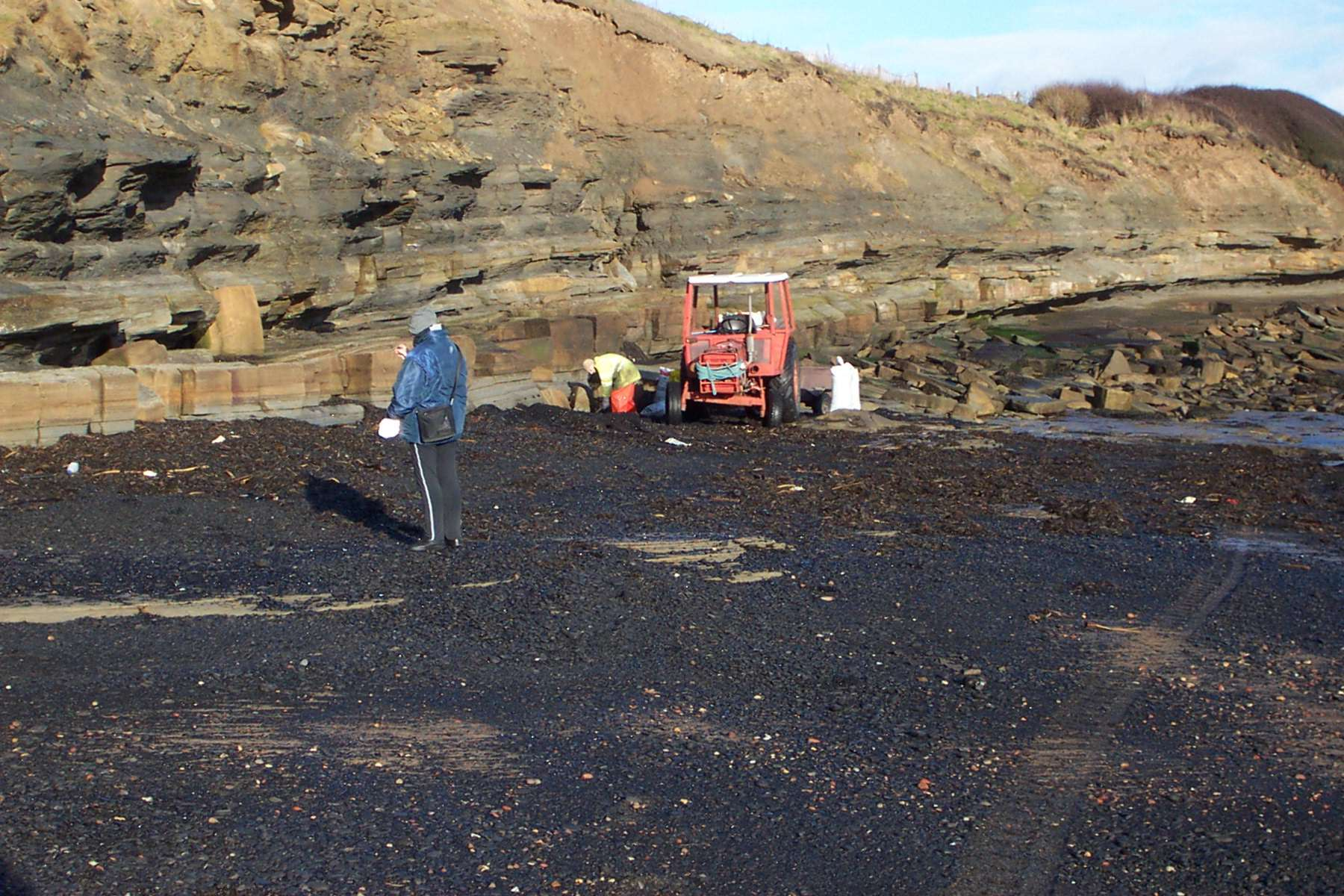
Sea coal washed up at Snab Point.

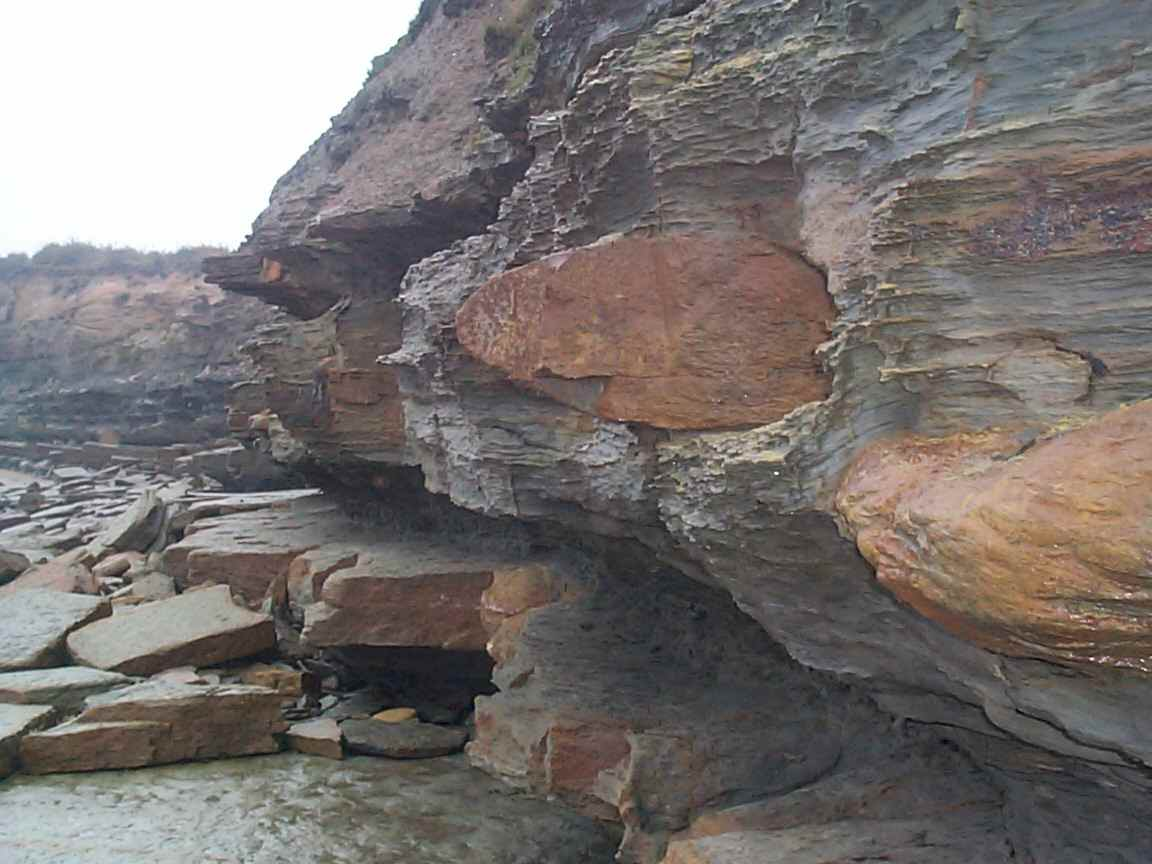
Fossilised tree remnants embedded in the cliff

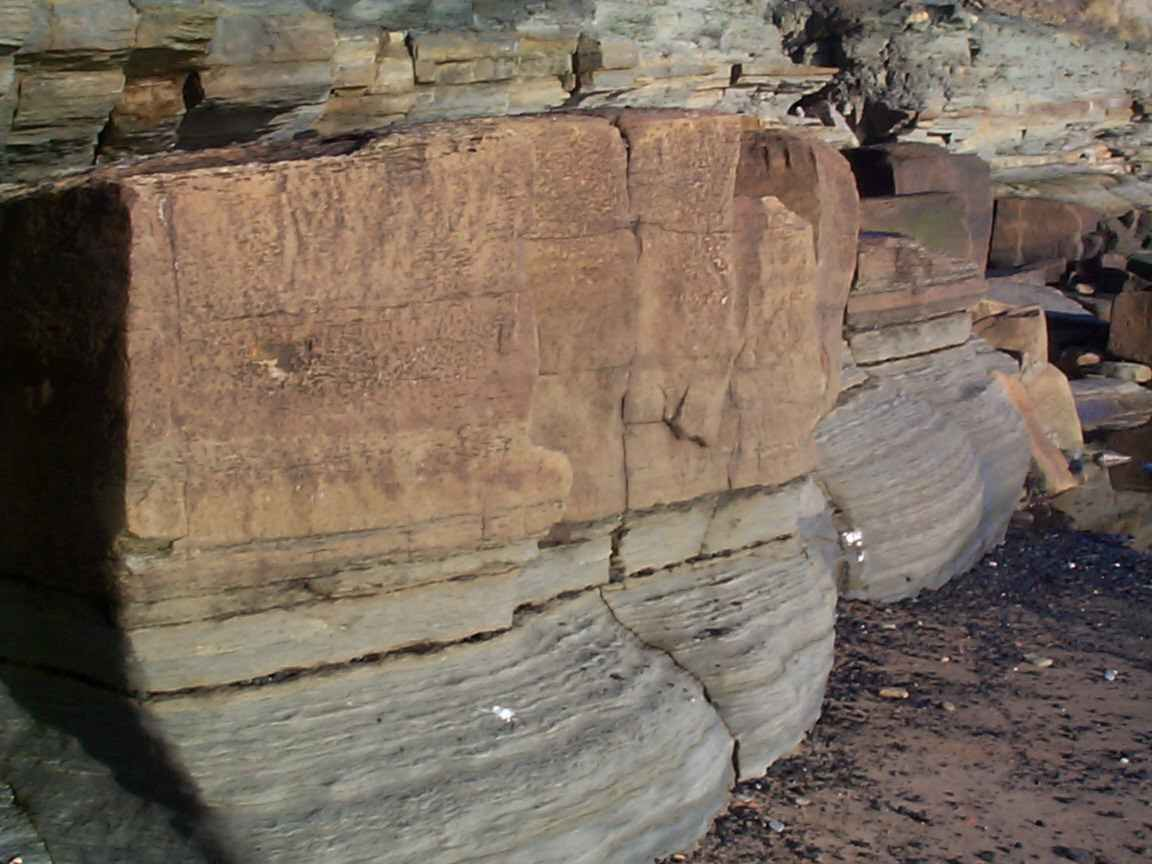
Fossilised wood.

== Music ==
Cresswell was the inspiration for 'Tidelines' by UK composer Peter McGarr a piece written for Gamelan at Fenham House.
