= Islay Airport =

Islay Airport Port-adhair Ìle

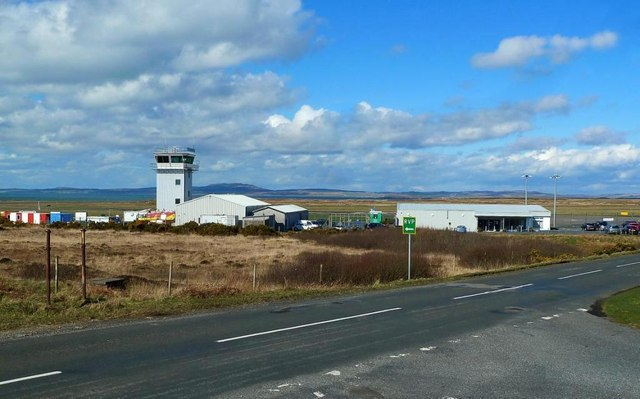
- IATA: ILY; ICAO: EGPI

Summary
- Airport type: Public
- Owner/Operator: HIAL
- Serves: Islay
- Location: Islay, Argyll and Bute, Scotland
- Opened: May 1, 1933
- Elevation AMSL: 56 ft (17 m)
- Coordinates: 55°41′00″N 006°15′35″W
- Website: www.hial.co.uk/islay-airport

Map
- Location in Scotland

Runways
Direction	Length		Surface
Direction	m	ft	Surface
12/30	1,550	5,085	Asphalt
07/25	635	2,083	Asphalt

Statistics (2025)
- Passengers: 32,080
- Passenger change 2024–25: ▲5%
- Aircraft movements: 1,232
- Movements change 2024–25: Steady
- Sources: UK AIP at NATS; Statistics: UK Civil Aviation Authority

Islay Airport (IATA: ILY, ICAO: EGPI) (also known as Glenegedale Airport) (Scottish Gaelic: Port-adhair Ìle) is located 5 miles (8 km) north-northwest of Port Ellen on the island of Islay in Argyll and Bute, off the west coast of Scotland. It is a small rural airport owned and maintained by Highlands and Islands Airports Limited. Today the airport is used for scheduled services to the Scottish mainland, and for air ambulances.

== History ==
The aerodrome was opened in May 1933, and initially services were provided from Glasgow via Campbeltown by the Midland and Scottish Air Ferries company. However, this was short-lived as the company closed down in late 1934. Services were taken over by a new company, Northern & Scottish Airways who operated a De Havilland Dragon aircraft three times per week from Glasgow. In 1937, the company amalgamated with Highland Airways and formed Scottish Airways, who operated daily flights from Glasgow to Islay on Monday to Saturday. This service continued with minor disruptions for urgent military duties for the duration of the Second World War.

In 1940, during the Second World War, the Prime Minister, Winston Churchill, ordered military airfields to be constructed in the western islands of Scotland, both to defend against a German assault on the Scottish mainland and also to provide reconnaissance planes a base to fly missions over the Atlantic Ocean. The present Islay airport was constructed as RAF Port Ellen in 1940, and received a concrete runway in 1942. During the Second World War, over 1,500 Royal Air Force (RAF) personnel were stationed at RAF Port Ellen.

The following units were here at some point:

- Relief Landing Ground for No. 3 (Coastal) Operational Training Unit RAF (August 1941)
- No. 48 Squadron RAF
- No. 304 Ferry Training Unit RAF (December 1942 – December 1943)
- 878 Naval Air Squadron
- 890 Naval Air Squadron

On 1 February 1947, Scottish Airways Ltd and its subsidiary company Western Isles Airways Ltd was taken over by British European Airways Corporation as part of the nationalisation of transport services under the Civil Aviation Act of 1946. In 1948, a question was raised in the House of Commons in relation to the number of staff (17) currently employed.

On 28 September 1957, de Havilland Heron 1B G-AOFY, while operating a flight for the Scottish Air Ambulance Service, crashed on approach to Islay, in bad weather. The three occupants, Captain T.M. Calderwood, radio officer Hugh McGinlay, and Sister Jane Kennedy from Glasgow's Southern General Hospital were killed. One of the remaining two Herons was named Sister Jean Kennedy after the nurse; the other after James Young Simpson, a Scottish pioneer in anaesthetics. This was the first crash in the history of the Scottish Air Ambulance Service.

On 29 June 1994, the Prince of Wales made headlines when he overshot the runway while landing a BAe 146 of No. 32 Squadron RAF. Although no one was injured, the plane was damaged.

== Airlines and destinations ==
Loganair connects Islay Airport to Glasgow Airport.

== Statistics ==
Passenger numbers at Islay Airport
Rank	Airport	Year	Passengers handled	change from previous year
1	Glasgow	2017	32,644	
1	Glasgow	2018	32,775	
1	Glasgow	2019	34,992	
1	Glasgow	2020	8,907	▼75%
1	Glasgow	2021	12,761	▲43%
1	Glasgow	2022	26,148	▲104%
1	Glasgow	2023	28,926	▲10.6%
1	Glasgow	2024	30,535	▲5.5%
1	Glasgow	2025	32,067	▲5%

== See also ==
- RAF Kilchiaran
