= Craster kipper =

Smoked herring from Northumberland, England

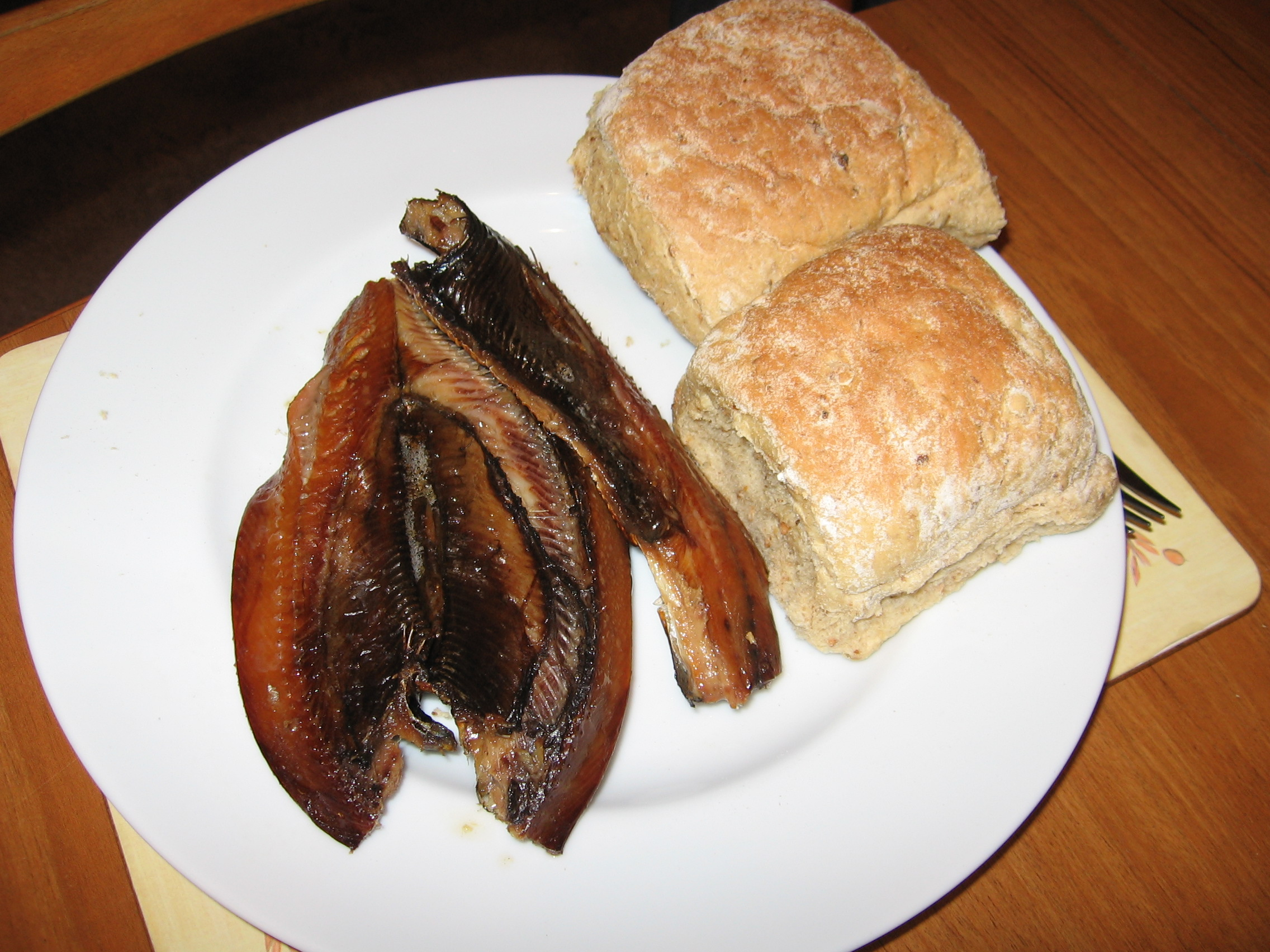
- Craster kippers served with buns
- Type: Kipper
- Place of origin: United Kingdom
- Region or state: Craster

Craster kippers are kippers from the Northumberland fishing village of Craster. They have been acclaimed as the best British kipper.

== Background ==
Like the Newmarket sausage or the Stornoway black pudding, the Craster kipper is a British food named after, and strongly associated with, its place of origin. Although the herrings used for Craster kippers may no longer be strictly local, the defining characteristic of the Craster kipper is that the smoking process takes place in a smokehouse located in or around the village of Craster.

Clarissa Dickson Wright has named Craster as the birthplace of the kipper. There is, however, some dispute over this – other places, including the nearby town of Seahouses, also claim this distinction.

== Preparation and characteristics ==
Although a long-standing tradition in Craster, commercial kipper production is currently only continued there by L. Robson & Sons, using their over 100-year-old smokehouses.

The preparation process begins with selected raw North Sea herring, known locally as "silver darlings". These are split, gutted and washed, soaked in brine, and then taken to the smokehouse where they are cured over smouldering oak and white wood shavings for sixteen hours. The famous smokehouse is unmistakable — a stone building often with white plumes pouring out of the wooden vents in the roof.

In appearance a Craster kipper is still recognizably a fish; the head is preserved and, unlike some other kippers which are dyed using annatto, the natural colours of the Craster kipper's skin are tanned golden by the oak smoke. The flesh has a distinctive reddish-brown colour.

== Gastronomic properties ==
It has been said that comparing the Craster kipper with a common commercial processed kipper is like "comparing a fillet steak with a cheap burger", and that "on the tongue, the [Craster] kipper is as delicate, as sophisticated, as the finest smoked salmon in the world and costs but a fraction of the price."

Craster kippers have been described as "the best", although that claim has also been made of other British kippers such as Loch Fyne kippers.

== See also ==
- List of dried foods
- List of smoked foods
