= MV Yorkshire Belle (1947) =

1947 British pleasure cruiser

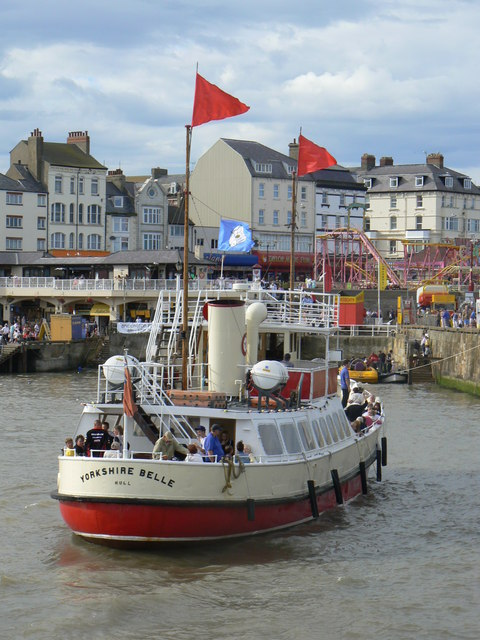
- The Yorkshire Belle in Bridlington Harbour after a pleasure cruise

History
- Name: MV Yorkshire Belle
- Owner: Mr Peter Richardson
- Port of registry: Kingston upon Hull, United Kingdom.
- Route: Bridlington Bay, Flamborough Head, Bempton Cliffs, and Filey Bay
- Builder: Cook, Welton & Gemmell Ltd
- Yard number: 793
- Launched: Thursday 22nd May 1947
- Completed: June 1947
- Maiden voyage: June 1947
- In service: In service from June 1947 to present
- Status: In service as of April 2026.
- Notes: Yorkshire Belle has sailed in passenger service each summer season from 1947 to present with the exception of 2020 due to the COVID-19 Pandemic.

General characteristics
- Tonnage: 70 tonnes (69 long tons; 77 short tons)
- Length: 79 feet (24 m)
- Beam: 20 feet (6.1 m)
- Draft: 4.5ft (1.3716 metres)
- Decks: Four including tank top, main passenger deck, bridge deck, and monkey island.
- Installed power: Diesel engines. Originally: Twin 6 Cylinder Crossley diesels of 135hp. Since 1951: Twin 8 Cylinder Gardner 8L3 diesels of 152hp. Auxiliary: Single 4 Cylinder Lister diesel engine coupled to a Newton Derby alternator providing 240 volts of alternating current for onboard services.
- Propulsion: Twin triple blade screws. Outward turning when powering ahead.
- Speed: Cruising: 10 knots at 700rpm. Maximum: 12 knots at 900rpm.
- Capacity: 198 passengers
- Crew: 4
- Notes: Sources:

The MV Yorkshire Belle is a steel built, twin screw pleasure cruiser which sails from Bridlington, East Riding of Yorkshire, United Kingdom. She was built in 1947 at the Beverley shipyard, of Cook, Welton and Gemmell for a Bridlington syndicate led by the Pockley family, itself led by Mr Bride Hall Pockley. Yorkshire Belle provides a variety of cruises viewing Bridlington Bay, Flamborough Head, Bempton Cliffs, Filey Bay, Filey, Filey Brigg, and other features of the Yorkshire Coast. She is currently owned by Mr Peter Richardson, and his son Mr Sam Richardson. She is the replacement for an earlier vessel of the same name which sank in the Humber Estuary in April 1941, during World War II after hitting a magnetic mine, and sinking with all hands.

== History ==
The Motor Vessel Yorkshire Belle was built at Cook, Welton, and Gemmell's Beverley shipyard in the East Riding of Yorkshire, United Kingdom for a syndicate of Bridlington locals led by the Pockley family. She was launched sideways into the River Hull on Thursday 22 May 1947. After her launch, Yorkshire Belle sailed down the River Hull to Hull, and berthed in Princes Dock for fitting out. This is where the Princes Quay Shopping Centre is today. She is the second Yorkshire Belle at Bridlington. The first Yorkshire Belle was built in 1938 for A&W Crawford, and launched on Saturday, 7 May, 1938, also by Cook, Welton, and Gemmell as yard number 645. This Yorkshire Belle was requisitioned by the British Admiralty in 1939 along with fellow Bridlington pleasure cruiser, Boy's Own (Flamborian). She and Boy's Own were employed on the Humber Estuary and surrounding area as boom defence and patrol vessels. Her career was cut tragically short when, on Friday 11 April 1941, while patrolling the Humber Estuary close to the Haile Sand Fort (one of the Humber Forts), Yorkshire Belle struck a magnetic mine and was blown in two. Her shredded hull sank almost instantly taking the lives of all nine men aboard. The explosion also sank the nearby ship Othello taking another 12 lives.

After the war, Boy's Own returned to Bridlington to resume her career as a pleasure cruiser. The Pockley family duly placed an order with Cook, Welton, and Gemmel for the second, and current Yorkshire Belle. This Yorkshire Belle was of an improved and enlarged design, with a tall, wide, flared bow similar to that of her builder's trawlers, and a magnificent cruiser stern. She is 79 ft (24 metres) in length, 19.7 ft (6 metres) in the beam, has a draft of 4.5 ft (1.37 metres), and a freeboard of 5.7 ft (1.73 metres). Due to post-war shortages of the extremely popular and sought after L. Gardner and Sons diesel engines, she was originally fitted with twin 6 cylinder Crossley diesel engines of 135 horsepower each, giving her a maximum speed of ten knots. This was not an ideal arrangement, and she was considered slightly under powered, and she suffered from severe vibration. She was also fitted with an auxiliary generator set to provide 240V onboard power consisting of a 4-cylinder R A Lister and Company diesel engine coupled to a Newton Derby alternator. During her fitting out, and in honour of her predecessor, many fixtures and fittings which were removed from the original Yorkshire Belle when she was requisitioined by the admiralty were installed aboard. This is particularly noticeable today down in the current Yorkshire Belle's saloon bar where the tables and the chromework were faithfully preserved, and serve as a reminder of the loss and ensure a piece of the original Yorkshire Belle still sails to this day.

The Yorkshire Belle made her quiet maiden arrival in Bridlington in early June 1947. This was her first time out to sea, as her sea trials and compass adjustments had been conducted on the Humber Estuary. Upon arrival, she almost immediately loaded with passengers and sailed for a cruise to Flamborough Head wasting no time in beginning a long and illustrious career. Yorkshire Belle has sailed from Bridlington in passenger service every summer season between April 1 and October 31 ever since, with the notable and sole exception of 2020, when the Yorkshire Belle was laid up due to the global COVID-19 pandemic, UK government lockdowns and social distancing. Instead, she made three maintenance cruises into Bridlington Bay to keep her in fine mechanical condition.

In 1951, to increase power, improve reliability, reduce fuel consumption, and increase her maximum speed, Yorkshire Belle returned to her builders for re-engining. She was fitted with what many consider the finest diesel engines ever built, a twin pair of 8 cylinder Gardner 8L3 diesel engines, each producing 152 horsepower at 900 revolutions per minute. This gave the Yorkshire Belle an increased maximum speed of 12 knots at 900RPM. However, when cruising economically at 10 knots, her engines turn over at a more leisurely 700RPM. Her fuel consumption over both of her main engines and her generator set is approximately eight gallons of diesel fuel per hour. This is an incredibly low figure for the power and torque generated, and is a feature of the Gardener marine diesel engines, especially the L3 series which reach an amazing thermal efficiency of over 40%, making them highly sought after today, even 91 years (as of 2026) after the Gardner L3 series of engines was designed. This makes the Yorkshire Belle a clean, efficient, and environmentally sound vessel. For the sake of fuel savings, and environmental responsibility, the main engines are shut down while docked.

The year 1972 saw unusual duties for the Yorkshire Belle and her fellow Bridlington pleasure cruiser Flamborian. Due to coal strikes, the British Rail Humber Ferry service using coal-fired paddle steamers was suspended, and interim replacements sought. This included the Yorkshire Belle and Flamborian, as well as other pleasure cruisers from the east coast of England being draughted in to provide passenger-only cover service. This is briefly mentioned in a YouTube Video made by the Hull History Nerd, as local Hull historian.

The "modern" history of the Yorshire Belle with her current owner begins in 1982, with Mr Peter G Richardson, and Mr Roy Simpson. Peter, then a textile mill manager in New Mill near Huddersfield, West Yorkshire and Roy, a soft drinks salesman from Huddersfield, both had a long-term interest in the pleasure boats sailing from Bridlington, and knew each other through this mutual interest. After hearing a rumour that the Yorkshire Belle was for sale, they decided to follow the rumour and see where it led them. Roy was working as an engineer on board the Bridlington pleasure cruiser Flamborian, formerly Boy's Own, and Peter had just been made redundant due to the decline of the textile industry. It turned out that the rumour was true and after making enquiries, the vendor gave the pair a grace period of two months to see if they could raise the capital necessary to purchase her. Indeed, the capital was raised and closing documents transferring ownership to Peter and Roy were signed on 1 February 1982. As Peter and Roy had little to no experience of vessel handling, they hired friend "Jimmy" Shand to skipper the Yorkshire Belle, and to train and mentor them. Jimmy, an ex-RAF Marine Unit officer is said to have been an extremely tough task master, and whipped Peter and Roy into shape ready for their Board of Trade Ships Masters Examinations. February also saw the Yorkshire Belle dry docked at the Hepworth's Shipyard in the village of Paull, East Yorkshire for her annual out-of-water examinations and maintenance. The Board of Trade Survey found that while the Yorkshire Belle was in sound condition, she was in need of a little TLC. The remainder of February and March 1982 saw Peter, Roy, and the team at Hepworth's cleaning, scrubbing, repairing, painting, and restoring Yorkshire Belle to pristine condition. The end of March saw Yorkshire Belle fulfilling a job inherited from her previous owner, namely the recrewing of a supertanker which was anchored in the Humber Estuary. Due to a northerly gale, Yorkshire Belle was initially unable to sail to Bridlington to begin her summer season, and therefore missed the Easter holidays. Yorkshire Belle finally sailed for her first cruise with her new owners at Whitsuntide, Spring Bank Holiday for a trip to Bempton Cliffs to view the seabird colony carrying a very healthy load of 160 passengers. Barclays Bank manager Reginald Turner came down to the harbour to witness Yorkshire Belle's departure remarking that he believed his banks investment to be in safe hands. A condition of the sale of the Yorkshire Belle was the honouring of a booking for the Royal Yorkshire Yacht Club's Champagne Cruise that August to signal the start of Regatta Week. This has now become an annual tradition and the Yorkshire Belle still sails proudly into Bridlington Bay to kickstart the festivities each year.

The year 1982 also saw the unfortunate breakout of the Falklands War between the United Kingdom and Argentina over the disputed Falkland Islands. On Saturday 17 April 1982, the Hull passenger ro/ro ferry MV Norland was requisitioned by the British Admiralty and sailed to Portsmouth for conversion into a troopship. After the rapid installation of a helipad, military communications equipment, and boarding over of her interiors, Norland sailed to the Falklalnd Islands on Tuesday 27 April 1982 via Ascension Island for refuelling. Norland arrived in the Falklands carrying paratroopers on Friday 21 May 1982, and valiantly sailed into San Carlos Water "Bomb Alley" surviving heavy fire unscathed. After serving with distinction, and working alongside the great liners Queen Elizabeth 2, and SS Canberra, Norland returned to the UK in triumph. In February 1983 to welcome the Norland back to her homeland, Peter and Roy took the Yorkshire Belle to Hull for a special cruise from the city's Alexandra Dock to meet the triumphant ferry and escort her up the Humber Estuary. All preparations were made. The Yorkshire Belle was berthed in Alexandra Dock awaiting the big day, tickets had been printed, and bookings taken. However, Mother Nature intervened, and a storm force westerly wind blew up the Humber Estuary preventing the Yorkshire Belle from leaving her berth. Passengers were telephoned and their tickets refunded. In an ironic twist of fate, the same storm which prevented Yorkshire Belle from sailing to meet the Norland, also prevented Norland from reaching her berth in Hull, and as a result, sailed to Bridlington Bay to take refuge in the calmer waters there.

The next major event in the Yorkshire Belle's history occurred in 1987. As built, the Yokshire Belle had an open main passenger deck, with an island bridge roughly amidships. In inclement weather, a canvass awning could be unfurled over her stern providing limited shelter. However, Peter and Roy considered this inadequate, and wishing to protect their passengers comfort, sought to modify the Yorkshire Belle. Marine architects, and Hepworth's Shipyard were employed to design and build a new permanent superstructure for the Yorkshire Belle to provide fully covered, weatherproof accommodation for 100 passengers. This was to be built from steel, and running from the bridge island, aft toward the stern, leaving a small amount of outdoor seating at the stern to allow her mooring cleets to be accessed for docking. Toward the aft section of this new superstructure, the windows would be designed so that they could be removed in hot weather for the comfort of her passenger. This superstructure was based on that added to fellow Bridlington pleasure cruiser Flamborian in 1964, when she was modified and renamed. This superstructure was sympathetically designed to blend in with the Yorkshire Belle's graceful lines, to be exceedingly strong, but light enough not to affect the Yorkshire Belle's stability and seaworthiness. After undergoing extensive stability testing in Hull Marina and on the Humber Estuary, Yorkshire Belle sailed from Bridlington for the first time in her new form in summer 1987. Since this new superstructure permanently enclosed additional volume, this increases the Yorkshire Belle's gross tonneage, however the exact figures are unknown. Gross tonnage is not a measure of weight, but a measure of the enclosed internal volume, with 100 cubic feet equalling 1 gross tonne. The roof of this new superstructure was further modified in the early 2000s when safety regulations dictated that the Yorkshire Belle's stairwells could not provide a continuous drop from the Monkey Island (boarding deck above the bridge), to the main passenger deck. So, to meet regulations, a new walkway was constructed along the port side of the superstructure leading to a new set of stairs at her stern. This limits the distance a passenger can fall if they were to stumble. During the winter 2005/2006 out-of-water survey and overhaul it was decided to modify the Yorkshire Belle's livery. Having carried many coloured bands around her bridge of the years, finally settling on red, it was decided to paint a red band around the stern below the bumper and above the waterline, and extending approximately two thirds of the way to the bow. This broke the long-term tradition of Bridlington's pleasure cruisers wearing plain cream with white trim. This tradition was also broken by the Flamborian in 1997 when she was painted in a striking dark shade of Kingfisher Blue.

== Passenger facilities ==
Given her status as a classic heritage vessel, and her registration as a National Historic Ship, passenger facilities are limited as making vast changes could affect her heritage status. However, Yorkshire Belle is equipped with everything a passenger really needs on the cruises she operates.

There is seating for 198 passengers, with 100 of these seats being inside and weatherproof. Seating for a further 98 passengers exists in two positions, with a majority of these being on the forecastle, and a smaller seating area on the poop. There are separate ladies and gents lavatories, with the ladies being on the port side, and gents on the starboard side. She also has a fully licensed lounge bar on board, accessed via a staircase onto the tank top deck. This lounge bar serves an array of hot and cold drinks including tea, coffee, hot chocolate, a variety of draught and bottled beers and ciders, various wines and spirits, as well as soft drinks such as Coca-Cola, Pepsi, and J2O. Also served are a variety of snacks such as nuts, chocolate bars, and crisps. Drinking water is supplied to the lounge bar from a thirty imperial gallon fresh water tank in the forepeak compartment.

All passengers must have a basic level of mobility to access the Yorkshire Belle, as, as a heritage vessel built in 1947, and due to the nature of the boarding facilities at Bridlington Harbour, there is no wheelchair access. However, passengers with disabilities are still welcome on board, and crew are on hand at all times to assist in boarding and finding a seat. Prams and buggies may not be taken on to the passenger decks, however, these can be safely stored onboard on the bridge deck.

Throughout each cruise, the captain gives a live commentary, pointing out landmarks, locations, and features of interest, and giving a brief history of the area. Wildlife such as dolphins, whales, and sharks are commonly sighted from the Yorkshire Belle, and the captain will always point these out to passengers and slow or stop the ship to provide an extended wildlife experience. Species commonly seen include bottlenose dolphin, white-beaked dolphin, harbour seal and grey seal, harbour porpoise, and basking sharks. Rarer species sighted include minke whales, fin whale, and blue sharks. Also sighted are various seabirds such as European herring gull, shearwater, guillemot, Atlantic puffin, Northern gannet, kittiwake, razorbill, and fulmar.

Towards the end of each cruise the crew make a variety of Yorkshire Belle souvenirs available such as keychains, poastcards, fridge magnets, pens, pencils, notepads, mugs, framed pictures, dish towels, baseball caps, shirts, and hoodies. Several of these are also available from the Yorkshire Belle website's online shop.

== Association with The Royal Society for the Protection of Birds (RSPB) ==
For many years, The Royal Society for the Protection of Birds has used the Yorkshire Belle to operate special guided three hour cruises to Bempton Cliffs. These are organised by the RSPB themselves, and are separate from the Yorkshire Belle's normal cruises to Bempton Cliffs. All of these cruises carry RSPB volunteers aboard, and are suitable for beginners and advanced wildlife enthusiasts alike. There are three categories of RSPB cruise depending on the time of year, and which seabirds are most prominent at Bempton Cliffs at the time. From May to July, Puffin and Gannet cruises operate. These sail to the highest point of Bempton Cliffs with its 400ft tall sheer rockface to view Atlantic Puffin and Northern Gannets. In August, the Diving Gannets cruises take place. This includes hand throwing Atlantic Mackerel into the water, and watching Northern Gannets with a wingspan of over 6ft diving into the water like spears at over 60mph. In September the Pelagic cruises take place for enthusiasts to view the plethora of migrating seabirds as summer turns into autumn. These seabirds include Shearwater, Auk, Skua, Divers, Gull, and Tern.

== Summary ==
Yorkshire Belle weighs 70 tonnes (69 long tons; 77 short tons) gross and has a length of over 79 feet (24 m), a breadth of nearly 20 feet (6 m) and a depth of 5 feet 7 inches (1.7 m). With two eight-cylinder Gardner engines each giving 152 hp she can carry up to 198 passengers. The ship was fitted out with her diesel engines in 1951 and is the last of six pleasure boats from Bridlington that operated between the 1920s and the 1950s.

She is fully licensed with a lounge bar and is equipped with a public commentary system for pleasure cruises and sightseeing tours along Flamborough Head and the Yorkshire coast. As well as cruises to Flamborough Head, there are also special extended cruises to the Bempton Cliffs RSPB reserve offering close-up views of the cliffs, lighthouse and caves.

She was bought in 1982 by her current owner Mr Peter Richardson, who complained in 2007 about the UK's implementation of EU law restricting the Yorkshire Belle from sailing to Scarborough from Bridlington. Under the EU ruling, trips for Class C vessels were not allowed to go more than 15 miles (24 km) from a point of refuge, but the UK implemented it as no more than that distance from their home port. Richardson stated that the ship had regularly sailed between the two Yorkshire ports for the a period of 15 years up until the ruling.

== Awards ==
In 2008, she won Winner of The Sunday Times Best Boat Trip in Britain and was highly commended in the Remarkable East Yorkshire Tourism Awards for 2017.
