= RAF Dronehill =

Former Royal Air Force station in Scotland

RAF Dronehill
- Coldingham, Scottish Borders in Scotland

Site information
- Type: Radar station
- Owner: Air Ministry
- Controlled by: Royal Air Force

Location
- Location in Scottish Borders RAF Dronehill (the United Kingdom)
- Coordinates: 55.891°N 2.246°W

Site history
- Built: 1938
- In use: 1939-unknown
- Battles/wars: European theatre of World War II

Royal Air Force Dronehill or more simply RAF Dronehill is a former Royal Air Force station, a "G Chain Radar" site on Coldingham Moor, Scottish Borders, Scotland.

The site is currently being used as an caravan park and grassland.
