= Cresswell radar station =

Former RAF radar station in Northumberland, England

Cresswell radar station
- Cresswell, Northumberland in England
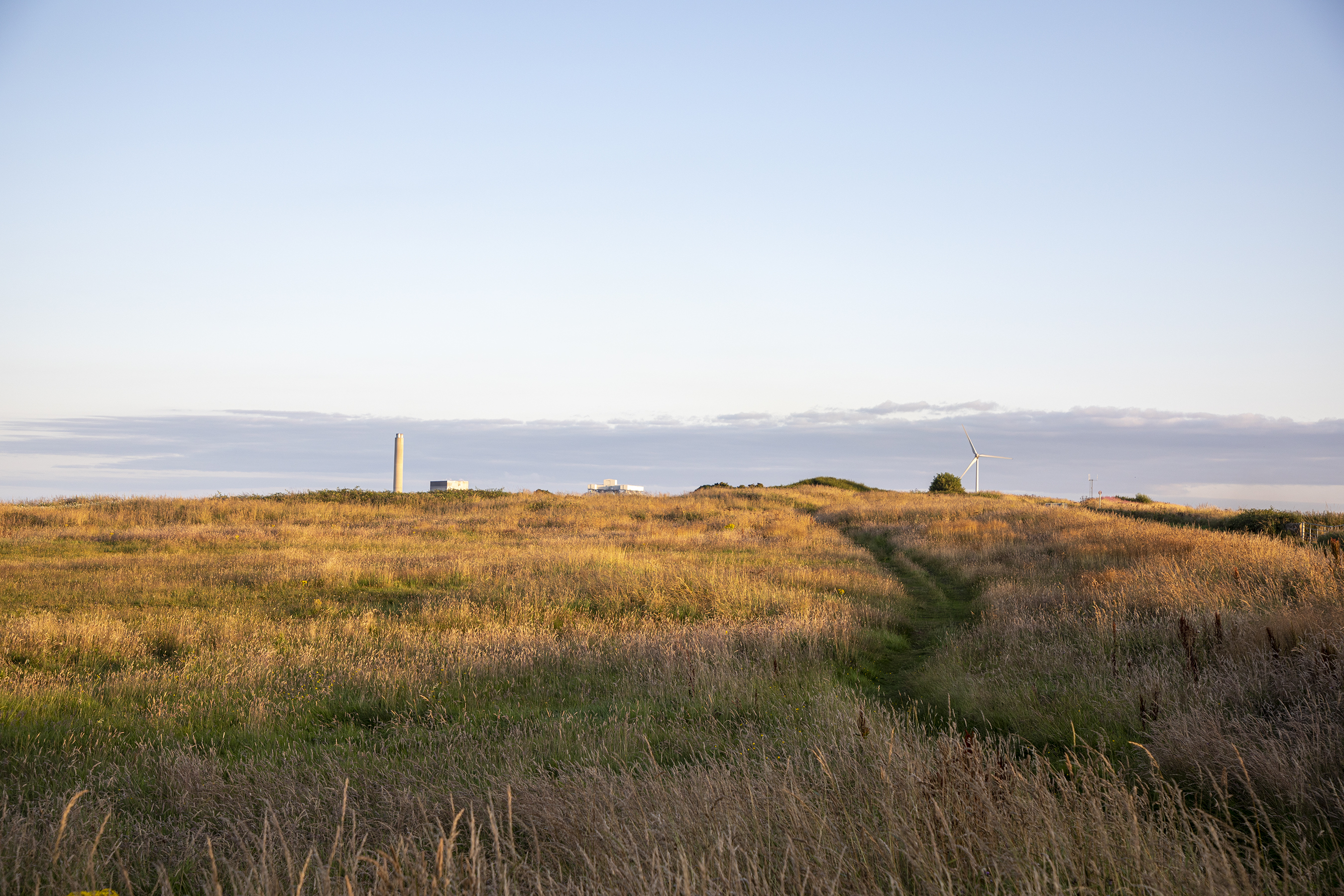
- Cresswell radar site no. 1 looking south. The chimney of Lynemouth power station is on the skyline.

Site information
- Type: Radar site
- Owner: Air Ministry
- Operator: RAF (No. 60 Group)
- Controlled by: RAF (No. 13 Group)
- Open to the public: Yes, public area

Location
- Location with Northumberland
- Coordinates: 55.226°N 1.528°W
- Grid reference: NZ301926

Site history
- Built: January 1945
- In use: February 1940–March 1945

Cresswell radar station (also known as RAF Cresswell), was a Chain Home Low (later a Chain Home Extra Low) Second World War radar site at Cresswell, in Northumberland, England. The radar site was south of the village of Cresswell on the road towards Lynemouth and each site occupied a different side of the road. The site was opened by early 1940 and was staffed by Royal Air Force personnel from No. 60 Group, who were accommodated at Lynemouth instead of being billeted at the radar site. Cresswell radar site was known to be poorly located as it did not have enough of a significant elevation above sea level to provide sufficient warning of approaching aircraft. Since closure c. 1945, both sites have been demolished and nothing remains of either site.

== History ==
At the time of the Munich crisis in October 1938, Britain had eleven radar sites, which were mostly located on the eastern coast. The concern over the rise of Nazi Germany prompted a wider development of the radar system. The site at Cresswell was surveyed in late 1939 and approved in January 1940. Initially equipped with a GL Mk II radar, the deployment of the mobile radar to Cresswell took several weeks, but it was operational by the end of February 1940. Signals picked up at Cresswell were fed into No. 13 Group (RAF) of Fighter Command between 1940 and 1944. However, the station was staffed and maintained from personnel drawn from No. 73 Signals Wing, part of No. 60 Signals Group, which had its headquarters at Leighton Buzzard.

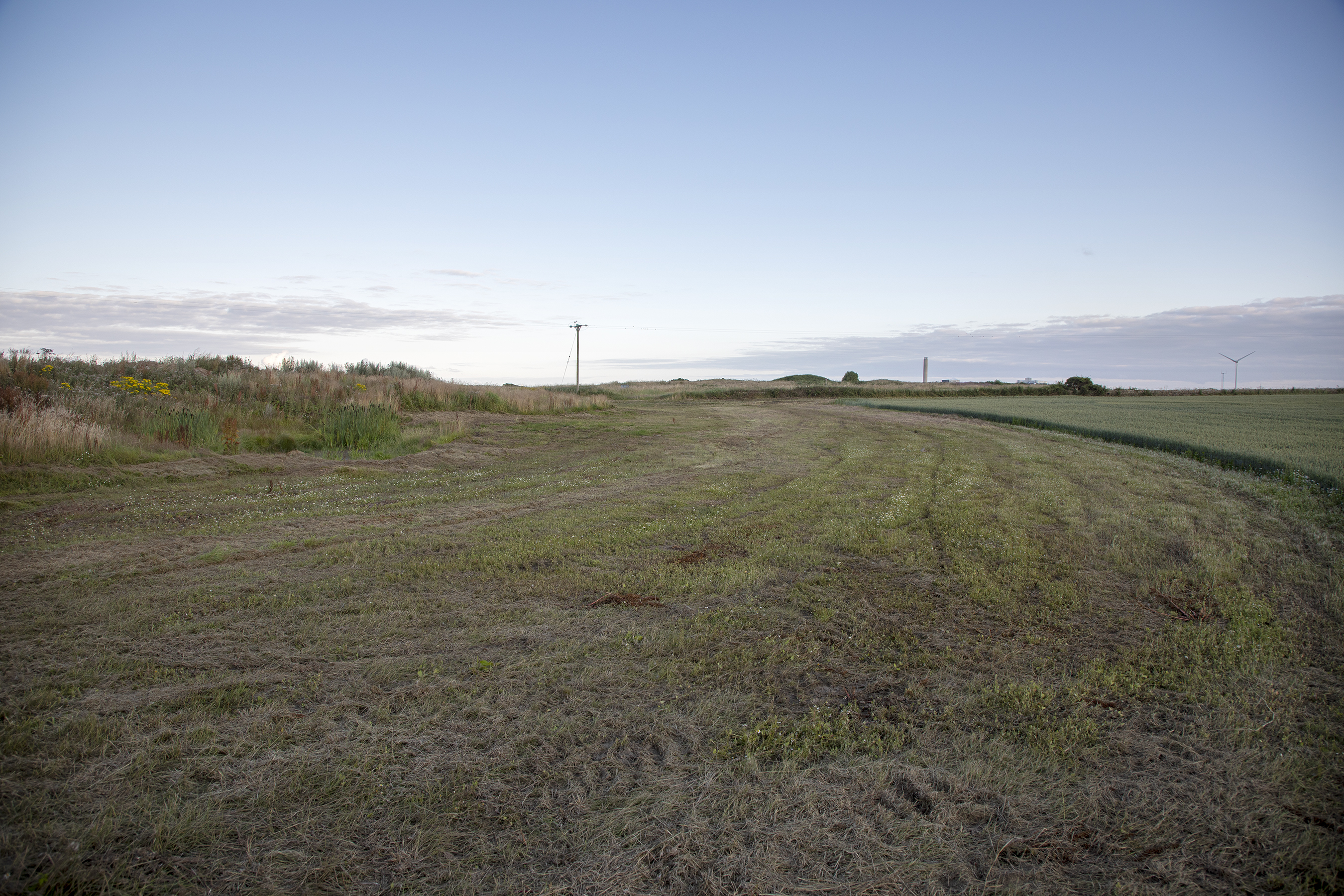
Cresswell radar site no. 2

The first site at Cresswell (station 40A), a Chain Home Low (CHL) station, was built east of the road between Lynemouth and Cresswell. This first station was deemed to be poorly sited, but then the successor station, a Chain Home Extra Low (CHEL) site (designated station K158), was located further inland on the other side of the road. At only 70 feet (21 m) above sea level, the station had a search range out to sea of only 9 miles (14 km); the CH/CHL/CHEL stations were expected to have a range of at least 10 miles (16 km) for accurate and timely aircraft interception to be launched from a Fighter Command airfield. Additionally, fears about radar operations in high winds prompted the installation of a CHEL tower at Cresswell, which was approved in March 1942, with the tower becoming operational in November-December 1942.

The original CHL site was kept as a GCI unit and was operational until at least 1945. Staff for the CHEL site at Cresswell were billeted in nearby Lynemouth, as opposed to the normal function of being housed in Nissen huts on-site.

Like other radar stations operated by the RAF during the Second World War, details of its exact closure are unknown. The 60 Group "Radar Bulletin" magazine from March 1945 lists the station as still being operational at the date of publication.
