= RAF Danby Beacon =

Royal Air Force base in Yorkshire, England

RAF Danby Beacon
- near Danby, North Yorkshire in England

Site information
- Type: Radar station

Location
- Shown within North Yorkshire
- Coordinates: 54.47716°N 0.8705°W
- Height: 360 feet (109.7 m)

Site history
- Built: 1937
- In use: 1937–1954
- Demolished: 1957

Royal Air Force Danby Beacon or more simply RAF Danby Beacon was an early warning radar Royal Air Force station that formed part of the Chain Home network of radar (or Radio Direction Finding (RDF)) stations built by the Royal Air Force immediately prior to the Second World War.

== Construction ==
The receiving masts were 240 feet (73.2 m) high timber structures and the transmitting masts were 360 feet (109.7 m) steel masts. The construction of these masts was the work of the RAF controlled, but civilian staffed, No. 2 Installation Unit of No. 1 Maintenance Unit RAF (1 MU).

== Second World War ==
During the first part of the war the station was under the control of 13 Group of RAF Fighter Command. On 3 February 1940 it was a plot from Danby that led Hawker Hurricane aircraft from Blue section, 43 Squadron stationed at RAF Acklington to shoot down a Heinkel He 111 bomber over Whitby. This was the first German aircraft shot down over England during the war, the British aircraft being under the command of (then) Flight Lieutenant Peter Townsend. The intercept is described in detail in Townsend's highly-successful book about the Battle of Britain, "Duel of Eagles."

Soon after control of the station passed to the newly formed 60 Group but its information was passed to 13 Group headquarters in Kenton, Newcastle upon Tyne.

== Cold War ==
In 1946 the station moved to the control of 90 Group and continued to function in the early warning role until 1954 when the station ceased operating. The masts and buildings were demolished in 1957.

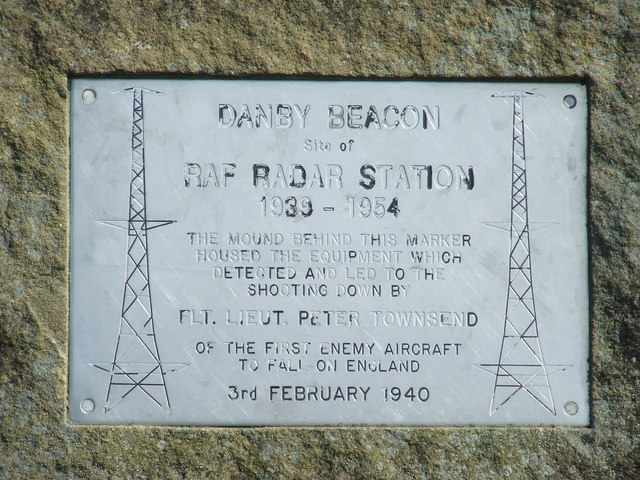
The tablet on the stone reads – "Danby Beacon. Site of R.A.F. Radar Station 1939–1954. The mound behind this marker housed the equipment which led to the shooting down by Flt. Lieut. Peter Townsend of the first enemy aircraft to fall on England, 3rd February 1940"

== Memorial ==
None of the structures remain but the site of the station is now marked by a memorial stone.
