= RAF Bempton =

Royal Air Force base in Yorkshire, England

RAF Bempton
- Bempton, East Riding of Yorkshire, in England
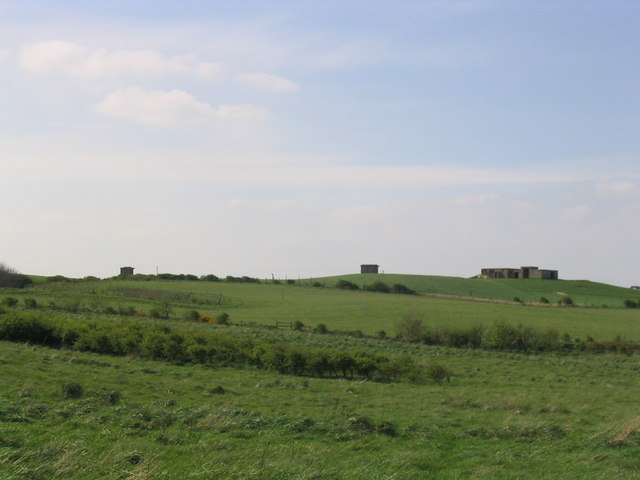

Site information
- Owner: Air Ministry
- Operator: Royal Air Force
- Controlled by: RAF Fighter Command

Location
- Shown within the East Riding of Yorkshire RAF Bempton (England)
- Coordinates: 54.1499°N 0.1778°W

Site history
- Built: 1940
- In use: 1940–1972

Royal Air Force Bempton or more simply RAF Bempton is a former Royal Air Force station situated at Bempton in the East Riding of Yorkshire, England, 6 miles (10 km) north of Bridlington. During the Second World War it was established as a radar station, becoming part of the Chain Home Low (CHL) network.

== Operational history ==
- 1940 The first CHL radar station was installed in early 1940 a few hundred feet from the lighthouse at Flamborough Head. This was at an elevation of 130 feet (40 m); at this height performance proved to be very unsatisfactory. A new higher site was found four miles up the coast on the 350 feet (110 m) cliffs at Bempton.
- The new site was opened in July 1940 as RAF Bempton. It was a CHL station.
- 1941 became a CHL/Chain Home Extra Low (CHEL) radar station.
- It disbanded on 1 August 1945.
- 1945 – Air Ministry Experimental Station Type 31
- 1 June 1949, re-established as a CHL/CHEL radar station.
- 17 February 1950 – transferred to RAF Fighter Command.
- On 1 November 1951 it was renamed as 146 Signals Unit Bempton rebuilt as a Centimetric Early Warning (CEW) radar station, part of the ROTOR Programme.
- The 146 Signals Unit was disbanded on 1 December 1961
- Bempton became a satellite station of RAF Patrington until its final closure in April 1972.

The site was also used for a secret High Speed Passive Array RADAR codenamed 'Winkle'. The distinctive Y-shaped concrete stanchions on the cliff edge are indicative of Winkle.

== Current use ==
The site was sold in 1980/81. The stairs down to the bunker were removed and other entrances were sealed over with concrete.

In 2010, a teenager named Russell Bohling from Hull went missing after his car was found abandoned by Bempton Cliffs. Police conducted a search for a missing person around the cliff area and inside the former bunker as the teenager had been given a memory stick detailing the pornographic artwork that a cult had painted on the walls of the bunker. Despite the Humberside Fire and Rescue Service later searching the area again for a body, no trace of Bohling has been found.
