= Craster =

Village in Northumberland, England

Coordinates: 55.471794°N 1.595788°W

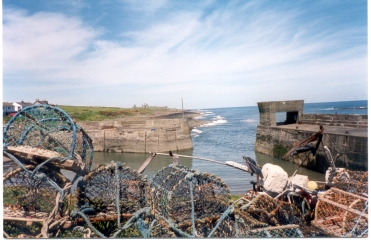
- View of Craster Harbour with lobster pots in the foreground, and Dunstanburgh Castle in the distance at centre left

- Location within Northumberland
- Population: 305 (2011 census)
- OS grid reference: NU255198
- Shire county: Northumberland
- Region: North East
- Country: England
- Sovereign state: United Kingdom
- Post town: ALNWICK
- Postcode district: NE66
- Police: Northumbria
- Fire: Northumberland
- Ambulance: North East
- UK Parliament: North Northumberland

Craster is a small fishing village on the Northumberland coast of England, eight miles (13 km) from Alnwick. The next village to the north is Embleton. It is within the Northumberland Coast Area of Outstanding Natural Beauty.

== Geography ==
The walk along the coast to the south passes by Cullernose Point, an example of the basaltic cliffs which are a significant feature of the local landscape, and are part of the Whin Sill. The walk along the rocky shore to the north along leads to the ruins of Dunstanburgh Castle.

== History ==
The remains of a tower on the end of the harbour are all that can be seen now of the much taller building which was part of the overhead equipment which used to convey the local stone from where it was quarried to boats in the harbour. The disused quarry is now a car park.

A mile to the west, Dunstan Hall is a mansion incorporating a medieval pele tower, now used as holiday accommodation.

A small distance inland lies Craster Tower, the home of the Craster family who were the local lords of the manor. A memorial on the harbour wall commemorates Captain John Charles Pulleine Craster, who was killed in Tibet on 28 June 1904.

For many years, the village has had a herring-curing business: Craster kippers are well known around the world.

During the Second World War, the Heughs, north of Craster, were home to a Coastal Defence/Chain Home radar station.
