= RAF Goldsborough =

Former Royal Air Force radar base in Yorkshire, England

RAF Goldsborough
- near Goldsborough, North Yorkshire, England
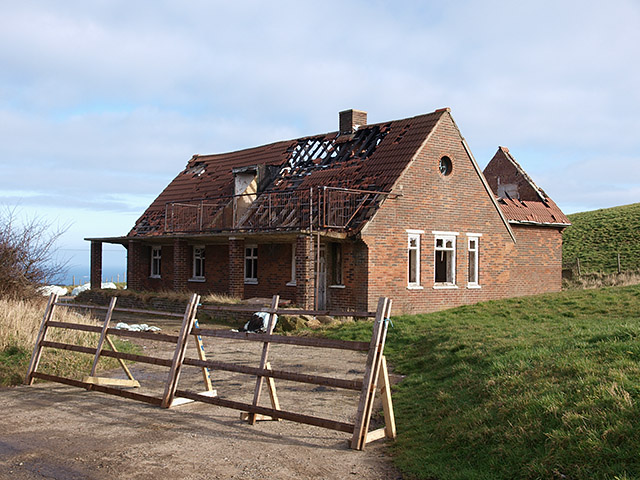
- Former guard house

Site information
- Type: Radar station
- Owner: Air Ministry
- Open to the public: No

Location
- Shown within North Yorkshire
- Coordinates: 54.5133°N 0.7203°W

Site history
- Built: 1941
- In use: 1942–1958

Royal Air Force Goldsborough or more simply RAF Goldsborough is a former Royal Air Force station located in North Yorkshire, England.

== History ==
It was a radar station and part of the RAF ROTOR system. Originally staffed by army personnel, it was handed over to the RAF in March 1942. It was opened as Radar station M45 as part of the coastal defence/Chain Home Low (CD/CHL) system. It was later upgraded to the ROTOR system with a new operating block being built between 1951 and 1952. The guardroom was destroyed by fire in 1958.

In the early 1960s, elements of the bomb disposal flights based at RAF Stafford used RAF Goldsborough as a base whilst clearing land at Snod Hill in preparation for the building of RAF Fylingdales.

== Current use ==
The guard house has been damaged in a fire and it is now private property.
