= Stenigot =

Village in the East Lindsey district of Lincolnshire, England

Coordinates: 53.309915°N 0.12095°W

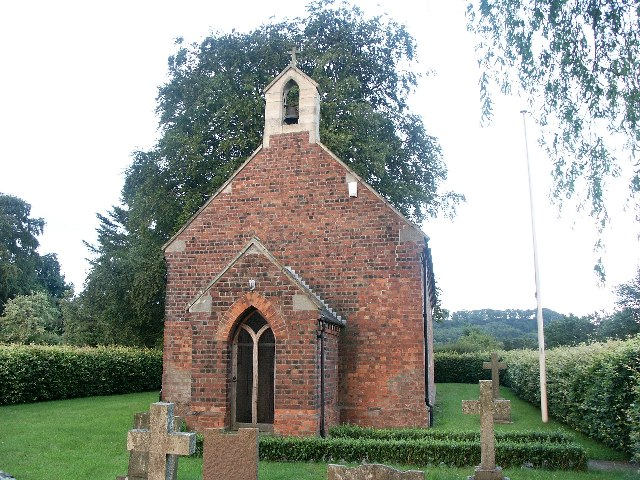
- St Nicholas's Church, Stenigot

- Location within Lincolnshire
- OS grid reference: TF252808
  - London: 120 mi (190 km) S
- District: East Lindsey
- Shire county: Lincolnshire
- Region: East Midlands
- Country: England
- Sovereign state: United Kingdom
- Post town: Louth
- Postcode district: LN11
- Dialling code: 01507
- Police: Lincolnshire
- Fire: Lincolnshire
- Ambulance: East Midlands
- UK Parliament: Louth and Horncastle

Stenigot is a village in the East Lindsey district of Lincolnshire, England. It is in the Lincolnshire Wolds, a designated Area of Outstanding Natural Beauty, about 6 miles (9.7 km) south-west from the town of Louth, and 1 mile (1.6 km) south-east from the village of Donington on Bain. It includes the hamlet of Cold Harbour. The population is included in the civil parish of Asterby.

The distinctive name 'Stenigot' is first attested in the Domesday Book of 1086, where it appears as Stangehou. This is thought to be a variant of the Old English Stāninga-hōh, meaning 'the spur of a hill' (hōh) of 'the people at a stone' (Stāninga).

The parish church is dedicated to Saint Nicholas and is a Grade II listed building dating from 1892. It is built of red brick and limestone, with a 15th-century octagonal font. There is a monument to Sir John Guevara, died 1607, of white, grey and orange streaked alabaster and a black marble inscription plaque to Francis Velles de Guevara, died 1592.

The village is probably best known for RAF Stenigot, a Chain Home radar station during the Second World War and later as a NATO ACE High station, with four tropospheric scatter parabolic dishes, three of which now removed for their scrap value.

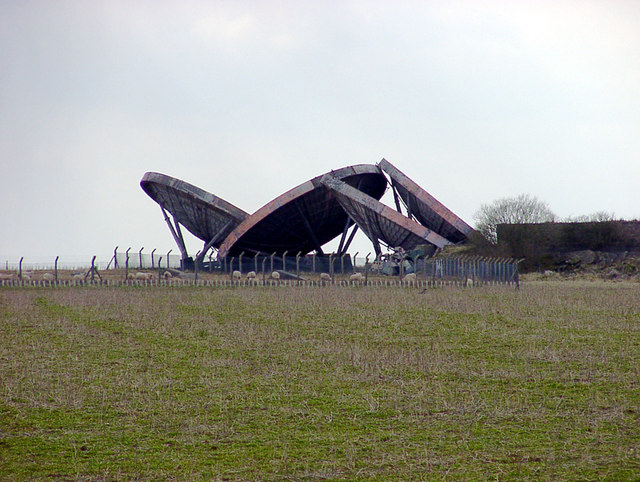
RAF Stenigot - abandoned tropospheric scatter dishes, now removed

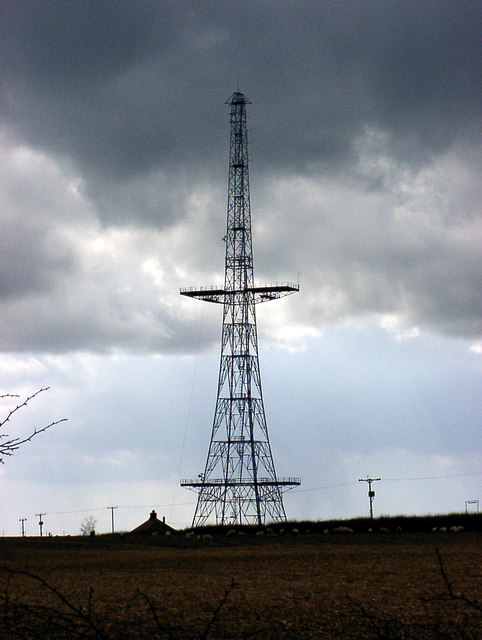
RAF Stenigot - 364 feet (111 m) Chain Home radar tower
