= RRH Brizlee Wood =

Royal Air Force base in Northumberland, England

RRH Brizlee Wood
- Alnwick, Northumberland in England
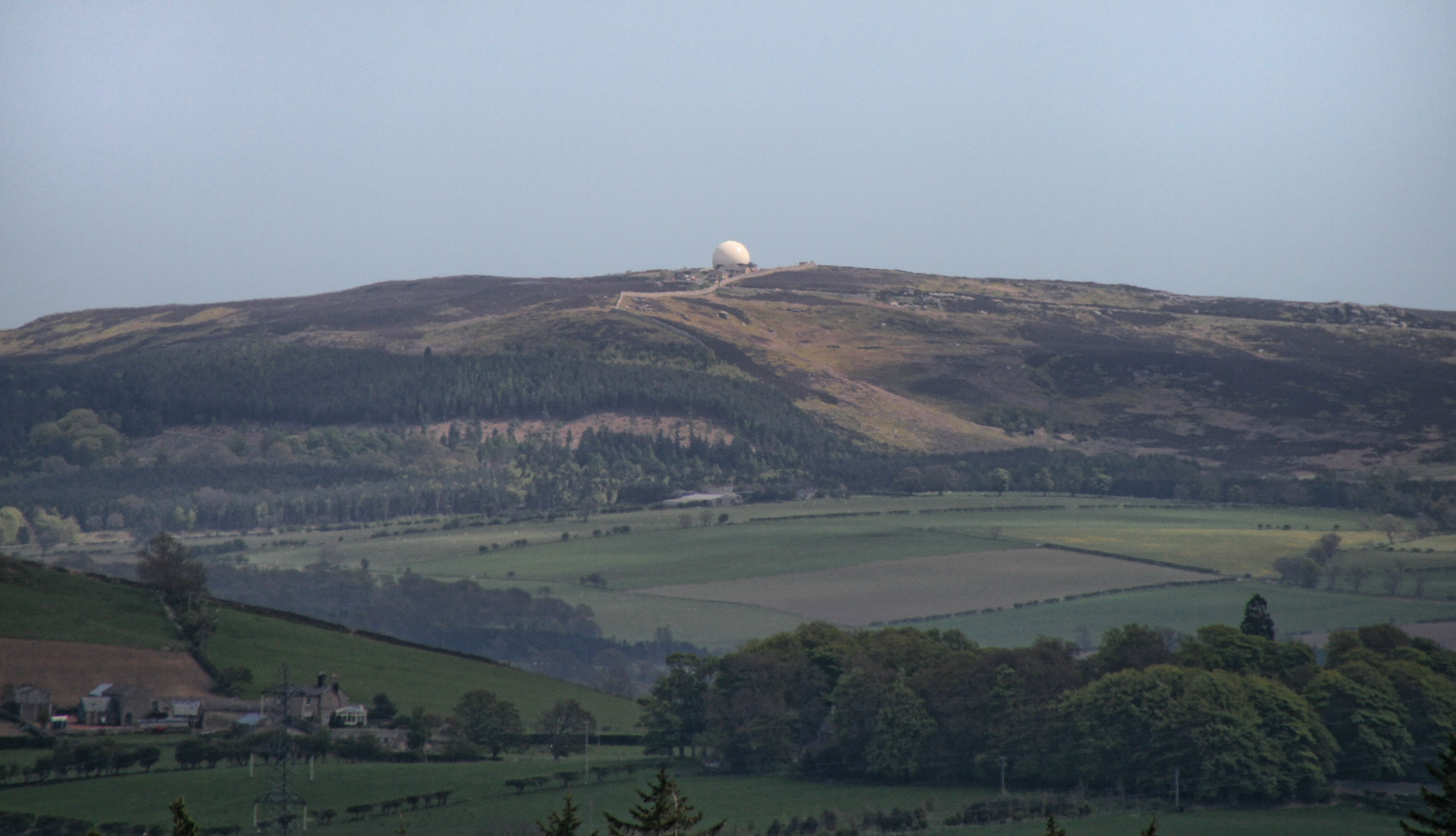
- The radome of RRH Brizlee Wood

Site information
- Owner: Ministry of Defence (MoD)
- Operator: Royal Air Force
- Controlled by: Air Command and Control Force

Location
- RRH Brizlee Wood
- Coordinates: 55.418°N 1.768°W
- Grid reference: NU147138

Site history
- Built: 1960
- In use: 1961 – present

Remote Radar Head Brizlee Wood (or RRH Brizlee Wood), is an air defence radar station operated by the Royal Air Force located at Brizlee Wood, near Alnwick in Northumberland, England. Originally opened as an Ace High site in the early 1960s, it now forms part of the Air Surveillance and Control System (ASACS) of the Royal Air Force.

== History ==
The site was one of the original Ace High sites dotted throughout Europe and into Asia. Ace High was a NATO communication system which stretched from Norway to Turkey. Brizlee Wood was one of five sites in the United Kingdom, (Note: The other four sites were at Maidstone in Kent, Stenigot in Lincolnshire, Mormond Hill near Fraserburgh and a site on the Shetland Islands.) and was equipped with four 130-foot (40 m) dishes. The system could offer communications over a distance of 500 miles (800 km), and was run by the Royal Signals, part of the British Army. In November 1990 when the Ace High network was superseded, it was confirmed the site would close in early 1991. The site was later converted into an RAF radar facility and was equipped with a Type 93 radar.

The site is located at 820 feet (250 m) above sea level and is notable from the surrounding area being known locally as "The Golf Ball". RRH Brizlee Wood feeds information into the Control and Reporting Centre (CRC) at nearby RAF Boulmer, some 8 miles (13 km) to the east, as part of the Air Surveillance and Control System (ASACS). The single radome houses a TPS-77 radar and sits 66 feet (20 m) above the ground, though the lower 16 feet (5 m) is the access platform.

In 2008, it was reported that BAE Systems had won a contract to supply new radar equipment which would combat the effects of windfarms on the radar tracking stations. The beam which is bounced back into radar stations can have a "shadow" caused by windfarms causing confused or non-existent signals. However, by 2012, it was further reported that a £45 million deal had been struck with SERCO instead. The placement of windfarms near to remote radar heads (RRH) has raised several objections by the MoD. Studies have shown that aircraft flying over windfarms appear "invisible" no matter what they are flying at, nor that distance from the RRH. Several proposed windfarms in the Northumberland area have been objected to by the MoD because of suggested interference with the Air Defence (AD) radar at RRH Brizlee Wood. The trialling of updated radars was successful at RRH Trimingham, so the MoD bought more of the TPS-77 radars to install at RRH Staxton Wold and Brizlee Wood. The radar installed at Brizlee Wood allowed the 48 tower windfarm at Fallago Rig to go ahead.

During 2020 under Project Hydra, the radome was taken down whilst the site received an upgrade. Project Hydra also upgraded the RRH stations at Benbecula and Buchan. The area the base is located in recorded the strongest winds during Storm Arwen in November 2021. Wind speeds at Brizlee Wood were registered at 98 miles per hour (158 km/h). The technology at the site will be upgraded, along with other radar stations, under Project Guardian, a new £80 million air defence programme.
