= Sembach Kaserne =

United States Army post in Donnersbergkreis, Germany

- Part of U.S. Army Installation Management Command
- Donnersbergkreis in Germany
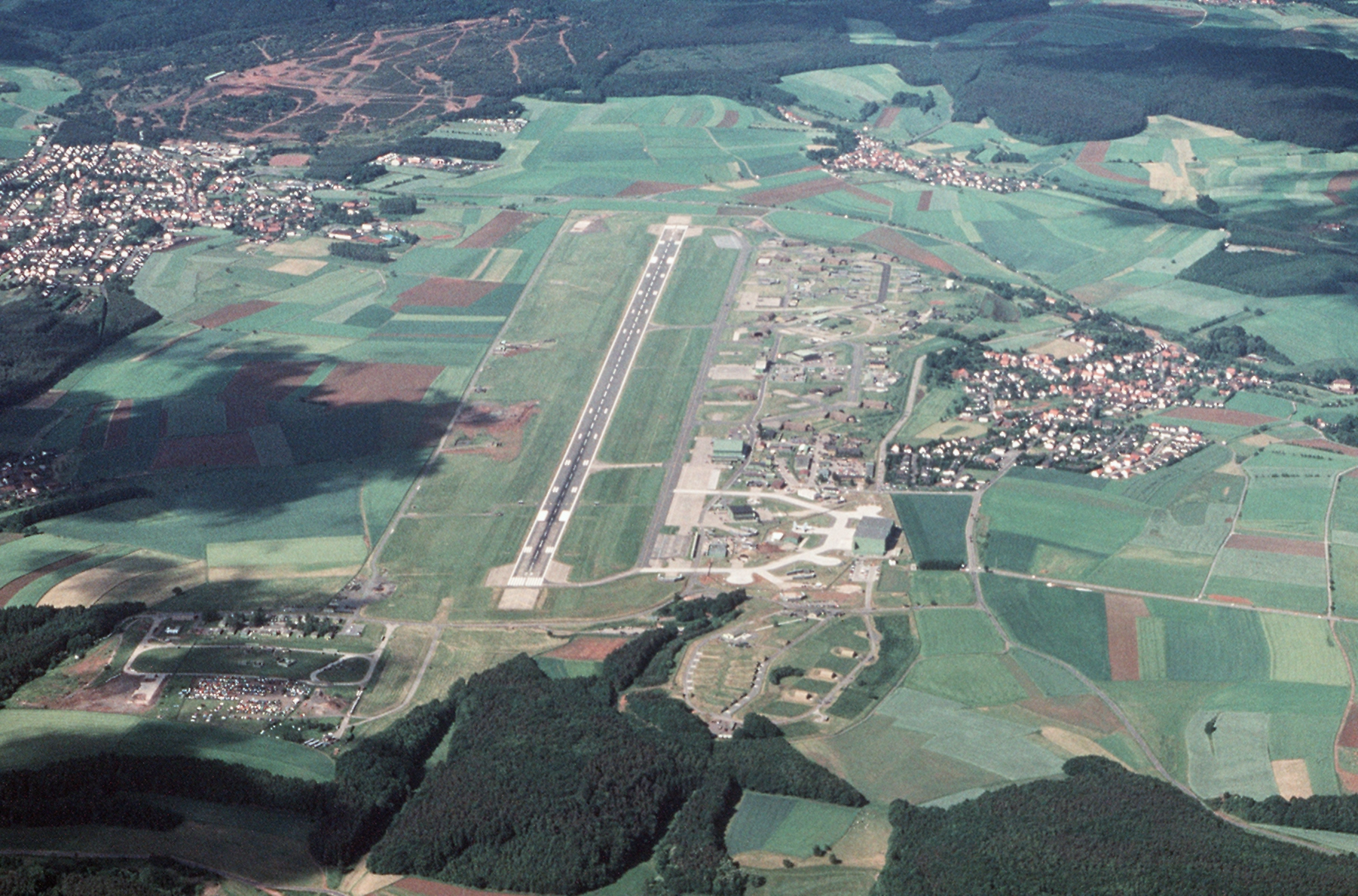
- 1989 Aerial Photo

Site information
- Controlled by: United States Army
- Open to the public: No
- Website: U.S. Army Garrison Rheinland-Pfalz

Location
- Location in Germany
- Coordinates: 49°31′42″N 7°51′57″E

Site history
- Built: 1951
- In use: 1951–present
- Events: Cold War

Garrison information
- Garrison: U.S. Army Garrison Rheinland-Pfalz
- Occupants: AFN Europe; U.S. Army Europe Band; 10th AAMDC; MRC-Europe; 68th Medical Group; U.S. Army NATO Brigade; 18th Military Police Brigade; 30th Medical Brigade; U.S. Army Corrections Facility-Europe

Sembach Kaserne (lit. 'Sembach Barracks') is a United States Army post in Donnersbergkreis, Germany, near Kaiserslautern. It is approximately 19 miles (31 km) east of Ramstein Air Base. From 1995 to 2012 the installation was a United States Air Force installation known as Sembach Air Base, until it was transferred to the United States Army. Prior to 1995 it was known as Sembach Air Auxiliary Field.

Named for the municipality of Sembach, it is the home of AFN Europe, U.S. Army Europe Band, 10th Army Air and Missile Defense Command, Medical Readiness Command-Europe, 68th Medical Group, U.S. Army NATO Brigade, 18th Military Police Brigade, 30th Medical Brigade, United States Army Corrections Facility-Europe, DoDEA Europe, and AAFES Europe, Africa, and Southwest Asia. During the Cold War, the installation housed a variety of U.S. tactical reconnaissance, close air support and tactical air control units as a front line NATO air base.

== History ==
=== Origins ===
Sembach Kaserne's origins date back to 1919 after World War I when French occupation troops used the eastern half of the present flightline as an airfield. The French facilities consisted of 10 sheet-iron barracks and 26 wooden hangars with canvas coverings.

As part of the general withdrawal of French occupation forces from the left bank of the Rhine in 1930, the French abandoned the airfield on June 15, 1930. After the French withdrawal, the land was returned to farmers and used as a hayfield.

In 1939, the German Luftwaffe ordered that the area be reserved for use as a fighter base. Because of the brevity of the French campaign in the first year of the Second World War, the area was returned to the farmers to be used as a pasture in June 1940.

=== NATO Acquisition ===
In 1950, as a result of the Cold War threat of the Soviet Union, the United States was rapidly expanding its air forces, announcing an increase in the number of combat wings from 48 in 1950 to 95 by June 1952.

In March 1951, German surveyors visited the area in the company of French officers. The local farmers protested the construction of a hard-surface airfield which would entail the loss of much of their land, and they demonstrated in Mainz, the capital of the Rhineland-Palatinate. Despite this vigorous opposition, the French occupational authorities began the construction of a modern airfield at the end of June 1951.

Many workers were brought in to build the new base, and the village of Sembach took on the character of a boomtown. Construction continued around the clock through the use of nighttime illumination. The pouring of the 8,500-foot concrete runway was begun early in September 1951 and was finished by the end of the month. The taxiways were completed by the close of the year.

Although the air base was constructed in the French Zone of Occupation under French direction, it was built to be used by NATO forces and was, moreover, intended to be an American air base from the beginning. On 1 September 1951, U.S. authorities officially took over the construction site from the French and named it Sembach Air Auxiliary Field.

During the remainder of the winter, the control tower, hangars, repair shops and other buildings were built along the taxiway. With the building of munitions bunkers to the east of the flightline and a road connecting the taxiway to the B-40 in April 1952, the construction of the flightline area was finished.

In the middle of April 1952, the residents of Sembach learned that the land to the north of the now completed flightline was to be used for the construction of multi-story barracks and office buildings. On April 22, officials began to survey the land that was to be built upon.

The farmers joined forces and forcibly hindered the surveyors, injuring one of them. On April 23, 1952, the Chief of the State Chancellery personally visited Sembach and promised the farmers that he would do all that he could to protect their rights. The Sembach farmers were not convinced, and on 28 April, they again denied the surveyors entrance to their fields.

Despite these efforts, the land was successfully surveyed in August 1952. In September, the Minister President of the Rhineland-Palatinate announced that the government had offered an alternative to the site for the planned construction. Shortly afterward, the French occupation authorities agreed to build on the Heuberg, a sandy area of comparatively little agricultural value located approximately a mile from the flightline.

With this announcement, and everyone being satisfied, Sembach became a center of activity once more, and construction of the administrative area of the base began in October 1952. Over 2500 workers worked day and night operating bulldozers, dump trucks and cement haulers. The barracks and administrative buildings were completed in the spring of 1953.

=== USAF use ===
==== 66th Tactical Reconnaissance Wing ====
US Air Force Europe shield

The American flag first flew at Sembach Air Base on 8 July 1953. On that day, at 1045 hours, the first of 18 RB-26 Invader aircraft belonging to the 66th Tactical Reconnaissance Wing (TRW) landed on the new flightline, arriving from Shaw Air Force Base, South Carolina. With the arrival of the 66th TRW, the installation was renamed Sembach Air Base. Major General B. C. Struther, commander of Twelfth Air Force, welcomed the Wing. The Wing Commander landed at 1509 hours in a T-33 Shooting Star, bringing the remainder of the wing's aircraft with him: 32 RF-80 Shooting Stars and 4 additional T-33s.

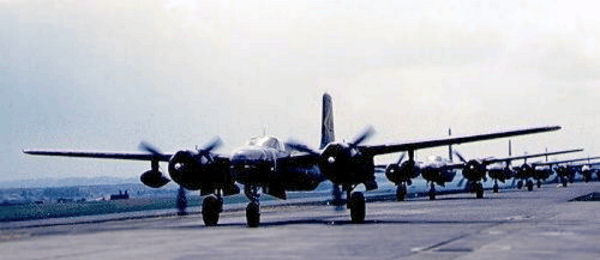
Night Reconnaissance Douglas A/B-26C-45-DT Invaders of the 30th Tac Recon Squadron on the taxiway, Sembach Air Base, 1953

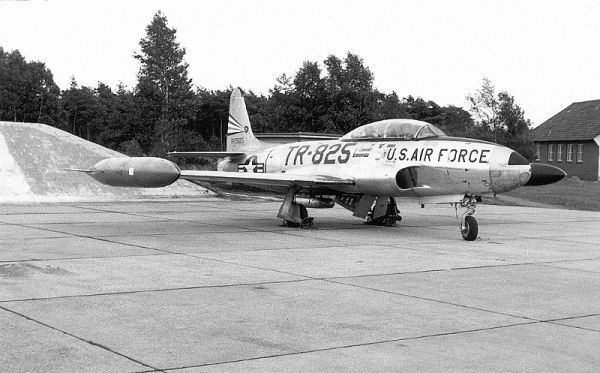
Lockheed F/RF-80C-10-LO Shooting Star 49-1825 of the 302d Recon Squadron at Sembach, 1953

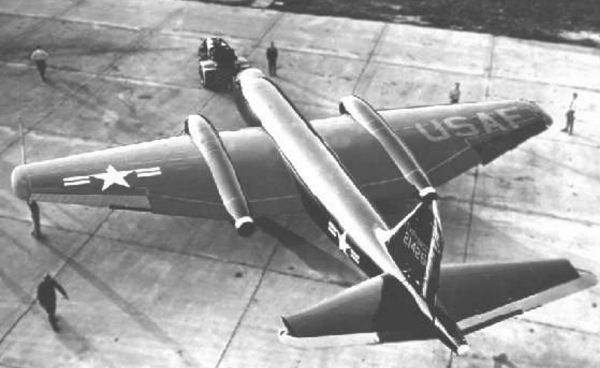
Martin RB-57A-MA 52-1426 of the 30th Tac Recon Squadron, November 1954. This aircraft is on permanent display at the Yankee Air Museum, near Ypsilanti, Michigan

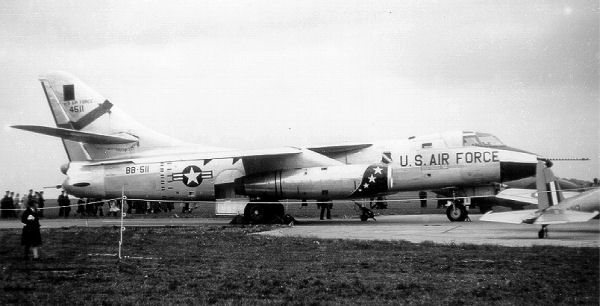
Newly arrived Douglas RB-66B-DL Destroyer serial 54-0511 of the 30th TRS, 1957

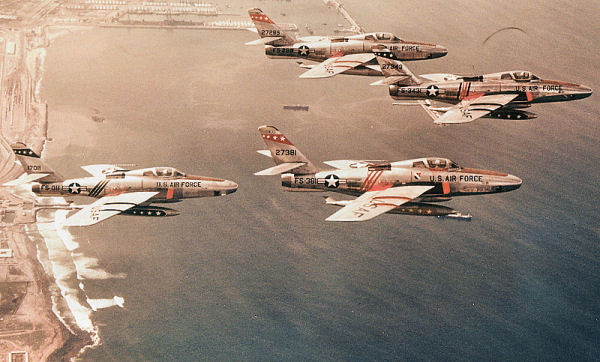
Republic RF-84F-25-RE Thunderflashes of the 66th Tactical Reconnaissance Wing flying over the coast of Morocco near Nouasseur Air Base, 1958. Identified serials are 51-17011, 52-7318, 52-7343 and 52-7295. All of these aircraft were sold to the German Air Force. 17011 was later sold to the Greek Air Force and 7381 to the Italian Air Force. 17011 is now on permanent display at the Hellenic Air Force Museum, Dekelia AB, Athens.

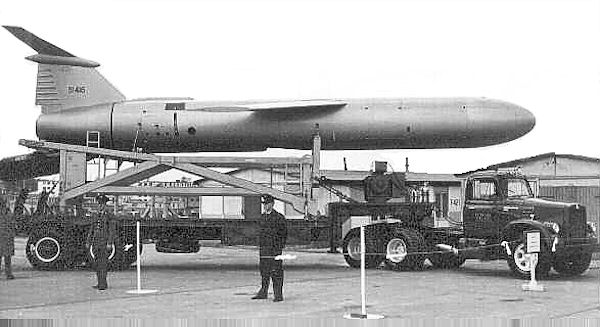
A TM-76A (MGM-13A) Mace Missile, 1963

The 66th TRW had three operational squadrons: the 30 Tactical Reconnaissance Squadron, 302 TRS and 303 TRS. The 30th TRS flew the RB-26, while the 302d and 303d flew the RF-80A.

The third and final phase of construction at Sembach Air Base was conducted in the summer of 1954 when the housing area was built.

On 30 November 1954, the 30th TRS received the first Martin RB-57A Canberra, to replace its World War II vintage RB-26 Invaders. In August 1955, the 302d and 303d TRS started to receive the Republic RF-84F Thunderflash.

On 1 January 1957, a fourth squadron, 19 TRS, was transferred from the 47th Bombardment Wing (Strategic Air Command) at RAF Sculthorpe to the 66th TRW. The 47th TRS flew the RB-45C Tornado, however, the squadron remained at Sculthrope and did not physically transfer its assets to Sembach. At Sculthorpe, the 19th TRS transitioned to the Douglas RB-66 Destroyer.

In February 1957, the RB-57s of the 30th TFS at Sembach were also being replaced by the RB-66. The heavier RB-66s did not land well on Sembach's runway, however, so the 30th TRS was deployed to Landstuhl AB (now Ramstein AB) for their operations.

As 1957 progressed, USAFE HQ decided to reorganizes its tactical reconnaissance assets. Both the 66th TRW and the 10th Tactical Reconnaissance Wing at Spangdahlem Air Base were flying dissimilar types of aircraft: the RF-84F and the RB-66. This was counterproductive not only in terms of operational efficiency, but also in terms of maintenance and supply.

On 6 December 1957, USAFE HQ transferred the 19th and 30th TRS and their RB-66s to the 10th TRW. In return, the 32d and 38th TFS at Phalsbourg AB, France were transferred from the 10th TRW which made the 66th TRW a four-squadron RF-84 wing. However, due to space restrictions at Sembach, the 32d and 38th would remain in France, as a separate detachment of the 66th.

In January 1958, it was announced that the 66th TRW would transition to the RF-101 Voodoo. In addition, the poor flying weather of the German winter was causing an excessive amount of operational delays due to the inclement weather. The 66th was directed to utilise Nouasseur AB, Morocco to its limits in detachments of USAFE aircraft.

At Nouasseur, all training missions were accomplished as required. The very favourable North African weather provided the ideal environment in which new pilots could be transitioned on to the squadron aircraft in the minimum of time. In addition, the 66th TRW used Nouasseur to transition all its pilots onto the RF-101C aircraft.

In July 1958, the 66th TRW was transferred from Sembach to Laon Air Base, France. This move was in accordance with USAFE's plan to realign the posture of various bases in anticipation of the 66th's pending aircraft conversion to the RF-101.

Another reason for the move to France was the unsuitability of Sembach's runway, which was barely adequate for the RF-84, but absolutely unsuitable for the higher performance RF-101 aircraft.

==== 38th Tactical Missile Wing ====
After the departure of the 66th, Sembach was taken over by the 7127th Support Group in June 1958, as a 'placeholder' unit. The 38th Tactical Missile Wing, originally activated at Hahn Air Base, Germany, 18 June 1958, assumed its new headquarters at Sembach Air Base, Germany, including all supporting squadrons and the 38th TMW Hospital on 29 August 1959, becoming the first operational missile base in the U.S. Air Force.

The 38th TMW was originally composed of three Tactical Missile groups: the 585th Tactical Missile Group at Bitburg AB, the 586th Tactical Missile Group at Hahn AB, and the 587th Tactical Missile Group at Sembach AB, in addition to a headquarters unit. The Tactical Missile Groups were inactivated 25 September 1962 and the 38th TMW assumed direct control of all squadrons. The 38th TMW was composed of launch and maintenance squadrons at detached and remote installations at Sembach, Hahn, and Bitburg air bases in Germany, in addition to being the host wing at Sembach.

The 38th Tactical Missile Wing had the distinction of maintaining two separate weapons systems, not once, but twice. First, by bringing the TM-76 Mace "A" operational in August 1959, while maintaining the TM-61C Matador combat ready until September 1962. Later, the Mace "A", later re-numbered to MGM-13A, remained operational until 1966, concurrently with the hard site TM-76 Mace "B", brought operational in June 1964 at Bitburg with the 71st TMS. The 38th TMW won the U.S. Air Force Outstanding Unit Award twice during its activation at Sembach.

The 38th TMW inactivated in September 1966, and its missiles were returned to the United States. The 2d Mobile Communications Group moved to Sembach Air Base in November 1966 from Toul-Rosières Air Base, France, after the French withdrawal from NATO's integrated military force structure.

The 603d Air Base Wing was activated after the departure of the 38th to administer Sembach Air Base and to perform a mission of support for the 601st Tactical Control Group (TCG) and the 7th Air Commando Squadron. The 601st TCG had been stationed at Sembach Air Base since its activation on 15 February 1965. The 7th Air Commando Squadron had moved to Sembach from Eglin Air Force Base, Florida in March 1964 and left Sembach in 1968.

==== 601st Tactical Air Control Wing ====
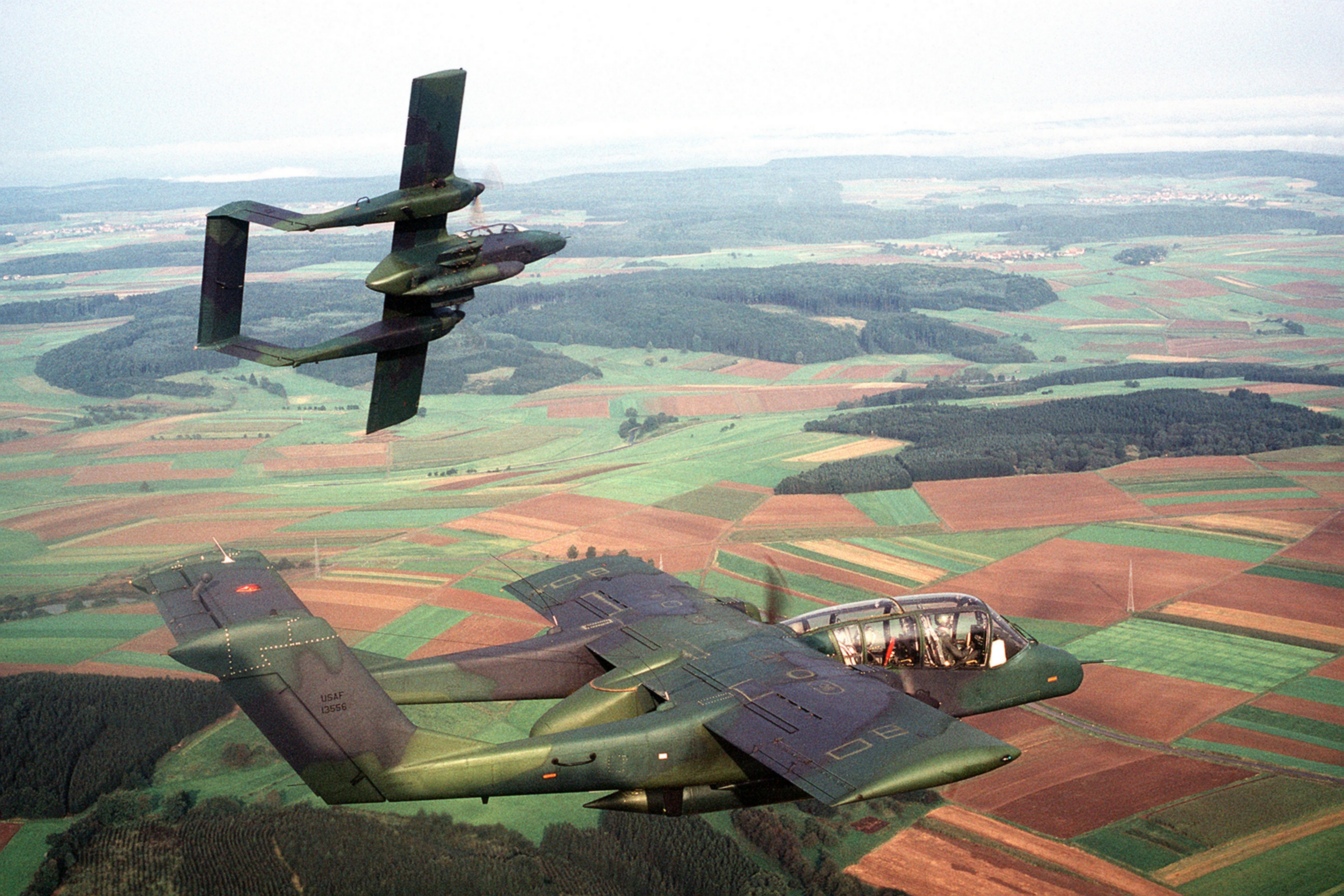
601st TCW OV-10As during Reforger '82.

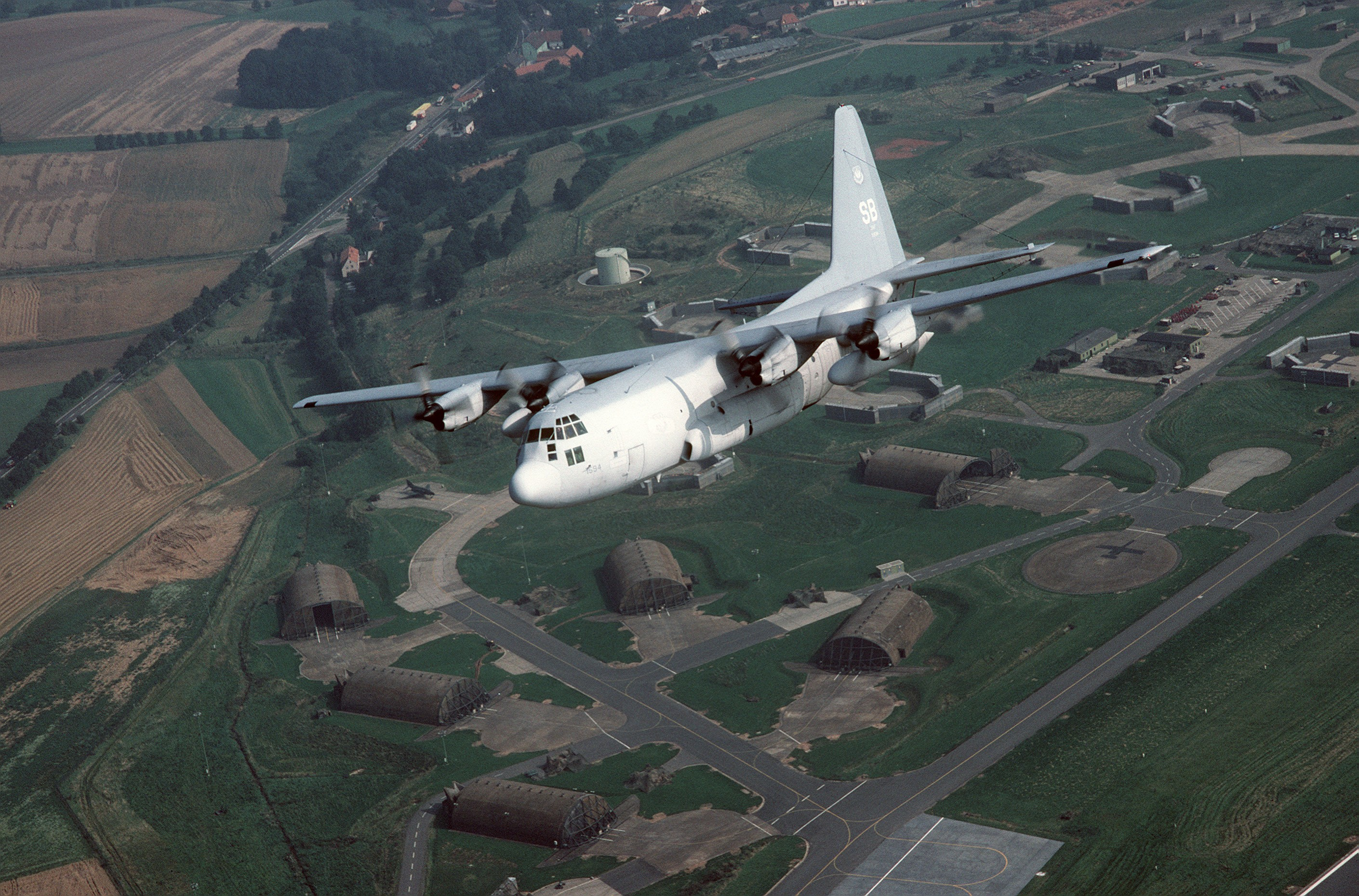
A 43rd Electronic Combat Squadron EC-130H Compass Call over Sembach, 1987.

The 601st Tactical Air Control Wing (TCW) was activated on 1 July 1968, absorbing the mission of the 603rd ABW.

The 601st CSG assumed the new wing's secondary mission of operating the base and of performing the base support functions, except for the brief two-year period (1973–75) when the 7400th Air Base Group ran the base, until 1 June 1985.

At this time, the 601st underwent major wing reorganization. The then current 601 TCW structure was divided into the 65th Air Division Staff with two subordinate wings, the 66th Electronic Combat Wing and the new 601st Tactical Control Wing. As such, the newly created 66th ECW was assigned host wing responsibilities previously held by the 601st TCW. In any event, the 601st CSG was redesignated the 66th CSG with responsibilities of operating the base and providing the base support function for both the 66th ECW and the 601st TCW.

Headquarters Seventeenth Air Force was moved to Sembach AB on 5 October 1971, from Ramstein Air Base.

In 1973, the 601st was notified of its relocation to Wiesbaden AB, however, on 8 August 1975, under Project Creek Swap, the Wing was notified it would again have to pack its bags and move back to Sembach. In January 1976, the 601st began its move en masse back to Sembach Air Base, and by 31 March 1976, the move back to Sembach was complete.

At various times, the 66th's air defense mission not only included the most modern air control radar systems available, but also the O-2 Skymaster and OV-10 Bronco aircraft for forward air control purposes and CH-53 helicopters for mobility support.

An A-10 Thunderbolt II forward operating location was established when Det 1, 81st Tactical Fighter Wing was activated on 1 September 1978, from RAF Bentwaters, UK. Revetments and a dozen hardened aircraft shelters were built and A-10 operations began in May 1979.

The OV-10As were sent back to the United States in 1984, and the helicopters were transferred to special operations units in 1988.

The 601st wide range of communications, which had its beginnings in World War II, was heavily tasked in support of operations during Operation Desert Storm and Operation Provide Comfort, starting with the early buildup in the Persian Gulf during August 1990.

One item of communications-electronic equipment that was used in the many deployments and exercises throughout central and northern Europe was the AN/TRC-97A Radio Set, which was maintained by Wideband Maintenance Equipment Repairmen. This set was very versatile because it provided line of sight, point to point communications in the German countryside. The TRC-97 was widely used over a period of many years, but it was eventually replaced by a digital, less maintenance intensive, AN/TRC-170 Radio Set.

The 601st air control units became an Operations Group in March 1992 that resulted in the formation of the 601st Support Wing. In 1993, more than half the 601st air control assets deployed to Italy in support of Operation Deny Flight, the United Nations sponsored operations that established a no-fly zone over Bosnia-Herzegovina.

The Operations Group was inactivated in October 1993, when the Support Wing was redesignated as the 601st Air Base Wing. At the time, the wing was responsible for over 40 geographically separated units in combination with over 200 people deployed to more than a dozen locations worldwide.

In 1995, the Sembach flightline was returned to German control. The site then became an annex of Ramstein Air Base and was renamed Sembach Annex. In the summer of 1998, the German government started to dismantle the airfield runway, returning the ownership of the airfield area to local governments. The remaining facilities of Sembach AB are situated 2 miles (3.2 km) away from the former airfield, with only a few tenant units remaining.

=== 66th Electronic Combat Wing ===
On 1 June 1985, the 66th was reactivated again at Sembach AB, West Germany as the 66th Electronic Combat Wing. The 66th ECW trained (43d ECS) Lockheed EC-130 Hercules aircrews at Sembach in the Compass Call mission; administratively controlled (42d ECS) General Dynamics/Grumman EF-111A Raven aircrews based at RAF Upper Heyford, England, and acted as a command and control coordination function for the 52nd FW F-4G & F-16C/D Wild Weasel SAM suppression (SEAD) mission. The 66th provided tactical and electronic combat operations during Operation Desert Storm.

The 66th ECW was inactivated on 31 March 1992.

=== 6914th and 6918th Electronic Security Squadron (ESS) ===
On July 19, 1985, U.S. Air Forces, Europe (USAFE) accepted and approved the Electronic Security Command (ESC) proposal to combine the mobile 6913 ESS and 6918 ESS (located at Sembach) into the 6914th ESS and move the combined unit to the Mehlingen Annex (near Sembach, Germany). On 1 October 1986, the 6918 ESS set up at the Mehlingen Annex and became the 6914 ESS. The 6913th and then the 6914th maintained and operated the mobile Beechcraft RC-12 Guardrail system.

Site deactivation date is unknown.

=== 6919th Electronic Security Squadron (ESS) ===
On 28 March 1986, the USAFE Vice Commander (CV), Major General Martin approved 6919 ESS as the designator for the new ESC COMPASS CALL [mission crew] squadron, and on the same day, USAFE transferred 109 manpower billets to ESC effective 1 October 1986. USAFE agreed to provide ESC all facilities and equipment required to support the USAFE Compass Call mission. The 6919 ESS was activated at Sembach AB, Germany, on 1 October 1986. The 6919th ESS, Sembach, Air Base, Germany, began supporting EC-130 Compass Call operations in late 1986. With the 43rd ECS piloting the aircraft, the 6919th provided electronic combat operations during Operation Desert Storm. On 25 April 1991, the 6919 ESS flew its last operational mission.

The 6919 ESS was inactivated on 21 May 1991.

=== 21st Operational Weather Squadron ===
The 21st Operational Weather Squadron (OWS) provides weather support for all US Air Force and Army in the European and Africa (USAFE) Commands.

- Sembach Air Station, Germany, Headquarters USAFE (1 December 1997 – 23 April 2012)
- Kapaun Air Station, Germany (23 April 2012 – Present)

Due to the fact that Sembach Air Station and Kapaun Air Station are only 14.2 miles away from each other in Germany, the 21st OWS decided to run their organizational guidon from their old office at Sembach Air Station to their new one on Kapaun Air Station April 20, 2012 just 3 days before the United States Air Force handed Sembach Kaserne back over to the United States Army.

== Sembach AB USAF Patch Collection ==
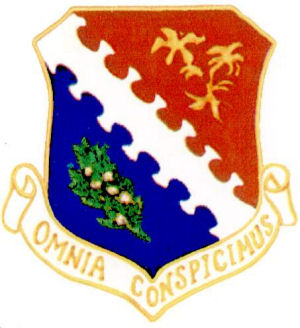
66th TRW & ECW Emblem

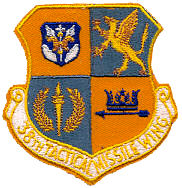
38th TMW Emblem

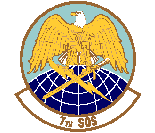
7th SOS Emblem

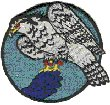
822nd TMS Emblem

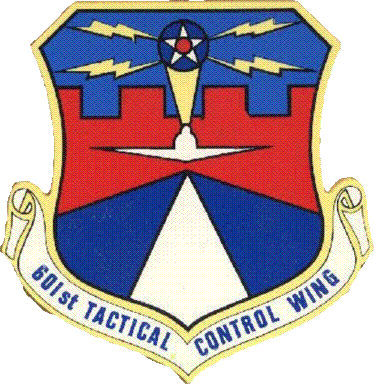
601st TCW Emblem

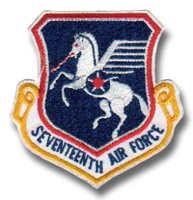
17th AF Emblem

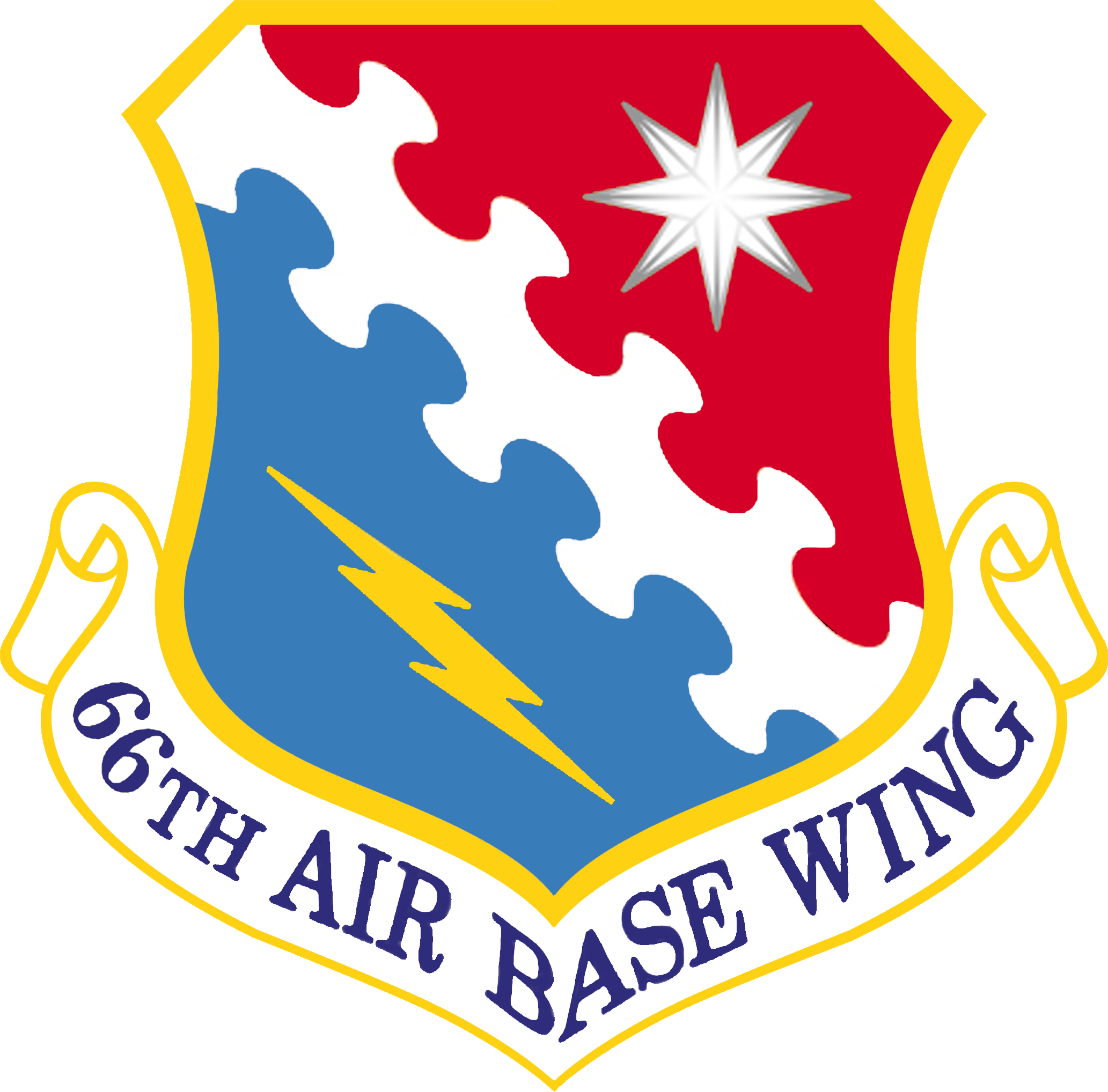
66th ABW emblem

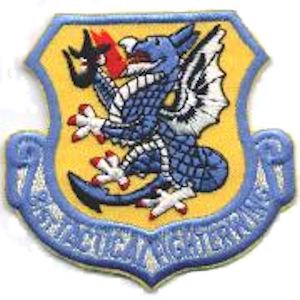
81st Tactical Fighter Wing Emblem

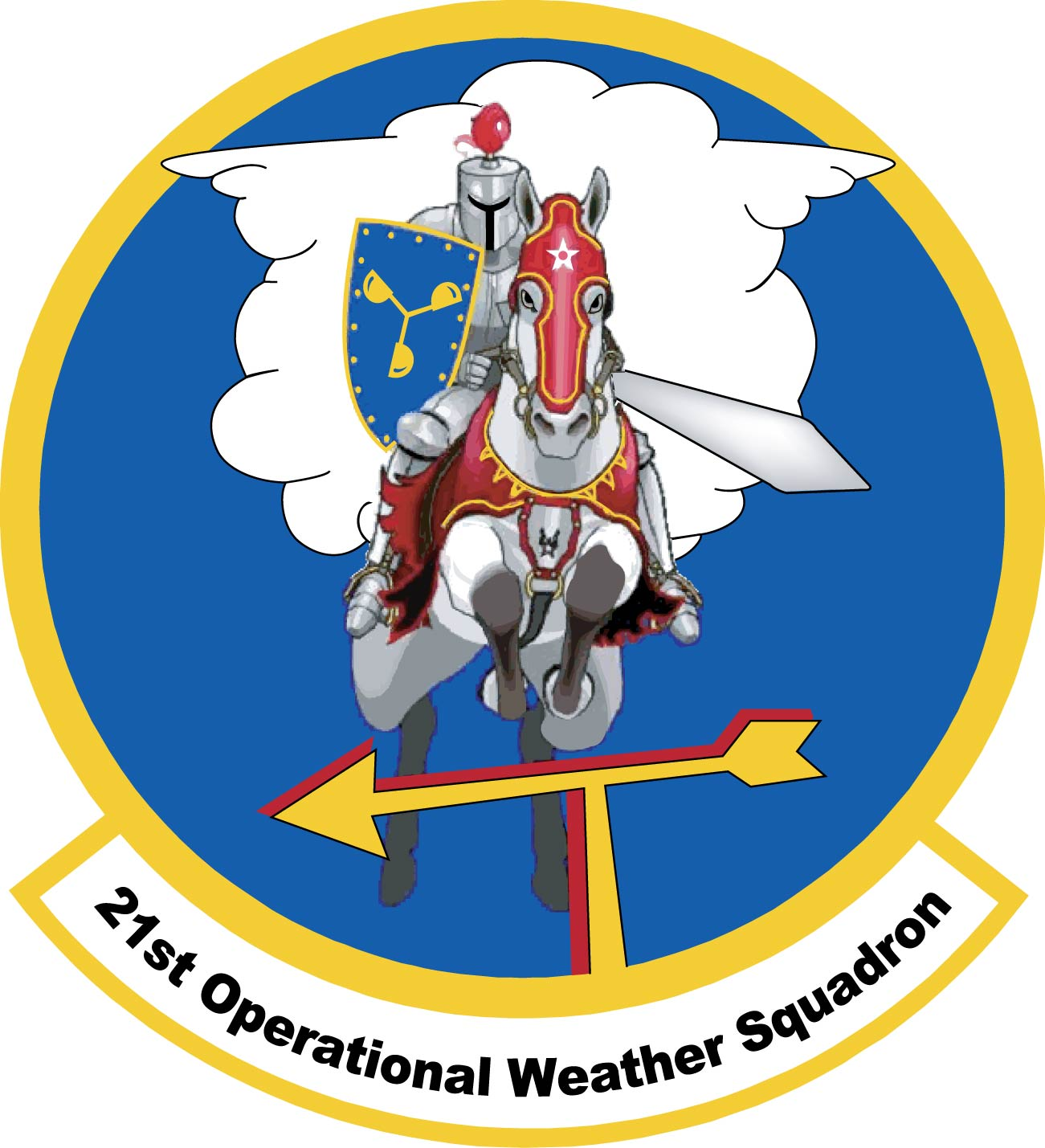
21 Operational Weather Sq emblem

== USAF aircraft/missiles formerly assigned to Sembach AB ==
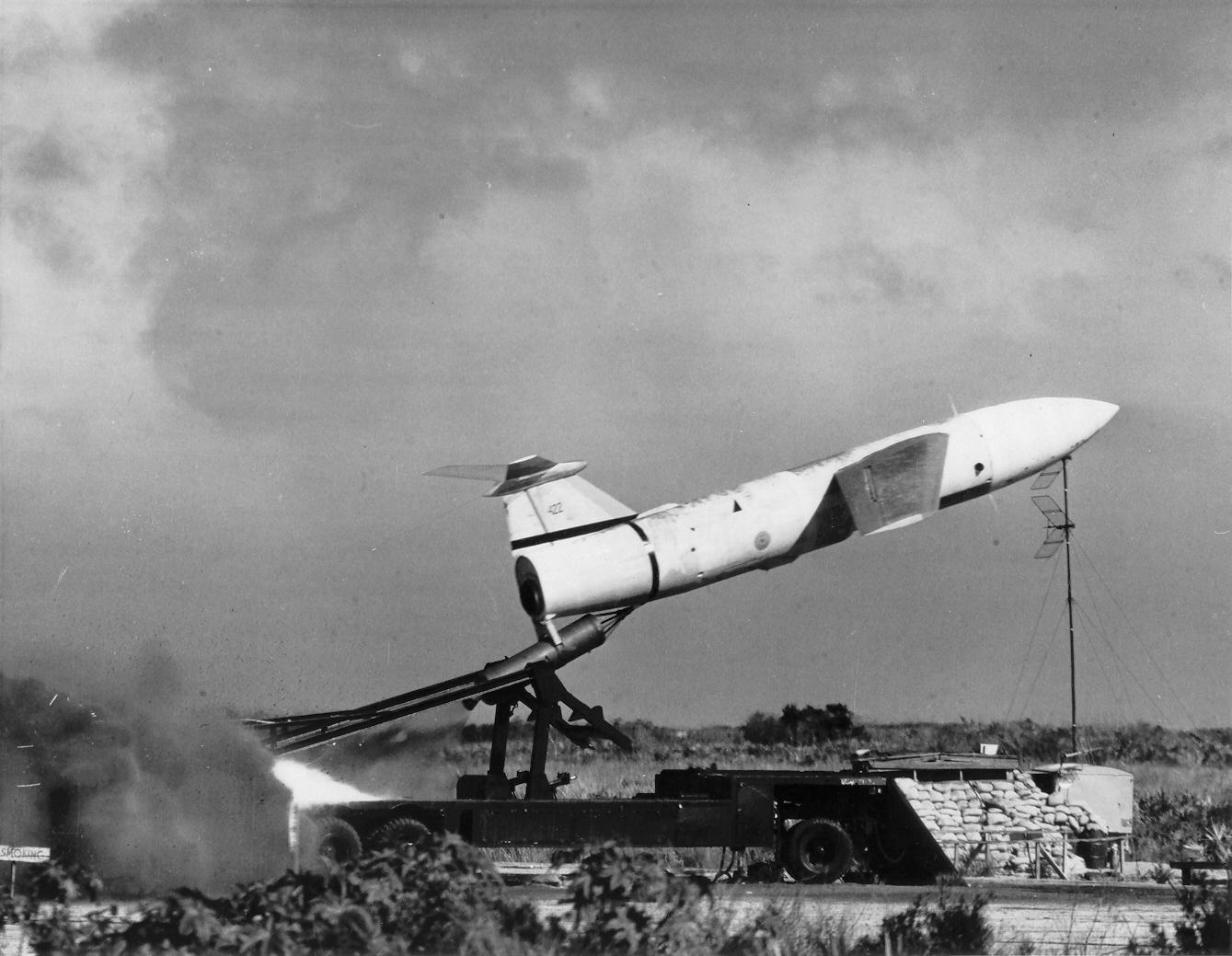
Matador Missile

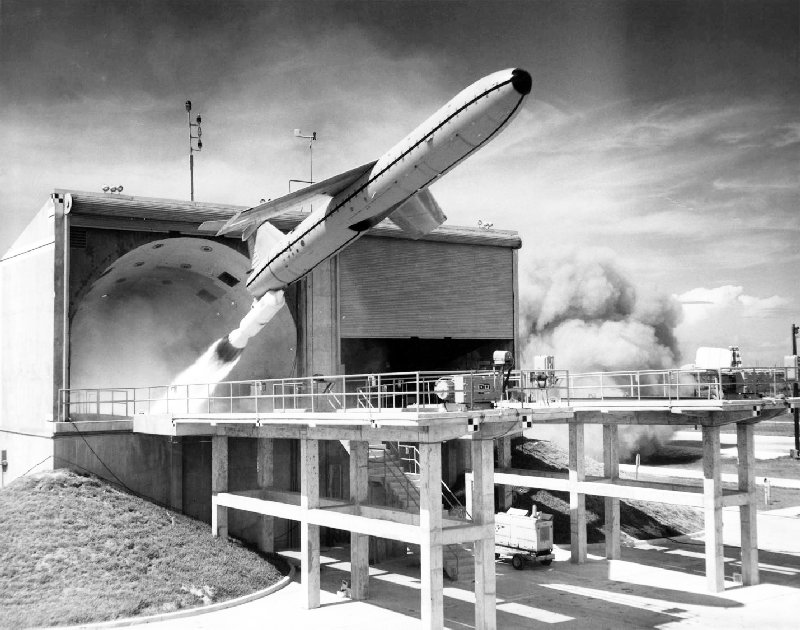
MACE Missile The Hard Site Mace B stationed at Bitburg

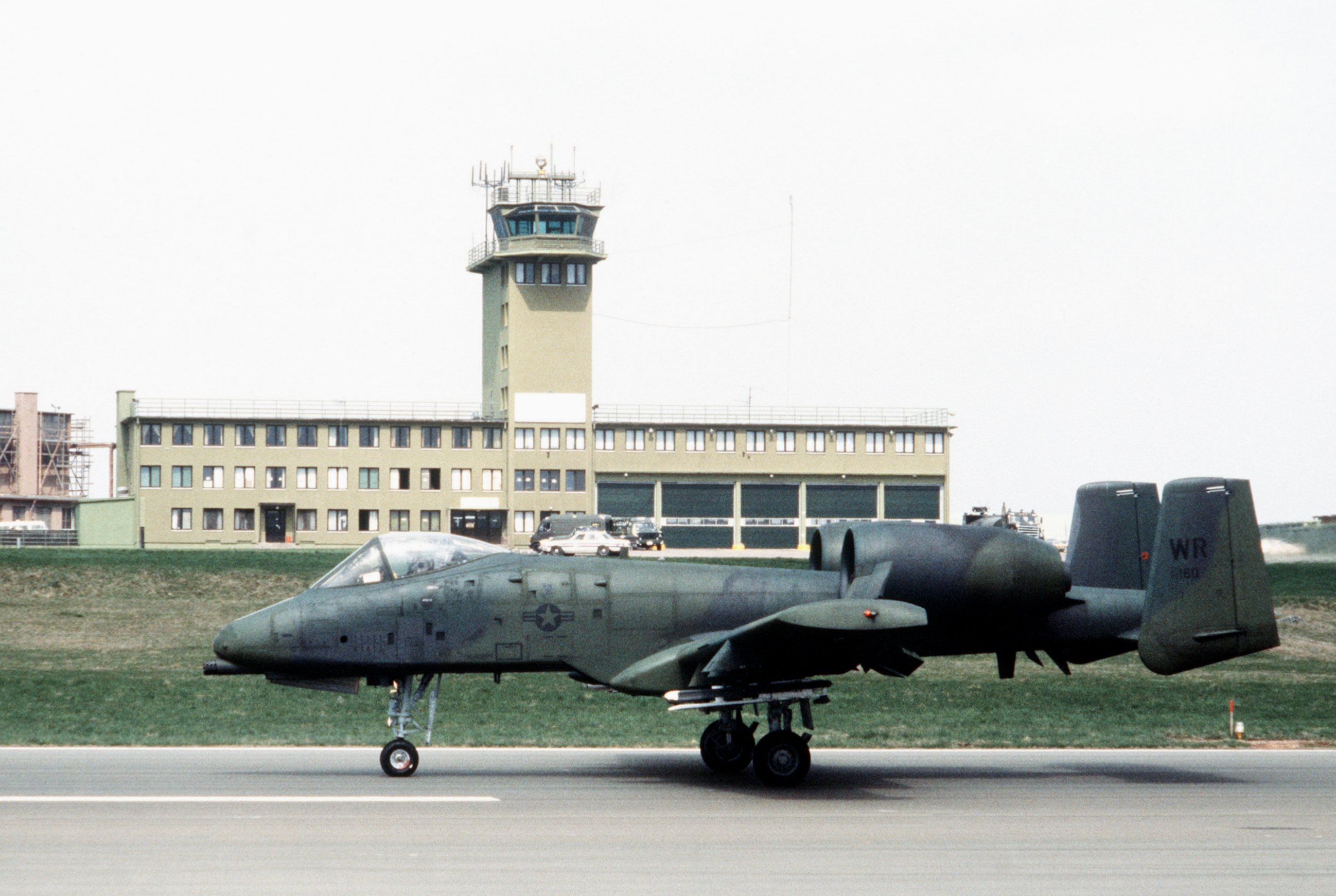
An 81st TFW A-10A at Sembach, 1982

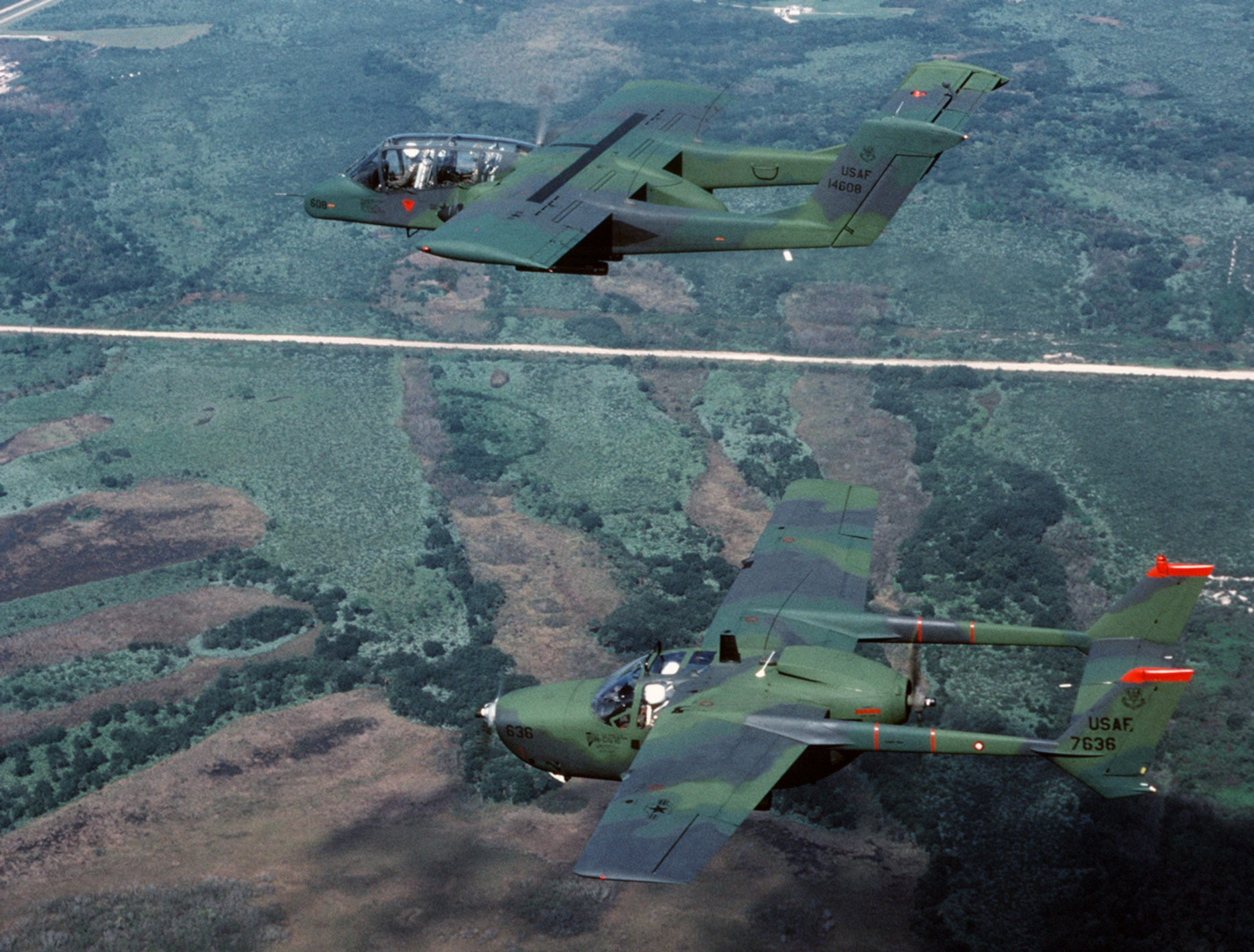
O-2A and OV-10A, 1984
