= NATO Communications and Information Systems School =

The NATO Communications and Information Systems School (NCISS)is a school run by NATO that provides formal technical training on certain Communication and information Systems (CIS) deployed on operations or exercises by the Alliance.

NCISS operates as a training establishment for both NATO Strategic Commands and since 2004 it is responsible to the NATO CIS Services Agency (NCSA), in consultation with Allied Command Transformation (ACT). It is located in Oeiras, Portugal.

== Historical notes ==
NCISS was created in 1959 as a Contractor Training Facility to conduct ACE HIGH instruction. It was hosted at an Italian Air Force Base in Latina. The school later became NCISS.

In January 1963 Supreme Headquarters Allied Powers Europe (SHAPE) assumed full control of NCISS. It recruited NATO civilian instructional staff to replace those of the civil contractor. In 1964 the NGISS training responsibility was extended into the area of Command and Control with the introduction of the "Status, Control Alert and Reporting System" (SCARS). The facility at this time was named the "SHAPE Centralised Training Facility" (SCTF). A further expansion occurred in the early 1970s with the addition to the training curriculum of Satellite Communications (SATCOM).

In April 1974 SCTF was changed to "NATO Communications School Latina" (NCS). To satisfy the increasing requirements arising from NATO's Integrated Communications System (NICS) concept, a new training facility was initiated in 1976. This project called for a facility comprising a training and administrative building and a separate student accommodation block. The new complex was opened in 1983. It enabled the School to take on additional training associated with NICS such as TARE, IVSN and TCF, and allowed the School to cater for future developments within NATO CIS.

The School entered the area of Officer Training in the late 1970s with courses for NATO CIS Staff Officers, Officers CIS Orientation, Communications Security Officers and ADP Site/Terminal Area Security Officers.

In 1989 the School was renamed "NATO Communications and Information Systems School" (NCISS). With the introduction and increased use of specific Command and Control Information Systems within NATO, a requirement arose for software engineering and programming. In the 1990s the School entered ADP, project management and information systems training, part of it being offered as off-site courses throughout NATO Europe.

In October 1994, the first CIS Officers' Course for Cooperation Partner (CP) Nations was conducted at Latina. . The School successfully introduced Computer Assisted Training (CAT) modules on all its courses and analyzed the parameters for future contractor produced CAT and Advanced Distributed Learning (ADL) programmes.

In 2004 the NATO CIS Services Agency (NCSA) was established with the mission to ensure the provision of secure "end-to-end" information exchange services required for NATO Consultation, Command, and Control (NC3) functions, using fielded communications and information systems in the most cost-effective manner, and the School was put under its organisation.

== School organization ==
- NCISS Commandant - This post is assigned to an Italian Air Force Colonel. However, in the past it was covered also by Officers from other Nations. The name Commandant was first adopted when Mr Robert J. Pinoteau, a contractor first and then a NATO civilian who was a former French Navy Commandant, was appointed as the first Training Facility Director, in 1964. Since then, also when in 1971 the School was under the responsibility of the first military Colonel (Col. RNLA Theodore De Bie) the name has remained, also because, being the School hosted on an Italian Air Force Base, in Italian language the appointment of the Head of a Military Body is pronounced "Comandànte".
- Chief of staff and command group - They are responsible of the coordination of the activities assigned to the two Branches of the School, and take care of the planning and policy, either for works and for the training aspects. Additionally they also manage the System Approach to Training (SAT) methodology.
- Training branch - Core business of the School, the Training Branch is responsible for all training aspects at NCISS. It is composed of a Training Management office, responsible for the student administration, and the instructors are divided into some specific Subject Matter Expert Pools.
- Support branch - Its area of responsibility covers mainly financial, logistics, security, Information Technology and Personnel aspects.

== Training ==
NCISS provides advanced formal training to military and civilian personnel from the NATO Nations and PfP/MD/ICI to operate and maintain NATO Communications and Information Systems on NATO CIS.

Additionally, it conducts orientation courses and management training on NATO CIS for selected (Staff) personnel and contributes to NATO projects for training related matters. Recently, with the introduction of e-learning methodology, the School has also expanded the way training is delivered, associating the newly born Advanced Distributed Learning (ADL) to the traditional theoretical training in the classrooms and the practical hands-on in the laboratories. Furthermore, even more requested is the off-site training, especially in Theatre of Operations, and the training on deployable, transportable and scalable systems, that is unavoidably the most flexible and efficient answer for the future of NATO operations.

The courses, covering both static systems and deployable communications equipment, are subject to continuous development and improvement to meet the new tasks assigned to NATO in Out-of-Area contingency operations, with emphasis on mobility and interfacing with national defence networks.

NCISS's offers more than 90 different courses and over 370 sessions are scheduled. The courses, of various duration up to 6 weeks, range from the Communication area (SATCOM, DLOS, COM Systems, BME/NCN, Video Tele Conferencing, etc.), to the Information Systems (Functional Area Sub-Systems, MCCIS, AIFS, Geo-spatial IS, WISE, etc.), and the Security on Communications/AIS (Compusec, Information Assurance, Crypto, PTC, Cyber Defense, etc.) or simply on specific equipment (Fiber Optics, Crypto Devices, HF Radios, etc.) or even tailored on particular requirements (e.g. Frequency Management for Theatre of Operations, etc.).

The School response to NATO exercises and especially to SFOR, KFOR and ISAF operations, some of which even with short notice, was decisive for the deployment of qualified technicians and engineers in the new Theatres of Operation. Consequently, the overall student throughput is in continuous increase by a factor of about 15-20% a year.
