= Donington on Bain =

Village and civil parish in the East Lindsey district of Lincolnshire, England

Coordinates: 53.328830°N 0.145374°W

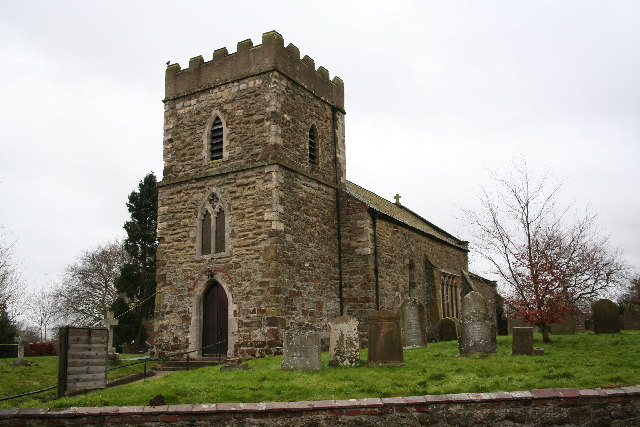
- Church of St Andrew, Donington

- Location within Lincolnshire
- Population: 368 (2011)
- OS grid reference: TF236829
  - London: 125 mi (201 km) S
- District: East Lindsey
- Shire county: Lincolnshire
- Region: East Midlands
- Country: England
- Sovereign state: United Kingdom
- Post town: Louth
- Postcode district: LN11
- Police: Lincolnshire
- Fire: Lincolnshire
- Ambulance: East Midlands
- UK Parliament: Louth and Horncastle

Donington on Bain is a village and civil parish in the East Lindsey district of Lincolnshire, England.

The village is approximately 6 miles (10 km) south-west from Louth and 6 miles (10 km) north from Horncastle, and is on the east bank of the River Bain, and in the Lincolnshire Wolds, an Area of Outstanding Natural Beauty. The Viking Way runs north to south through the village. Cadwell Park racetrack is approximately 4 miles (6 km) to the east.

Donington on Bain Grade II" listed late 12th-century Anglican parish church is dedicated to St Andrew. It is of Early English style with an early Norman font. Within the church is a 17th-century memorial to the poet Thomas Kent. The church is in the Asterby Group subdivision of the South Wolds Group of churches of the Horncastle Deanery. The village primary school and the Black Horse public house are on Main Road.

On either side of the valley sits a tower. It was reported in June 2009 that one of these, the tallest structure in the UK, Belmont mast, was to be reduced in height. The other is a Second World War Chain Home Radar tower at RAF Stenigot.

Donington on Bain railway station served the village from 1875 to 1951.

Donington on Bain Rovers F.C. existed on a casual basis from at least 1922 until 1948. It played in the East Lincs Combination from the date of its foundation until the club folded in 2014. Home matches were played from the late 1980s until 2014 at Donington Park on Station Road, a pitch "they had created... from scratch without any cost to the council".
