= US Army NATO Brigade =

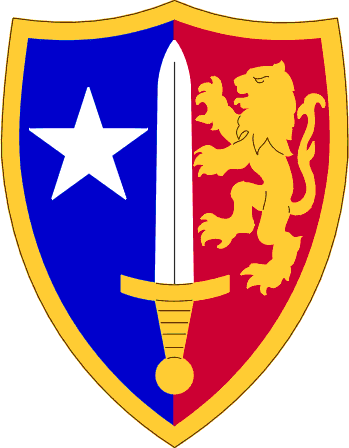
- Shoulder Sleeve Insignia
- Active: 1990 - present
- Country: United States
- Allegiance: United States Army Europe and Africa
- Branch: United States Army
- Type: Training
- Size: Brigade
- Part of: Supreme Headquarters Allied Powers Europe
- Garrison/HQ: Sembach, Germany
- Website: https://www.usanato.army.mil/

Commanders
- Current commander: Col. Jeremiah D. Pope
- Command Sergeant Major: CSM James E. Morris Jr.

Insignia
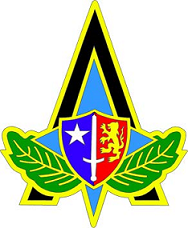
- NATO Brigade DUI

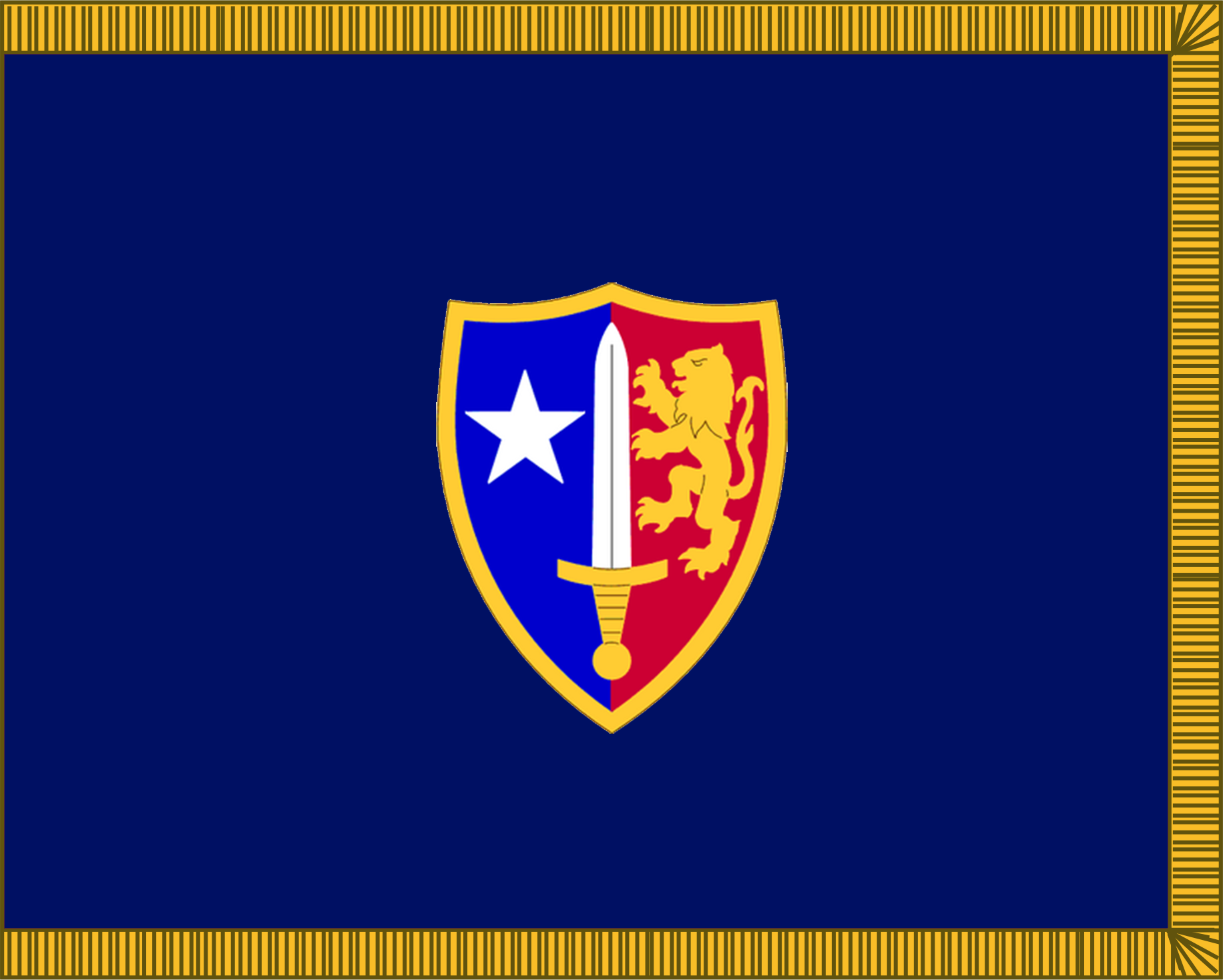
- US Army NATO Brigade Flag

The United States Army NATO Brigade (USANATO) is a US Army brigade providing training, logistics, human resources, and service-specific support at 81 US Army NATO locations across 21 countries. The brigade headquarters is based in Sembach in Germany.

== Organization ==
- US Army NATO Brigade, in Sembach (Germany)
  - Headquarters and Headquarters Company, USANATO, in Sembach
  - Allied Forces North Battalion (AFNORTH), in Casteau (Belgium)
    - Headquarters and Headquarters Company, AFNORTH BN, in Casteau
    - Alpha Company, AFNORTH BN, in Brunssum (Netherlands) — supporting Allied Joint Force Command Brunssum
    - Bravo Company, AFNORTH BN, in Casteau – supporting Allied Command Operations
    - Charlie Company, AFNORTH BN, in Szczecin (Poland) — supporting Multinational Corps Northeast
  - Allied Forces South Battalion (AFSOUTH), in Lago Patria (Italy)
    - Headquarters and Headquarters Company, AFSOUTH BN, in Lago Patria
    - Alpha Company, AFSOUTH BN, in İzmir (Turkey) — supporting Allied Land Command
    - Bravo Company, AFSOUTH BN, in Lago Patria – supporting Allied Joint Force Command Naples
    - Charlie Company, AFSOUTH BN, in Norfolk (Virginia) — supporting Allied Command Transformation

== Locations ==
=== Allied Forces North Battalion ===
Allied Forces North Battalion is providing support to US Army personnel deployed at the following NATO commands:

- Belgium
  - Allied Command Operations, in Casteau
  - NATO Communications and Information Agency, in Brussels
- Czech Republic
  - Joint Chemical, Biological, Radiological and Nuclear Defence Centre of Excellence, in Vyškov
- Estonia
  - NATO Force Integration Unit, in Tallinn
- France
  - Rapid Reaction Corps – France, in Lille
  - Eurocorps, in Strasbourg
- Germany
  - I. German/Dutch Corps, in Munster
  - Allied Air Command, in Ramstein Air Base
  - Military Engineering Centre of Excellence, in Ingolstadt
- Hungary
  - NATO Force Integration Unit, in Szekesfehervar
- Latvia
  - NATO Force Integration Unit, in Riga
- Lithuania
  - NATO Force Integration Unit, in Vilnius
- Netherlands
  - Allied Joint Force Command Brunssum, in Brunssum
  - NATO Communications and Information Agency, in Brunssum
- Norway
  - Joint Warfare Centre, in Stavanger
  - NATO Communications and Information Agency, in Stavanger
- Poland
  - Multinational Corps Northeast, in Szczecin
  - Joint Force Training Centre, in Bydgoszcz
  - Multinational Division Northeast, in Elbląg
- Slovakia
  - Explosive Ordnance Disposal Centre of Excellence, in Tencin
- United Kingdom
  - Allied Rapid Reaction Corps, in Innsworth
  - Joint Electronic Warfare Core Staff, at RNAS Yeovilton
  - NATO Communications and Information Agency, at Northwood Headquarters

=== Allied Forces South Battalion ===
Allied Forces South Battalion is providing support to US Army personnel deployed at the following NATO commands:

- Bulgaria
  - NATO Force Integration Unit, in Sofia
- Greece
  - NATO Rapid Deployable Corps – Greece, in Thessaloniki
- Italy
  - Allied Joint Force Command Naples, in Naples
  - NATO Rapid Deployable Corps – Italy, in Solbiate Olona
  - NATO Communications and Information Systems School, in Latina
  - NATO Modelling and Simulation Centre of Excellence, in Rome
  - 2nd NATO Signal Battalion, at Grazzanise Air Base
  - Alliance Ground Surveillance Squadron, at Sigonella Air Base
  - NATO Communications and Information Agency, in Naples
- Portugal
  - NCI Academy (NATO Communications and Information Academy), in Oeiras
- Romania
  - Multinational Division Southeast, in Bucharest
  - NATO Force Integration Unit, in Bucharest
- Spain
  - NATO Rapid Deployable Corps – Spain, in Valencia
  - Counter Improvised Explosive Devices Centre of Excellence, in Madrid
- Turkey
  - Allied Land Command, in İzmir
  - NATO Rapid Deployable Corps – Türkiye, in Istanbul
  - Defense Against Terrorism Centre of Excellence, in Ankara
  - NATO Communications and Information Agency, in İzmir
- United States
  - Allied Command Transformation, in Norfolk
  - NATO Communications and Information Agency, in Norfolk
