= United States Army Corrections Facility-Europe =

Department of Defense

Coordinates: 49.5638°N 8.47633°E

United States Army Regional Correctional Facility – Europe (USARCF-E) is the only Department of Defense, Level 1 corrections facility in the European and African theaters and is located at Sembach Kaserne, Germany.

USACF-E falls up under the 18th MP BDE. At the same time reports directly to the United States Army Corrections Command in Alexandria, Virginia.

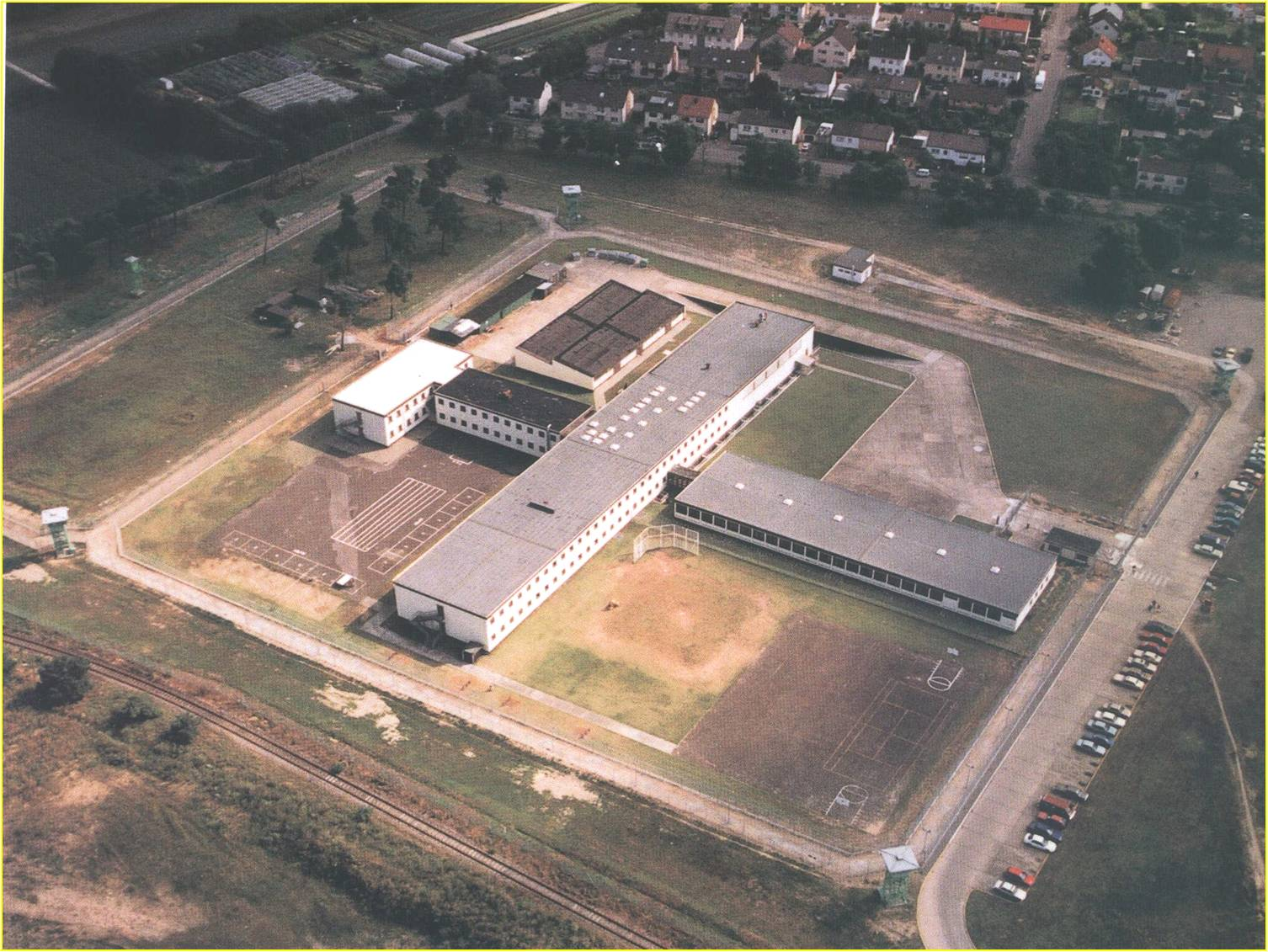
Aerial view of USACF-E

== Mission statement ==
The United States Army Regional Correctional Facility-Europe provides level 1 pre-trial and post-trial correctional services, conducts prisoner transfers to Contiguous United States (CONUS) correctional facilities, and on order provides advisory teams in support of full spectrum operations.

== Organization structure ==
The USARCF-E staff primarily consists of Army soldiers assigned to the 18th Military Police Brigade. These soldiers are joined by several members of the Air Force and the Navy who serve as the liaisons for their respective service personnel incarcerated within the facility and also assist in the daily operations of the facility. The staff is rounded out by both Department of Army civilians and local national employees.

== History ==
A previous confinement facility was located on the outskirts of Coleman Army Airfield in Mannheim, Germany. In anticipation of realignment of US forces in Europe, all facilities in Mannheim were to be closed, and a replacement facility was planned in Sembach. The new confinement facility opened on Sembach Kaserne in 2014.
