= NATO Communications and Information Systems Services Agency =

Former agency of the North Atlantic Treaty Organization (NATO)

NATO Communication and Information Systems Services Agency
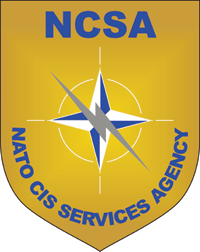
- Shield of NCSA
- Type: NATO agency
- Headquarters: Mons, Belgium
- Website: http://www.ncsa.nato.int/

The NATO Communication and Information Systems Services Agency (NCSA), was a service provider to its NATO and national customers. Wherever NATO deployed on operations or exercises, NCSA was there, providing communication and information systems (CIS) services in support of the mission. Equally important, NCSA supported NATO's ten major headquarters in Europe, North America, and Asia.

In 2012, as part of a NATO reorganization, NCSA was deactivated and major elements were realigned to create a portion of the NATO Communications and Information Agency (NCI Agency) and to create the NATO Communication and Information Systems Group (NCISG). NCI Agency provides NATO network core enterprise services, operational and exercise support, and program management. NCISG, aligned under Allied Command Operations, provides deployable communication and information systems to forward deploying elements of the NATO command structure and NATO joint task force headquarters.

== History ==
The NATO Communication and Information Systems Services Agency (NCSA) had a long gestation which began in the 1970s and metamorphosed into various NATO organisations along the way.

The first identifiable communications and information distribution organization was called the NATO Integrated Communications Systems Central Operating Authority (NICS-COA) and was established to control, operate and maintain the NATO Communication systems of that time. The main elements of these systems were the Initial Voice Switched Network (IVSN), Telegraph Automated Relay Equipment (TARE), Status Control Alerting and Reporting System (SCARS), SATCOM systems and equipment and the Allied Command Europe Highband ("ACE High") Tropospheric Scatter trunk communication network. By the early 1990s due mainly to the arrival of new systems and new technology it became necessary to reorganize the Communication and Information systems support for NATO. This coincided with major reductions of the NATO Military Command Structure to take advantage of the "peace dividend" after the fall of the Berlin Wall. In 1993 the NATO Communication and Information Systems Operating and Support Agency (NACOSA) was formed by the integration of functions previously undertaken by NICS-COA and some elements of the Communications and Information Systems Division of the Supreme Headquarters Allied Powers Europe (SHAPE CISD). Over time it became apparent that there was still a need for establishments to streamline their operations to improve management and control and also to make a manpower saving of some 25% so NACOSA also took command of 4 subordinate elements. These were the Integrated System Support Centre (ISSC), Allied Command Europe Communications Security (ACE Comsec) (which later became INFOSEC Command NACOSA), The NATO Communication and Information Systems School (NCISS) at Latina, Italy and the Regional Signal Group SHAPE. In the following years, NACOSA developed into an organization with responsibilities for the operation and support of communication and information systems on both sides of the Atlantic and for all NATO Operational deployments.

In 1997 due mainly to the arrival of new systems and technology, but also as a result of lessons learned in areas like the Balkan Operations, the expansion of NATO, the introduction of Partners for Peace, and the NATO Long Term Study, NACOSA was reorganized once more. An additional result of this reorganization was to bring the previously named Regional Operating Centre Northwood (UK) under direct control as a subordinate element to be known as The NACOSA Support Element (NSE) Northwood. The Charter for NACOSA at that time was redefined and signed by the NATO Consultation Command and Control Board (NC3 Board) in December 1997. This Charter persisted until October 2003, when, after a comprehensive study, the North Atlantic Council was moved to endorse the following recommendations: - All of NATO's fragmented CIS service provision elements will be integrated into one centralised organisation, separating ‘customers‘ from ‘suppliers‘. - All deployable CIS capabilities will be combined in two NATO Signal battalions and become part of NCSA. - The new organisation will be an agency and remain under non-operational direction of the NC3 Board. The Director NCSA should be accountable to the NC3 Board for executing the Agency's general policy decisions, directives and strategy, and for the provision of CIS services to all its "customers".

Under these guidelines the NCSA was designed and it formally took over responsibility from the decommissioned NACOSA on 1 August 2004. At the same time NATO's new Command Structure was implemented, cutting approximately 12% of NATO's overall manpower. The transition period is assumed to last about 18 months, i.e. until mid-2006.

A formal NCSA Activation Ceremony took place at SHAPE on 7 September 2004. Acting on behalf of the Secretary General, the Presiding Officer was the then Deputy Supreme Allied Commander Europe, Admiral Rainer Feist.

== Tasks ==
NCSA provided core tasks, such as:

1. Operating, maintaining, controlling and administering the central components of NATO's networks, providing coverage of mission essential systems 24 hours a day, 7 days a week.
2. Providing strategic and policy advice to headquarters' leadership to ensure the efficient and effective use of CIS resources.
3. Providing secure and non-secure computer, telephone and video conference services to NATO's static headquarters.
4. Ensuring the compatibility of new CIS hardware and software on NATO's networks.
5. Providing technical advice; installing computers, telephone and video conference equipment; conducting hardware and software maintenance; configuring and controlling networks; and providing training for personnel on NATO communication and information systems.

== Location in NATO’s structure ==
NCSA was part of the NATO Consultation, Command and Control Organization (NC3O), reporting to the North Atlantic Council. NCSA worked very closely with the NATO Consultation, Command and Control Agency (NC3A), whose mission was to provide NATO with scientific support and common funded acquisition of Consultation, Command, Control, Communications, Intelligence, Surveillance and Reconnaissance (C4ISR) capabilities.

The Director of NCSA was accountable to NATO's Consultation, Command and Control Board for executing the general policy decisions, directives and strategy associated with providing CIS services throughout NATO. The Director was also accountable to the Supreme Allied Commander Europe (SACEUR) for all operational, or deployed, CIS assets.

In 2007, Canadian Forces internet sources said that NCSA comprised a central headquarters staff co-located with Allied Command Operations at the Supreme Headquarters Allied Powers Europe in Mons, Belgium; two deployable NATO Signal Battalions, each with four deployable communication modules, comparable in size and mandate to signals companies (including 1st NATO Signals Battalion at Wesel, Germany); ten Sectors that supported the 10 major headquarters in NATO; and the NATO Communication and Information Systems (CIS) School in Latina, Italy.

It appeared in 2011 there was a 3rd NATO Signal Battalion (3NSB), located in Bydgoszcz, Poland, as well as a NATO Signal Regiment.

In 2011, NCSA comprised a central headquarters staff co-located with Allied Command Operations at the Supreme Headquarters Allied Powers Europe (SHAPE) in Mons, Belgium; the NATO Signal Regiment in Brunssum, Netherlands, as well as three deployable NATO Signal Battalions; five Sectors and eight Squadrons that supported the 10 major headquarters in NATO; the NATO Communication and Information Systems (CIS) School in Latina, Italy; the NATO Programming Centre in Glons, Belgium; and the NCSA CIS Logistics Depot in Brunssum. (NCSA website)
