= RAF Stenigot =

Former RAF Base in Lincolnshire, England

RAF Stenigot
- Stenigot, Lincolnshire. in England
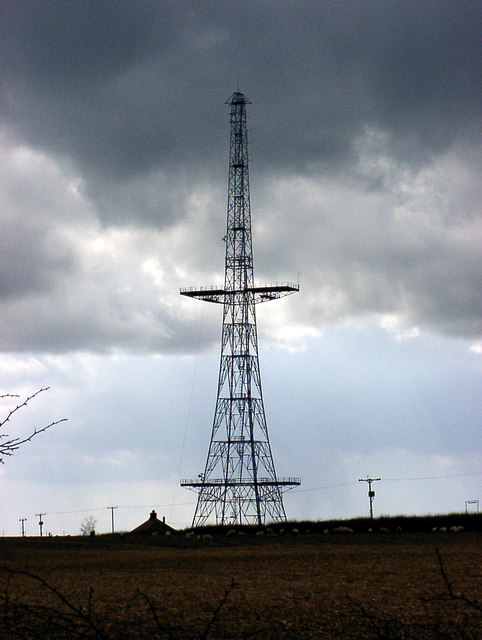
- Chain Home radar tower at RAF Stenigot

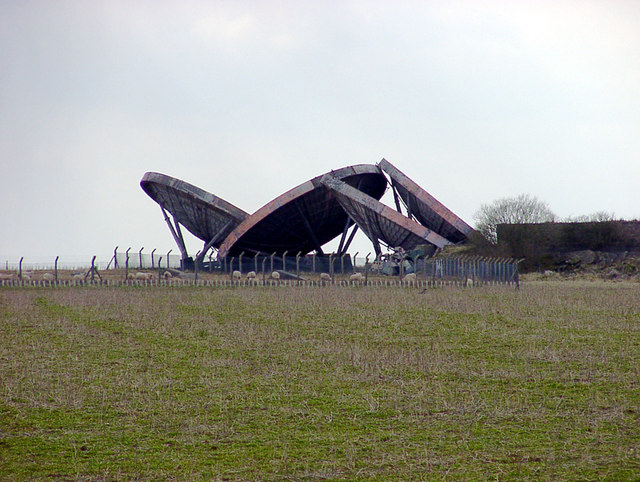
- Abandoned tropospheric scatter dishes, once part of NATO's ACE High communication system, since removed for scrapping.

Site information
- Owner: Ministry of Defence
- Operator: Royal Air Force

Location
- Shown within Lincolnshire
- Coordinates: 53.327°N 0.116°W

Site history
- Built: 1938
- In use: 1939-1996
- Battles/wars: Second World War; Cold War

RAF Stenigot is a former Second World War radar station situated at Stenigot, near Donington on Bain, Lincolnshire.

== Second World War ==
It was built in 1938 by Blaw-Knox as part of the Chain Home early-warning radar network. Initially, the site's main feature was an octet of aerial towers. These were supported by some low-lying buildings.

== Post war ==
The station was upgraded in 1959 to GEE H communications relay site as part of the ACE High programme, which involved adding four tropospheric scatter dishes. The site was decommissioned in the late 1980s and was mostly demolished by 1996.

== Current use ==
The radar tower is a Grade II listed structure because it is the best preserved and most complete Chain Home transmitter tower surviving in its original location in the British Isles. The site is still in use by the RAF Aerial Erector School for selection tests for possible recruits.

Stenigot Tower is also used by various two way radio providers as a common base repeater site due to its vast coverage of Lincolnshire.

=== Demolition of three radar dishes (October 2018) ===
Three of four dishes on site were scrapped in the winter of 2018. A local construction firm admitted to scrapping three of the four dishes; the legality of this is disputed. The first dish was removed from its supports sometime before 14 October, with two more dishes being felled over the following days. The fourth and last remaining dish was removed in mid to end–November 2020.

== See also ==
- List of former Royal Air Force stations
