= NC3O =

Military organization

The NATO Consultation, Command and Control Organization (NC3O) was formed in 1996. Its main objective is to provide a coherent, secure and interoperable C3 capability to North Atlantic Treaty Organization (NATO).

The NATO Consultation, Command and Control Board (NATO C3 Board or NC3B), formed in 1996, acts as a board of directors for the NC3O and as its main policy body.

The NC3B meets every 6 months to review progress within the NC3O's two agencies, the NATO Consultation, Command and Control Agency (NC3A) and the NATO Communication and Information Systems Services Agency NCSA, previously known as NACOSA. The NC3B is supported in its work by the staff within the NHQC3S and the sub-committees.

There are two main parts within the structure supporting NC3O which are on one side the Sub-Committees and, on the other side, the Agencies and support bodies.

The Subcommittees are divided depending on their roles going from the more policy oriented (i.e. SC/1) to the more technically oriented (i.e. SC/7). Every Subcommittee is divided into Working Groups (WGs) or Ad Hoc Working Groups (AHWGs) and every Working Group is divided into Syndicates. When needed, a Subcommittee can create a Syndicate depending directly from itself.

== Structure ==
- NATO C3 Board
  - Agencies and support bodies
    - NC3REPS (National representatives within the NC3O)
    - NC3A
    - NATO CIS Services Agency (NCSA)
    - NATO C3 Staff
    - NATO PKI Management Authority
      - NATO PKI Advisory Cell
  - Subcommittees
    - SC/1 - C3 CC SC (C3 Capability Coherence Subcommittee)
      - WG/1 C3 Policy
      - WG/2 C3 Capabilities
      - WG/3 C3 Interoperability
      - WG/4 NOSWG (NATO Open Systems Working Group)
      - AHWG/1 Maritime C3
    - SC/3 - FMSC (Frequency Management Subcommittee)
      - WG/1 Policy
      - WG/2 Military Frequency
      - WG/3 Technical
    - SC/4 - IA SC (Information Assurance Subcommittee)
      - AHWG/1 Cross-Domain Issues
      - AHWG/2 Technical IA Services
      - AHWG/3 Security Management Infrastructure
      - AHWG/4 Cryptographic Services
      - AHWG/5 Reserved
    - SC/5 - IS SC (Information Services Subcommittee)
      - WG/1 DataLink
      - WG/2 Message Text Formats
      - WG/3 DMSWG (Data Management Services Working Group)
      - WG/4 XMLSWG (XML Management Services Working Group)
      - WG/5 CESWG (Core Enterprise Services Working Group)
    - SC/6 - CNS SC (Communication and Network Services Subcommittee)
      - WG/1 Networking
      - WG/2 SATCOM
      - AHWG/1 BLOS Comms
      - AHWG/2 V/UHF Radio
      - AHWG/3 Secure Multimedia Conferencing
    - SC/7 - IDENT SC (Identification Subcommittee)
      - AHWG/4 NATO Mode and Mode S Identification
      - AHWG/5 Air To Surface Identification
    - SC/8 - NAV SC (Navigation Subcommittee)
      - AHWG NAVWAR
      - AHWG Precision Positioning Systems Certification
