= Allied Command Europe Highband =

NATO communications system (1956–1996)

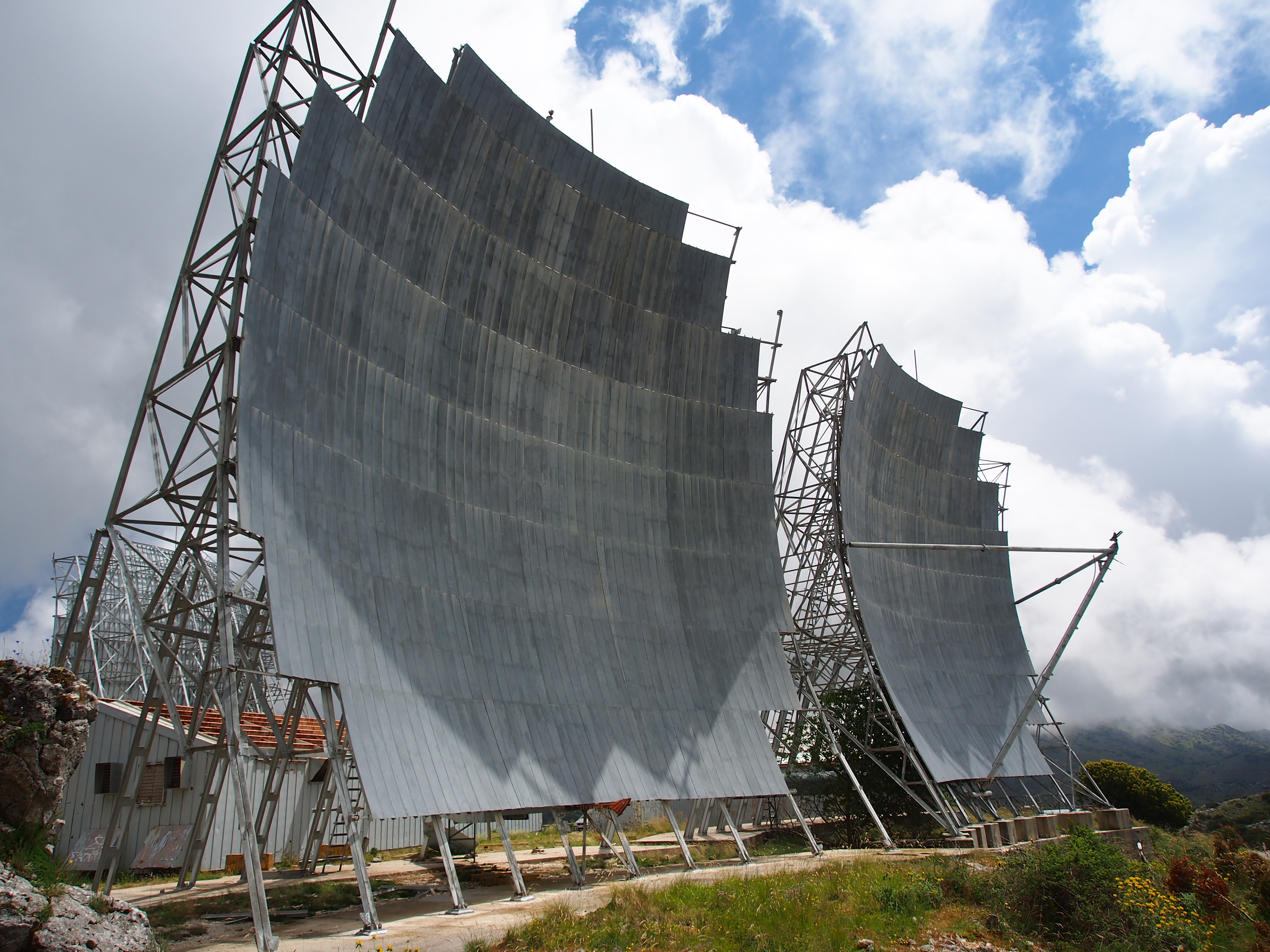
Billboard type troposcatter antennas

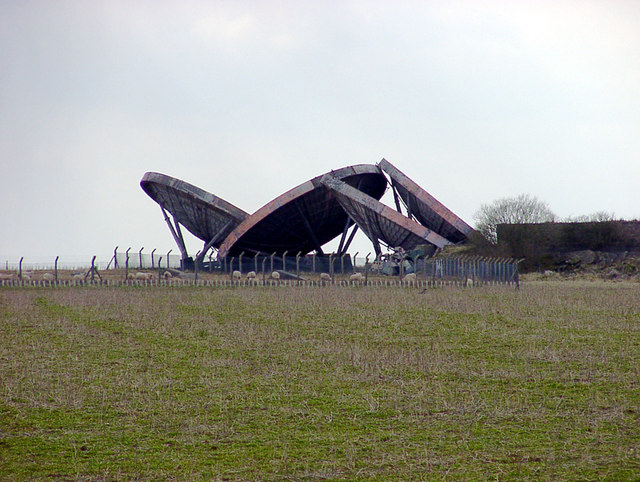
Troposcatter dish array formerly at RAF Stenigot

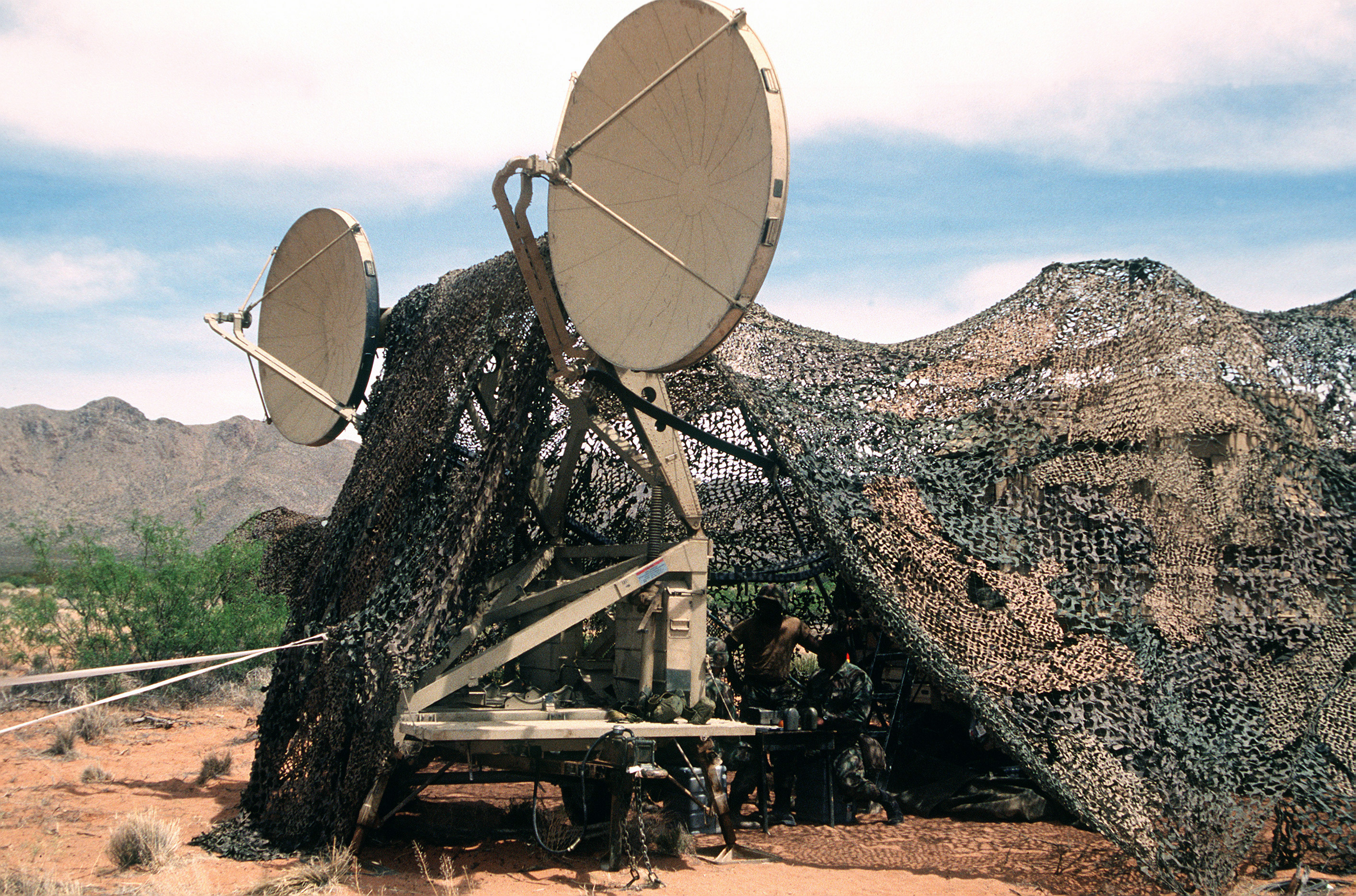
Dish type microwave antennas for mobile troposcatter communication

Allied Command Europe Highband, better known as ACE High, was a fixed service NATO radiocommunication and early warning system dating back to 1956. After extensive testing ACE High was accepted by NATO to become operational in 1964/1965.

The frequency supportability and frequency assignments were provided in accordance with the NATO Joint Civil/Military Frequency Agreement (NJFA). The system was designed to be a combined UHF troposcatter/microwave radio system, providing long-range communications in the form of telephone, telegraph and data traffic in the NATO chain of command.

Its combined services produced over 200 channels and equipment was in place to multiplex them to contain up to 12 different calls each. There used to be 49 troposcatter links augmented by 40 line-of-sight Microwave terrestrial stations, located in nine different NATO countries from northern Norway through central Europe to eastern Turkey. The transmitters broadcast at 832.56 - 959.28 MHz producing an average transmitting power of 10 kilowatts.

== History ==
NATO was established in 1949 with a supreme command (SHAPE) near Versailles, France, and the regional headquarters (RHQ) Allied Forces Northern Europe (AFNORTH) at Kolsås, Norway (responsible for Denmark, Norway and the UK), Allied Forces Central Europe (AFCENT) at Laffaux, France (responsible for Belgium, France, Germany and the Netherlands) and Allied Forces Southern Europe (AFSOUTH) at Naples, Italy (responsible for Italy, Greece and Turkey). Supreme command, the three RHQ's and all subordinate units used various communication systems to establish contact: high frequency radio networks, VHF transmitters and civil or military landlines. All systems had their weakness in equipment reliability, maximum amount of data transferred, encryption possibilities and unauthorized data interception. So in the early 1950s, there existed an urgent need for a reliable, foolproof, long distance European communication network.

US developed tropospheric diffusion techniques, integrated in a new military communications network, appeared to be the solution and in 1956 STC, a planning, design, engineering and installation company was ordered to develop a new integrated communications network in Europe. This network consisted of a number of "backbone" stations covering a 6,800 km (4,200 mi) path from northern Norway to southern Turkey and was initially called the "Over the Horizon Troposperic scatter Communications Net," but was renamed "Allied Command Europe - Highband" (ACE-High). The network was kept operational until the 1990s when all frequency allocations had to be released to civilian authorities.

After all components were installed at their locations by Marconi Electronic Systems, UK in 1961, (from 1968, part of General Electric Company) the ACE-High system was officially transferred to NATO.

In 1966, France, under president Charles de Gaulle, withdrew from NATO integrated military structure (not from the Alliance itself) and systems had to be rerouted from France to Brunssum, Netherlands while the former Primary Control Center at Beauvais, was relocated to Lamersdorf, West-Germany.

In the early 1970s, the first geostationary satellites in the "Satellite Communication" network (SATCOM) were activated, thus expanding the ACE-High system.

The rise of the military SATCOM I-III (1971–1994), SATCOM IV (1995-now) network satellites, Internet routers, and the Central Region Integrated Communication System (CRICS) and the Crisis Response Operations in NATO Operating Systems (CRONOS) made ACE High obsolete. By the end of the 1980s, its replacement was already available but NATO postponed the ACE High phase-out until 1995.

In 1995, the first British NATO SATCOM IV/B satellites were activated and because the ACE-High frequencies had to be released for civil TV and mobile phone usage, NATO decided to deactivate ACE-High in 1996, and the frequencies in the 800 MHz band became available for civilian use again.

== ACE High sites ==
The ACE High network included the following major sites and terminals, but also connected Line of Sight (LOS) microwave links to other networks reaching C2 centres not listed here.

AFNORTH-Norway

- (NC- Senja) > NSEZ

Pos 69°19′44″N 17°29′49″E TX RX Equipment:1 Scatter Line + 2 Radio Line

- (nca - Höggumpen) > NHGZ

Pos 69°04′41″N 18°00′16″E 502 m TX RX Equipment:1 Radio Line

- (ND- Bodö) > NKLZ

Pos 67°10′23″N 15°01′24″E 801 m TX RX Equipment:2 Scatter Line + 1 Radio Line

- (nda - Bodoe Tail - Kletkov) > NVAZ Pos unbekannt

TX RX Equipment:1 Radio Line

- (NE - Mosjöen) > NMOZ

Pos 65°52′41″N 13°18′11″E 627 m TX RX Equipment:2 Scatter Line

- (NF - Trondheim) > NSBZ

Pos 63°18′41″N 10°56′17″E 677 m AMSL TX RX Equipment:2 Scatter Line + 1 Radio Line

- (nfa - Trondheim Tail - Graakallen)

Pos 63°25′15″N 10°15′06″E 543 m AMSL TX RX Equipment:1 Radio Line

- (NG - Oslo AAA) > NSOZ

Pos 60°03′34″N 11°16′09″E 246 m TX RX Equipment:2 Scatter Line + 1 Radio Line

- (Oslo YYY - Svartas) > NVAZ

Pos 68°18′3″N 14°14′16″E TX RX Equipment:3 Radio Line

- (nga - Oslo Tail 01 - Kolsaas) > NKOZ

Pos 59°55′7″N 10°30′58″E TX RX Equipment:1 Radio Line

- (ngb - Oslo Tail 02 - Maakeroy) > NVEZ

Pos 59°09′22″N 10°26′19″E 14 m TX RX Equipment:1 Radio Line

- (NH - Grimstad - Stormyrheia/hørte) > NSMZ

Pos 58°27′19″N 08°27′43″E 326 m TX Rx Equipment:3 Scatter Line

- (NJ - Sola - Lysenut) > NLYZ

Pos 59°31′40″N 05°54′12″E 792 m TX RX Equipment:2 Scatter Line

AFNORTH-Denmark

- (DA - Karup - Torphøj) > DTOZ

Pos 55°52′28″N 09°21′00″E 135 m TX RX Equipment:2 Scatter Line + 1 Radio Line

- (daa - Karup Tail - Lundbakke) > DLUZ

Pos 56°13′49″N 09°09′48″E 68 m TX RX Equipment:1 Radio Line

AFNORTH-United Kingdom

- (EAA - Faroes - Sandfelli 2)
- (EA - Shetlands - Mossy Hill) > UMSZ - Mossy Hill > 59°57′17.15″N 01°18′11.60″W 227 m AMSL
- (eab - Shetlands Tail Relay - Collofirth Hill) > UCOZ - Collafirth Hill > 60°32′00.75″N 01°23′28.30″W 239 m AMSL
- (eac - Shetlands Tail - Saxa Vord) USVZ - Saxa Vord 60°49′37.20″N 00°50′22.59″W 276 m AMSL
- (EB - Aberdeen - Mormond Hill) > UMOZ - Mormond Hill 57°36′11.19″N 02°01′51.86″W 227 m AMSL
- (eba - Aberdeen Tail - Long Haven Hill) > UBUZ - Long Haven Hill 57°27′31.94″N 1°48′46.07″W 95 m AMSL
- (EC - Boulmer - Brizlee Wood) > UBOZ - Brizlee Wood 55°25′05.28″N 1°46′04.26″W 250 m AMSL
- (ED - Binbrook - Stenigot) > UBIZ - Stenigot 53°19′36.08″N 00°06′57.44″E 153 m AMSL
- (EE - London - Coldblow Lane) > UMAZ - Coldblow Lane 51°17′44.95″N 00°36′51.52″E 194 m AMSL
- (eeb - London Tail Relay - Woldingham - RAF Botley Hill Farm)
- (eea - London tail - Hillingdon)
- RAF Uxbridge – local terminus

AFCENT-France

- (FAN - Paris - Mont Florentin) FFLZ - Paris North 49°20′27.59″N 02°03′06.79″E 222 m AMSL
- FTAZ - Taverny 49°02′02.88″N 02°13′45.85″E 178 m AMSL
- (fac - Paris Tail (2)- Sant Germain) 48°54′44.67″N 02°01′25.44″E 71 m AMSL
- (fae - Paris Tail (2) - Extension (SHAPE) 48°50′34.19″N 02°06′14.30″E 178 m AMSL
- (fa - Relais Paris - Emeville) FEMZ - Emeville 49°18′01.83″N 03°00′41.00″E 247 m AMSL
- (faa - Paris Tail (1) - Laffaux) 49°27′15.05″N 03°24′57.39″E 143 m AMSL
- (fad - Relay Paris - Rozoy Bellevalle) FRBZ - Rozoy Bellevalle 48°55′56.05″N 03°28′24.62″E 219 m AMSL
- (FAS - Paris - Mont Aout) FAOZ - Paris South 48°46′14.78″N 03°53′25.33″E 216 m AMSL
- (FA - Trier - Rohrbach) FROZ - Rohrbach 49°03′18.47″N 07°14′40.74″E 376 m AMSL
- (fay - Trier Tail - Kindsbach) ABHZ - Kindsbach 49°23′48.11″N 07°35′38.32″E 458 m AMSL
- (FC - Lyon - Pierre sur Haute) FLYZ - Lyon 45°39′11.52″N 03°48′33.07″E 1632 m AMSL
- (FD - Nice - Signal de la Chens) FNIZ - Nice 43°44′53.67″N 06°39′44.85″E 1703 m AMSL

AFCENT-Netherlands

- HBRZ - Brunssum 50°56′19.11″N 05°58′35.60″E 95 m AMSL TX equipment 1S + 1R
- HMAZ - Maastricht 50°50′25.05″N 05°39′33.78″E 82 m AMSL TX equipment 1S +2R

AFCENT-Belgium

- BADZ - Adinkerke
- BCAZ - Casteau Supreme HQ Allied Powers Europe Pos 50°30′05.56″N 03°58′15.69″E 87 m AMSL TX Equipment 2S +2R
- BCHZ - Chievres Pos 50°35′7.75″N 3°48′59.84″E TX Equipment 2S +2R
- BFRZ - Baraque de Fraiture 50°15′07.94″N 05°43′56.13″E 654 m AMSL TX Equipment 3R

AFCENT-Germany

- ABHZ - Kindsbach 49°23′51.24″N 07°35′41.17″E 458 m ü. NN
- (AA - Emden - Aurich) AEMZ - Aurich 53°30′32.04″N 07°26′34.83″E 10 m ü. NN
- (AB - Moenchengladbach - Roetgen) ALAZ -Lammersdorf 50°39′57.59″N 06°17′14.58″E 593 m ü. NN
- (abb - Moenchengladbach Tail (1) - Hehn) AHEZ - Hehn 51°10′51.44″N 06°23′37.77″E 81 m ü. NN
- (aba - Moenchengladbach Tail (2) - Millen) 50°45′57.87″N 05°33′47.26″E 151 m ü. NN
- (abc - Uedem) AUEZ - Uedem 51°39′39.08″N 06°16′58.97″E 47 m ü. NN
- AFEZ - Feldberg 47°52′23.09″N 08°00′59.73″E 1458 m ü. NN

AFSOUTH-Italy

- IDGZ - Dosso dei Galli 45°51′13.66″N 10°22′32.28″E 2174 m AMSL
- IVTZ - Verona Tail ( im West Star Bunker ) 45°33′17.89″N 10°45′46.83″E 334 m AMSL
- (IA - Livorno - Monte Giogo) IMXZ - Livorno 44°19′17.38″N 10°07′30.94″E 1496 m AMSL
- (IAZ - Cavriana - Monte Bosco Scuro) IMBZ - Cavriana 45°21′00.79″N 10°37′01.46″E 189 m AMSL
- (iaa - Verona Torre 4) 45°27′11.35″N 11°00′30.55″E 164 m AMSL
- (IAY - Lame - Cavanella) ICEZ - Lame Concordia 45°44′55.99″N 12°52′08.75″E 7 m AMSL
- (iax - Aviano) IAVZ - Aviano 46°01′23.02″N 12°35′34.19″E 99 m AMSL
- (IB - Rome - Tolfa) ITLZ - Rome 42°09′01.76″N 11°54′32.73″E 621 m AMSL
- (iba - Rome Tail - Monte Cavo) IMCZ - Monte Cavo 41°45′04.86″N 12°42′31.03″E 930 m AMSL
- (IC - Naples - Ischia - Punta Fetto) IICZ - Naples 40°35′50.88″N 13°54′08.54″E 639 m AMSL
- (ica - Naples Tail - Monte Pecorara) IPEZ - Monte Petrino 41°13′24.29″N 13°57′57.75″E 335 m AMSL
- (icy - Monte Vergine) IMNZ - Monte Nardello 40°56′33.27″N 14°43′07.28″E 1516 m AMSL
- (icz - Monte Vulture) IVUZ - Monte Vulture 40°57′03.12″N 15°38′10.75″E 1301 m AMSL
- (icv - Monte Iacontenente) IIAZ - Monte Iacontenente 41°47′20.2956″N 16°2′58.0236″E
- (icf - Pietra Ficcata) IPFZ - Pietra Ficcata 40°34′04.90″N 16°19′21.31″E 586 m AMSL
- (icw - Martina Franca) IAMZ - Martina Franca 40°39′22.968″N 17°17′21.048″E
- (ID - Catanzaro - Monte Mancuso) IMMZ - Catanzaro 39°01′09.13″N 16°13′32.02″E 1319 m AMSL
- (IDA - Monte Lauro - Cozzo tre Grotte) ICCZ - Monte Lauro 37°06′52.13″N 14°51′18.96″E 944 m AMSL

AFSOUTH-Malta

- (idb - Malta - Gharghur) IDBZ - Malta - Gharghur

AFSOUTH-Greece

- (GA - Kefallina) > GKFZ - Kefallonia 38°10′11.18″N 20°37′08.53″E 1001 m AMSL
- (GB - Athens - Pendelikon) > GPKZ - Athens 38°04′50.46″N 23°52′58.14″E 1038 m AMSL
- (GBZ - Crete - Ziros) > GZIZ - Ziros 35°03′53.52″N 26°09′14.24″E 786 m AMSL
- (GBY - Larissa - Phillon) > GPIZ - Phillon 39°25′22.75″N 23°03′11.54″E 1513 m AMSL
- (GBW - Vitsi) > GVIZ - Vitzi 40°38′43.34″N 21°23′11.07″E 2009 m AMSL
- (GBV - Ismaros) > GISZ - Ismaros 40°53′34.67″N 25°32′56.06″E 612 m AMSL

AFSOUTH-Turkey

- (TA - Izmir - Bespinar Tepes) > TBPZ - Izmir - Bespinar Tepes 38°18′48.72″N 27°01′29.89″E 964 m AMSL
- (taa - Izmir Tail) > TKYZ - Izmir Tail
- (TB - Eskisehir) > TKUZ - Eskishir - Kutahya Dagi 39°25′03.25″N 29°51′19.07″E 1820 m AMSL
- (tba - Eskirsehir Tail) > TESZ - Eskirsehir Tail
- (TC - Ankara) > TEDZ - Ankara - Elan Dagi 39°48′20.59″N 32°59′32.27″E 1856 m AMSL
- (TCK - Merzifon) > TKJZ - Merzifon
- (TCW - Persembe) > TPEZ - Persembe
- (TCV - Pazar) > TPAZ - Pazar
- (TD - Kayseri - Pinarbasi) > TPIZ - Pinarbasi 38°40′38.09″N 36°24′10.59″E 2285 m AMSL
- (TG - Adana) > TDDZ - Davudi Dağı 36°49′39.37″N 35°38′18.66″E 515 m AMSL
- (tga - Adana Tail) > TDAZ - Adana Tail
- (TE - Dyarbakir - Karaka Dagi) > TDIZ - Dyarbakir - Karaka Dagi
- (tea - Dyarbakir Tail) > TDEZ - Dyarbakir Tail
- Bloatli, Turkey

AFSOUTH-Cyprus

- (TCZ - Cap Greco) > JCGZ -Cavo Greko 34°58′00.85″N 34°04′11.41″E 62 m AMSL

Equipment used

Initially, 60, 30 or 15 ft dish or planar antennas were used in combination with General Electric or RCA AN/MRC80 TRC24; AN/FRC-75 or 39 radio sets. Later replaced by newer Siemens & Halske EM 120/400 and 12/800 types. The type and beam angle of the antennas depended of the local site position and its distance to the next relay.

== See also ==
- Radio propagation
- Tropospheric scatter
- Microwave
- White Alice Communications System - Cold war era Alaskan tropospheric communications link
- List of White Alice Communications System sites
- List of DEW Line Sites
- Distant Early Warning Line
