= Radar tower =

Tower supporting a radar facility

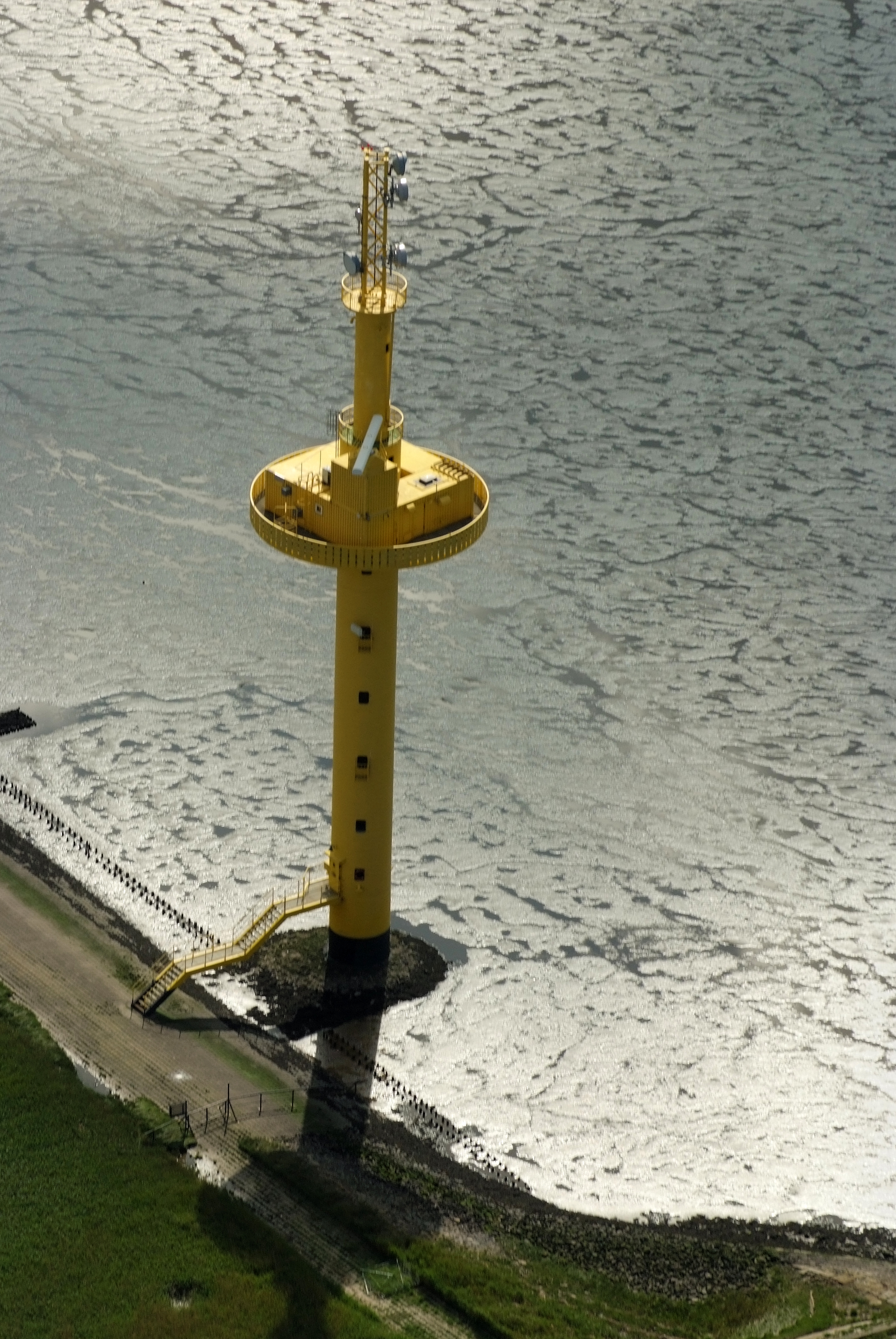
Radar tower on the North Sea artificial island of Langlütjen I in Germany (2012 aerial photograph)

A radar tower is a tower whose function is to support a radar facility, usually a local airport surveillance radar, and hence often at or in the vicinity of an airport or a military air base. The antenna is often continually rotating. In addition, radar towers are used for the installation and operation of search and height finder radars at military radar stations, where the mission is to support air defense missions. These missions were characterized as Aircraft Control & Warning (AC&W), or Long Range Surveillance in support of the Semi-Automatic Ground Environment (SAGE).

The tower typically has a continuously rotating parabolic antenna. Often, the antenna is protected from the weather by a radome, and is thus not visible from the outside.

For regional air traffic control, en route radar installations are used. The data from these radars is fed into the civilian RADNET system and transferred to all civil and military control centres.

Ideally, a radar tower is built on a high spot in the terrain, because this reduces the angle of elevation, and thus increases the range of the radar device. In the absence of a suitable high spot, radar towers are used. Radar towers are also need to provide weather protection and services (air conditioning and power) for the radar equipment, communications, operators and maintainers.

In Germany, the operational command posts of the German Air Force use the Bundeswehr radar towers for the stationary radar sites of the operational command areas. In Britain, radar gave them the edge during the Battle of Britain, allowing Britain to detect incoming air raids before they arrived.

Military radar stations have supported US and allied air defense operations at numerous worldwide locations since World War II. The largest network of military radar stations evolved during the Cold War era to support the air defense of North America as part of the joint US and Canadian command known as the North American Air Defense Command (NORAD). This military radar network became automated in 1960 with the operation of SAGE. SAGE provided the vital command, control, communications, and computers (C4S).

Long Range Radar (LRR) stations were electronically connected to SAGE Direction Centers (DCs). This resulted in an integrated air defense system made up of radar, radio, interceptor aircraft, antiaircraft guns and missiles, and command and control (C2) facilities. Most of the radar and radio facilities were not on a military air base, but smaller Air Force Stations (AFS), are usually located in rural, and sometimes isolated locations that are often miles away from even small towns. They were staffed by up to several hundred Air Force personnel.

This includes the AN/FPS-24 search radar tower that sits in a huge 64 foot square, 85 foot tall, six-story building. On top of this radar tower was a radar antenna 50 feet tall, 120 feet wide, weighing 85.5 tons, and rotating at 5 rpm. An available rigid radome 140 feet in diameter and 96 feet high protected this antenna from adverse weather conditions.

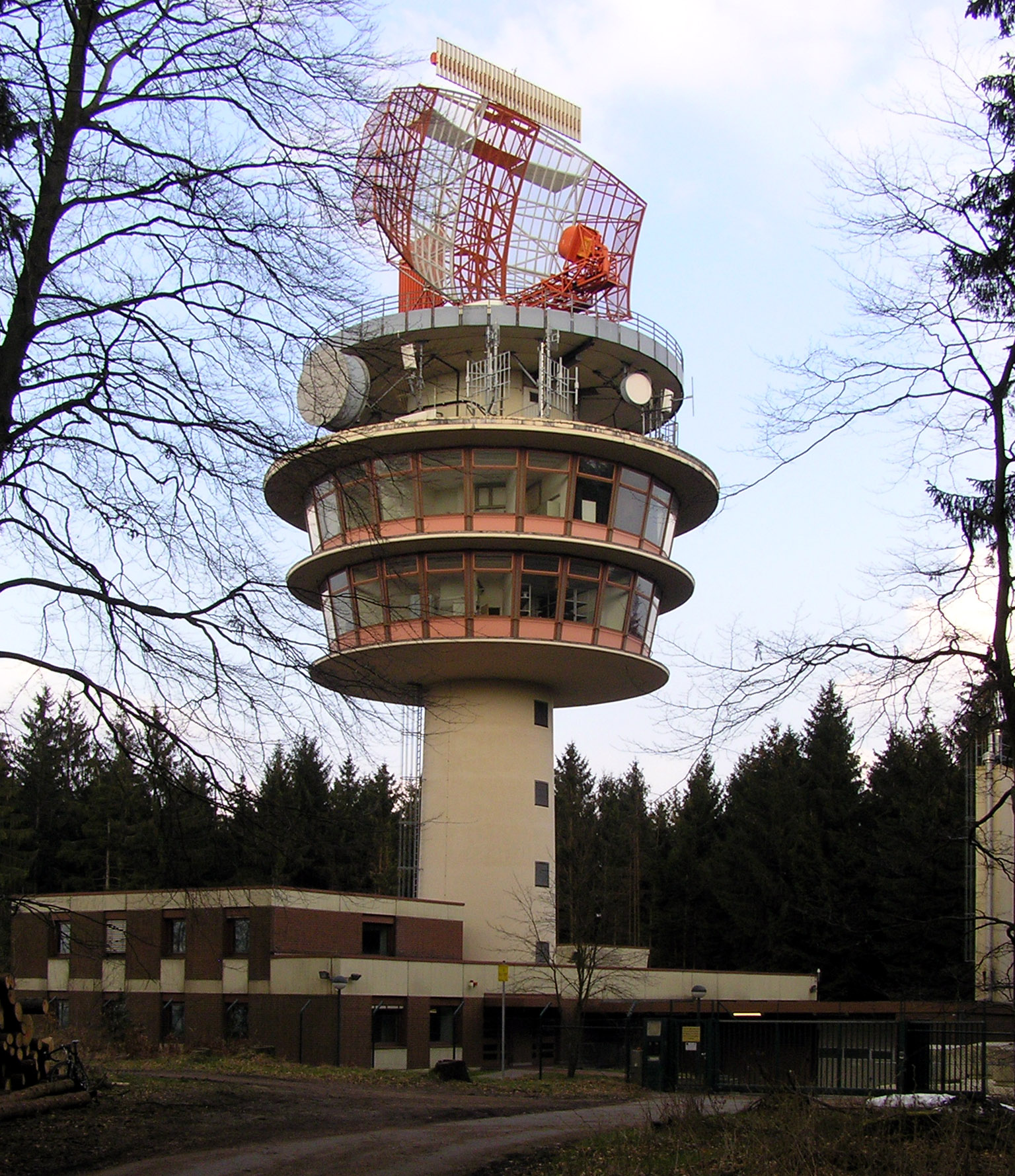
Tower with en route radar at Neunkircher Höhe in the Odenwald

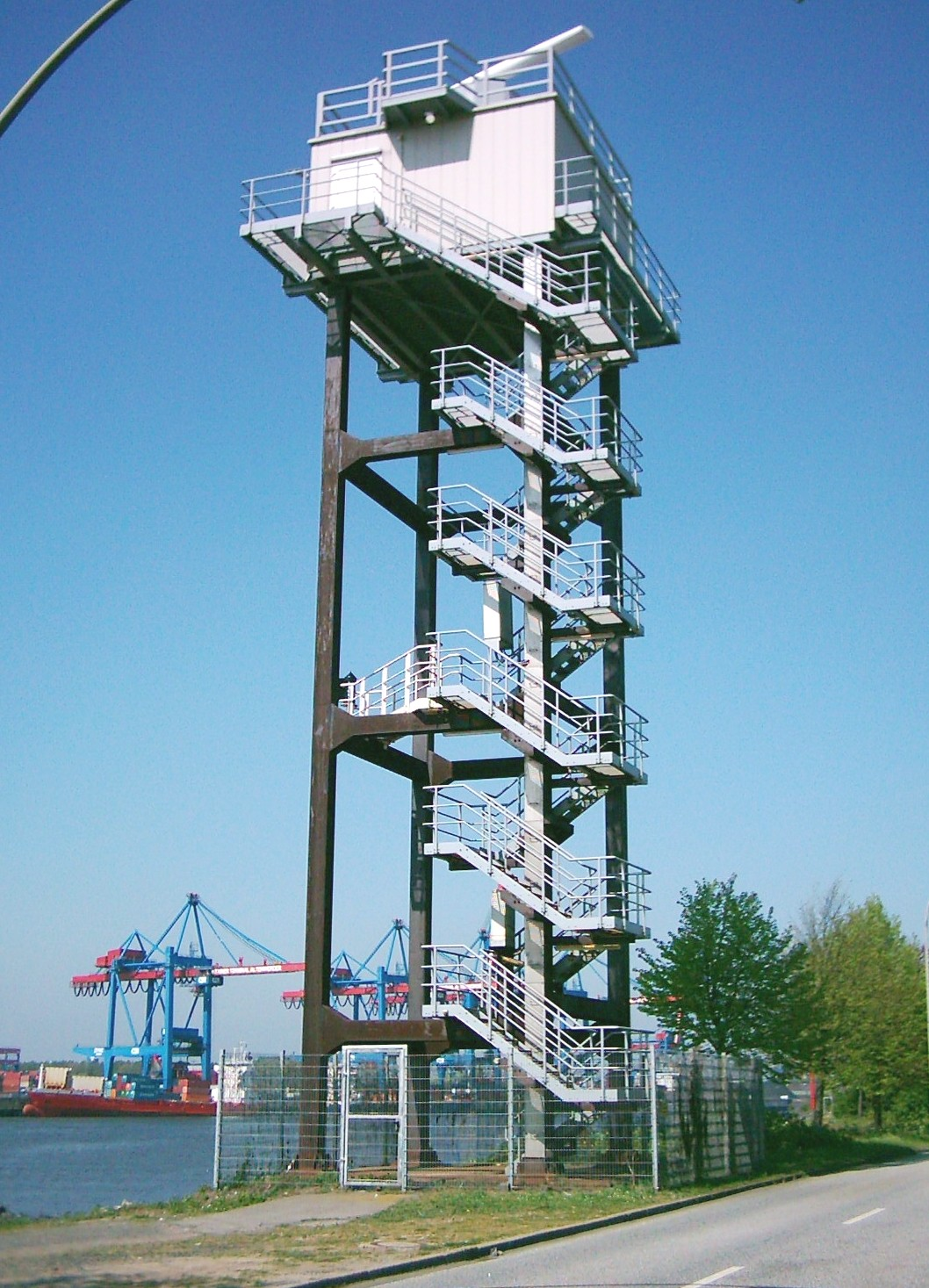
Radar tower for monitoring shipping on the South Elbe river opposite the Altenwerder Container Terminal, Hamburg

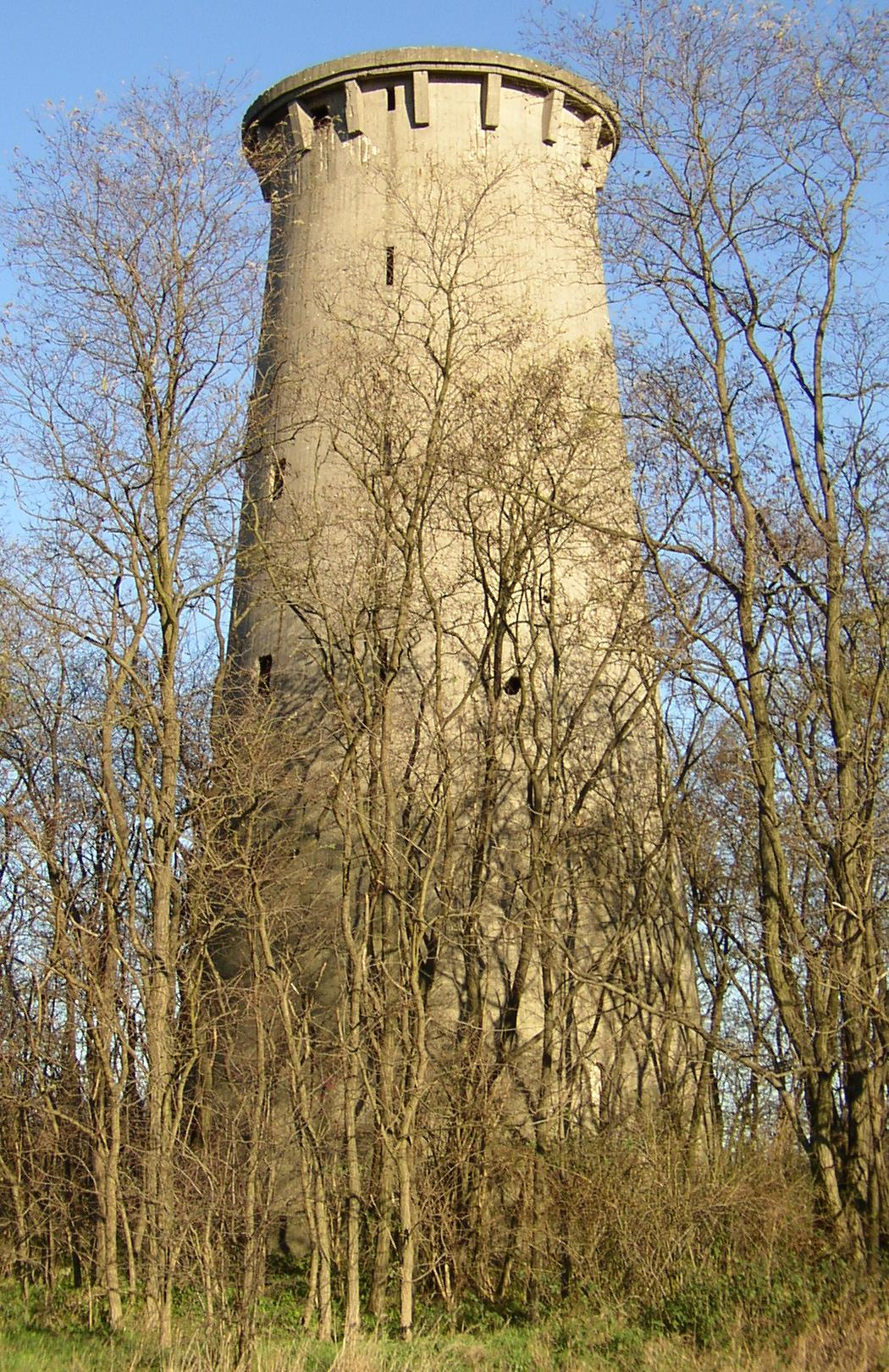
The Former Weesow radar tower in Werneuchen

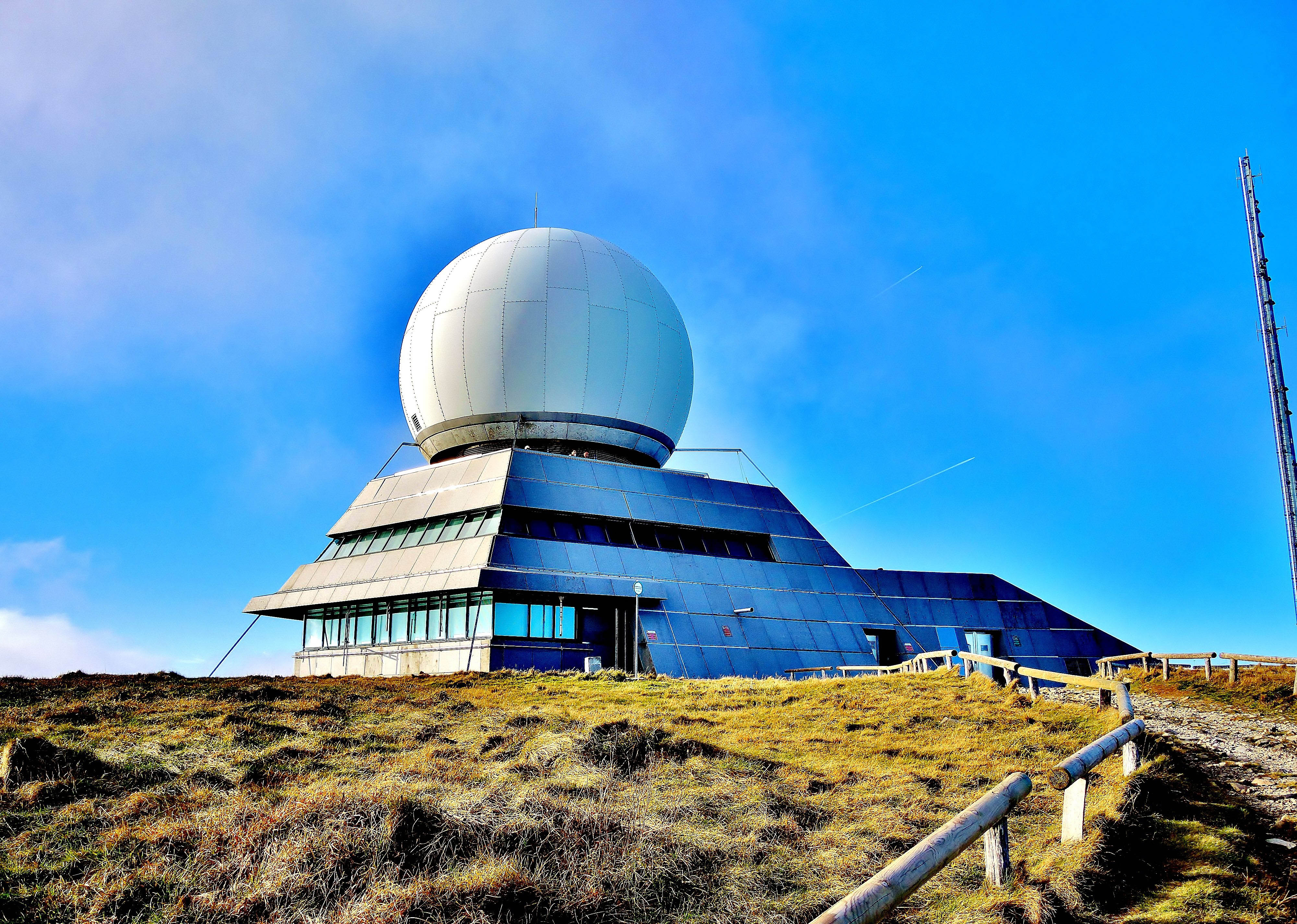
Radar station on a mountain in France
