= No. 40 Group RAF =

Former Royal Air Force operations group

No. 40 (Maintenance) Group RAF
- Royal Air Force Ensign
- Active: 1 January 1939 – 28 July 1961
- Country: United Kingdom
- Branch: Royal Air Force
- Type: Royal Air Force group
- Part of: RAF Maintenance Command

No. 40 Group RAF is a former Royal Air Force Maintenance group that was operational from 1 January 1939, throughout the Second World War and into the Cold War until 28 July 1961 within RAF Maintenance Command that dealt with equipment, barracks stores and motor transport storage.

No. 40 Group Communication Flight was operational until 1 May 1944 with duties taken over by the Maintenance Command Communication Squadron RAF.

== Structure ==
November 1939 – HQ at Abingdon

- 1, 3, 4, 7, 14, 16, 25, 35, A, B, C, D, E, F, G, H, L & K

May 1941 – HQ at Andover

- 5, 6, 8, 9, 10, 12, 15, 18, 19, 20, 22, 23, 24, 27, 29, 33, 37, 38, 39, 44, 45, 46, 47, 48, 51 & No. 52 Maintenance Unit RAF
- RAF Hamble = No. 15 Ferry Pilots Pool ATA
- Hatfield Aerodrome = No. 5 Ferry Pilots Pool ATA
- RAF Hawarden = No. 3 Ferry Pilots Pool ATA
- RAF Hullavington = No. 8 (Service) Ferry Pilots Pool RAF
- RAF Prestwick = No. 4 Ferry Pilots Pool ATA
- RAF Ratcliffe = No. 6 Ferry Pilots Pool ATA
- RAF Ringway = No. 14 Ferry Pilots Pool ATA
- Bristol (Whitchurch) Airport = No. 2 Ferry Pilots Pool ATA
- RAF White Waltham = No. 1 Ferry Pilots Pool ATA

April 1942 – HQ at Andover

- 3, 7, 14, 16, 17, 25, 35, 55, 61, 62, 66, 69, 70, 72, 74, 79, 82, 201, 204, 99, 203, 217, A, B, E, F, L, R & S Maintenance Unit RAF

April 1943 – HQ at Andover

- 3, 5, 7, 14, 16, 17, 25, 35, 55, 61, 62, 66, 68, 69, 70, 72, 73, 74, 79, 87, 89, 99, 201, 203, 204, 205, 207, 208, 210, 211, 216, 228, 229, 232, 236, A, E, H & T Maintenance Unit RAF

July 1944 – HQ at Andover

- 3, 7, 14, 16, 17, 25, 35, 61, 62, 66, 68, 69, 70, 72, 73, 74, 79, 87, 89, 99, 203, 204, 205, 207, 208, 209, 210, 211, 212, 214, 216, 217, 220, 221, 225, 227, 230, 232, 236, 238, 239, 240 & No. 241 Maintenance Unit RAF

July 1945 – HQ at Andover

- No. 56 Wing RAF – HQ at Annan:
  - 3, 7, 14, 17, 35, 62, 68, 69, 70, 73, 74, 79, 87, 205, 208, 209, 210, 211, 212, 214, 217, 220, 225, 230, 232, 238, 239, 246 & No. 261 Maintenance Unit RAF
- No. 55 (Midland) Wing RAF – HQ at Eggington:
  - 16, 25, 61, 66, 72, 89, 99, 203, 204, 207, 216, 221, 227, 236 & No. 241 Maintenance Unit RAF

April 1953 – HQ at Bicester

- 3, 5, 7, 8, 9, 10, 12, 14, 15, 16, 19, 20, 22, 23, 25, 27, 29, 33, 35, 38, 39, 44, 45, 47, 48, 51, 61, 66, 72, 90, 99, 216, 225, 236, 237 & No. 248 Maintenance Unit RAF
- RAF Defford = Telecommunications Flying Unit RAF
- RAF Felixstowe = Marine Aircraft Experimental Establishment
- RAF Gosport = Aircraft Torpedo Development Unit
- RAF Henlow = Parachute Test Unit
- RAF Martlesham Heath = Armament and Instrument Experimental Unit RAF
- RAF West Freugh = Bombing Trials Unit RAF

== No. 42 (Maintenance) Group RAF ==
No. 42 (Maintenance) Group RAF was formed on 1 January 1939 as an ammunition and fuel group. It headquarters was located at "Highwoods," Burghfield Common, near Reading, from September 1939 to 1945. It moved to Kidlington on 18 March 1946. It was disbanded into No. 40 Group RAF on 2 January 1956 while its headquarters was at RAF Kidlington.

November 1939 - HQ at Burghfield Common, Reading

- 2, 11, 21, 28, 91, 92, 93, 94 & No. 95 Maintenance Unit RAF

May 1941 - HQ at Burghfield Common, Reading

- 2, 11, 21, 28, 36, 53, 91, 92, 93, 94, 95 & No. 98 Maintenance Unit RAF

April 1942 - Burghfield Common, Reading

- 2, 11, 21, 31, 28, 36, 53, 59, 64, 81, 91, 92, 94, 93, 95, 96, 98 & No. 100 Maintenance Unit RAF

April 1943 - HQ at Burghfield Common, Reading

- 2, 11, 21, 28, 31, 36, 53, 59, 64, 77, 80, 81, 91, 92, 93, 94, 95, 96, 98, 100, 202, 219 & No. 224 Maintenance Unit RAF

July 1944 - HQ at Burghfield Common, Reading

- 2, 11, 21, 28, 31, 36, 53, 59, 64, 77, 80, 81, 91, 92, 93, 94, 95, 96, 98, 100, 202, 219, 231, 233, 224, 243 & No. 244 Maintenance Unit RAF

July 1945 - HQ at Burghfield Common, Reading

- 2, 11, 21, 28, 31, 36, 53, 59, 64, 77, 80, 81, 91, 92, 93, 94, 95, 96, 98, 100, 202, 219, 224, 231, 233, 243, 244, 245 & No. 249 Maintenance Unit RAF

April 1953 - HQ at RAF Kidlington

- 2, 11, 21, 28, 31, 53, 91, 92, 93, 94, 95, 202, 243, 244, 277, 279, 280, 281 & No. 282 Maintenance Unit RAF
