= No. 64 Group RAF =

No. 64 Group RAF No. 64 (Northern Reserve) Group RAF No. 64 (Northern) Group RAF
- Active: 23 July 1946 – 31 March 1959
- Country: United Kingdom
- Branch: Royal Air Force
- Type: Group
- Part of: RAF Home Command
- Garrison/HQ: RAF Rufforth

No. 64 Group RAF is a former Royal Air Force group which was operational between July 1946 and March 1959.

64 Group had three other groups disband into it, these were: No. 66 Group RAF on 1 February 1957 and No. 67 Group RAF on 28 February 1957.

== History of No. 64 Group RAF ==
No. 64 (Northern Reserve) Group RAF was formed on 23 July 1946 within Sheffield, it moved to within York on 1 May 1947 and was renamed to No. 64 (Northern) Group RAF on 1 August 1950. The group moved to RAF Rufforth on 15 January 1953 and was disbanded on 31 March 1959.

During April 1953 the group controlled:

- RAF Rufforth
  - No. 64 Group Communication Flight
  - No. 1964 Reserve Air Observation Post Flight RAF - Auster
- RAF Burnaston (Derby)
  - No. 16 Reserve Flying School RAF – Prentice & Anson
  - No. 3 Basic Flying Training School RAF – Chipmunk
- RAF Desford
  - No. 7 Reserve Flying School RAF – Anson & Tiger Moth
  - No. 1969 Reserve Air Observation Post Flight RAF – Auster
- RAF Doncaster
  - No. 9 Reserve Flying School RAF – Anson & Tiger Moth
- RAF Hucknall
  - No. 1970 Reserve Air Observation Post Flight RAF – Auster
- Brough Aerodrome (Hull)
  - Hull University Air Squadron – Chipmunk
- RAF Newton
  - Nottingham University Air Squadron – Chipmunk
- RAF Ouston
  - No. 1965 Reserve Air Observation Post Flight RAF – Auster
- RAF Sherburn-in-Elmet
  - Leeds University Air Squadron – Chipmunk
- RAF Sywell
  - No. 4 Basic Flying Training School RAF – Chipmunk
- RAF Usworth
  - No. 23 Reserve Flying School RAF – Chipmunk & Anson
  - Durham University Air Squadron – Chipmunk

== History of No. 63 Group RAF ==
No. 63 (Western & Welsh Reserve) Group RAF was formed on 2 May 1946 within Wilmslow, on 23 July 1946 it moved to RAF Hawarden and was renamed to No. 63 (Western & Welsh) Group RAF on 1 August 1950. It was disbanded on 1 January 1957 into No. 64 Group.

During April 1953 the group controlled:

- RAF Hawarden
  - No. 63 Group Communication Flight
- Cardiff Airport
  - No. 3 Reserve Flying School RAF – Chipmunk & Anson
  - No. 1952 Reserve Air Observation Post Flight RAF – Auster
- RAF Castle Bromwich
  - No. 5 Reserve Flying School RAF – Chipmunk & Anson
  - University of Birmingham Air Squadron – Chipmunk
- RAF Hooton Park
  - No. 663 Squadron RAF – Auster
  - No. 1953 Reserve Air Observation Post Flight RAF – Auster
  - No. 1955 Reserve Air Observation Post Flight RAF – Auster
- RAF Llanbedr
  - No. 5 Civilian Anti-Aircraft Co-operation Unit RAF – Vampire, Beaufighter & Spitfire
- RAF Llandow
  - No. 4 Civilian Anti-Aircraft Co-operation Unit RAF
- RAF Ringway
  - No. 1951 Reserve Air Observation Post Flight RAF – Auster
- Wolverhampton (Pendeford) Airport
  - No. 1954 Reserve Air Observation Post Flight RAF – Auster
- RAF Woodvale
  - No. 19 Reserve Flying School RAF – Chipmunk & Anson
  - Liverpool University Air Squadron – Chipmunk
  - Manchester University Air Squadron – Chipmunk

== History of No. 66 Group RAF ==
No. 66 (Scottish Reserve) Group RAF was formed on 28 May 1946 within Edinburgh, it moved to RAF Turnhouse on 9 August 1946 and was renamed to No. 66 (Scottish) Group on 1 August 1950. It moved to HMS Lochinvar, Port Edgar on 22 November 1954 and was disbanded on 1 February 1957 into No. 64 Group.

During April 1953 the group controlled:

- RAF Abbotsinch
  - No. 1967 Air Observation Post Flight RAF – Auster
- RAF Dyce
  - Aberdeen University Air Squadron – Chipmunk
- RAF Leuchars
  - St Andrews University Air Squadron – Chipmunk
- Perth Airport
  - No. 11 Reserve Flying School RAF – Anson & Chipmunk
  - Glasgow University Air Squadron – Chipmunk
  - No. 1966 Air Observation Post Flight RAF – Auster
- RAF Turnhouse
  - Edinburgh University Air Squadron – Chipmunk
  - No. 1968 Air Observation Post Flight RAF – Auster

== History of No. 67 Group RAF ==
No. 67 (Northern Ireland Reserve) Group was reformed on 1 April 1950 at RAF Aldergrove, it moved to within Belfast on 16 June 1950. It was renamed to No. 67 (Northern Ireland) Group RAF on 1 August 1950 and disbanded on 28 February 1957 into No. 64 Group.

During April 1953 the group controlled:

- RAF Aldergrove
  - No. 67 Group Communication Flight
- RAF Sydenham
  - Queens University Air Squadron – Chipmunk

== See also ==
- List of Royal Air Force groups
