= List of Royal Air Force groups =

Ensign of the Royal Air Force, this will be hoisted at all RAF group headquarters.

This list of Royal Air Force groups is an overview of all groups, current and former, of the Royal Air Force (RAF). An air force group is a high-level controlling organisational formation, subordinate only to command level. Individual groups within the Royal Air Force have overall command and responsibility for major operational tasks of the RAF; for example: combat, combat support, training and administration.

As of 2024, there are only five active groups. Four are in the United Kingdom while the fifth, a more skeleton organisation, is in the Middle East. No. 1 Group (1 Gp), No. 2 Group (2 Gp), No. 11 Group (11 Gp), No. 22 Group (22 Gp) are in the UK. All four groups are now effectively subdivisions and staff branches of the larger Air Command headquarters, as all are at High Wycombe. No. 83 Expeditionary Air Group (83 EAG), the renamed UK Air Component Headquarters in the Middle East, has its headquarters at Al Udeid in Qatar.

== List ==
=== Current ===
RAF group	Dates active	Description
No. 1 Group RAF	1918–1926; 1927–1939; 1940–present	Originally formed on 1 April 1918 (same day as the Royal Air Force creation) in London, it was renumbered 21 Group on 12 April 1926. Reformed on 25 August 1927 by renaming the Air Defence Group, but disbanded on 22 December 1939. Reformed on 22 June 1940 within Bomber Command, post-war it operated the Thor ballistic missile. From 1968, it operated bomber and strike aircraft of Strike Command. It now administers most flying squadrons.
No. 2 Group RAF	1918–1920; 1936–1947; 1948–1958; 1993–1996; 2000–present	Formed as No. 2 (Training) Group on 1 April 1918, it disbanded on 31 March 1920. Reformed as No. 2 (Bombing) Group within Bomber Command on 20 March 1936. In May 1943, it was transferred to the Second Tactical Air Force (2TAF) within Fighter Command, until the formation of the Allied Expeditionary Air Force. Disbanded on 1 May 1947, but reformed on 1 December 1948 as part of the British Air Forces of Occupation (BAFO). It rejoined 2TAF on 1 September 1951, and disbanded on 15 November 1958. Reformed on 1 April 1993 by renaming Royal Air Force Germany (RAFG), then disbanded on 1 April 1996 when absorbed into 1 Group. Reformed on 7 January 2000 to control air transport, air-to-air refuelling, and airborne early warning within the RAF. On 1 April 2006, it absorbed 3 Group.
No. 11 Group RAF	1918–1920; 1936–1960; 1961–1963; 1968–1996; 2018–present	Formed on 1 April 1918 as No. 11 (Equipment) Group, and disbanded on 17 May 1918. It reformed on 22 August 1918, but reduced to 11 Wing in May 1920. Reformed on 1 May 1936 as No. 11 (Fighter) Group by renaming Fighting Area, and transferred to Fighter Command on 14 July 1936. Disbanded on 31 December 1960, but reformed on 1 January 1961 by renaming 13 Group. Renamed No. 11 (Northern) Sector on 1 April 1963. Reformed on 1 April 1968 within Strike Command to take over the role of Fighter Command. Renamed No. 11 (Air Defence) Group in January 1986. Amalgamated with 18 Group on 1 April 1996. Reformed in 2018 to leads the RAF's response to new and evolving threats in the air, cyber and space domains, the group now runs day-to-day RAF operations.
No. 22 Group RAF	1918–1919; 1926–1940; 1943–1972; 2006–present	Formed on 1 April 1918 as No. 22 (Operations) Group, in Scotland, and disbanded on 30 May 1919. Reformed on 12 April 1926 from 7 Group as No. 22 (Army Co-operation) Group, and on 1 December 1940, expanded to become Army Cooperation Command. Reformed on 1 August 1943 as No. 22 (Training) Group, Technical Training Command, until disbanded on 31 January 1972. Reformed on 30 October 2006 as No. 22 (Training) Group.
No. 83 Expeditionary Air Group RAF	1943–1946; 1952–1958; 2006–present	Formed on 1 April 1943 as No. 83 (Composite) Group, Second Tactical Air Force (2TAF), and was absorbed into 84 Group on 21 April 1946 . Reformed on 9 July 1952 as No. 83 Group, part of the British Air Forces of Occupation in Germany, until disbanded on 16 June 1958. Reformed as No. 83 Expeditionary Air Group on 1 April 2006 in the Middle East to support operations in the region.

=== Former (inactive) ===
RAF group	Dates active	Description
No. 3 Group RAF	1918–1921; 1923–1926; 1936–1967; 2000–2006	No. 3 Group was first formed on 10 May 1918, and disbanded on 31 August 1921. It reformed from 11 Wing on 1 April 1923, and disbanded when renumbered as No. 23 (Training) Group on 12 April 1926. Reformed on 1 May 1936 as No. 3 (Bomber) Group within Bomber Command. From 1959 to 1963, it operated the Thor ballistic missile, then V bomber squadrons until disbanded in 1967. It reformed on 1 April 2000 to control the Joint Force Harrier (JFH) and maritime resources. By 2004, it was also responsible for Air Battle Management, but disbanded on 1 April 2006, and its functions taken over by 2 Group.
No. 4 Group RAF	1918–1919; 1937–1948	Originally formed on 1 April 1918, but disbanded on 24 March 1919. It reformed on 1 April 1937 as No. 4 (Bomber) Group within Bomber Command. Transferred to Transport Command on 7 May 1945, and disbanded on 2 February 1948.
No. 5 Group RAF	1918–1919; 1937–1945	Formed on 1 April 1918, but disbanded on 15 May 1919. Reformed on 1 September 1937 as No. 5 (Bomber) Group within Bomber Command. Disbanded on 15 December 1945.
No. 6 Group RAF	1918; 1924–1926; 1936–1939; 1942–1945	No. 6 (Equipment) Group was formed on 1 April 1918, but was renamed Technical Group on 15 August 1918. It reformed in Italy as No. 6 (Adriatic) Group on 27 September 1918, but reduced to 66 Wing on 20 December 1918. Reformed as No. 6 (Fighter) Group on 1 May 1924, and disbanded 20 May 1926. Reformed as No. 6 (Auxiliary) Group on 1 May 1936 by renaming No. 1 (Air Defence Group). Transferred to Bomber Command on 14 July 1936, and renamed No. 6 (Bomber) Group on 1 January 1939, but became 91 Group on 11 May 1942. Reformed as part of the Royal Canadian Air Force on 25 October 1942, and disbanded on 31 August 1945.
No. 7 Group RAF	1918–1919; 1919–1926; 1940–1942; 1944–1945	Formed on 1 April 1918 from Southern Training Brigade, renamed No. 7 (Training) Group on 8 August, and disbanded on 16 August 1919. Reformed by reducing South-Western Area to group status on 20 September 1919, and disbanded on 12 April 1926. Reformed on 15 July 1940 as No. 7 (Operational Training) Group within Bomber Command. Renamed 92 Group on 11 May 1942. Reformed on 1 November 1944 to control Heavy conversion units until disbanded on 21 December 1945.
No. 8 Group RAF	1918–1919; 1941–1942; 1943–1945	Formed in April 1918, renamed No. 8 (Training) Group on 8 August, and disbanded on 15 May 1919. Reformed as No. 8 (Bomber) Group on 1 September 1941, but disbanded on 28 January 1942. The Pathfinder Force was renamed No. 8 (Pathfinder Force) Group on 13 January 1943, and disbanded on 15 December 1945.
No. 9 Group RAF	1918–1919; 1940–1944	Formed on 1 April 1918, renamed No. 9 (Operations) Group on 8 August, and disbanded on 15 May 1919. Reformed on 9 August 1940 as No. 9 (Fighter) Group within Fighter Command, to cover the north-west England and Northern Ireland. Absorbed into 12 Group on 15 September 1944.
No. 10 Group RAF	1918–1932; 1940–1945	Formed on 1 April 1918, renamed No. 10 (Operations) Group on 8 August, and disbanded on 18 January 1932. Reformed on 1 June 1940 as No. 10 (Fighter) Group to cover south-west England. Absorbed into 11 Group on 2 May 1945.
No. 12 Group RAF	1918–1919; 1937–1963	Formed in April 1918, renamed No. 12 (Training) Group on 8 August, becoming RAF (Cadet) College on 1 November 1919. Reformed on 1 April 1937 as No. 12 (Fighter) Group to cover the Midlands and North of England. Renamed No. 12 (Northern) Sector on 31 March 1963.
No. 13 Group RAF	1918–1961	Formed on 1 April 1918, renamed No. 13 (Training) Group on 8 August 1918, and merged into 3 Group on 18 October 1919. Reformed on 15 March 1939 as No. 13 (Fighter) Group to cover the North of England and Scotland, and disbanded on 20 May 1946. Reformed on 16 May 1955, and disbanded on 31 December 1961 by being renamed 11 Group.
No. 14 Group RAF	1918–1919; 1940–1943	Formed on 1 April 1918 by renaming the Milford Haven Anti-Submarine Group, renamed No. 14 (Operations) Group on 8 August, and disbanded on 19 May 1919. Reformed on 20 January 1940 as No. 14 (Fighter) Group by renaming 60 Wing in France, and disbanded on 22 June 1940. Reformed in June 1940 to cover Scotland, and disbanded on 15 July 1943.
No. 15 Group RAF	1918–1919; 1939–1945	No. 15 (Equipment) Group was formed on 1 April 1918, and disbanded by 27 September 1918, when it reformed as No. 15 (Aegean) Group to control 62 and 63 Wings, until disbanded on 1 September 1919. Reformed on 15 March 1939 as No. 15 (General Reconnaissance) Group within Coastal Command. Disbanded on 1 August 1945.
No. 16 Group RAF	1918–1920; 1936–1946	Formed on 1 April 1918 by renaming Northern Training Brigade, renamed No. 16 (Training) Group on 8 August, and disbanded on 7 February 1920. Reformed on 1 December 1936 as No. 16 (Reconnaissance) Group within Coastal Command. Disbanded by being reduced to 16 Wing on 8 March 1946.
No. 17 Group RAF	1918–1919; 1936–1945	Formed in No. 4 Area in April 1918, and transferred to North-Eastern Area on 8 May 1918. (Training) added on 8 August 1918. Disbanded 18 October 1919. Reformed 1 December 1936 as No. 17 (Training) Group within Coastal Command. Order of battle on 6 June 1944 included No.s 4, 5, 6, 7, 9, 131, and 132 OTUs, and No. 1674 Heavy Conversion Unit. Disbanded 1 September 1945.
No. 18 Group RAF	1918–1919; 1938–1996	First formed on 1 April 1918, it disbanded 18 October 1919. It reformed on 1 September 1938 as No. 18 (Reconnaissance) Group within Coastal Command. It disbanded when merged with 11 Group on 1 April 1996 to form 11/18 Group.
No. 11/18 Group RAF	1996–2000	Formed in 1996 as part of Strike Command, combining No. 11 and 18 Groups. In 2000, its assets were transferred to 1 Group and 3 Group.
No. 19 Group RAF	1918; 1941–1969	Formed in April 1918 as No. 19 (Equipment) Group in York, but disbanded in June. Reformed in early 1941 as No. 19 (General Reconnaissance) Group within Coastal Command, at Mount Wise, Plymouth, relocating to RAF Mount Batten in 1947. Became HQ Southern Maritime Air Region in November 1969.
No. 20 Group RAF	1918–1919; 1939–1943	Originally formed on 1 April 1918, but disbanded in September 1919. Reformed in November 1939 as No. 20 (Training) Group within Training Command. Transferred to Technical Training Command in May 1940. Absorbed into 22 (Training) Group, August 1943.
No. 21 Group RAF	1918; 1926–1934; 1938–1955	Formed on 1 April 1918 at RAF Montrose within No. 5 Area, but disbanded on being absorbed into 20 Group on 1 July 1918. It reformed as No 21 (Training) Group, on 12 April 1926, when 1 Group was renamed. Part of Inland Area, it disbanded on 1 February 1934. Reformed as No 21 (Training) Group within Training Command and based at RAF Cranwell. It was transferred to Flying Training Command on 27 May 1940, and was responsible for the RAF College and the Service Flying Training Schools from the Midlands northwards. In 1947 and 1953, absorbed 91 Group and 54 Group, before finally disbanding in 1955.
No. 23 Group RAF	1918; 1926–1975	Formed on 1 April 1918 as No. 23 (Equipment) Group, but disbanded in May. Reformed as No. 23 (Training) Group on 12 April 1926 by renumbering 3 Group. Transferred to Training Command on 1 May 1936, and to Flying Training Command on 27 May 1940. Disbanded on 2 May 1975.
No. 24 Group RAF	1918–1919; 1936–1975	Formed on 26 June 1918 from No. 46 and 48 Wings. Disbanded 13 June 1919. Reformed on 10 July 1936 as No. 24 (Training) Group within Training Command, and transferred to Technical Training Command on 27 May 1940, becoming No. 24 (Technical Training) Group. Disbanded on 29 December 1975.
No. 25 Group RAF	1918–1920; 1937–1948	Formed on 12 August 1918 as No. 25 (Operations) Group, but disbanded in 1920. Reformed on 1 February 1937, when the Armament Group was renamed No. 25 (Armament) Group within Training Command. Transferred to Flying Training Command on 27 May 1940, and disbanded on 15 April 1948.
No. 26 Group RAF	1918–1919; 1937–1939; 1940–1946	Formed in Egypt as No. 26 (Training) Group in November 1918, but disbanded in 1919. Reformed on 1 December 1937 by renaming the Superintendent of the Reserve and Inspector of Civil Flying Training Schools within Training Command to control Elementary and Reserve Flying Training Schools. Renamed No. 50 (Reserve) Group and transferred to Reserve Command, 3 February 1939. Reformed on 12 February 1940 as No. 26 (Signals) Group within Training Command, and transferred to Technical Training Command on 27 May 1940. Transferred to Bomber Command on 10 February 1942; supervised 105 Wing, responsible for combined operations training; group amalgamated with No. 60 (Signals) Group to form No. 90 (Signals) Group on 25 April 1946.
No. 27 Group RAF	1918–1919; 1941–1958	Originally formed on 29 August 1918 at RAF Bircham Newton as part of the Independent Air Force, and disbanded on 19 May 1919. Reformed on 26 May 1941 as No. 27 (Signals Training) Group within Technical Training Command. Disbanded on 1 October 1958.
No. 28 Group RAF	1918–1919; 1942–1950	Formed as No. 28 (Orkney & Shetland Islands) Group under the Commander-in-Chief of the Grand Fleet on 13 July 1918, and disbanded on 15 April 1919. Reformed as No. 28 (Technical Training) Group within Technical Training Command, on 1 November 1942. Disbanded on 6 March 1950.
No. 29 Group RAF	1918–1922; 1942–1945	Briefly formed as No 29 (Training) Group in Egypt in early November 1918. Reformed on 27 November 1918 as No. 29 (Operations) Group under Commander-in-Chief of the Grand Fleet. Renamed No. 29 (Fleet) Group in August 1919. Transferred to Coastal Area on 15 September 1919, and disbanded on 31 March 1922. Reformed on 1 July 1942 as No. 29 (Flying Training) Group, Flying Training Command, splitting from 25 Group. Re-absorbed into 25 Group in July 1945.
No. 30 Group RAF	1918–1919; 1937–1945	Formed at Salonika in August 1918 as No. 30 (Operational) Group, but reduced and renamed 16 Wing on 7 April 1919. Reformed on 17 March 1937 as No. 30 (Balloon Barrage) Group within Fighter Command. Transferred to Balloon Command on 1 November 1938, and disbanded on 7 January 1945. Headquartered at Chessington, near Surbiton, Surrey, whilst in Balloon Command.
No. 31 Group RAF	1918–1919; 1939–1941	Formed in Mesopotamia in August 1918 as No. 31 (Operational) Group, and disbanded in April 1919. Reformed on 1 April 1939 as No. 31 (Balloon Barrage) Group within Balloon Command. Disbanded on 13 November 1941.
No. 32 Group RAF	1939–1944	Formed on 1 March 1939 as No. 32 (Balloon Barrage) Group within Balloon Command. Disbanded on 15 November 1944. Headquartered at Claverton Manor, Claverton, near Bath, Somerset.
No. 33 Group RAF	1939–1944	Formed as No. 33 (Balloon Barrage) Group within Balloon Command, on 1 March 1939. Disbanded on 4 September 1944. Headquartered at Parkhead House, Abbey Lane, Sheffield, Yorkshire.
No. 34 Group RAF	1939–1944	Formed as No. 34 (Balloon Barrage) Group within Balloon Command, on 7 April 1940. Disbanded on 19 July 1943. Headquartered at Tor House, Corstorphine Road, Edinburgh.
No. 38 Group RAF	1943–1951; 1960–1983; 1992–2000; 2014–2020	Formed on 11 October 1943 as No. 38 (Airborne Force) Group within Fighter Command. On 1 June 1945, became part of Transport Command, and disbanded on 1 February 1951. Reformed on 1 January 1960 as No. 38 (Air Support) Group within Transport Command. It was transferred to Strike Command on 1 July 1972, and disbanded on 17 November 1983. Reformed 1 November 1992 as part of Strike Command, and disbanded on 1 April 2000. No. 38 Group reformed on 2 July 2014, bringing together the RAF's Engineering, Logistics, Communications, and Medical Operations units. It was headquartered at RAF High Wycombe in Buckinghamshire. It disbanded on 31 December 2020.
No. 40 Group RAF	1939–1961	Formed on 3 January 1939 as No. 40 (Maintenance) Group within Maintenance Command. Responsible for all equipment except bombs and explosives. Disbanded on 28 July 1961.
No. 41 Group RAF	1939–1961	Formed on 1 January 1939 as No. 41 (Maintenance) Group within Maintenance Command. Responsible for supply and allocation of aircraft. Disbanded on 21 July 1961.
No. 42 Group RAF	1939–1956	Formed on 1 January 1939 as No. 42 (Maintenance) Group within Maintenance Command. On 17 April 1939, the group assumed responsibility for all ammunition and fuel depots. Disbanded on 2 January 1956.
No. 43 Group RAF	1939–1956	Formed on 1 January 1939 as No. 43 (Maintenance) Group within Maintenance Command. On 21 September 1939, it assumed responsibility for the salvage of aircraft and equipment. Disbanded on 2 January 1956.
No. 44 Group RAF	1941–1946	No. 44 (Ferry Service) Group was formed on 15 August 1941 from the Overseas Air Movements Control Unit of Ferry Command. Transferred to Transport Command on 25 March 1943, and disbanded on 14 August 1946.
No. 45 Group RAF	1943–1946	No. 45 (Atlantic Ferry) Group was formed 1 April 1943 from Ferry Command, when it was reduced to a group within Transport Command. It was renamed No. 45 (Transport) Group in June 1944, and transferred to Coastal Command on 1 January 1946. Reduced to 45 Wing on 15 February 1946.
No. 46 Group RAF	1944–1950; 1972–1976	Formed on 17 January 1944 as No. 46 (Transport) Group, but disbanded on 15 October 1949. It reformed on 1 November 1949 when No. 47 (Transport) Group was renamed, and disbanded on 31 March 1950. It reformed on 1 September 1972 as No. 46 (Strategic Support) Group within Strike Command, to take over the transport role of Air Support Command. It merged with 38 Group on 1 January 1976.
No. 47 Group RAF	1945–1949	No. 47 (Transport) Group was formed on 1 January 1945 from 116 Wing. In June 1946, it controlled RAF Bourn (no units); RAF Holmsley South (246 Sqn); RAF Lyneham (511 Sqn, 2 GCA Unit); RAF Merryfield (no units); RAF Oakington (242 Sqn); RAF Stradishall (51 Sqn); RAF Waterbeach (59 Sqn, (220 Sqn); RAF Upwood (53 Sqn); and RAF Little Staughton (47 Comm Flt). It was renamed 46 Group on 1 November 1949.
No. 48 Group RAF	1945–1946	No. 48 (Transport) Group was formed on 29 October 1945, and disbanded on 15 May 1946.
No. 50 Group RAF	1939–1947	No. 50 (Training) Group was formed on 1 February 1939 by renaming No. 26 (Training) Group and transferring it to Reserve Command. It was transferred to Flying Training Command on 27 May 1940, and disbanded 31 May 1947.
No. 51 Group RAF	1939–1945	No. 51 (Training) Group was formed on 11 May 1939 as part of Reserve Command. It was transferred to Flying Training Command on 27 May 1940, and disbanded 14 July 1945.
No. 52 Group RAF		No. 52 (Training) Group was due to form in March 1939 in Reserve Command, but not activated.
No. 53 Group RAF		No. 53 (Training) Group was due to form in March 1939 in Reserve Command, but not activated.
No. 54 Group RAF	1939–1946; 1951–1953	No. 54 (Training) Group was formed 30 August 1939 in Reserve Command to control Initial Training Wings. It was transferred to Flying Training Command on 27 May 1940, and disbanded on 17 June 1946. It reformed on 1 April 1951 to control Initial Training Wings and Grading Schools. All units were transferred to 21 Group on 24 June 1953. Disbanded 10 July 1953.
No. 60 Group RAF	1940–1946	No. 60 (Signals) Group was formed on 23 March 1940 to control radio direction finder (RDF) (Radar) stations and other Radio units in Fighter Command. Amalgamated with 26 (Signals) Group to form 90 (Signals) Group on 25 April 1946.
No. 61 Group RAF	1940; 1946–1959	No. 61 Group was first formed on 1 July 1940 in Northern Ireland, and was raised to command status and renamed RAF in Northern Ireland on 1 August 1940. Reformed as No. 61 (Eastern Reserve) Group on 2 May 1946 within Reserve Command, it was renamed No. 61 (Eastern) Group on 1 August 1950 and transferred to Home Command. It was renamed No. 61 (Southern Reserve) Group on 1 January 1957, and disbanded 31 May 1959.
No. 62 Group RAF	1946–1957	No. 62 (Southern Reserve) Group was formed on 15 May 1946 within Reserve Command, and renamed No. 62 (Southern) Group on 1 August 1950 when transferred to Home Command. It was absorbed into 61 Group on 1 January 1957.
No. 63 Group RAF	1946–1957	No. 63 (Western & Welsh Reserve) Group was formed on 2 May 1946 within Reserve Command, and renamed No. 63 (Western & Welsh) Group on 1 August 1950 when transferred to Home Command. It disbanded on 1 February 1957.
No. 64 Group RAF	1946–1958/59	No. 64 (Northern Reserve) Group was formed on 2 May 1946 within Reserve Command, and was renamed No. 64 (Northern) Group on 1 August 1950 when transferred to Home Command. It disbanded in 1958 or 1959.
No. 65 Group RAF	1946–1950/51	No. 65 (London Reserve) Group was formed on 2 May 1946 within Reserve Command, and renamed No. 65 (London) Group on 1 August 1950 when transferred to Home Command. It disbanded in 1950 or 1951.
No. 66 Group RAF	1946–1956/57	No. 66 (Scottish Reserve) Group was formed on 2 May 1946 within Reserve Command and renamed No. 66 (Scottish) Group on 1 August 1950 when transferred to Home Command. It disbanded in 1956 or 1957.
No. 67 Group RAF	1950–1957	No. 67 (Northern Ireland Reserve) Group was formed on 31 March 1950 from RAF in Northern Ireland. It was renamed No. 67 (Northern Ireland) Group on 1 August 1950 when transferred to Home Command. It disbanded on 28 February 1957.
No. 70 Group RAF	1940–1955	No. 70 (Army Co-Operation Training) Group was formed on 25 November 1940 from 22 (Army Co-operation) Group within Fighter Command. It was transferred to Army Cooperation Command on 1 December 1940, and to Air Defence of Great Britain on 1 June 1943, and finally disbanded on 17 July 1945. Order of battle on 1 June 1944, mostly target-towing Hurricanes.
No. 71 Group RAF	1940–1941	No. 71 (Army Co-Operation) Group was formed on 25 November 1940 from 22 (Army Co-operation) Group within Fighter Command. It was transferred to Army Cooperation Command on 1 December 1940, and disbanded on 14 August 1941.
No. 72 Group RAF	1942–1943	No. 72 (Army Co-Operation Training) Group was formed on 16 September 1942 within Army Cooperation Command. It disbanded on 1 August 1943.
No. 81 Group RAF	1940–1943; 1952–1958	No. 81 (Training) Group was formed on 16 December 1940 in Fighter Command to control Fighter Operational Training Units, and disbanded on 20 April 1943. Reformed as part of Fighter Command in January 1952 to control the command's training units. Disbanded in 1957.
No. 82 Group RAF	1941–1942	No. 82 (Fighter) Group was formed on 21 July 1941, and absorbed into RAF in Northern Ireland on 15 October 1942.
No. 84 Group RAF	1943–1947	No. 84 (Composite) Group was formed on 15 July 1943 within Second Tactical Air Force (2TAF). It disbanded on 15 December 1947.
No. 85 Group RAF	1943–1946; 1948–1950	No. 85 Group was formed on 17 December 1943 within Second Tactical Air Force (2TAF) from wings of the RAF Airfield Construction Service. It was renamed No. 85 (Base) Group on 14 February 1944, and reduced to the status of 85 Wing on 1 July 1946. It reformed on 1 December 1948, and disbanded on 1 July 1950.
No. 87 Group RAF	1945–1956	No. 87 (Transport) Group was formed on 17 February 1945, and renamed No. 87 (Transport) Group on 15 July 1945. Allocated to Second Tactical Air Force (2TAF) / British Air Forces of Occupation (BAFO), it was reduced to the status of 87 Wing on 15 July 1946.
No. 88 Group RAF	1945	No. 88 (Fighter) Group was formed in Edinburgh on 7 May 1945 for operations in Norway. It disbanded on 31 December 1945.
No. 90 (Signals) Group RAF	1946–1958; 1969–1973	No. 26 Group and No. 60 Group were amalgamated to form No 90. (Signals) Group on 24 April 1946, under the administrative control of British Air Forces of Occupation (BAFO) and Transport Command. It became an independent group in 1951 or 1952. It was raised to RAF Signals Command on 3 November 1958, reverting to group status on 1 January 1969 within Strike Command. It was transferred to Maintenance Command on 1 September 1972, and disbanded on 31 August 1973, becoming part of RAF Support Command.
No. 91 Group RAF	1942–1947	No. 91 (Training) Group was formed on 11 May 1942 by renaming No. 6 Group. It was renamed No. 21 Group on 1 May 1947.
No. 92 Group RAF	1942–1945	No. 92 (Training) Group was formed on 11 May 1942 by renaming No. 7 Group. It disbanded on 15 July 1945.
No. 93 Group RAF	1942–1945	No. 93 (Training) Group was formed on 15 June 1942, and disbanded on 14 February 1945.
No. 100 Group RAF	1943–1945	No. 100 (Special Duties) Group was formed on 3 December 1943 within Bomber Command for electronic warfare and countermeasures. It disbanded on 17 December 1945.
No. 106 Group RAF	1944–1946	In June 1943, No. 1 PRU was formed into 106 Wing, with five squadrons (Nos. 540, 541, 542, 543, and 544) and an Operational Training Unit. The Wing was elevated to group status in April 1944 as No. 106 (Photo Reconnaissance) Group, with two Spitfire (541 and 542) and two Mosquito (540 and 544) squadrons. It disbanded on 15 August 1946.
No. 200 Group RAF	1939–1942	No. 200 (Coastal) Group was formed on 25 September 1939 under the control of HQ RAF Mediterranean to control units operating from RAF Gibraltar. It was transferred to Coastal Command in November / December 1940, and renamed AHQ Gibraltar on 1 May 1942.
No. 201 Group RAF	1939–1944	No. 201 (General Reconnaissance) Group was formed on 18 September 1939 from the General Reconnaissance Group, Middle East. It was renamed No. 201 (Naval Co-operation) Group on 3 October 1941, and absorbed into Air Defence Eastern Mediterranean on 1 February 1944.
No. 202 Group RAF	1939–1941; 1944	No. 202 (Operations) Group was formed on 21 September 1939 by renaming RAF Egypt Group, and was absorbed in 204 Group on 12 April 1941. It reformed on 26 May 1941, and renamed AHQ Egypt on 1 December 1941. It reformed on 11 July 1944 to administer RAF units involved on Operation Dragoon, and disbanded on 7 November 1944.
No. 203 Group RAF	1940–1945	No. 203 (Maintenance) Group was formed on 17 August 1940 from HQ RAF Sudan. It was renamed No. 203 (Training) Group on 10 May 1943, and disbanded on 28 February 1945.
No. 204 Group RAF	1941	No. 204 (Operations) Group was formed on 12 April 1941 by renaming HQ RAF Cyrenaica. It was renamed AHQ Western Desert on 21 October 1941.
No. 205 Group RAF	1941–1956	No. 205 (Heavy Bomber) Group was formed on 23 October 1941 by renaming 257 Wing. It disbanded on 15 April 1956.
No. 206 Group RAF	1941–1946; 1951–1954	No. 206 (Maintenance) Group was formed on 1 September 1941 by renaming Maintenance Group, and disbanded on 28 February 1946. Reformed on 1 June 1951 as No. 206 (Base Maintenance) Group, it disbanded on 31 August 1954.
No. 207 Group RAF	1941–1942	No. 207 (General Purpose) Group was formed on 15 December 1941 by renaming AHQ East Africa, reverting to AHQ East Africa on 16 November 1942.
No. 209 Group RAF	1942–1944	No. 209 (Fighter) Group was formed on 15 December 1942 by upgrading 263 Wing. It disbanded on 15 November 1944.
No. 210 Group RAF	1943–1945	No. 210 (Fighter) Group was formed on 1 May 1943, and disbanded on 1 May 1944. It reformed on 6 July 1944 to control coastal air forces in North Africa and Western Mediterranean, and transferred to AHQ Malta in January 1945. It disbanded on 25 April 1945.
No. 211 Group RAF	1941–1945	No. 211 (Medium Bomber) Group was formed on 10 December 1941 by renaming Nucleus Group Western Desert. It disbanded on 3 February 1942. Reformed as No. 211 (Offensive Fighter) Group on 12 March 1942, but reduced to 'Z' Sector, Northwest African Air Forces on 17 September 1943.
No. 212 Group RAF	1942–1946	No. 212 (Fighter Control) Group was formed on 1 December 1942, as part of the Western Desert Air Force. It was later transferred to AHQ Egypt, but disbanded on 31 January 1946.
No. 213 Group RAF	1941–1943	No. 213 (Operational) Group was formed on 15 December 1941 by renaming Advanced AHQ Levant. It disbanded on 15 November 1943.
No. 214 Group RAF	1942–1945	No. 214 Group was formed on 1 January 1942 as part of AHQ Iraq, and merged with No. 217 Group on 30 November 1942. Reformed on 15 April 1943 as No. 214 (Maintenance) Group, it disbanded on 31 December 1945.
No. 215 Group RAF	1942–1943	No. 215 (General Reconnaissance) Group was formed on 1 May 1942 at Basrah. It disbanded on 1 November 1943.
No. 216 Group RAF	1942–1946	No. 216 (Ferry) Group was formed on 21 May 1942, and was renamed No. 216 (Air Transport and Ferry) Group on 9 September 1942. It disbanded on 26 October 1946.
No. 217 Group RAF	1942–1943; 1943–1944	No. 217 (Paiforce) Group was formed on 18 September 1942 from Persian Group, and disbanded on 1 May 1943. Reformed on 3 November 1943 within RAF Middle East, it disbanded on 29 February 1944.
No. 218 Group RAF	1942–1943; 1943–1946	No. 218 (Maintenance) Group was formed on 1 October 1942, and disbanded on 17 April 1943. Reformed on 30 November 1943, it disbanded on 20 June 1946.
No. 219 Group RAF	1942–1944; 1946	No. 219 (Fighter) Group was formed on 6 December 1942 as No. 219 (Fighter) Group, subordinate to AHQ Eastern Mediterranean, and disbanded on 27 July 1944. It reformed on 1 March 1946 by amalgamating AHQ Eastern Mediterranean, AHQ Egypt, and 206 Group. It was amalgamated with 205 Group on 1 December 1946.
No. 221 Group RAF	1941–1942; 1942–1945	No. 221 Group was formed on 21 April 1941 in Burma. Later renamed BURGROUP, it reverted to No. 221 Group on 15 December 1941. In February 1942, it was again renamed, this time as NORGROUP. It disbanded on 12 March 1942. Reformed on 12 March 1942 as a composite group in India, and later renamed first as No. 221 (Bomber) Group and then as No. 221 (Tactical) Group. It disbanded on 30 September 1945.
No. 222 Group RAF	1941–1945	No. 222 (General Reconnaissance) Group was formed on 1 September 1941. Renamed AHQ Ceylon on 15 October 1945.
No. 223 Group RAF	1941; 1942–1945	No. 223 Group was formed on 9 August 1941 by renaming Air Headquarters Far East. Planned to be renamed NORGROUP on 24 November 1941 and be established at HQ III Indian Corps to control cross-frontier air operations in Thailand under Operation Matador, involving use of No. 21 Squadron RAAF. On 8 December 1941, NORGROUP comprised No. 21 Squadron RAAF, No. 27 Squadron RAAF at Sungei Petani, No. 62 Squadron RAAF at Alor Star, No. 1 (GR) Squadron RAAF at Kota Bharu, and No. 36 Squadron RAF at RAF Seletar in Singapore; with Vildebeests, with a detachment at Gong Kedah. Reformed on 1 May 1942 as No. 223 (Composite) Group by renumbering 1 (Indian) Group. Renamed No. 1 (Indian) Group on 15 August 1945.
No. 224 Group RAF	1942–1945; 1957–1968	No. 224 (Fighter) Group was formed on 3 January 1942, but disbanded on 28 March 1942. Reformed on 1 April 1942, and renamed No. 224 (Tactical) Group on 1 December 1942. Disbanded by renaming as AHQ Malaya on 30 September 1945. Reformed on 31 August 1957 from AHQ Malaya, it disbanded on 1 October 1968.
No. 225 Group RAF	1942; 1942–1945	No. 225 (Bomber) Group was formed on 17 January 1942 by renaming 223 Group. It disbanded on 28 March 1942. Reformed as No. 225 (Composite) Group on 20 April 1942. It absorbed 2 (Indian) Group on 12 April 1942. Renamed No. 2 (Indian) Group on 1 October 1945.
No. 226 Group RAF	1942; 1942–1946	No. 226 (Fighter) Group was formed on 18 January 1942 in Singapore. After the surrender, the number was reused to control fighters in defence of Java. Not formally disbanded, but ceased to exist in March 1942. It reformed on 9 May 1942 as No. 226 (Maintenance) Group, and disbanded on 31 July 1946.
No. 227 Group RAF	1942–1946	No. 227 (Training) Group was formed on 6 June 1942. It was renumbered 4 (Indian) Group on 1 May 1946.
No. 228 Group RAF	1943; 1945–1946	No. 228 Group was formed on 22 February 1943, and disbanded on 15 May 1943. Reformed on 27 February 1945 as No. 228 (Administrative) Group, and renumbered, 3 (Indian) Group on 1 May 1946.
No. 229 Group RAF	1943–1947	No. 229 (Transport) Group was formed on 16 December 1943 from 179 Wing. It disbanded on 31 March 1947.
No. 230 Group RAF	1943–1945; 1952–1953	No. 230 (Maintenance) Group was formed on 15 December 1943, and absorbed into AHQ Burma on 16 May 1945. It reformed on 1 April 1952, and renamed AHQ Singapore on 16 February 1953.
No. 231 Group RAF	1943–1945	No. 231 (Bomber) Group was formed on 13 December 1943. It disbanded on 30 September 1945.
No. 232 Group RAF	1945–1946	No. 232 (Transport) Group was formed in March 1945, and disbanded on 15 August 1946. Officially a Transport Command group, operating under control of HQ Air Command South East Asia.
No. 233 Group RAF	1945–1946	No. 233 Group was formed on 28 March 1945, but disbanded on 30 June 1946. It was planned to control RAF units allocated to Operation Roger.
No. 238 Group RAF	1945	No. 238 (Airborne Assault) Group was formed on 20 April 1945, but reduced to 238 Wing on 11 September 1945.
No. 241 Group RAF	1942	No. 241 (Special Operations) Group was formed on 1 January 1942 in London, intended for operations in the Far East. It disbanded on 14 July 1942 without becoming operational.
No. 242 Group RAF	1942–1944	No. 242 Group was formed on 24 August 1942 in North Africa. It disbanded on 14 September 1944.
No. 246 Group RAF	1943	No. 246 Group was formed on 3 July 1943, but disbanded on 9 August 1943. It was formed on to control RAF units for the proposed defence of Portuguese airfields.
No. 247 Group RAF	1943–1946	No. 247 Group was formed in October 1943 within Coastal Command to control units operating from the Azores. It disbanded on 1 March 1946.
No. 300 Group RAF	1945–1946	Formed in Australia in late 1944 as 300 Wing, becoming No. 300 (Transport) Group on 24 April 1945. Officially part of Transport Command, it operated under the control of HQ Air Command South-East Asia to support the British Pacific Fleet. It was reduced to wing status on 31 March 1946.
No. 333 Group RAF	1942	No. 333 (Special Operational) Group was formed on 1 September 1942 for Operation Torch, and became Eastern Air Command on 19 November 1942.
Air Defence Group RAF	1927	Air Defence Group was formed on 18 July 1927 by renaming HQ Special Reserve and Auxiliary Air Force. It was renamed No. 1 Air Defence Group on 25 August 1927.
Armament Group RAF	1934–1937	Armament Group was formed on 1 February 1934. Transferred to Training Command on 1 May 1936, it was renamed 25 Group on 1 December 1937.
Experimental Group RAF	1918–1919	Experimental Group was formed on 16 August 1918 to control RAF experimental establishments. It disbanded on 1 January 1919.
Firth of Forth Group RAF	1918–????	Firth of Forth Group was formed on 1 November 1918 to control RAF Turnhouse, RAF Rosyth, and RAF Donibristle.
Technical Group RAF	1918–????	Technical Group was formed in November 1918 to control 2, 7, 8, and 10 Aircraft Acceptance Parks.
Indian Group RAF	1921–1922	Formed on 1 January 1921 when RAF India Command was demoted to group status. It was reorganised in October 1921, divided into four wings from two, although the number of squadrons were not increased. It ceased to exist when re-raised to command status on 1 April 1922.
No. 1 (Indian) Group RAF	1928–1947	Part of Royal Air Force, India.
No. 2 (Indian) Group RAF	1940–1947	Part of Royal Air Force, India.
No. 3 (Indian) Group RAF		Part of Royal Air Force, India.

== See also ==
- Command (military formation)
- Royal Air Force
- British Armed Forces
