= Llanbedr Airfield =

Aerodrome and planned spaceport in northwest Wales

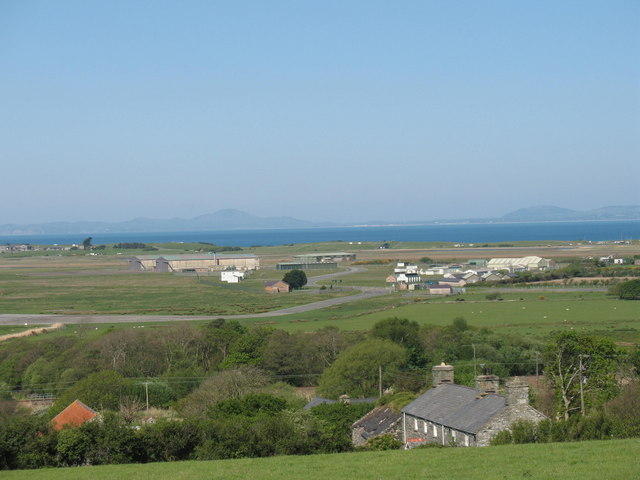
- Looking westwards from Llanbedr across the airfield with the Llyn Peninsula in the background.
- IATA: none; ICAO: EGFD

Summary
- Airport type: Private-owned, Public-use
- Owner: Llanbedr Airfield Estates LLP
- Location: Llanbedr, Gwynedd, Wales, UK
- Elevation AMSL: 80 ft / 24 m
- Coordinates: 52°48′18″N 004°07′38″W

Map
- Location in Gwynedd

Runways
Direction	Length		Surface
Direction	ft	m	Surface
05/23	4,328	1,319	Asphalt
15/33	4,207	1,282	Asphalt
17/35	7,500	2,286	Asphalt

Llanbedr Airfield (ICAO: EGFD) (Welsh: Maes Awyr Llanbedr), formerly RAF Llanbedr (ICAO: EGOD), is an operational general aviation aerodrome located in the Snowdonia National Park near the village of Llanbedr, Gwynedd, northwest Wales.

== History ==
It opened in 1941 as part of RAF Fighter Command's 12 Group. During its life, the base has been known as:

- RAF Llanbedr until 1957
- RAE Llanbedr until 1992
- T&EE Llanbedr (Test & Evaluation Establishment) until 1995.
- DTEO Llanbedr (Defence Test & Evaluation Organisation) until 1997
- DERA Llanbedr until 2001, when most of DERA became QinetiQ.

The site was (from Spring 1942) an operational base for Towed Target (and in 1943, became the home of the RAF's No. 12 Armament Practice Camp), and later, Target Drone services to the UK Armed Forces. Target provision services were typically to the Cardigan Bay Ranges (UK Danger Area EGD201, under the control of Aberporth) but Llanbedr targets also worked other UK ranges, including the Royal Artillery range off the Hebrides and occasionally overseas.

During the Second World War, RAF Llanbedr was home to thirty-two different RAF Squadrons on rotation who flew a variety of aircraft (Spitfire, Mustang, Typhoon, Anson, Lysander and Martinet). The longest serving Squadron was No. 631 Squadron (RAF) who arrived at Llanbedr in May 1945 from RAF Towyn and stayed until February 1949. The Squadron was re-numbered as No. 20 Squadron RAF.

The following squadron was here at some point:

- No. 20 Squadron RAF between 11 February and 10 July 1949 with the Martinet TT.1, Vampire F.1, Spitfire LF.16E and Harvard T.2B
- No. 41 Squadron RAF at various times between 11 August 1942 and 25 February 1943 with the Spitfire VB
- No. 66 Squadron RAF between 22 February and 1 March 1944 with the Spitfire LF IXB
- No. 74 Squadron RAF between 3 October 1941 and 24 January 1942 with the Spitfire IIA & VB
- No. 129 (Mysore) Squadron RAF between 30 March and 3 April 1944 with the Spitfire IX and Mustang III
- No. 131 (County of Kent) Squadron RAF at various times between 9 February and 14 May 1942 with the Spitfire VB
- No. 164 (Argentine–British) Squadron RAF between 12 and 21 April 1944 with the Typhoon IB
- No. 168 Squadron RAF between 21 January and 4 February 1944 with the Mustang IA
- No. 183 (Gold Coast) Squadron RAF between 11 and 22 April 1944 with the Typhoon IB
- No. 193 (Fellowship of the Bellows) Squadron RAF between 6 and 11 April 1944 with the Typhoon IB
- No. 198 Squadron RAF at various times between 30 March and 30 April 1944 with the Typhoon IB
- No. 232 Squadron RAF between 16 May and 3 August 1942 with the Spitfire VB
- No. 268 Squadron RAF between 7 and 20 February 1944 with the Mustang IA
- No. 302 (City of Poznan) Polish Fighter Squadron between 1 and 7 March 1944 with the Spitfire IX
- No. 306 (City of Toruń) Polish Fighter Squadron at various times between 19 December 1943 and 20 March 1944 with the Spitfire VB
- No. 308 (City of Kraków) Polish Fighter Squadron between 8 and 15 March 1944 with the Spitfire IX
- No. 310 (Czechoslovak) Squadron RAF between 2 and 15 December 1943 with the Spitfire VC
- No. 312 (Czechoslovak) Squadron RAF between 2 and 18 December 1943 with the Sptifire VC
- No. 315 (City of Dęblin) Polish Fighter Squadron between 19 December 1943 and 1 January 1944 with the Spitfire VB
- No. 322 (Dutch) Squadron RAF between 15 and 30 November 1943 with the Spitfire VB
- No. 329 (GC I/2 'Cicognes') Squadron RAF between 19 and 23 May 1944 with the Spitfire IX
- No. 331 (Norwegian) Squadron RAF between 5 and 21 January 1944 with the Spitfire IXB
- No. 332 (Norwegian) Squadron RAF between 5 and 21 January 1944 with the Spitfire IXB
- No. 340 (GC IV/2 Île-de-France) Squadron RAF between 15 and 19 May 1944 with the Spitfire IXB
- No. 341 (GC III/2 'Alsace') Squadron RAF between 11 and 16 May 1944 with the Spitfire IXB
- No. 349 (Belgian) Squadron RAF between 6 and 11 April 1944 with the Spitfire LF IXE
- No. 350 (Belgian) Squadron RAF between 8 and 19 February 1944 with the Spitfire IXB
- No. 485 Squadron RNZAF between 21 March and 7 May 1944 with the Spifire IXB
- No. 504 (County of Nottingham) Squadron AAF between 28 January and 4 February 1944 with the Spitfire VB
- No. 602 (City of Glasgow) Squadron AAF between 13 and 20 March 1944 with the Spitfire LF VB
- No. 609 (West Riding) Squadron AAF between 22 and 30 April 1944 with the Typhoon IB
- No. 631 Squadron RAF between 10 May 1945 and 11 February 1949 with the Hurricane IIC, Oxford, Martinet, Vengeance IV, Spitfire VB & XVI and the Vampire F.1
- Detachment of 776 Naval Air Squadron between 4 February and 28 June 1943

The following units were also here at some point:

- No. 5 Civilian Anti-Aircraft Co-operation Unit RAF between 16 September 1951 and 1 January 1958 within No. 63 Group RAF operated by Shorts
- No. 12 Armament Practice Camp RAF between 18 October 1943 and 21 February 1945 within No. 12 Group RAF
- No. 13 Armament Practice Camp RAF between 20 November 1943 and 21 February 1945 within No. 9 Group RAF and No. 12 Group RAF
- Detachment of No. 60 Operational Training Unit RAF during October 1943 within No. 9 Group RAF
- No. 136 Airfield Headquarters RAF between 11 and 22 April 1944 within No. 20 Wing RAF
- No. 1486 (Fighter) Gunnery Flight RAF between 8 July and 18 October 1943 within No. 9 Group RAF
- Flight of No. 6 Air Observer & Navigation School RAF became 29 September 1941 and 17 January 1942 within No. 50 Group RAF
- Detachment of No. 6 Air Observers School RAF between 17 January and 24 May 1942 within No. 50 Group RAF
- No. 1338 Wing RAF Regiment
- No. 3206 Servicing Commando between 26 April and 1 May 1944 within No. 84 Group RAF
- 'A' Flight of No. 3208 Servicing Commando within No. 11 Group RAF
- No. 2704 Squadron RAF Regiment
- No. 2709 Squadron RAF Regiment
- No. 2710 Squadron RAF Regiment
- No. 2732 Squadron RAF Regiment
- No. 2778 Squadron RAF Regiment
- No. 2793 Squadron RAF Regiment
- No. 2795 Squadron RAF Regiment
- No. 2882 Squadron RAF Regiment
- No. 2894 Squadron RAF Regiment

=== Post RAF ===
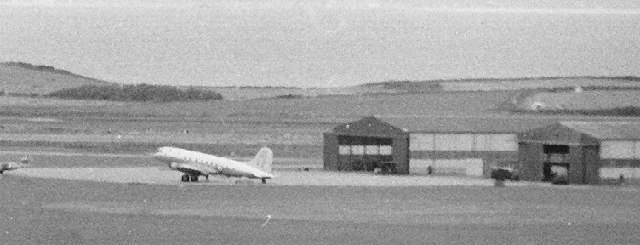

From 1957, civilianisation of the base services (typically airfield operation) began with Short Brothers holding a series of contracts until 1979, when Airwork Services took over and held them until 1991. In 1991, contracts and scope of work changed again and FR Serco took over its running.

Secondarily, it served as a Royal Air Force V bomber dispersal airfield, more recently used for military weapons training. The site closed in October 2004. Navigational and ATC equipment was removed by the military and the site put up for sale.

In May 2014 the aerodrome re-opened, catering for the needs of general aviation activities in the area.

=== Recent events ===
In recent years, the site has been used for agricultural purposes under the terms of an agreement with the Welsh Government, the current site owners.

It was reported in February 2008 that Welsh Ministers had awarded preferred bidder status for a 125-year lease to the operators of Kemble Airport near Cirencester. In May 2008, the Snowdonia Society, the Brecon Beacons Park Society and the Friends of Pembrokeshire National Park formed an alliance against the development of a new civilian airport at the site without a full public debate "best achieved by making an application for planning permission".

This campaign has been opposed by members of the local population who are in favour of the reuse and redevelopment of the site. A paper-based petition in favour of Kemble's plans for the airfield attracted over a thousand signatures, while an e-petition from the Snowdonia Society received 156.

In December 2008, the Welsh Government gave the go-head for Kemble to take over the airfield, subject to Kemble obtaining the "relevant permissions and consents." In November 2009, the Snowdonia National Park Authority took external legal advice and refused to issue certificates of lawful use to Kemble. In August 2011, a certificate was granted to Llanbedr Airfield Estates for use of the airport to test and develop unmanned aerial vehicles.

In August 2012, permission was granted to turn the airfield into a yard for the dismantling of airliners.

In January 2013 the Welsh Government included the site in the Snowdonia Enterprise Zone.

In June 2014 Fly Llanbedr Limited were awarded their licence to run a flight training and air experience operation from Llanbedr Airfield.

In July 2014 it was named as one of 8 possible locations for the UK spaceport the British government is looking to establish by 2018. The shortlist was reduced to 6 airports in March 2015, with Llanbedr still a candidate. As "Aerospace Wales", the operating company conducts research into future flight systems, including fixed-wing extended-duration drones, to provide cellular network phone coverage to the Welsh Mountain Rescue Service.

In June 2015 one of the hangars at Llanbedr Airfield was used for the Red Bull Air Race Barnstorming stunt, where Red Bull Air Race pilots Paul Bonhomme and Steve Jones flew two modified Xtreme Air Sbach XA41's in formation through the hangar itself.

In September 2015 the London Gliding Club based in Dunstable, Bedfordshire held an expedition to the airfield in order to take advantage of the unique soaring opportunities that the Site has to offer, which are often not accessible to soaring gliders originating from inland. In three weeks the club achieved 254 movements, with 436 flying hours recorded.

In September 2016 the London Gliding Club held another expedition to the airfield. In three weeks the club achieved 262 movements, with 455 flying hours recorded.

In October 2018 FlySnowdonia started operating as a flying school from the airfield operating two Robin DR400 aircraft.

== Blokarting ==
The airfield will be hosting the 2026 blokarting international championships The airfield has hosted European Blokart Championships in October 2023 and many National Championships.

== List of types flown from Llanbedr ==
Target tug

- Miles Martinet TT.I
- Westland Lysander TT.III
- Bristol Beaufighter TT.10
- de Havilland Mosquito TT.35
- Gloster Meteor TT.20
- English Electric Canberra B.2(TT), TT.18 WH734/WK128

Target drones

- Fairey Firefly U.8, U.9
- Gloster Meteor U.14, U.15, U.16
- GAF Jindivik various marks
- de Havilland Sea Vixen D.3 XS577 & XP924 from 1973 to 1991 (Note: XP924 now G-CVIX with De Havilland Aviation, Bournemouth. Since September 2014 XP924 has moved to RNAS Yeovilton (HMS Heron), Somerset. The aircraft is now owned by Naval Aviation Ltd and funded by the Fly Navy Heritage Trust and operated as a display aircraft.)

Communication and ferry role

- Avro Anson T.21
- de Havilland Devon C.2 XA880 until 1994
- Piper Navajo Chieftain ZF521 from 1994

Fast radar target/shepherding role for unmanned target drones/photochase

- Gloster Meteor
- BAe Hawk T.1 (XX154) Pre-production
- BAe Hawk T.1A (XX160/XX170/XX172) loaned from RAF Fleet ex Valley
- Hawker Hunter FGA.9 (XE601) loaned from Boscombe Down
- Dassault/Dornier Alpha Jet (ex GAF)
