= Brian Edmund Baker =

Royal Air Force Air Marshal (1896–1979)

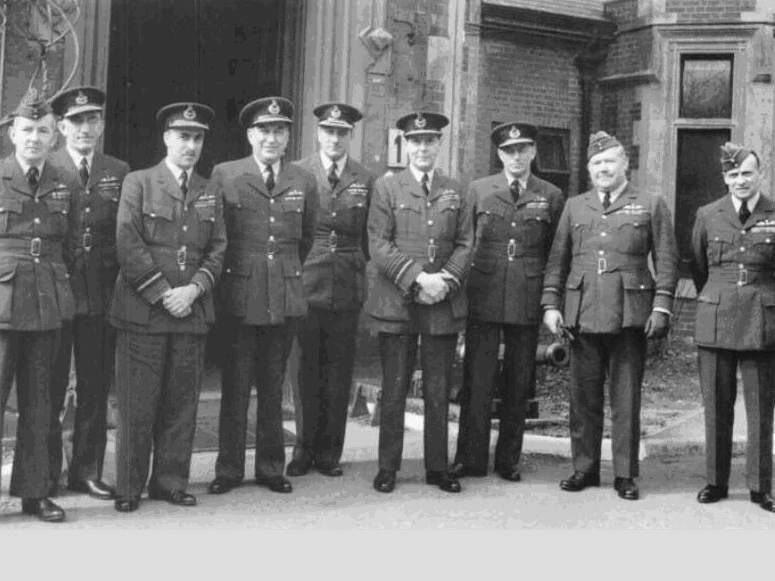
- Air Vice-Marshal Baker, first from left, at RAF Coastal Command, Northwood, World War II
- Born: 31 August 1896; Hertford, Hertfordshire
- Died: 8 October 1979 (aged 83); RAF Hospital Nocton Hall, Lincolnshire
- Military career
- Allegiance: United Kingdom
- Branch: British Army; Royal Air Force
- Service years: 1915–1950
- Rank: Air Marshal
- Units: Rifle Brigade; No. 13 Squadron RFC; No. 48 Squadron RFC
- Commands: No. 141 Squadron RAF; No. 4 Flying Training School; Aden Flight; Experimental Section, Royal Aircraft Establishment; No. 32 Squadron RAF; RAF Gosport; RAF Leuchars; No. 51 Group RAF; AHQ Iceland; No. 16 Group RAF; No. 19 Group RAF; Air Headquarters East Africa; RAF Transport Command
- Conflicts: World War I World War II
- Awards: Knight Commander of the Order of the British Empire; Companion of the Order of the Bath; Distinguished Service Order; Military Cross; Air Force Cross; Order of the White Lion (Czechoslovakia); War Cross (Czechoslovakia); Croix de Guerre (France); Polonia Restituta (Poland); Legion of Merit (US)

Air Marshal Sir Brian Edmund Baker KBE, CB, DSO, MC, AFC (31 August 1896 – 8 October 1979) was an officer of the Royal Air Force who served in both World Wars. He was a flying ace in World War I credited, in conjunction with his gunners, with twelve victories, comprising one enemy aircraft captured, four destroyed (including one shared), and seven "out of control" (including one shared).

== Biography ==
Baker was educated at Haileybury College between 1910 and 1914.

=== World War I ===
On 9 January 1915 Baker received a commission as a temporary second lieutenant, in the 15th (Service) Battalion of the Rifle Brigade.

In August 1915, Baker was transferred into the Royal Flying Corps, and received the Royal Aero Club Aviator's Certificate No. 1938 at the military flying school at Montrose on 25 October 1915. On 7 December 1915 Baker was assigned to the General List, attached to the Royal Flying Corps, and appointed a flying officer. With only 12 hours of flight time in his log book, he was posted to No. 13 Squadron in France, flying the BE.2 aircraft.

On 6 February 1917, although still only a second lieutenant, he was appointed a flight commander, with the temporary rank of captain, in the newly formed No. 48 Squadron, flying the Bristol F.2B. Between June and November 1917 he gained 12 victories:

Victories
No.	Date	Aircraft flown	Opponent	Location
1	15 June 1917	Bristol F.2b (A7149)	Albatros D.III	North of Vitry
2	21 July 1917	Bristol F.2b (A7107)	Albatros D.V	Slype
3	22 July 1917	Bristol F.2b (A7146)	Gotha bomber	North-west of Ostend
4	27 July 1917	Bristol F.2b (A7170)	Albatros D.III	North-east of Nieuwpoort
5	28 July 1917	Bristol F.2b (A7170)	Albatros D.III	Ghistelles-Zevecote
6	19 August 1917	Bristol F.2b (A7170)	Albatros D.V	Ostend
7	21 October 1917	Bristol F.2b (A7170)	Albatros D.III	Ostend
8	31 October 1917	Bristol F.2b (A7170)	Pfalz D.III	North-east of Diksmuide
9	11 November 1917	Bristol F.2b (A7170)	Albatros D.III	North-east of Diksmuide
10	11 November 1917	Bristol F.2b (A7170)	Albatros D.III	North-east of Diksmuide
11	29 November 1917	Bristol F.2b (A7170)	Albatros D.III	Houthoulst Wood
12	29 November 1917	Bristol F.2b (A7170)	Albatros D.III	Armesvelde-Zarren

On 1 July 1918 Baker was appointed Officer Commanding No. 141 Squadron at RAF Biggin Hill, receiving promotion from captain to temporary major.

=== Inter-war career ===
After the war he remained with the RAF, serving as an instructor at the School of Technical Training. He trained as a flying instructor at the Central Flying School and in December 1921 was assigned to No. 4 Flying Training School at RAF Abu Sueir, Egypt. He later served on the staff of the Directorate of Training, before being appointed Officer Commanding, Aden Flight, in February 1924. In April 1925 he returned to No. 4 FTS as instructor and commander. He was promoted from flight lieutenant to squadron leader on 1 July 1925.

Baker was appointed Officer Commanding the Experimental Section at the Royal Aircraft Establishment in March 1926, and Officer Commanding No. 32 Squadron at Biggin Hill in December 1929. In December 1932 he was promoted to wing commander, and appointed chief flying instructor at RAF Leuchars.

Baker served aboard the aircraft carrier HMS Eagle in 1934, and was senior RAF officer aboard HMS Courageous from May 1935. He was appointed station commander at RAF Gosport in April 1937, with the rank of group captain from 1 July 1937, and then served as station commander at Leuchars from September 1938.

=== World War II ===
In May 1940 Baker was appointed Air Officer Commanding No. 51 Group, part of RAF Flying Training Command, receiving promotion to air commodore (temporary) in September. He then served as Air Officer Commanding AHQ Iceland from 1941, and Air Officer Commanding No. 16 Group from July 1942, receiving promotion to air vice marshal on 1 December 1942. He was transferred to command of No. 19 (Reconnaissance) Group, Coastal Command, in July 1943. He commanded Air Headquarters East Africa from January to June 1945. He was appointed Senior Air Staff Officer at Headquarters RAF Middle East in June 1945.

=== Post-war ===
From December 1945 Baker served as Deputy Air Commander-in-Chief RAF Mediterranean and Middle East. He was promoted to air marshal on 1 July 1947, and was appointed Air Officer Commanding-in-Chief RAF Transport Command in September 1947, serving in that post until his retirement from the RAF in May 1950.

Baker died on 8 October 1979 at RAF Hospital Nocton Hall, Lincolnshire, England.

== Honours and awards ==
- Military Cross (27 August 1917)

Second Lieutenant (Temporary Captain) Brian Edmund Baker, Rifle Brigade and Royal Flying Corps.
For conspicuous gallantry and devotion to duty. He led his patrol with great skill against a hostile formation, which he attacked, accounting for five enemy machines out of six. Later, he drove a hostile machine down in flames, and attacked and destroyed another one by diving 7,000 feet on to it and firing at such close range as to nearly collide with it. His gallantry has been at all times of great value to his squadron.

- Distinguished Service Order (4 March 1918)

Second Lieutenant (Temporary Captain) Brian Edmund Baker, MC, General List and Royal Flying Corps.
For conspicuous gallantry and devotion to duty. Whilst on patrol he engaged nine Albatross scouts, five of these being driven down, two of which he accounted for. On another occasion, whilst leading his flight on in offensive patrol, he dived alone on a formation of six enemy scouts, driving one down out of control. During the course of his patrol work he has brought down ten enemy machines, and his work on all occasions has been magnificent. He is a dashing patrol leader, and inspires all with the greatest keenness.

- Croix de Guerre (France, 16 April 1918).
- Air Force Cross (1 January 1919).
- Companion of the Order of the Bath (2 June 1943).
- Knight Commander of the Order of the British Empire (15 August 1944), "in recognition of his distinguished services in connection with operations in Normandy".
- Commander with Star of the Order of Polonia Restituta (Poland, June 1945).
- Grand Officer of Order of the White Lion (Czechoslovakia, March 1946).
- War Cross (Czechoslovakia, July 1946).
- Legion of Merit (United States, September 1949).

== Cricket ==
Brian Edmund Baker
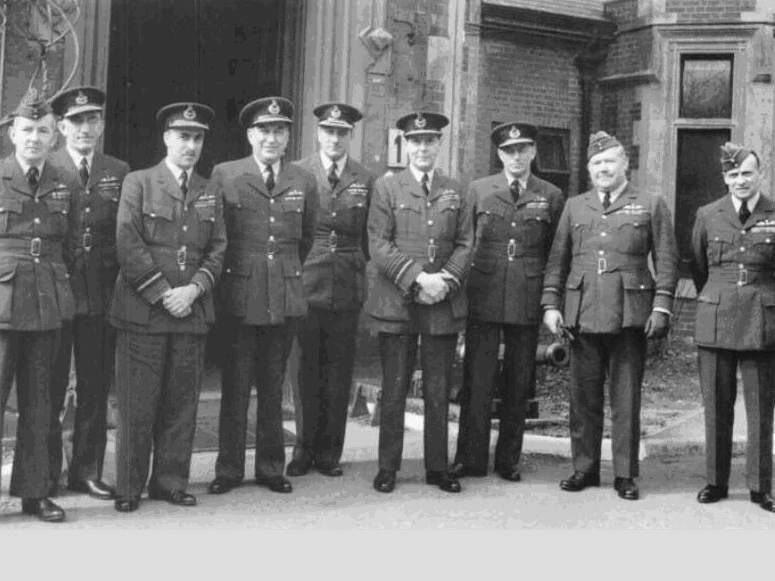

Cricket information
- Batting: Right-handed

Domestic team information
- Years: Team
- 1927–1932: Royal Air Force

Career statistics
Competition	First-class
Matches	8
Runs scored	303
Batting average	25.25
100s/50s	0/2
Top score	66
Catches/stumpings	5/–
- Source: ESPNCricinfo, 2 September 2014

Baker was a keen cricketer, and as a right-handed batsman, he played for Haileybury College nine times between 1912 and 1914, and twice for Hertfordshire in the Minor Counties Championship in August 1914. Between 1925 and 1932 he made thirteen appearances for the Royal Air Force cricket team, eight at first-class level, and served as Team Captain between 1928 and 1930. He was also a member of the RAF hockey team in 1927.

Military offices
Preceded by Sir Ralph Cochrane	Commander-in-Chief Transport Command; 1947–1950	Succeeded by Sir Aubrey Ellwood
