= No. 61 Group RAF =

No. 61 Group RAF No. 61 (Southern Reserve) Group RAF No. 61 (Eastern) Group RAF No. 61 (Eastern Reserve) Group RAF
- Active: 6 July 1940 – 1 August 1940; 2 May 1946 – 31 March 1959
- Country: United Kingdom
- Branch: Royal Air Force
- Type: Group
- Part of: RAF Home Command
- Garrison/HQ: RAF Kenley

No. 61 Group RAF is a former Royal Air Force group which was operational initially between July and August 1940 then between May 1946 and March 1959.

61 Group had three other groups amalgamated into it, these were: No. 62 Group RAF on 1 February 1957 and No. 65 Group RAF on 1 February 1951.

== History of No. 61 Group RAF ==
No. 61 Group RAF was formed on 1 July 1940 at Aldergrove before moving on 7 July 1940 to Dunlambert Hotel, Fort William Park, Belfast. It was redesignated to RAF NI on 1 August 1940. It was reformed on 2 May 1946 as No. 61 (Eastern Reserve) Group within Rickmansworth, moving to RAF Kenley on 1 August 1946. It was renamed to No. 61 (Eastern) Group on 1 August 1950, on 1 January 1957 it was renamed to No. 61 (Southern Reserve) Group and was disbanded on 31 March 1959.

During April 1953 the group controlled:

- RAF Booker
  - University of London Air Squadron
- Cambridge City Airport
  - Cambridge University Air Squadron
  - No. 22 Reserve Flying School RAF
- RAF Fairoaks
  - No. 18 Reserve Flying School RAF
- RAF Farnborough
  - Meteorological Research Flight RAF
- RAF Hendon
  - No. 1958 Reserve Air Observation Post Flight RAF
- RAF Henlow
  - No. 1959 Reserve Air Observation Post Flight RAF
  - No. 1961 Reserve Air Observation Post Flight RAF
- RAF Hornchurch
  - No. 17 Reserve Flying School RAF
  - No. 1 Civilian Anti-Aircraft Co-operation Unit RAF
- RAF Kenley
  - No. 661 Squadron RAF
  - No. 1957 Reserve Air Observation Post Flight RAF
  - No. 1960 Reserve Air Observation Post Flight RAF
- RAF Little Snoring
  - No. 2 Civilian Anti-Aircraft Co-operation Unit RAF
- RAF Redhill
  - No. 15 Reserve Flying School RAF

== History of No. 62 Group RAF ==
No. 62 (Southern Reserve) Group RAF was operational between 15 May 1946 and 31 and 1 February 1957. It was initially based within Exeter but moved to RAF Middle Wallop on 2 July 1946 then to RAF Rudloe Manor on 26 January 1948. Tt was renamed to No. 62 (Southern) Group RAF on 1 August 1950 then moved to RAF Pucklechurch on 16 June 1952 and was disbanded into No. 61 Group on 1 February 1957.

During April 1953 the group controlled:

- RAF Blackbushe
  - No. 622 Squadron RAF
- RAF Booker
  - No. 622 Squadron RAF
  - No. 1 (Basic) Flying Training School RAF
- RAF Colerne
  - No. 622 Squadron RAF
  - No. 1956 Reserve Air Observation Post Flight RAF
  - No. 1963 Reserve Air Observation Post Flight RAF
- RAF Exeter
  - No. 662 Squadron RAF
  - No. 10 Reserve Flying School RAF
  - No. 3 Civilian Anti-Aircraft Co-operation Unit RAF
- RAF Filton
  - Bristol University Air Squadron
- RAF Hamble
  - No. 14 Reserve Flying School RAF
  - No. 1 Basic Air Navigation School RAF
- RAF Kidlington
  - Oxford University Air Squadron
- RAF Middle Wallop
  - No. 1962 Reserve Air Observation Post Flight RAF
- Southampton Airport
  - Southampton University Air Squadron

== History of No. 65 Group RAF ==
No. 65 (London Reserve) Group was operational between 2 May 1946 and 1 February 1951. It was renamed to No. 65 (London) Group on 1 August 1950 and was disbanded into No. 61 Group on 1 February 1951.

== See also ==
- List of Royal Air Force groups
