= Hawarden Airport =

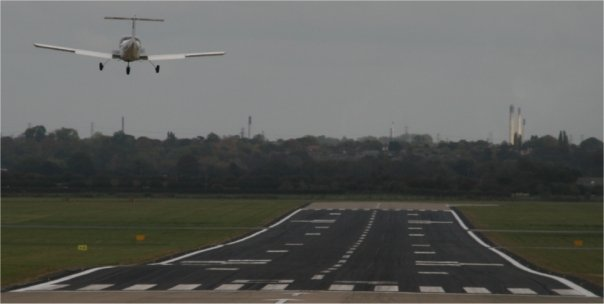
- IATA: CEG; ICAO: EGNR

Summary
- Airport type: Public
- Operator: Airbus UK
- Serves: North East Wales, Chester
- Location: Hawarden, Flintshire, Wales, UK
- Elevation AMSL: 45 ft (14 m)
- Coordinates: 53°10′41″N 002°58′40″W
- Website: hawardenaerodrome.co.uk

Map
- Location in Flintshire

Runways
Direction	Length		Surface
Direction	m	ft	Surface
04/22	2,042	6,699	Asphalt/Concrete

Statistics (2022)
- Movements: 36,065
- Sources: UK AIP at NATS; Statistics from the UK Civil Aviation Authority

Hawarden Airport (IATA: CEG, ICAO: EGNR), also known as Hawarden Aerodrome, is an airport near Hawarden in Flintshire, Wales, near the border with England and 3.5 NM (6.5 km; 4.0 mi) west southwest of the city of Chester.

Aviation Park Group (APG) is based at the airport and provides handling and related services to private clients. APG has a longterm tenancy agreement with Airbus UK, giving sole handling rights at the site. A large Airbus factory, which produces aircraft wings, is located at the airport. The factory is known as the Broughton factory, named after the nearest village.

== History ==
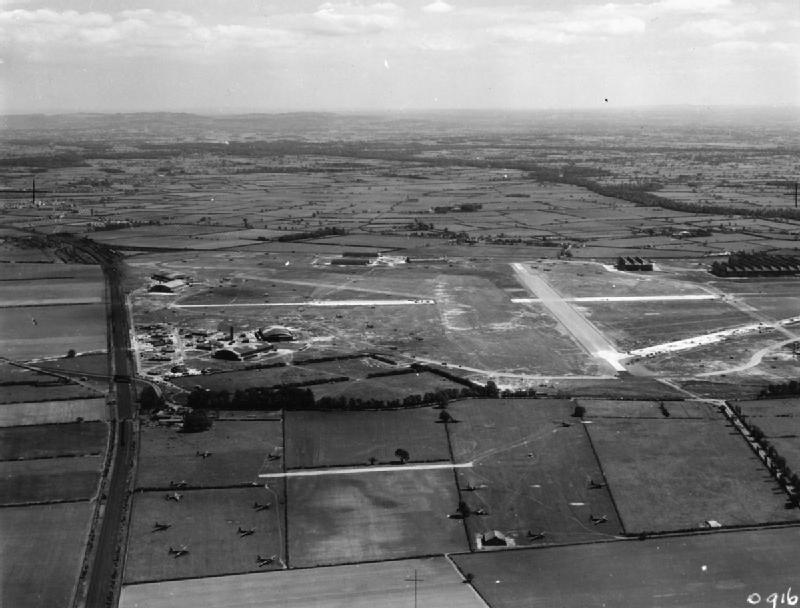
RAF Hawarden in World War II viewed from north-north-west

The aircraft factory at Broughton was established early in the Second World War as a shadow factory for Vickers-Armstrongs Limited. The factory produced 5,540 Vickers Wellington long-range medium bombers and 235 four-engined Avro Lancaster heavy bombers. PA474 is one of only two Lancasters remaining in airworthy condition out of the 7,377 that were built. PA474 rolled off the production line at the Broughton factory on 31 May 1945, just after the war in Europe came to an end, so she was prepared for use against the Japanese as part of the 'Tiger Force'. PA474 is now part of the RAF's Battle of Britain Memorial Flight.

Post-war the factory was used by Vickers to build 28,000 aluminium prefab bungalows.

The RAF's No. 48 Maintenance Unit was formed at Hawarden on 1 September 1939 and until 1 July 1957 stored, maintained and scrapped military aircraft, including Horsa gliders, de Havilland Mosquitoes, Handley Page Halifaxes and Vickers Wellingtons. It was located on the northwest portion of the airfield.

No. 7 Operational Training Unit was formed on 15 June 1940 at RAF Hawarden under the command of Wg Cdr J R Hallings-Pott. The unit operated a variety of aircraft including Supermarine Spitfires and for a short while Hawker Hurricanes, both British single-seat fighter aircraft, Miles Master two-seat trainers and Fairey Battles, an obsolete British single-engine light bomber aircraft which were used for target-towing duties. During the Battle of Britain in September 1940, it flew operational flights over north west England against Luftwaffe raids on Liverpool and against Broughton itself, claiming three enemy aircraft shot down one of which was brought down by the C.O. himself; Citation for the award of the Air Force Cross, "HALLINGS-POTT, A/G/C (26043, Royal Air Force) – No 57 Operational Training Unit. The success of No 57 Operational Training Unit is very largely due to the very exceptional work performed by Group Captain Hallings-Pott, firstly as wing commander in charge of training and later as commanding officer. His personal example both in the air and on the ground has proved a valuable incentive to the instructors and pupils alike. On one occasion, while employed as officer in charge of flying, this officer "scrambled" and shot down a German aircraft which passed over within a few minutes of sighting, and came in full view from the aerodrome. This was a magnificent display for the pupils." ( Source – Air 2/8901). A number of experienced pilots were posted to the unit as instructors, some to rest after front-line operations, especially after the Battle of France such as Flt. Lt. Peter Powell, others being too old to see front-line service, one being WWI 'Ace' Ira 'Taffy' Jones who became the Unit C.O. shortly after his posting to the unit.

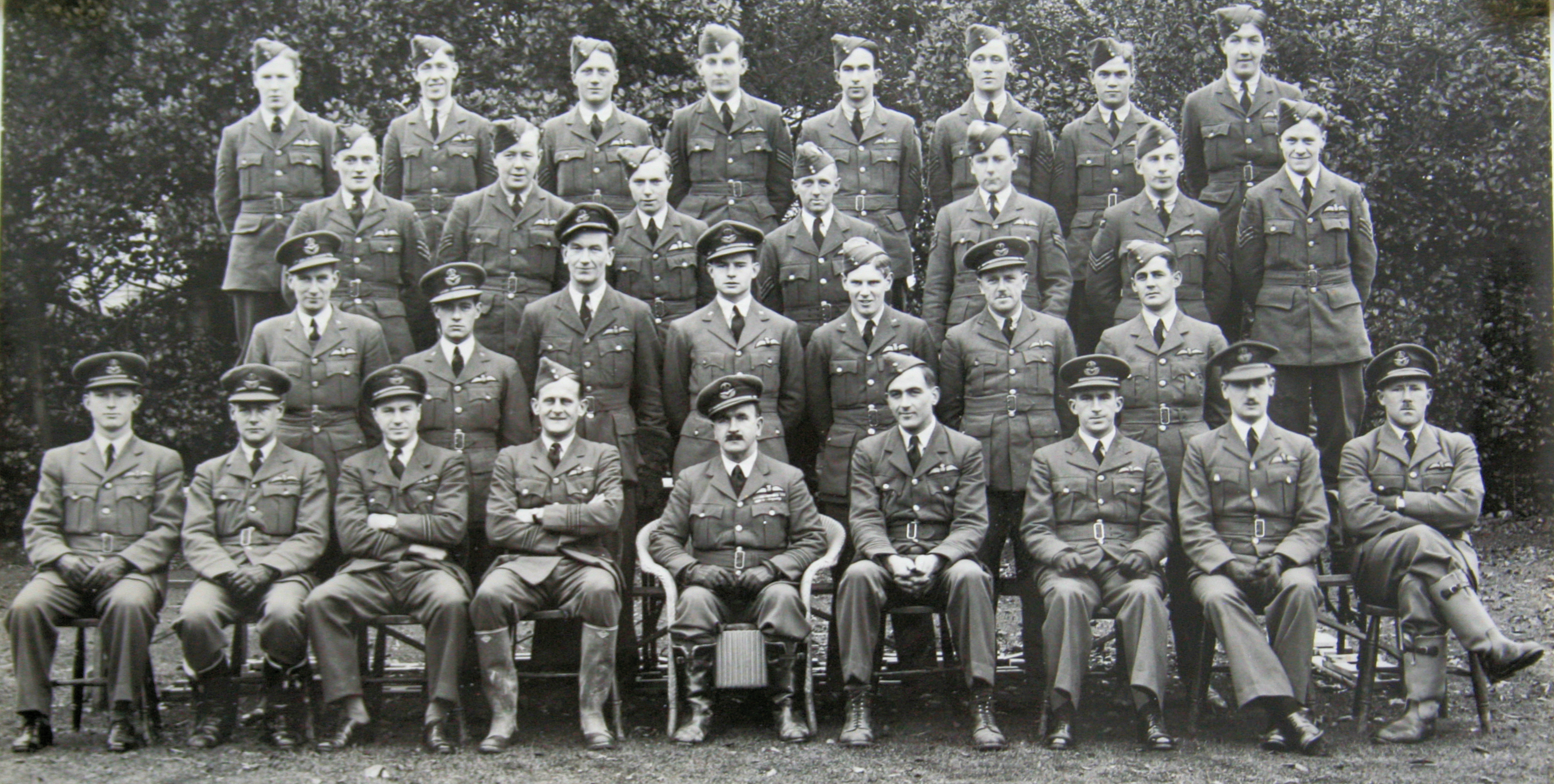
Photograph of 7 O.T.U. pupils and instructors taken at Hawarden in October 1940, Wing Commander Ira 'Taffy Jones seated in the middle of the front row.

Many trainee pilots from the dominions were trained there along with a number of Americans who had forefeited their US citizenship to join the RCAF so that they could join the fight against the enemy. The unit was initially disbanded on 1 November 1940 to become No. 57 OTU. Notable pupils who went on to greater things were George 'Screwball' Beurling who put all his tuition from 'X' Squadron C.O. and Battle-of-Britain Ace, Bob Doe and book-worming on aerial gunnery techniques to good use by tearing the gunnery targets being towed by a dawdling Battle to shreds on numerous occasions, later becoming the top-scoring 'Ace' over the besieged Mediterranean island of Malta, scoring twenty-six kills in just four months. Another 57 O.T.U. pupil who went on to do great things was American, Don Gentile who became the leading US Army Air Force Ace, gaining 27.8 victories in the air and on the ground before being returned to the US on leave in 1944. One event which occurred upon Gentile's graduation from 57 O.T.U. nearly put paid to his flying career in the RAF. Upon the discovery of his posting to another Training Unit as an Instructor, not to a front-line Squadron as a Fighter Pilot as he'd wanted, Gentile was so upset that he decided to behave as little like an Instructor as possible by 'beating-up' the local Dog Racing Track and ending up being confined to his quarters awaiting court-martial. Luckily for him his lawyer managed to get him off the charge due to the technicality that Hawarden's three mile radius low-flying area included the dog track! In November 1942 57 O.T.U moved to RAF Eshott in Northumberland as the unit's training syllabus requirements had outgrown the capacity of such a busy airfield, especially with the number of aircraft being flight-tested after being produced at the factory.

This did not spell the end of Operational Training Unit use at the airfield though as 41 O.T.U. moved in almost immediately after the departure of 57's Spitfires, bringing their Hurricanes, Tomahawks and Mustang Is from Old Sarum where they had been engaged in instruction in the art of Army Cooperation, much of which involved low-level reconnaissance and photography.

No. 3 Ferry Pilots Pool/Ferry Pool, Air Transport Auxiliary, was based at Hawarden between 5 November 1940 and 30 November 1945. Its pilots ferried thousands of military aircraft from the factories and maintenance facilities at Hawarden and elsewhere to and from RAF and Naval squadrons throughout the UK.

On 1 July 1948 The de Havilland Aircraft Company took over the Vickers factory and over the years built the following aircraft types:

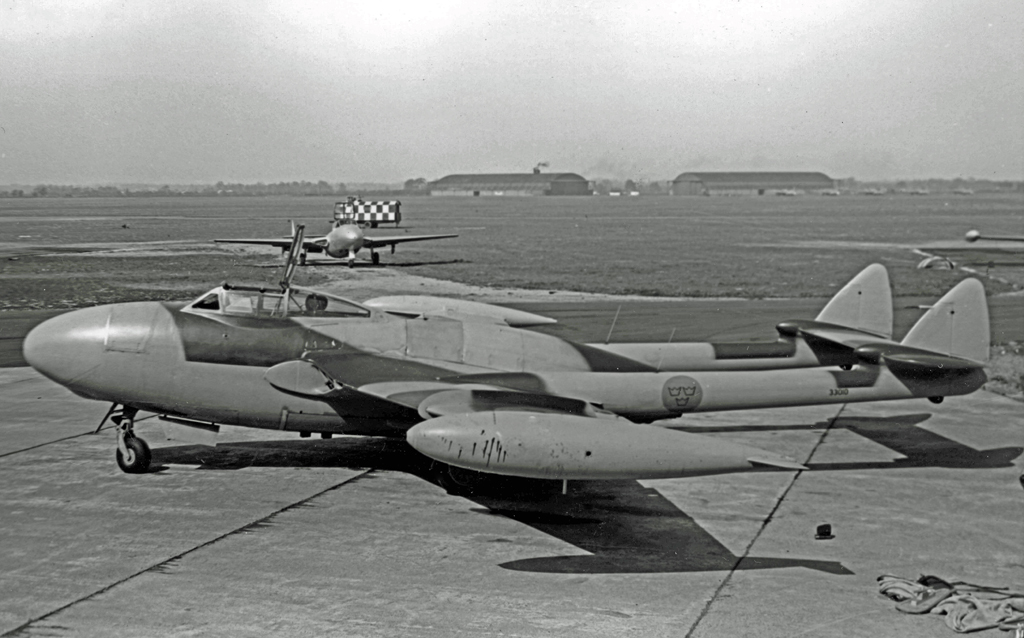
Newly built DH Venom and Vampire aircraft at Chester in 1953 with 48 MU hangars in the background

- de Havilland Mosquito – 88 built in total (82 NF.38 and 6 TR.37 variants)
- de Havilland Hornet
- de Havilland Sea Hornet
- de Havilland Vampire
- de Havilland Venom and Sea Venom
- de Havilland Dove and Devon – 500 Doves built
- de Havilland Comet – 15 built including two that became prototypes for the Hawker Siddeley Nimrod
- de Havilland Canada DHC-1 Chipmunk – 889 built
- de Havilland Canada Beaver (assembly only)
- de Havilland Sea Vixen
- de Havilland Heron – c.140 built

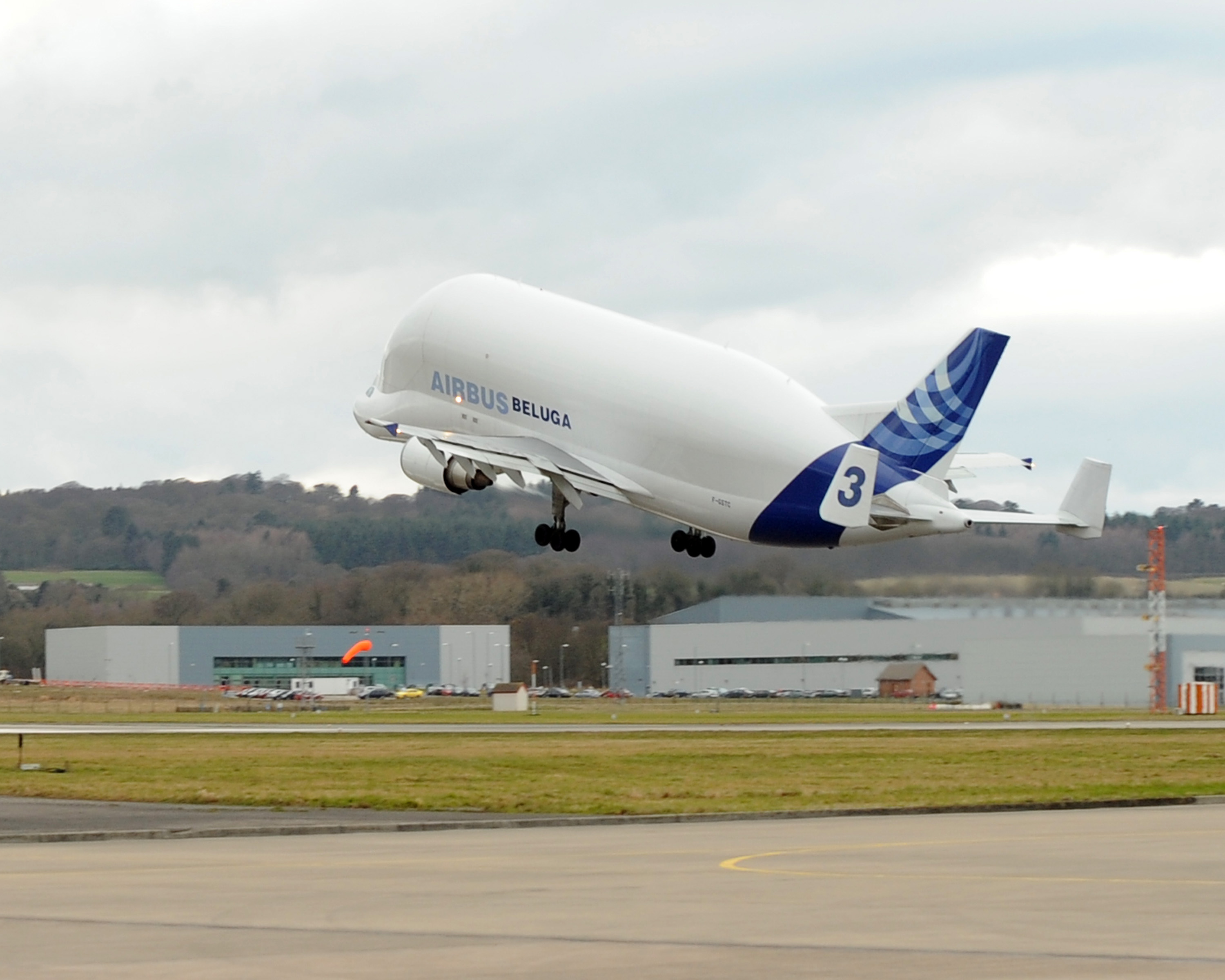
An Airbus A300 Beluga takes off from Hawarden in January 2007, carrying aircraft wings to Germany

The company became part of Hawker Siddeley Aviation in the 1960s and the production of the Hawker Siddeley HS125 business jet, designed by de Havilland as the DH.125, became the main aircraft type produced by the factory for nearly forty years. Production (final assembly) was moved to the United States in 1996 when the 125 business was sold to the Raytheon Corporation. Some parts continued to be manufactured at Broughton for some years after. (Production of the aircraft stopped in 2013 due to the bankruptcy of then owner Hawker Beechcraft). In 1977 the Broughton factory became part of British Aerospace operations. It is now owned and operated by Airbus, and has continued to be the centre of wing production for all models of Airbus commercial aircraft. The airport land includes a football ground named The Airfield, home of Welsh Premier League side Airbus UK Broughton F.C., which has movable floodlights due to its proximity to the runway.

The following units were also here at some point:

- No. 3 Aircraft Delivery Flight RAF
- No. 3 Ferry Pool ATA
- No. 3 Ferry Pilots Pool ATA
- No. 4 Ferry Pool RAF
- No. 4 (Home) Flying Unit RAF
- No. 5 Service Flying Training School RAF
- No. 7 Operational Training Unit RAF
- No. 9 (Service) Ferry Pilots Pool RAF
- No. 47 Maintenance Unit RAF
- No. 48 Maintenance Unit RAF
- No. 57 Operational Training Unit RAF
- No. 58 Operational Training Unit RAF
- No. 63 Group Communication Flight RAF
- No. 63 (Western & Welsh) Group RAF
- No. 63 (Western & Welsh Reserve) Group RAF
- No. 173 Squadron RAF
- No. 186 Gliding School RAF
- No. 192 Gliding School RAF
- No. 577 Squadron RAF
- No. 631 Gliding School RAF
- 808 Naval Air Squadron
- 885 Naval Air Squadron
- Home Command Modified Officer Cadet Training Unit

== Airlines and destinations ==
Although there have been scheduled services to Hawarden in past years, including a service from Liverpool to London via Hawarden operated by British Eagle in the 1960s and later Air Wales in 1977 (see below), there are currently no public scheduled passenger flights to the airport; most flights are chartered, or corporate, but the airport has frequent air freight flights provided by the Airbus Beluga to transport aircraft wings to Toulouse, Hamburg Finkenwerder and Bremen for Airbus. Airbus previously considered the A330-300 and A340-500 to require too much of the limited 1,663 m (5,460 ft) runway 04 at Hawarden, and chose the A330-200 as the base of a new version of the Beluga. A runway extension was considered, but abandoned when Airbus chose the A330-200 which could use the existing runway.

Until 2020, there were also regular shuttle flights to Bristol Airport (Lulsgate) and then on to Toulouse for Airbus workers. These were previously operated by Eastern Airways & the now defunct Flybmi, but were operated by Loganair using an Embraer 145 aircraft until the termination of the service due to the COVID-19 pandemic, leading to the closure of the Loganair base at Hawarden. The airport is also used as a back-up for scheduled flights to Anglesey whenever Anglesey Airport is closed.

There is much private and general activity at the airport, adding considerably to the number of aircraft movements. Operators include Aviation Park Group, which provides air taxi and charter services, MerseyFlight Air Training School, North Wales Military Air Services (NWMAS) and National Police Air Service which has based a Eurocopter EC135 Helicopter at the airport. Also operating from Hawarden Airport is Williams Aviation Ltd, which offers private jet charter.

The Airfield is strictly PPR (prior permission required).

== Air Wales at Hawarden Airport ==
Air Wales began operations at Cardiff Airport on 6 December 1977 using a 9-seater Piper PA-31 Navajo Chieftain (G-BWAL) on its twice-daily scheduled route from Cardiff to Hawarden Airport, Flintshire – a destination which was billed as "Chester" (even though Hawarden is in Wales and Chester is the other side of the Welsh/English border). Clwyd County Council provided the company with a start-up grant of £10,000 on the grounds that the service would improve communications between North East Wales and Cardiff. The single fare was £16.50. Notwithstanding the confined space of the aircraft, complimentary coffee was routinely served in-flight to passengers by the First Officer.

== Service centres ==
An aircraft service centre managed and owned separately from the Airbus operation is also located at the airport. Raytheon Systems opened a new facility in 2003, to support the Raytheon Sentinel entering service with the Royal Air Force.

Raytheon had a 125 and Beech 400 support centre on the airfield, which was renamed Hawker Beechcraft Ltd in early 2007. The service centre has had a number of owners over the years, the most recent being Beechcraft (formerly known as Hawker Beechcraft, and before that Raytheon). However, on 3 September 2013, the operation was sold to Marshall Aerospace (Cambridge) for an undisclosed sum. Recently, the service centre has gained approvals to service a number of Cessna and Beechcraft types.

North Wales Military Air Services (NWMAS) are also based here offering maintenance for classic military aircraft, such as the Jet Provost, Strikemaster and L-39, with three Strikemasters, one Jet Provost and an Aero L-39 operating from Hawarden for airshows and pilot training.

== Radio Mandatory Zone ==
Hawarden Airport is the first airport in the UK to have a permanent Radio Mandatory Zone (RMZ) established. RMZ is an "airspace of defined dimensions wherein the carriage and operation of radio equipment is mandatory". The aim is to enhance "the ‘visibility’ or conspicuity of aircraft operating within or in the vicinity of complex or busy airspace for the safety of all airspace operators".

After a 2-year consultation process this was approved by the Civil Aviation Authority (CAA) and took effect on 30 March 2017.
