= RAF Turnhouse =

Former Royal Air Force station in Edinburgh, Scotland (1915–1961)

RAF Turnhouse
- Edinburgh in Scotland

Site information
- Type: Sector Station
- Code: TS
- Owner: Air Ministry
- Operator: Royal Air Force
- Controlled by: RAF Fighter Command

Location
- Shown within RAF Turnhouse (the United Kingdom)
- Coordinates: 55°57′5″N 003°20′46″W

Site history
- Built: 1915 & 1939
- In use: 1915-1996
- Battles/wars: First World War; European theatre of World War II; Cold War

Airfield information
- Elevation: 30 metres (98 ft) AMSL
Runways
Direction	Length and surface
13/31	1,796 metres (5,892 ft) Concrete
08/26	799 metres (2,621 ft) Concrete
00/00	Concrete

Royal Air Force Turnhouse, or more simply RAF Turnhouse, is a former Royal Air Force Sector Station located in Edinburgh, Scotland. It is now part of Edinburgh Airport.

== History ==
A landing ground was first established at Turnhouse in 1915. The airfield was greatly expanded in the 1930s, with three concrete runways being laid in 1939/40. RAF Turnhouse closed in 1996 and its remaining facilities were acquired by Edinburgh Airport. The following units were located at Turnhouse at various times:

First World War

- No. 26 Reserve Squadron
- No. 26 Training Squadron
- No. 73 Training Squadron
- No. 84 (Canadian) Reserve Squadron
- No. 89 (Canadian) Reserve Squadron

Squadrons

- No. 3 Squadron RAF
- No. 44 Squadron RAF
- No. 63 Squadron RAF
- No. 64 Squadron RAF
- No. 65 Squadron RAF
- No. 77 Squadron RAF
- No. 81 Squadron RAF
- No. 83 Squadron RAF
- No. 104 Squadron RAF
- No. 122 Squadron RAF
- No. 123 Squadron RAF
- No. 141 Squadron RAF
- No. 151 Squadron RAF
- No. 164 Squadron RAF
- No. 165 Squadron RAF
- No. 197 Squadron RAF
- No. 207 Squadron RAF
- No. 232 Squadron RAF
- No. 241 Squadron RAF
- No. 242 Squadron RAF
- No. 243 Squadron RAF
- No. 245 Squadron RAF
- No. 253 Squadron RAF
- No. 263 Squadron RAF
- No. 268 Squadron RAF
- No. 289 Squadron RAF
- No. 290 Squadron RAF
- No. 303 Squadron RAF
- No. 309 Polish Fighter-Reconnaissance Squadron
- No. 312 (Czechoslovak) Squadron RAF
- No. 329 (Free French) Squadron RAF
- No. 340 (Free French) Squadron RAF
- No. 341 (G.C.III/2 'Alsace') Squadron RAF
- No. 598 Squadron RAF
- No. 603 Squadron RAF
- No. 607 Squadron RAF
- No. 666 Squadron RAF
- 801 Naval Air Squadron
- 807 Naval Air Squadron
- 808 Naval Air Squadron
- 848 Naval Air Squadron
- 882 Naval Air Squadron
- 884 Naval Air Squadron
- 886 Naval Air Squadron
- 895 Naval Air Squadron

Units

- No. 4 Aircraft Delivery Flight RAF (January 1942 – July 1943)
- No. 6 Gliding School RAF (January 1946 – May 1951)
- Detachment of No. 7 Anti-Aircraft Co-operation Unit RAF (March – April 1941)
- No. 12 Air Experience Flight RAF
- No. 13 Group Anti-Aircraft Cooperation Flight RAF (May – August 1941)
- No. 17 Group Communication Flight RAF (January 1942 – September 1945)
- No. 18 Group Communication Flight RAF (November 1959 – May 1960 & October 1964)
- No. 24 (Edinburgh) Group, Royal Observer Corps
- No. 59 Operational Training Unit RAF (December 1940 – February 1941)
- No. 66 Group Communication Flight RAF (September 1946 – October 1952)
- No. 66 (Scottish Reserve) Group RAF (August 1946 – August 1950) became No. 66 (Scottish) Group RAF (August 1950 – November 1954)
- No. 71 (Signals) Wing Calibration Flight RAF
- No. 72 (Signals) Wing Calibration Flight RAF
- No. 88 Group Communication Squadron RAF (May – June 1945)
- No. 129 (RAF) Wing RAF (May 1945)
- No. 130 Wing RAF (May – June 1945)
- No. 132 (Norwegian) (Fighter) Wing RAF (May – June 1945)
- No. 661 Volunteer Gliding School RAF (January 1958 – January 1964)
- No. 1353 (Anti-Aircraft Cooperation) Flight RAF (February – June 1946)
- No. 1968 Reserve Air Observation Post Flight RAF
- No. 2753 Squadron RAF Regiment
- No. 2770 Squadron RAF Regiment
- No. 3508 Servicing Unit RAF (December 1943 – March 1945)
- Aircraft Flight of Caledonian Sector HQ RAF (October 1951 – November 1957)
- Edinburgh University Air Squadron (January 1941 – December 1945 & October 1946 – January 1969) became East Lowlands University Air Squadron (January 1969 – February 1996)
- Fighter Flight, Shetlands RAF (December 1939)
- Midlothian Sector HQ RAF (1945 – April 1946)
- Detachment of Northern Communication Squadron RAF
- Scottish Sector HQ RAF (November 1949 – May 1950)
- Detachment of S.C.R.584 Training Unit RAF (May 1945)

== Current use ==
The site is now used by Edinburgh Airport.
