= No. 54 Group RAF =

Former Royal Air Force operations group

No. 54 (Training) Group RAF
- Royal Air Force Ensign
- Active: 30 August 1939 – 17 June 1946; 1 April 1951 – 10 July 1953
- Country: United Kingdom
- Branch: Royal Air Force
- Type: Royal Air Force group
- Part of: RAF Reserve Command

No. 54 Group RAF is a former Royal Air Force training group that operational between August 1939 and July 1953 during the Second World War and the Cold War.

== Structure ==
November 1939 – HQ at Reading

- Various Initial Training Wings

May 1941 – Torquay

- Aberdeen University Air Squadron
- Aberystwyth University Air Squadron
- Belfast University Air Squadron
- Bristol University Air Squadron
- Cambridge University Air Squadron
- Cardiff University Air Squadron
- Edinburgh University Air Squadron
- Glasgow University Air Squadron
- Leeds University Air Squadron
- Liverpool University Air Squadron
- London University Air Squadron
- Manchester University Air Squadron
- Newcastle University Air Squadron
- Oxford University Air Squadron
- Reading University Air Squadron
- St Andrews University Air Squadron
- Sheffield University Air Squadron
- Southampton University Air Squadron
- Swansea University Air Squadron

April 1942 – HQ at Sunningdale

- RAF Eastbourne = No. 1 Elementary Air Observers School RAF
- 15 Initial Training Wings

April 1943 – HQ at Sunningdale

- Various Initial Training Wings
- Air Crew Despatch Centre

July 1944 – HQ at Sunningdale

- Various Initial Training Wings
- Various Reception Wings
- Various Initial Training Schools

July 1945 – HQ at Sunningdale

- Various non-flying units

April 1953 – HQ at Benson

- Initial Training School
- No. 2 Initial Training School
- No. 3 Initial Training School
- No. 4 Initial Training School
- No. 5 Initial Training School
- No. 2 Grading School
- No. 1 Grading Unit (Airwork)
- No. 2 Grading Unit (Airwork)
