= White Waltham Airfield =

Airport in White Waltham, Berkshire, England

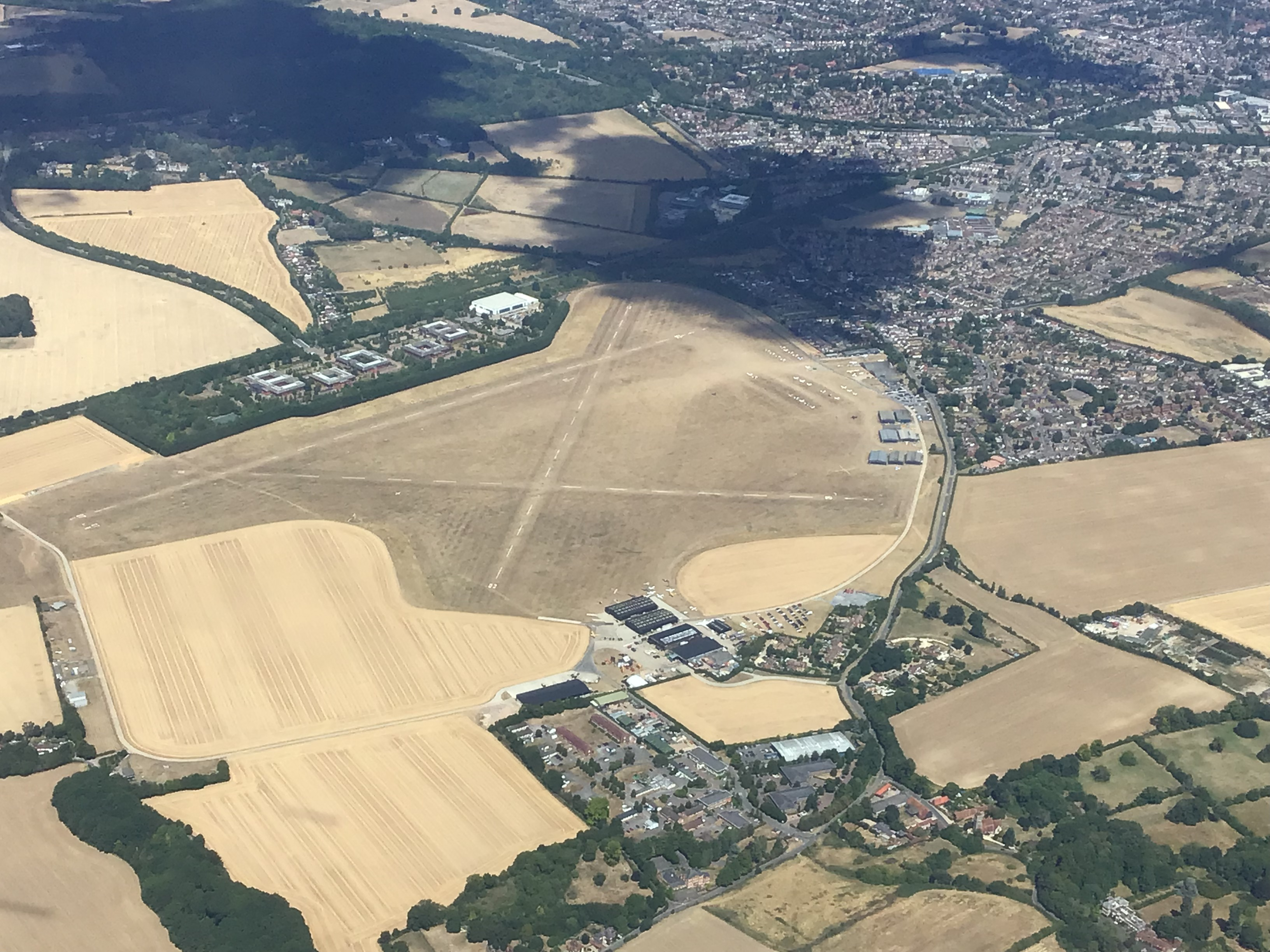
- IATA: none; ICAO: EGLM

Summary
- Airport type: Private
- Owner/Operator: West London Aero Club
- Location: White Waltham, Berkshire
- Elevation AMSL: 133 ft / 41 m
- Coordinates: 51°30′03″N 000°46′28″W
- Website: www.wlac.co.uk

Map
- Location in Berkshire

Runways
Direction	Length		Surface
Direction	m	ft	Surface
07/25	1,110	3,642	Grass
11/29	930	3,051	Grass
03/21	1,025	3,363	Grass
- Sources: UK AIP at NATS

White Waltham Airfield (ICAO: EGLM) is an operational general aviation aerodrome located at White Waltham, 2 nautical miles (3.7 km; 2.3 mi) southwest of Maidenhead, in the Royal Borough of Windsor and Maidenhead in Berkshire, England.

This large grass airfield is best known for its association with the Air Transport Auxiliary from 1940 to 1945 and also has a significant history of prewar flying training, wartime and postwar RAF use and postwar use as a flight test centre by the Fairey and Westland aircraft companies. In the mid-1950s it was HQ of RAF Home Command. It is now privately owned and is the home of the West London Aero Club.

== Operational history ==
The airfield was set up in 1928 when the de Havilland family bought 196 acres (0.79 km^{2}) of grassland to house the de Havilland Flying School. In 1938 the airfield was taken over by the government, and during the Second World War was the home of the Air Transport Auxiliary between its formation in early 1940 and disbandment during September 1945. The ATA staged a unique Air Display and Air Pageant at White Waltham on 29 September 1945 which was opened by Lord Beaverbrook and featured a memorable static park of Allied and German aircraft and the flying included Alex Henshaw displaying a Seafire Mk45.

After the war, the airfield was also used by Fairey Aviation and later Westland Helicopters, which assembled and tested aircraft built at their Hayes factory. These included the Fairey FB-1 Gyrodyne (1947), Fairey Jet Gyrodyne (1954), Fairey Ultralight (1955), Fairey Rotodyne (1957) & Westland Scout (1960) & Westland Wasp (1962). The prototype Fairey Gannet was first flown from Aldermaston but production aircraft were completed and first flown at White Waltham too. The example that was stored at the airfield has now been moved to the Solway Aviation Museum at Carlisle Lake District Airport where restoration is ongoing.

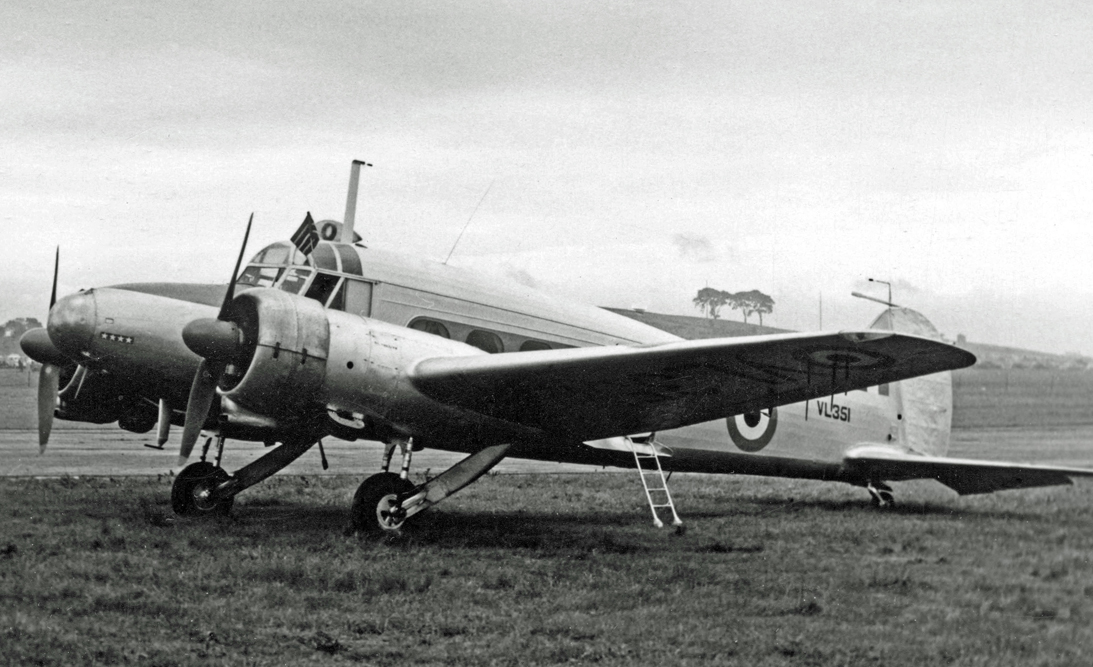
Avro Anson of the RAF's Home Command Communication Squadron based at White Waltham

Prince Philip, Duke of Edinburgh, was taught to fly at White Waltham in 1952, flying a de Havilland Canada DHC-1 Chipmunk belonging to HQ RAF Home Command Communications Squadron (HCCS) of the Royal Air Force. This squadron was based at the airfield from 1950 until 1959.

On 28 January 1961 the HQ of No. 25 (Flying Training) Group RAF, responsible for administering the Flying Refresher Schools and the Advanced Flying Schools moved from RAF Manby to RAF White Waltham. The group was operational for a further seven years, before eventually disbanding on 1 June 1968, and was absorbed into No. 22 Group RAF [No. 25 Group RAF].

The airfield stayed under RAF control until 1982, when it was purchased by the current owners. Until 2007 it was the base of Thames Valley & Chiltern Air Ambulance helicopter.

Approximately 150 light aircraft are based at the airfield which, with three runways, is reportedly the largest grass airfield in civilian use in Europe. The airfield holds Civil Aviation Authority Public Use Aerodrome Licence Number P773, that allows flights for the public transport of passengers or for flight training.

== Units ==
The following units were also here at some point:

- No. 1 Air Experience Flight RAF (September 1960 - April 1963)
- No. 1 Ferry Pool RAF (December 1945 - March 1946)
- No. 1 Ferry Pool ATA (November 1940 - March 1946)
- No. 3 Elementary Gliding Training School RAF (October 1942 - ?) became No. 123 Gliding School RAF (? - December 1943)
- No. 3 Ferry Pilots Pool ATA (February - November 1940)
- No. 6 Air Experience Flight RAF (September 1958 - August 1973)
- Detachment of No. 10 Radio School RAF during 1945
- No. 13 Elementary and Reserve Flying Training School RAF (November 1935 - September 1939) became No. 13 Elementary Flying Training School RAF (September 1939 - December 1940)
- No. 50 Group Communication Flight RAF (September 1939 - May 1947)
- No. 54 Group Communication Flight RAF (April 1943 - May 1944)
- No. 402 Air Stores Park (February - April 1944)
- No. 623 Gliding School RAF (September 1955 - May 1963)
- Army Co-operation Command Communication Flight RAF (December 1940 - May 1943) became 2nd Tactical Air Force Communication Flight RAF (June - July 1943)
- Air Transport Auxiliary Advanced FTS (April 1942 - November 1945)
- ATA Air Movements Flight (April 1942 - August 1945)
- ATA School (October 1940 - April 1942)
- ATA (Training) Ferry Pool (January 1941 - April 1943)
- Flying Training Command Communication Flight RAF (May 1940 - February 1942)
- Flying Training Command Communication Squadron RAF (April 1959 - April 1964)
- Reserve Command Communication Flight RAF (September 1939 and May 1940 & September 1946 - August 1950)
- Reserve Command Instrument Training Flight RAF (August 1948 - April 1949)
- Reserve Command Training Flight RAF (September 1948 - August 1950) became Home Command Training Flight RAF (August 1950) became Home Command Examining Unit RAF (August 1950 - 1951 & December 1951 - January 1959)
- RAF Staff College Communication Flight RAF (June - September 1946) became RAF Staff College Flight RAF (September 1946 - February 1948)
- Technical Training Command Communication Flight RAF (May 1940 - November 1945)
- Training Command Communication Flight RAF (January - May 1940)
- University of London Air Squadron (February 1959 - July 1968)

== Non-aviation events and Trivia ==
On 24 June 1989, the Fairey Hangar, on the north side of the airfield, was the venue for one of the largest acid house raves to be held at that time. The Sunrise Midsummer Party was attended by over 11,000 ravers, and attracted about 1,000 vehicles. This caused 3-mile (4.8 km) tailbacks on the approach to the airfield. The Sun newspaper ran a headline "Ecstasy Airport" the next day.

In October 2010, the airfield was turned into a 1950s London Heathrow Airport for the filming of the 2011 film My Week with Marilyn.

White Waltham Airfield also featured as the fictional Finchmere Airfield in the Midsomer Murders episode "The Flying Club", also using footage from the annual Retrofestival held at White Waltham.

The airfield plays a vital role as the hub for the Queens Flight in Nevil Shute's fiction " In the Wet" of 1953.

Many of the tasks in Series 11 of the Channel 4 programme Taskmaster took place at the airfield.

== See also ==
- Airports of London - Wikipedia
