= Bristol University Air Squadron =

University flying squadron of the Royal Air Force

- BUAS badge
- Active: 1941–present
- Country: United Kingdom
- Branch: Royal Air Force
- Role: Officer Training, Flying Training
- Part of: No. 6 Flying Training School
- Garrison/HQ: MOD Boscombe Down
- Motto(s): Audentior Ito (Latin: Go bolder)
- Colours: Black & Yellow
- Mascot(s): Wild Boar
- Equipment: Grob Tutor T1
- Website: Official website

Bristol University Air Squadron, commonly known as BUAS, is a University Air Squadron that recruits from the University of Bristol, University of Bath, University of the West of England, University of Exeter and University of Plymouth. Training nights are conducted at The Artillery Grounds on Whiteladies Road, Bristol, and flying is conducted out of MOD Boscombe Down, just north of Salisbury. The three primary avenues for development within the Squadron are Flying, Adventurous Training, and Force Development.

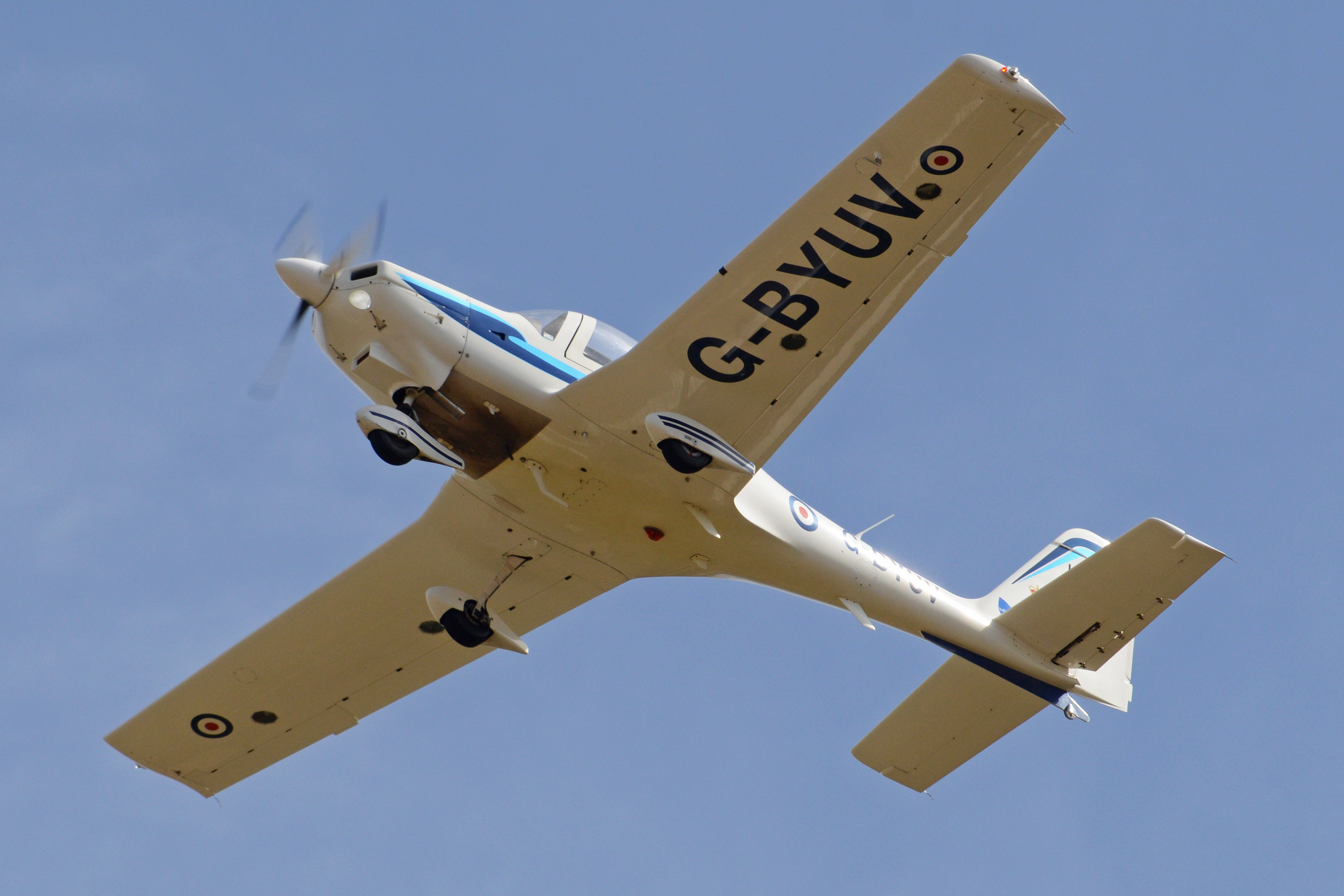
Grob Tutor T1 operated by Bristol University Air Squadron. Seen departing after taking part in the 2017 Royal International Air Tattoo. RAF Fairford, Gloucestershire, UK.

== History ==
Bristol University Air Squadron was formed on 25 February 1941 within No. 54 Group RAF, parented by RAF Filton. The squadron moved groups to No. 62 Group RAF on 15 May 1946 and was disbanded on 15 July 1946. The squadron was reformed on 1 December 1950 at Filton within No. 62 Group, parented by RAF Colerne.

In 1975 the Squadron reequipped with Scottish Aviation Bulldog T1 aircraft, which were in use until the introduction of the Grob Tutor T1 in October 2000.

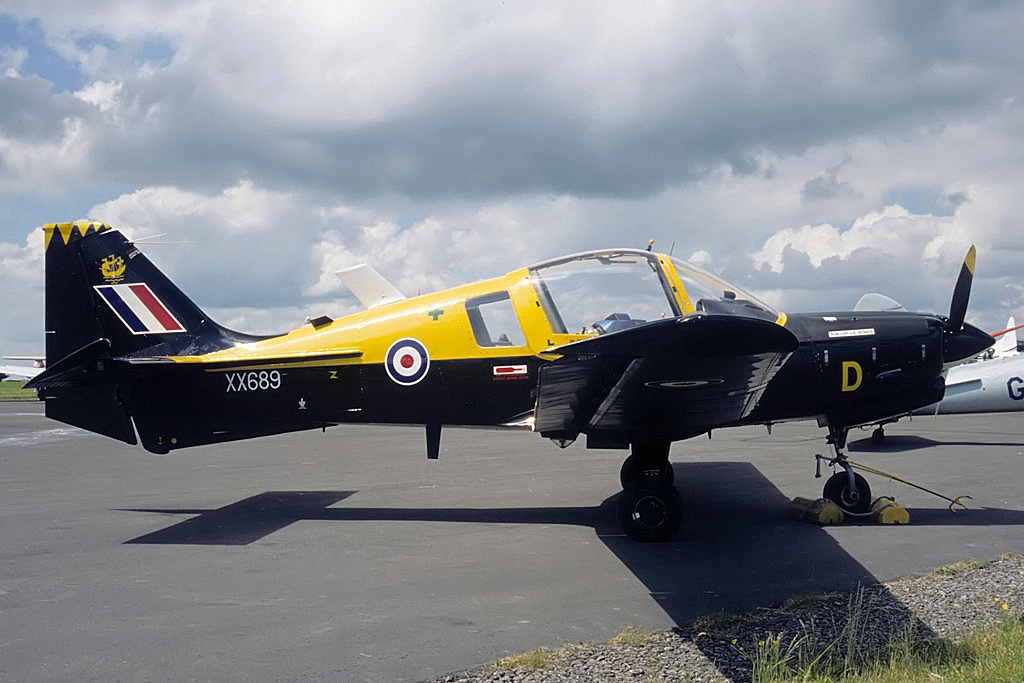
A former BUAS Scottish Aviation Bulldog T1 adorned in Bristol University Air Squadron colours

The squadron has moved multiple times, at first from RAF Filton to RAF Colerne in 1993, and again from RAF Colerne to MOD Boscombe Down following the announcement of Colerne's closure in November 2016. The move to Boscombe Down was completed in 2022, including the relocation of BUAS Town Headquarters to The Artillery Grounds on Whiteladies Road in Bristol; a site it shares with Bristol University Officer Training Corps.

== Incidents ==
- Two aircraft crashed on Tuesday 12 September 1967, both took off from Filton, 'WK610' and 'WP838'; one of the aircraft is still in the nature reserve; with Flt Lt Anthony Funnell, age 39, married with three children, he joined in November 1963, and lived at 16 Belvedere Road, Redland, and Flt Lt Michael Williamson, aged 30

== Alumni ==
- Flt Lt Justin Hughes, from Southport, BSc Physics, Red Arrows 2000 as Red 3, aged 32, Red 5 in 2001, flew the Panavia Tornado at RAF Leuchars with 111 and 43 Sqns

== See also ==
- University Air Squadron units
- University Royal Naval Unit, the Royal Navy equivalent
- Officers Training Corps, the British Army equivalent
- List of Royal Air Force aircraft squadrons
