= No. 666 Squadron AAC =

No. 666 Squadron AAC (V) No. 666 Squadron AAC 666 Aviation Squadron No. 666 (Scottish) Squadron RAuxAF
- Active: 1 May 1949 – 10 March 1957 (RAuxAF); 19 Aug 1969 - 1 April 1978; 1979 – 1 April 2009
- Country: United Kingdom
- Branch: (United Kingdom) British Army
- Part of: 7 Regiment Army Air Corps
- Mottos: Latin: Speculatus ascendimus (Translation: "We ascend to observe")

Insignia
- Squadron Badge heraldry: Badge: In front of two gun barrels in saltire, a lion rampant charged with the Cross of St. Andrew
- Squadron Codes: ROG (May 1949 – April 1951)

Aircraft flown
- Reconnaissance: Auster AOP.6

No. 666 Squadron AAC (V) is a former squadron of the British Army's Army Air Corps (AAC). It was previously No. 666 Squadron RAF, a unit of the Royal Air Force during the Second World War and afterwards became a Royal Auxiliary Air Force (RAuxAF) squadron between 1 May 1949 and 10 March 1957.

No. 666 Squadron RAF was a Royal Air Force air observation post (AOP) squadron associated with the Canadian 1st Army and later part of the Royal Auxiliary Air Force. Numbers 651 to 663 Squadron of the RAF were air observation post units working closely with British Army units in artillery spotting and liaison. A further three of these squadrons, 664–666, were manned with Canadian personnel. Their duties and squadron numbers were transferred to the Army with the formation of the Army Air Corps on 1 September 1957

== History ==
=== Royal Canadian Air Force ===
No. 666 Squadron RCAF was first formed on 5 March 1945 at RAF Andover as an air observation post (AOP) squadron associated with the Canadian 1st Army. After a period working together with the Canadian army and later with the occupation forces in Germany the squadron disbanded on 30 September 1946.

=== Royal Auxiliary Air Force ===
As the number was not transferred to the Canadian authorities, it was revived post-war when the squadron was reformed as No. 666 (Scottish) Squadron RAuxAF, part of the RAuxAF on 1 May 1949 at Scone. Equipped with Auster AOP.6 aircraft, the squadron's headquarters was located at RAF Perth/Scone, with three detached flights, Nos. 1966, 1967 and 1968 Reserve AOP Flight RAF at respectively RAF Perth/Scone, RAF Renfrew (later RAF Abbotsinch) and RAF Turnhouse, before it was disbanded on 10 March 1957 by transferring to the Army Air Corps.

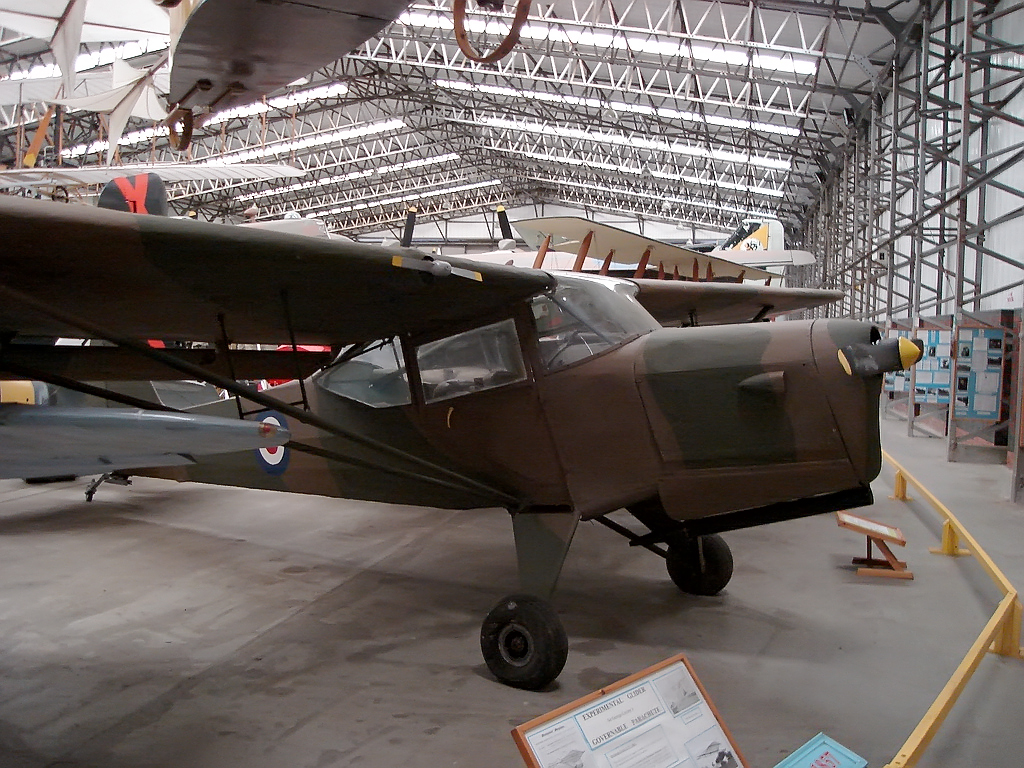
A preserved Auster AOP.6 at the Yorkshire Air Museum.

Aircraft operated by No. 666 Squadron RAuxAF
From	To	Aircraft	Version
June 1949	November 1951	Taylorcraft Auster	V
June 1949	February 1957	Auster	AOP.6

Bases and airfields used by No. 666 Squadron RAuxAF
From	To	Base	Remark
1 May 1949	10 March 1957	RAF Perth/Scone, Perth and Kinross, Scotland	No. 1966 Reserve AOP Flight RAuxAF
1 May 1949	10 March 1957	RAF Turnhouse, Edinburgh, Scotland	No. 1968 Reserve AOP Flight RAuxAF
1 December 1951	5 December 1952	RAF Renfrew, Renfrewshire, Scotland	No. 1967 Reserve AOP Flight RAuxAF
5 December 1952	10 March 1957	RAF Abbotsinch, Renfrewshire, Scotland	

=== Army Air Corps ===
666 Aviation Squadron was formed on 19 August 1969 at Coypool, Plymouth within 3 Division Aviation Regiment, Army Air Corps. On 1 January 1973, 3 Division Aviation Regiment was renamed to 3 Regiment Army Air Corps and 666 Aviation Squadron AAC became 666 Squadron AAC. On 1 January 1973 the squadron moved to Alanbrooke Barracks, Topcliffe to support 24th Airportable Brigade, however on 1 April 1978 the squadron was disbanded and became No. 655 Squadron AAC.

666 Squadron was reformed as 666 Squadron AAC (V) during 1979 at Airfield Camp, Netheravon within 7 Regiment Army Air Corps (V) operating Westland Gazelle AH.1's.

666 Squadron AAC (V) was reformed on 26 April 1986 at Netheravon with the Scout AH.1.

The squadron was disbanded on 1 April 2009, still at Netheravon.

== Fictional service ==
A fictional 666 Squadron featured in the Air Ace Picture Library story The Bomber Barons. This 666 Squadron was a bomber unit founded at the outbreak of World War II, operating Handley Page Hampdens (September 1939 – December 1940), Avro Manchesters (January 1941 – 1942), Avro Lancasters (1942–1944) and Avro Vulcans (1960s – 1982). In the long-running series of 'Biggles' books by W. E. Johns, 666 Squadron, RAF, is the Special Duties squadron led by the eponymous hero James Bigglesworth during World War II. In the Charles Stross novel "The Fuller Memorandum" 666 Squadron is a secret RAF unit involved on occult activities.

== See also ==
- List of Army Air Corps aircraft units (United Kingdom)
- List of Royal Air Force aircraft squadrons
