= No. 50 Group RAF =

Former Royal Air Force operations group

No. 50 (Training) Group RAF
- Royal Air Force Ensign
- Active: 1 February 1939 – 31 May 1947
- Country: United Kingdom
- Branch: Royal Air Force
- Type: Royal Air Force group
- Part of: RAF Reserve Command; RAF Flying Training Command

No. 50 Group RAF is a former Royal Air Force Training group that was operational from 1 February 1939, throughout the Second World War until 31 May 1947 within RAF Reserve Command.

== Structure ==
November 1939 – HQ at Bristol

- RAF Fairoaks = No. 18 Elementary Flying Training School RAF
- RAF Filton = No. 2 Elementary Flying Training School RAF
- RAF Staverton = No. 6 Air Observer & Navigator School RAF
- RAF Hamble = No. 3 Elementary Flying Training School RAF & No. 11 Air Observer & Navigator School RAF
- London Air Park (Hanworth) = No. 5 Elementary Flying Training School RAF
- RAF Hatfield = No. 1 Elementary Flying Training School RAF
- RAF Woodley (Reading) = No. 8 Elementary Flying Training School RAF
- RAF Redhill = No. 15 Elementary Flying Training School RAF
- RAF Weston-super-Mare = No. 5 Air Observer & Navigator School RAF
- RAF White Waltham = No. 13 Elementary Flying Training School RAF
- RAF Yatesbury = No. 10 Elementary Flying Training School RAF & No. 2 Air Observer & Navigator School RAF

== No. 51 (Training) Group RAF ==
No. 51 (Training) Group RAF was formed on 11 May 1939 in Reserve Command at RAF Hendon controlling Elementary and Reserve Flying Training Schools. On 27 May 1940 it was moved to RAF Flying Training Command. It was disbanded on 14 July 1945 and absorbed into No. 50 Group RAF.

November 1939 – HQ at Leeds

- RAF Ansty = No. 9 Elementary Flying Training School RAF & No. 4 Air Observer & Navigator School RAF
- RAF Sydenham (Belfast Harbour) = No. 24 Elementary Flying Training School RAF
- RAF Squires Gate (Blackpool) = No. 9 Air Observer & Navigator School RAF
- Brough Aerodrome = No. 4 Elementary Flying Training School RAF
- RAF Cambridge = No. 22 Elementary Flying Training School RAF
- RAF Carlisle = No. 3 Air Observer & Navigator School RAF
- RAF Burnaston (Derby) = No. 30 Elementary Flying Training School RAF
- RAF Desford = No. 7 Elementary Flying Training School RAF
- RAF Elmdon = No. 14 Elementary Flying Training School RAF
- RAF Perth = No. 11 Elementary Flying Training School RAF & No. 7 Air Observer & Navigator School RAF
- RAF Prestwick = No. 12 Elementary Flying Training School RAF & No. 1 Air Observer & Navigator School RAF
- RAF Sywell = No. 6 Elementary Flying Training School RAF
