= RAF Home Command =

Former command of the Royal Air Force

Home Command
- RAF Home Command badge
- Active: 1 February 1939–27 May 1940; 1 May 1946–1 April 1959
- Country: United Kingdom
- Branch: Royal Air Force
- Garrison/HQ: Wantage Hall, University of Reading
- Motto(s): Support

RAF Home Command was the Royal Air Force command that was responsible for the maintenance and training of reserve organisations from formation on 1 February 1939 as RAF Reserve Command with interruptions until it ceased to exist on 1 April 1959.

== History ==
The Command was formed as RAF Reserve Command on 1 February 1939. It was absorbed into RAF Flying Training Command on 27 May 1940 but reformed again on 1 May 1946. It was then renamed RAF Home Command on 1 August 1950 and absorbed into RAF Flying Training Command again on 1 April 1959.

The command's communications squadron, the Home Command Communication Squadron, was formed on 1 August 1950 at RAF White Waltham and disestablished on 1 April 1959, still at White Waltham, becoming the Flying Training Command Communication Squadron RAF.

The command operated a number of units:

- Home Command Examining Unit (1950–51 & 1951–59)
- No. 1 Home Command Gliding Centre (1955–59)
- No. 2 Home Command Gliding Centre (1958–59)
- Home Command Gliding Instructors School (1950–55)
- Home Command Instrument Training Flight (1950–52)
- Home Command Major Servicing Unit (1950–54)
- Home Command Modified Officer Cadet Training Unit (1953–56)
- Home Command Training Flight (1950)

== Groups of Home Command ==
RAF group	dates active	notes
No. 61 Group RAF	1940; 1946–1959	No. 61 Group was first formed on 1 July 1940 in Northern Ireland, and was raised to command status and renamed RAF in Northern Ireland on 1 August 1940. Reformed as No. 61 (Eastern Reserve) Group on 2 May 1946 within Reserve Command, it was renamed No. 61 (Eastern) Group on 1 August 1950 and transferred to Home Command. It was renamed No. 61 (Southern Reserve) Group on 1 January 1957, and disbanded 31 May 1959.
No. 62 Group RAF	1946–1957	No. 62 (Southern Reserve) Group was formed on 15 May 1946 within Reserve Command, and renamed No. 62 (Southern) Group on 1 August 1950 when transferred to Home Command. It was absorbed into 61 Group on 1 January 1957.
No. 63 Group RAF	1946–1957	No. 63 (Western & Welsh Reserve) Group was formed on 2 May 1946 within Reserve Command, and renamed No. 63 (Western & Welsh) Group on 1 August 1950 when transferred to Home Command. It disbanded on 1 February 1957.
No. 64 Group RAF	1946–1958/59	No. 64 (Northern Reserve) Group was formed on 2 May 1946 within Reserve Command, and was renamed No. 64 (Northern) Group on 1 August 1950 when transferred to Home Command. It disbanded in 1958 or 1959.
No. 65 Group RAF	1946–1950/51	No. 65 (London Reserve) Group was formed on 2 May 1946 within Reserve Command, and renamed No. 65 (London) Group on 1 August 1950 when transferred to Home Command. It disbanded in 1950 or 1951.
No. 66 Group RAF	1946–1956/57	No. 66 (Scottish Reserve) Group was formed on 2 May 1946 within Reserve Command and renamed No. 66 (Scottish) Group on 1 August 1950 when transferred to Home Command. It disbanded in 1956 or 1957.
No. 67 Group RAF	1950–1957	No. 67 (Northern Ireland Reserve) Group was formed on 31 March 1950 from RAF in Northern Ireland. It was renamed No. 67 (Northern Ireland) Group on 1 August 1950 when transferred to Home Command. It disbanded on 28 February 1957.

== Air Officer Commanding-in-Chief ==
Air Officer Commanding-in-Chief included:
RAF Reserve Command

- 1 February 1939 Air Marshal Sir Christopher Courtney
- 28 August 1939 Air Chief Marshal Sir John Steel
- 22 April 1940 Air Vice Marshal Sir William Welsh

Note: The Command was not in existence from May 1940 to May 1946

- 1 May 1946 Air Commodore E D H Davies (Temporary)
- 20 May 1946 Air Marshal Sir Alan Lees
- 1 October 1949 Air Marshal Sir Robert Foster

RAF Home Command

- 1 August 1950 Air Marshal Sir Robert Foster
- 31 Mar 1952 Air Marshal Sir Ronald Ivelaw-Chapman
- 1 October 1952 Air Marshal Sir Harold Lydford
- March 1956 Air Marshal Sir Douglas Macfadyen

== See also ==
- List of Royal Air Force commands
