= List of anti-aircraft cooperation units of the Royal Air Force =

This is a List of Anti-aircraft co-operation units of the Royal Air Force.

== Anti-Aircraft Co-operation Units ==
Unit	Formed on	Formed at	Disbanded on	Disbanded at	Notes
Anti-Aircraft Co-operation Flight	22 October 1931	Biggin Hill	14 April 1936	Biggin Hill	Previously the Night Flying Flight
Anti-Aircraft Co-operation Unit	14 April 1936	Biggin Hill	10 February 1937	Biggin Hill	Previously the Anti-Aircraft Co-operation Flight
No. 1 Anti-Aircraft Co-operation Unit	10 February 1937	Biggin Hill	1 October 1942	Farnborough	Previously the Anti-Aircraft Co-operation Unit
'A' Flight, 1 AACU then 'A1' Flight, 1 AACU	10 February 1937	Biggin Hill	1 November 1942	Weston Zoyland	Previously 'A' Flight, AACU
'B' Flight, 1 AACU then 'B1' Flight, 1 AACU	10 February 1937	Bircham Newton	1 November 1942	Carew Cheriton	Previously 'B' Flight, AACU
'C' Flight, 1 AACU then 'C1' Flight, 1 AACU	15 March 1937	Biggin Hill	1 November 1942	Towyn	
'D' Flight, 1 AACU then 'D1' Flight, 1 AACU	16 September 1937	Biggin Hill	1 November 1942	Cleave	Previously No. 1 Queen Bee Flight
'E' Flight, 1 AACU then 'E1' Flight, 1 AACU	11 April 1938	Farnborough	1 October 1942	West Freugh	
'F' Flight, 1 AACU then 'F1' Flight, 1 AACU	28 April 1938	Farnborough	1 November 1942	Cark	
'G' Flight, 1 AACU then 'G1' Flight, 1 AACU	1 May 1939	Usworth	1 November 1942	Cleave	
'H' Flight, 1 AACU	1 April 1939	Biggin Hill	1 July 1941	Christchurch	
'H1' Flight, 1 AACU	1 January 1942	Farnbrough	1 November 1942	Martlesham Heath	
'J' Flight, 1 AACU then 'J1' Flight, 1 AACU	1 December 1939	Farnborough	1 November 1942	Bodorgan	
'K' Flight, 1 AACU then 'K1' Flight, 1 AACU	December 1939	Farnborough	1 November 1942	Langham	
'L' Flight, 1 AACU then 'L1' Flight, 1 AACU	26 March 1940	Farnborough	1 November 1942	Aberporth	
'M' Flight, 1 AACU then 'M1' Flight, 1 AACU	27 September 1940	Bircham Newton	1 November 1942	Langham	
'N' Flight, 1 AACU then 'N1' Flight, 1 AACU	13 January 1942	Thornaby	1 November 1942	West Hartlepool	
'O' Flight, 1 AACU then 'O1' Flight, 1 AACU	5 November 1940	Cleave	1 November 1942	Cleave	
'P' Flight, 1 AACU then 'P1' Flight, 1 AACU	25 August 1941	Weston Zoyland	1 November 1942	Weston Zoyland	
'Q' Flight, 1 AACU then 'Q1' Flight, 1 AACU	30 June 1941	Aberporth	1 November 1942	Aberporth	
'R' Flight, 1 AACU then 'R1' Flight, 1 AACU	30 June 1941	Farnborough	1 October 1942	Cark	
'S' Flight, 1 AACU	26 January 1942	Newtownards	1 November 1942	Newtownards	
'T' Flight, 1 AACU	21 January 1941	Farnborough	29 April 1942	Weybourne	
'U' Flight, 1 AACU	15 August 1940	St Athan	30 October 1942	Morfa Towyn	
'V' Flight, 1 AACU	14 May 1939	Cleave	1 November 1942	Cleave	
'W' Flight, 1 AACU	16 May 1939	Henlow	18 April 1942	Kidsdale	
'X' Flight, 1 AACU	15 May 1939	Henlow	1 November 1942	Aberporth	Flying DH Queen Bee target drones from Weybourne from June 1939
'Y' Flight, 1 AACU	11 April 1938	Henlow	16 August 1942	Manorbier	
'Z' Flight, 1 AACU	11 April 1938	Watchet	1 November 1942	Bodorgan	Previously 'D' Flight, 1 AACU
No. 2 Anti-Aircraft Co-operation Unit	15 February 1937	Lee-on-Solent	14 February 1943	Unk	
'A' Flight, 2 AACU	Unk	Unk	14 February 1943	Gosport	
'C' Flight, 2 AACU	Unk	Unk	14 February 1943	Roborough	
'D' Flight, 2 AACU	Unk	Unk	14 February 1943	Detling	
Co-operation Flight, Mount Batten, 2 AACU	Unk	Unk	Unk	Unk	
No. 3 Anti-Aircraft Co-operation Unit	1 March 1937	Kalafrana, Malta	19 September 1940	Kalafrana	Became 830 Naval Air Squadron and No. 431 (General Reconnaissance) Flight RAF
No. 4 Anti-Aircraft Co-operation Unit	1 August 1938	Seletar, Singapore	28 March 1942	Mingaladon, Burma	
No. 5 Anti-Aircraft Co-operation Unit	6 May 1940	Ringway	August 1940	Perth	
No. 6 Anti-Aircraft Co-operation Unit	1 March 1940	Ringway	1 December 1943	Castle Bromwich	Merged with No. 7 and No. 8 AACU's to become No. 577 Squadron RAF
No. 7 Anti-Aircraft Co-operation Unit	26 March 1940	Ringway	1 December 1943	Castle Bromwich	Merged with No. 6 and No. 8 AACU's to become No. 577 Squadron RAF
No. 8 Anti-Aircraft Co-operation Unit	16 April 1940	Ringway	1 December 1943	Pengham Moors	Merged with No. 6 and No. 7 AACU's to become No. 577 Squadron RAF
No. 9 Anti-Aircraft Co-operation Unit	15 April 1940	Ringway	Unk	Woodley	
No. 21 Anti-Aircraft Co-operation Unit	December 1942	Takoradi, Gold Coast	10 May 1945	Robertsfield, Liberia	
No. 22 Anti-Aircraft Co-operation Unit	3 December 1942	Drigh Road, India	1 April 1947	Santa Cruz, India	
'HQ' Flight, 22 AACU	Unk	Unk	1 April 1947	Santa Cruz, India	
'A' Flight, 22 AACU	Unk	Unk	1 April 1947	Drigh Road, India	
'B' Flight, 22 AACU	Unk	Unk	1 April 1947	Poona, India	
No. 23 Anti-Aircraft Co-operation Unit	1 August 1943	Habbaniya, Iraq	15 March 1946	Ciampino, Italy	
No. 25 Anti-Aircraft Co-operation Unit	15 January 1943	UK	5 November 1945	Eastleigh, Kenya	
No. 26 Anti-Aircraft Co-operation Unit	November 1942	El Firdan, Egypt	31 March 1947	Aqir, Palestine	
No. 1 Civilian Anti-Aircraft Co-operation Unit	7 December 1950	RAF Hornchurch	31 December 1956	RAF Hornchurch	
No. 2 Civilian Anti-Aircraft Co-operation Unit	20 July 1951	RAF Little Snoring	1 November 1958	RAF Langham	
No. 3 Civilian Anti-Aircraft Co-operation Unit	18 March 1951	RAF Exeter	1 July 1954	RAF Exeter	
No. 3/4 Civilian Anti-Aircraft Co-operation Unit	1 July 1954	RAF Exeter	31 December 1971	RAF Exeter	
No. 4 Civilian Anti-Aircraft Co-operation Unit	1 August 1951	RAF Llandow	1 July 1954	RAF Llandow	
No. 5 Civilian Anti-Aircraft Co-operation Unit	16 September 1951	RAF Llanbedr	30 September 1971	RAF Woodvale	

- Anti-Aircraft Co-operation Flight RAF (1931–36) became Anti-Aircraft Co-operation Unit RAF
- Anti-Aircraft Co-operation Flight, Indian Air Force Volunteer Reserve (1941–42) became No. 1 Anti-Aircraft Co-operation Flight, Indian Air Force Volunteer Reserve
- No. 1 Anti-Aircraft Co-operation Flight, Indian Air Force Volunteer Reserve (1942) became No. 1 Anti-Aircraft Co-operation Unit, Indian Air Force
- No. 2 Anti-Aircraft Co-operation Flight, Indian Air Force Volunteer Reserve (1942) became No. 2 Anti-Aircraft Co-operation Unit, Indian Air Force
- No. 3 Anti-Aircraft Co-operation Flight, Indian Air Force Volunteer Reserve (1942) became No. 3 Anti-Aircraft Co-operation Unit, Indian Air Force
