= Cyril Cooke =

Royal Air Force Air Marshal (1895-1972)

Sir Cyril Cooke
- Born: 28 June 1895
- Died: 27 September 1972 (aged 77)
- Relatives: Air Vice Marshal John Cooke (son)
- Military career
- Allegiance: United Kingdom
- Branch: British Army (1914–1918); Royal Air Force (1918–1949)
- Service years: 1914–1949
- Rank: Air marshal
- Commands: Maintenance Command (1947–1949); No. 43 Group (1945–1946); No. 4 School of Technical Training (1942–44); No. 206 (Maintenance) Group (1941–1942); No. 6 School of Technical Training (1939–1940); No. 20 Squadron (1924–1925); No. 188 Squadron (1918–1919)
- Conflicts: First World War; Second World War
- Awards: Knight Commander of the Order of the Bath; Commander of the Order of the British Empire; Mentioned in dispatches (2)

Air Marshal Sir Cyril Bertram Cooke, KCB, CBE (28 June 1895 – 27 September 1972) was a senior Royal Air Force officer who served as Air Officer Commanding-in-Chief RAF Maintenance Command from 1947 to 1949.

== Military career ==
Cooke served with the Royal Artillery during the First World War, transferring to the Royal Flying Corps in 1915. He was appointed Officer Commanding No. 188 Squadron in April 1918 on the formation of the Royal Air Force. He went on to be Officer Commanding No. 20 Squadron in 1924, a wing commander at the No. 1 School of Technical Training in 1935 and Officer Commanding, No. 6 School of Technical Training in 1939.

He served in the Second World War as Chief Maintenance Officer at Headquarters RAF Middle East from February 1941, as Air Officer Commanding No. 206 (Maintenance) Group from June 1941 and as Air Officer Commanding No. 4 School of Technical Training from December 1942 before becoming Director of Technical Training at the Air Ministry in June 1944 and Director of Maintenance and Supply at Rear Headquarters Mediterranean Allied Air Forces in December 1944. He finished the war as Air Officer Commanding No. 43 Group.

After the war he was appointed Director-General of Servicing and Maintenance at the Air Ministry and then Air Officer Commanding-in-Chief Maintenance Command before retiring in 1949.

== Personal life ==
He took part in the National Shooting Competition at Bisley and was Chairman of the Royal Air Force (County) Football Association.

He was the father of John Cooke. His son also joined the RAF and rose to senior ranks as Dean of Air Force Medicine.

Military offices
Preceded by Sir Grahame Donald	Air Officer Commanding-in-Chief Maintenance Command; 1947–1949	Succeeded by Sir Thomas Warne-Browne
