= Thomas Warne-Browne =

Royal Air Force Air Marshal (1898-1962)

Sir Thomas Warne-Browne
- Born: 21 June 1898
- Died: 13 October 1962 (aged 64)
- Military career
- Allegiance: United Kingdom
- Branch: Royal Navy (1917–1918); Royal Air Force (1918–1953)
- Service years: 1917–1953
- Rank: Air marshal
- Commands: Maintenance Command (1949–1952); No. 43 Group (1946); No. 22 Squadron (1934–1935); No. 811 Squadron (1933–1934)
- Conflicts: First World War; Second World War
- Awards: Knight Commander of the Order of the British Empire; Companion of the Order of the Bath; Distinguished Service Cross

Air Marshal Sir Thomas Arthur Warne-Browne, KBE, CB, DSC (21 July 1898 – 13 October 1962), was a senior Royal Air Force officer who served as Air Officer Commanding-in-Chief Maintenance Command from 1949 to 1952.

== RAF career ==
Warne-Browne served with the Royal Naval Air Service and Royal Air Force in the First World War being awarded the Distinguished Service Cross for a reconnaissance over Bruges and Blankenberge under heavy anti-aircraft fire in March 1918. He was appointed Officer Commanding No. 22 Squadron in 1934 and a Squadron Commander at No. 1 Flying Training School in 1936. Later that year he became Senior Engineering Officer at RAF Gosport. He also served in the Second World War as Senior Engineer Staff Officer at Headquarters RAF Coastal Command from 1942 until the end of the war. After the War he became Air Officer Commanding No. 43 Group and then joined the Senior Technical Staff Officer at RAF Mediterranean and Middle East in 1947 before becoming Air Officer Commanding-in-Chief at RAF Maintenance Command in 1949 and retiring in 1953.

He lived at Chilbolton near Stockbridge in Hampshire.

Military offices
Preceded by Sir Cyril Cooke	Air Officer Commanding-in-Chief Maintenance Command; 1949–1952	Succeeded by Sir Leslie Harvey
