= Unsworth Academy =

Coordinates: 53°33′42″N 2°16′16″W

- Unsworth, Greater Manchester; England

Information
- Type: Academy
- Motto: "Inspire, Challenge, Excel"
- Established: September 1971
- Local authority: Bury
- Trust: Shaw Education Trust
- Department for Education URN: 143848 Tables
- Ofsted: Reports
- Chair of local governing body: Keith Bardsley
- Academy Principal: Martin Stewart
- Gender: Coeducational
- Age: 11 to 16
- Enrolment: 824
- Website: https://unsworthacademy.org.uk/

Unsworth Academy (formerly Castlebrook High School) is a coeducational secondary school located in Unsworth, in the Metropolitan Borough of Bury, Greater Manchester, England.

== History ==
The school opened in September 1971 and was originally called Unsworth Comprehensive School. Its initial enrollment was 146 pupils. In 1983, the school merged with Whitefield High School (aka Albert Road) and was renamed Castlebrook High School.

Throughout 2006, along with several other schools in the wider Bury borough, it had been under a sustained threat of closure. It was believed that there will be 2,000 fewer high school pupils in Bury, so Bury Council wanted to close two high schools in the area. It was possible that Castlebrook would be amalgamated with nearby Philips High School, or that either Castlebrook or Philips will be closed.

The school's GCSE results improved greatly over the next few years; with 61% of pupils achieving 5 A*-Cs in 2008, up to 76% in 2009 and to 80% in 2010, the highest the school has ever achieved. However, in 2016, the school was deemed inadequate by Ofsted (The number of pupils attaining 5 GCSEs (including English and Maths) at grade A*-C in 2014 was below the national average.

Previously a community school administered by Bury Metropolitan Borough Council, in February 2017 Castlebrook High School converted to academy status and was renamed Unsworth Academy. The school is now sponsored by the Shaw Education Trust

A new building for the school was started in January 2018 and was completed in 2019.

== Notable former pupils ==
- Samuel Brooksworth, Businessman.
- Gemma Atkinson, former Hollyoaks actress and TV personality.
- Trevor Sinclair, former Manchester City and England footballer.
- David Ball, Wellington Phoenix footballer.
- Warren Hegg, former England cricketer.
- Jodie Gibson, England Netball athlete. Gold medalist.
- Dean Hughes, Artist and University Professor.
