= Unsworth Cricket Club =

Unsworth Cricket Club are an English cricket team based in Unsworth, in the Metropolitan Borough of Bury, currently playing in the Greater Manchester League.

== Introduction ==
Unsworth
League	Central Lancashire League
Ground	Pole Lane, Unsworth, Bury, Greater Manchester
Professional	Jonathan Fowler (South Africa)
Overseas Amateur	Not yet arrived
CLL History	Joined circa 1988

The ground is situated at the end of Pole Lane which leads down from the centre of Unsworth Village. It is bordered by the M66 but there is no exit from this. This is the new ground of Unsworth CC built in 2002–2003 after the sale of the old pitch to a property developer. The new ground is much larger and it is possible to extend the boundaries to Test playing size. the club have already played host to two separate Lancashire 2nd XI games with another planned for this year. The low-rise pavilion hosts a function room with capacity for 120 and a members' bar.

== Teams ==
Unsworth Cricket Club fields 1st and 2nd XI teams in the Greater Manchester League, Divisions 4 and 6 (North & West) respectively, having been members of the Central Lancashire League (see below) as well as U15, U13 and U11 junior sides. The U-17s used to play in the Lancashire County League.

== Honours ==
Major honours in recent times have seen the 1st XI finish 2nd in the league in 2004.
