= Unsworth =

Area of Greater Manchester, England

Coordinates: 53.5574°N 2.2801°W

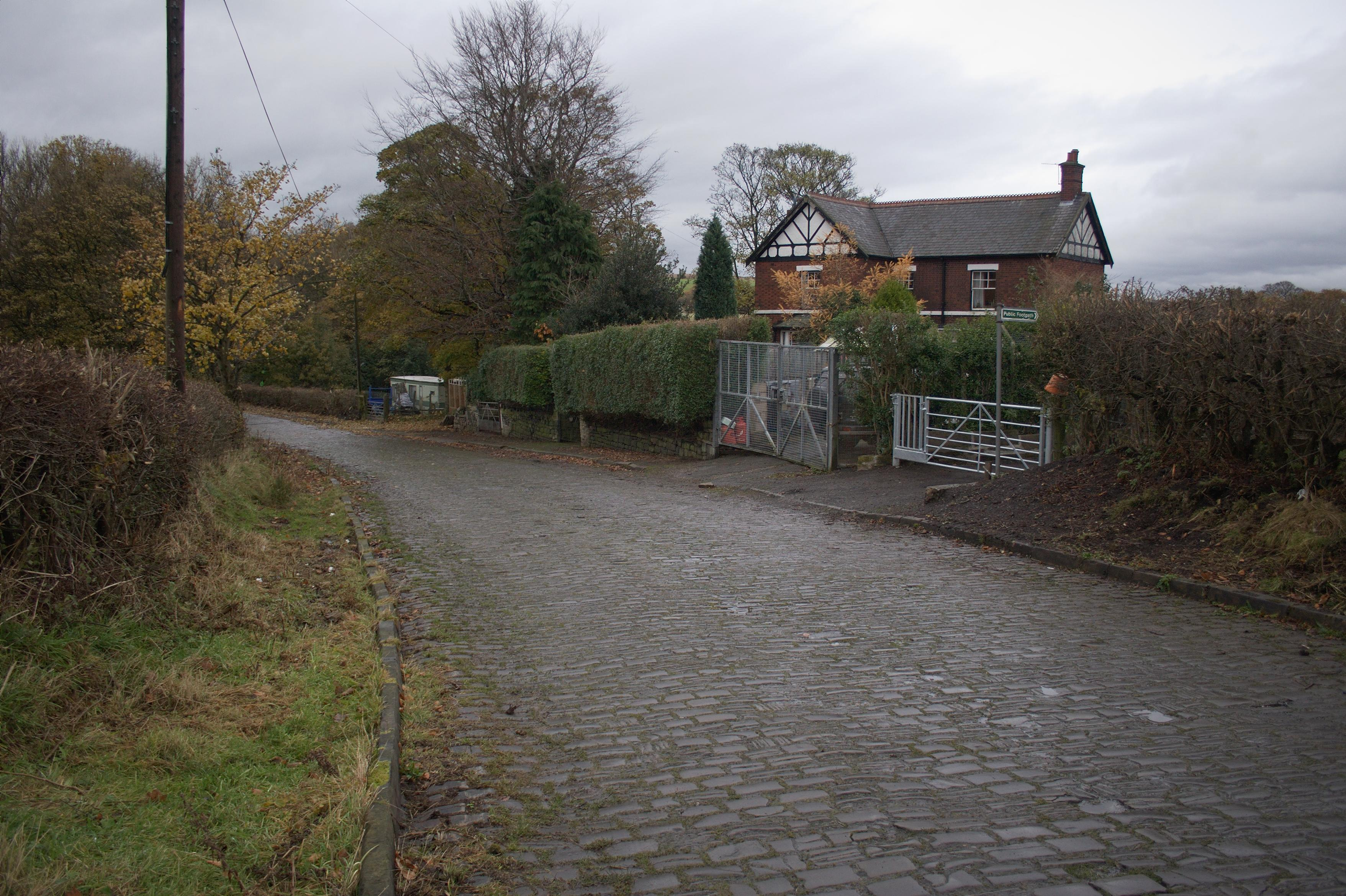
- Castle Lane on the outskirts of Unsworth

- Location within Greater Manchester
- Population: 11,034 (2021)
- Metropolitan borough: Bury
- Metropolitan county: Greater Manchester
- Region: North West
- Country: England
- Sovereign state: United Kingdom
- Post town: Bury
- Postcode district: BL9
- Dialling code: 0161
- Police: Greater Manchester
- Fire: Greater Manchester
- Ambulance: North West
- UK Parliament: Bury South

Unsworth is a settlement in the Bury district, in Greater Manchester, England. The population of Unsworth Ward, as of the 2021 census is 11,034. The village sits approximately 7 miles (11 km) north of the city of Manchester and 4 miles (6.4 km) south of the town of Bury, and contains the area of Hollins, and part of Sunny Bank.

Historically a part of Lancashire, Unsworth has been recorded as far back as the 13th century. Its name is thought to derive from the Old English word “hound,” literally meaning “place of the hounds.” Unsworth's development as a village mostly took place during and after the Industrial Revolution, when due to its nearby waterways, it became involved in the manufacturing of dye and bleach. The mid-20th century onwards saw major changes in the village. The construction of Sunny Bank Road, and the M66 motorway which both cut through the village significantly shifted its character, with its western side becoming suburbanised, while leaving its eastern side largely agricultural.

== History ==
=== Toponymy ===
The name of Unsworth derives from Old English. It is made up of two parts: hund, relating either the modern English hound, or a personal name; and worth, a common Old English suffix which typically refers to either an enclosure, or to a protected place. Thus, the name essentially means "enclosure of somebody named Hund", or "place of the hounds".

On 10 June 1291 Edward I granted hunting rights to the Pilkington family over Unsworth and the surrounding areas, suggesting that the enclosure of the hounds might refer to the place where hunting dogs were historically kept. Moreover, the name of nearby Stand Hall (part of the same historical estate as Unsworth) may have referred to the hunting stand from which the estate could be surveyed for game, indicating ties between Unsworth's name, and medieval hunting in the area.

The name was first recorded in 1291 as Hundeswrth, then as Undesworth in 1322. The historical loss of the "h" sound in the names of villages is a typical feature of Lancashire place names, caused by an elision typical of Lancashire dialects.

=== Early history ===
Evidence of human activity in the area dates back to prehistory. An earthworks identified at Castle Brook Farm in the eastern part of Unsworth, may be indicative of a prehistoric camp situated on a well-drained spur above Castle Brook. The feature includes a vaguely oval cropmark and a sub-circular feature thought to be a possible backfilled pond. Furthermore, the environment assessment noted that preserved organic palaeoenvironmental remains may be present within the peat deposits of Unsworth Moss, though a 1990s archaeological watching brief at Back o' th' Moss Farm to the north revealed no sites of interest.

Later archaeological investigations indicate the presence of a medieval settlement. A 1984 investigation suggested that there may have been an iron smelting site on Unsworth Moss, by the banks of Whittle Brook. While not conclusive, it explored the possibility of a body of regional significance, specifically a medieval bloomery that used the brook as a water source. In 1997, a field walking project reiterated the suggestion of a medieval site at Meadow Croft Fold, and a 2021 report by the Greater Manchester Combined Authority noted that the site may be of regional importance, recommending an extensive survey before scheduling could be considered.

Following the Norman conquest in 1066, Unsworth became part of the Pilkington family estate, later passing into the hands of the Earls of Derby in the 15th century. It historically comprised part of the historic county of Lancashire, situated within the Salford Hundred subdivision. By the time of the hearth tax collection in 1666, Unsworth was recorded as having 40 hearths, with no individual house containing six.

=== Industrial history ===
Unsworth and its waterways provided power and resources for local industries such as bleach and dye works, while local clay was utilised for brickworks. By the mid-19th century, the village had grown into a distinct industrial hub. In 1850 Unsworth had its own Post Receiving House and a growing local textile industry including Victoria Mill and Unsworth Mill. By 1891 Victoria Mill was operating 220 power looms at the site, producing ticking, nankeens, linen and drills, alongside the Unsworth Finishing Company. Industrial and commercial activity also extended to the village's western boundary at Blackford Bridge, which by 1850 supported a blacksmith and farrier, a calico printer, two provision dealers, and the Bridge Inn.

In September 1866, an outdoor meeting was held at Unsworth Pole, organised by the local Footpath and Well Preservation Association, to protest the closure of a centuries-old community well by the Earl of Derby's estate agent, Mr. Statter. The dispute arose during a period of heightened cholera anxiety, with speakers noting that villagers were left with access only to contaminated muddy water. Tensions escalated when residents physically re-opened the well, 38 separate times, only for estate workers to repeatedly fill it back in until Mr. Statter's men retaliated by filling the water source with common midden manure. The Earl of Derby was serving as the chairman of the Sanitary Commission of England at the time.

=== 20th century onwards ===
The first major change in the 20th century was the construction of the Royal Air Force's logistics base during the Second World War. Established in 1938 as No. 35 Maintenance Unit, it served as a major logistics and equipment depot. While the headquarters was located in Heywood, the facility was large and dispersed, covering an area of over 15 miles. The western perimeter of the military site extended over Unsworth's eastern boundary along Moss Hall Road.

During the war, the Unsworth section of the base housed a prisoner-of-war camp. The camp accommodated approximately 100 Italian prisoners, primarily soldiers captured during the Allied invasion of Sicily, who were assigned to work at the logistics depot. The prisoners remained at the camp until their repatriation in April 1946. The RAF maintenance unit officially closed in the late 1960s, parts of which remained in use in the early 1980s by shipping firms and other industries.

Unsworth was affected significantly by the construction of the M66 motorway. The road between junctions 3 and 4 passes behind Unsworth Pole and through Back o' th' Moss Farm. Construction of the motorway, along with urbanisation in the mid-1970s reduced the dairy farm's acreage from 300 to 150 acres, resulted in a loss of the dairy production and lower yields of "hay, corn, barley and potatoes"

== Governance ==
Unsworth was a chapelry the eastern portion of the township of Pilkington in the parish of Prestwich in the hundred of Salford and county of Lancashire in Northern England. On 31 December 1894 Unsworth became a separate civil parish, being formed from Pilkington, Pilsworth and Heap, on 1 October 1933 the parish was abolished and merged with Bury. In 1931 the parish had a population of 2461.

Historically in Lancashire, the village, with the passage of the Local Government Act 1972, became part of the Metropolitan Borough of Bury on 1 April 1974. On the borough council it is a marginal Labour/Conservative ward that has tended to vote Labour. From 1983 to 2010 it was in the parliamentary constituency of Bury North, before being transferred to the Bury South constituency in 2010, currently held by the Labour MP Christian Wakeford since 2019.

== Geography ==
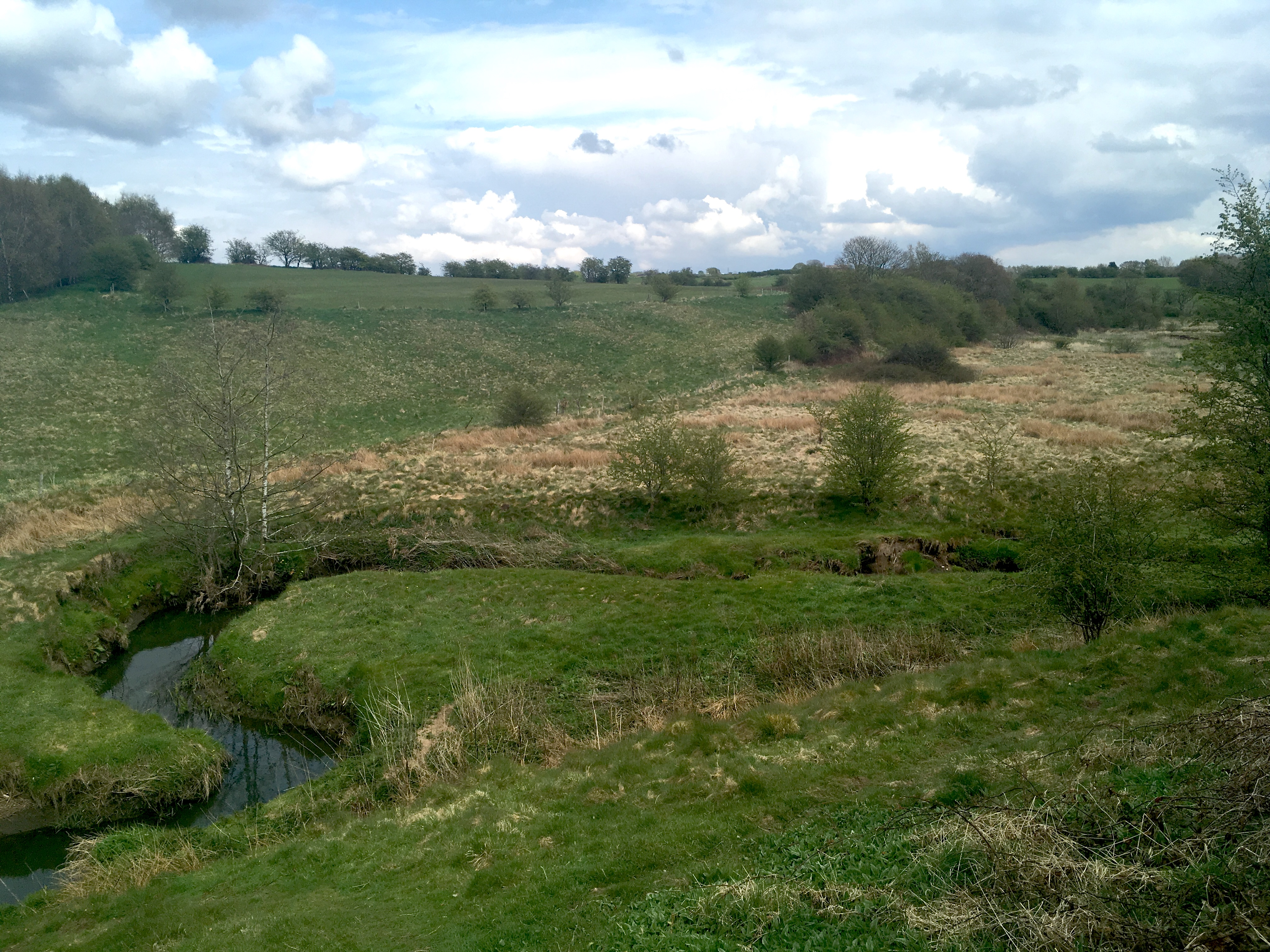
Whittle Brook and the outskirts of Hollins Vale Nature Reserve

Unsworth lies on high ground between two brooks running north to Whittle Brook and the River Roch, covering 972 acres of mostly arable land that was boggy until drainage was installed. Parr Brook joins the River Roch at Blackford Bridge.

The village and surrounding area were urbanised in the 1960s. Transformation began in the 1950s with the construction of housing and the road known as Sunny Bank Road connecting the old village to the A56 arterial road between Bury and Manchester. The resulting Sunny Bank area has been identified by landscape historians as a rare local example of a mid-to-late 20th-century suburban commercial core, characterised by parades of shops with integrated car parking.

=== Hollins Vale ===
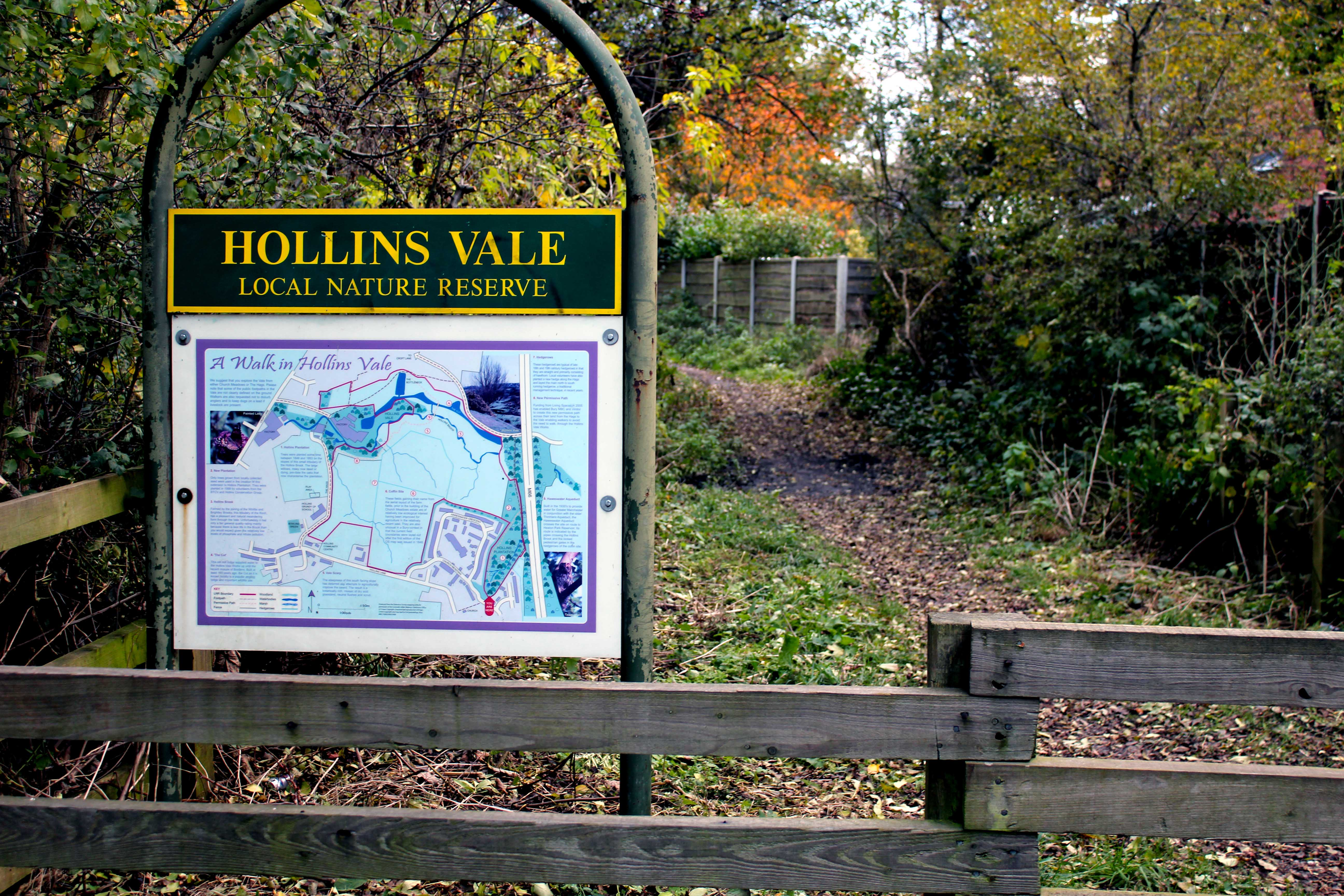
Hollins Vale, a Local Nature Reserve located in Unsworth.

Hollins Vale is a local nature reserve to the north of the village, it became Bury's third such nature reserve in 2003. It is managed for the benefit of the local wildlife and community by Hollins Conservation Group.

The reservation consists of woodland, marshland, open grassland (which is managed by cattle that roam the area), and historic hedgerows. Hollins Brook, a tributary of the River Roch, meanders through the valley and connects with "The Cut," a canal-like lodge popular with local angling groups such as the Unsworth Anglers, before continuing west where it connects with Castle Brook and Whittle Brook.

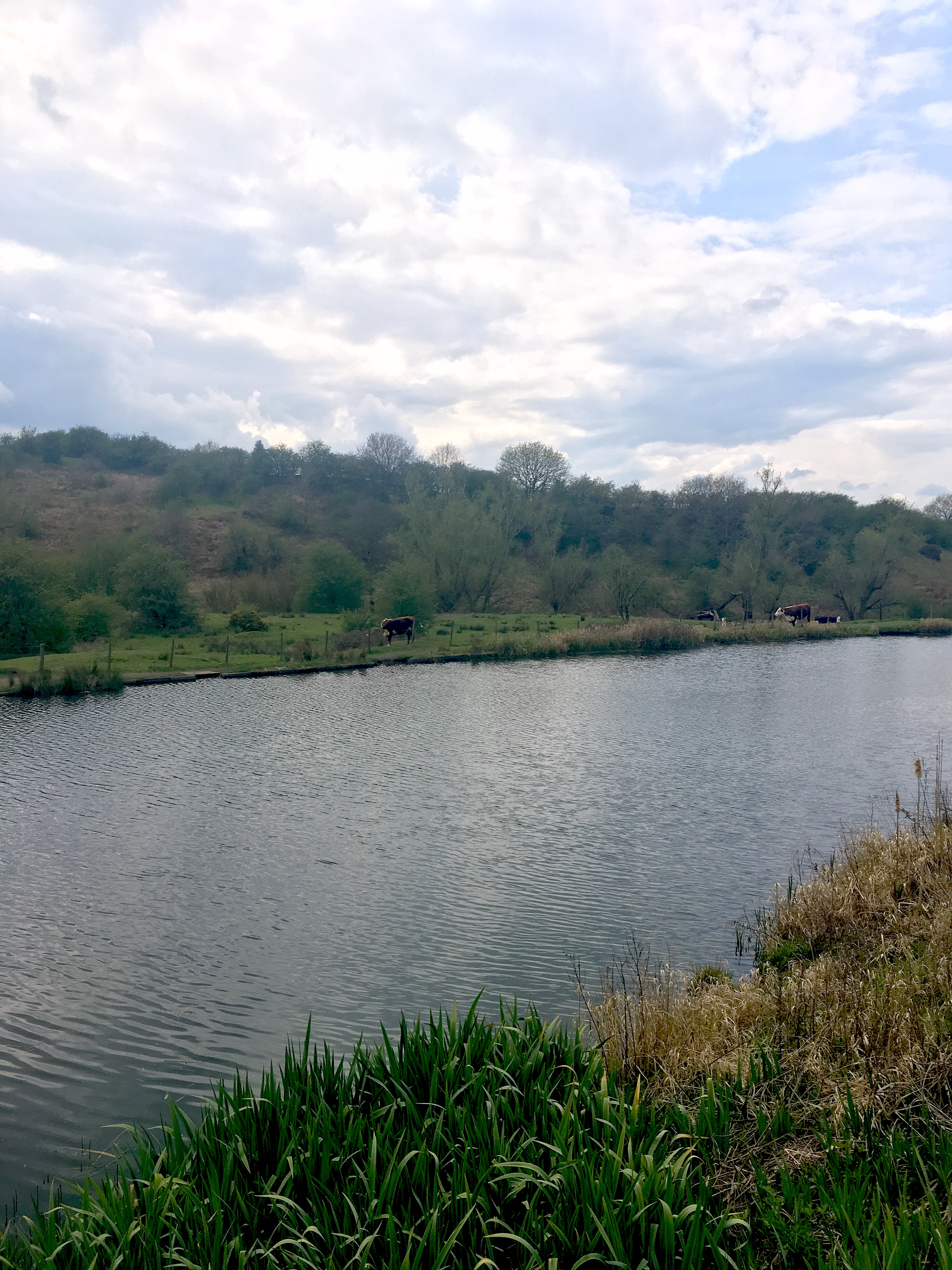
The Cut, a fishing ground located within the Hollins Vale Nature Reserve, Unsworth.

Hollins Vale contains two of Bury's fifty Sites of Biological Importance, first granted in 1981 owing to its biodiversity. The first is a portion of Hollins Vale's grasslands, which is home to a diverse range of waterside plants. The second is Hollins Plantation, a historic woodland containing bluebells, lesser celandines, wood speedwells, wood anemones, and violets. The reserve is also home to many species of wildlife such as linnet, reed bunting, snipe and grey partridge. The birds and small mammals attract predators such as kestrel, sparrowhawk, buzzard, tawny owl, weasel and stoat. Many species of butterfly are part of the ecosystem as is an increasing rabbit population. In the summer, significant populations of dragonflies and damselflies can be seen in the wetland areas.

Recent construction efforts have, and continue to threaten the ecology of the nature reserve. Since the construction of the M66 motorway, the populations of skylark, lapwing and hare have disappeared. As of 2020, plans are being developed by the local council to build 200 homes within 100m of the reservation, which may have further impacts on its ecology and biodiversity.

The reserve houses multiple walking trails, managed by Hollins Conservation Group. Although not all public footpaths are clearly defined, and there is no formal circular route, there are multiple routes available. The nature reserve is popular with locals, with the Conservation Group organising activity days such as the annual "Go Wild" event, encouraging locals to engage with their surroundings.

=== Unsworth Moss ===
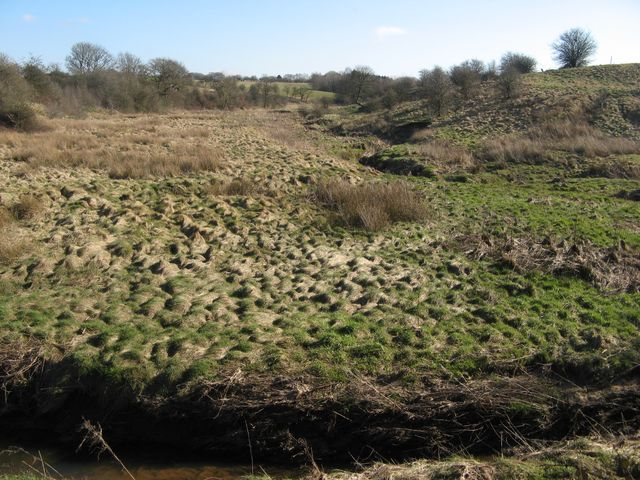
The undulating landscape of Unsworth Moss, cut through by Whittle Brook

Unsworth Moss is a predominantly agricultural area of undulating terrain, containing several woodland blocks. The area that lies along the eastern edge of Unsworth, hedged by Hollins Brook, makes up the Moss, and is distinct from the rest of Unsworth in its relatively agricultural setting, compared to the predominantly residential use of land in the west of the village. Whittle Brook flows north west through Unsworth Moss, forming the wetland conditions which have caused peat to form around its bank. The local environment is further shaped by Castle Brook, which flows from south to north to a confluence with Whittle Brook; these intersecting river corridors and the surrounding peat create a localised risk of groundwater flooding at and below ground level in the south-west of the moss. Historically, Unsworth Moss was an expansive tract of wet mossland that was progressively drained and repurposed into piecemeal enclosed farmland. Today, while much of the area serves as enclosed farmland, portions of the historic mossland now lie beneath modern residential development.

The landscape has a varied history of human and scientific use. Multiple archeological investigations have suggested the possibility of a medieval iron smelting site on Unsworth Moss, by the banks of Whittle Brook. In the 19th century, the remaining open moss was utilised for equestrian hound hunting. A notable local incident occurred in 1864 when a Middleton doctor died of apoplexy after repeatedly falling from his horse while riding with the Oldham hounds across the terrain. The moss also has historic botanical interest. In 1906, the rare moss species splachnum ampullaceum was recorded as growing there, while it was thought to be in decline.

The brook remains a defining feature of the undulating landscape. In a 2021 report, the Greater Manchester Combined Authority noted that the 'u-shaped valleys of the brook and associated vegetation form pleasant characteristic features in the landscape.' Unsworth Moss forms a habitat for farmland birds as well as great crested newt and barn owl. Several public footpaths and walking trails cross over Unsworth Moss; Bury Council maintains two footbridges in its north-eastern area, which are used by walkers to access the Moss.

=== Boz Park ===
Boz Park is a public green space situated on the southern border of Unsworth and the Hillock estate. Its ecology is characterised by young woodland, open grassland, and established aquatic habitats. The park contains several ponds that host a diverse range of aquatic life, including cased caddisflies, tadpoles, dragonfly nymphs, and leeches, alongside protected amphibian species such as the great crested newt. The local ecosystem is actively managed by conservation groups to clear invasive botanical species, such as Himalayan balsam.

Historically, the land was gifted to the community by a local farmer in memory of his late son, Colin "Boz" Tracey, from whom the park derives its name.

The park has been the subject of several targeted environmental conservation efforts. In 2007, a grant of £14,000 funded ecological improvements to establish a dedicated breeding ground for the great crested newt to meet local Biodiversity Action Plan targets. This was followed in 2009 by the creation of two additional ponds funded by the Amphibian and Reptile Group of South Lancashire (ARGSL). The park's tree coverage has also been continually expanded; 240 trees were planted in 2020 as part of the Northern Forest initiative, and a further 20 oak trees were planted in 2024 by the University of Manchester to mark its bicentenary.

Following a £90,000 infrastructure investment, alongside a 2025 public consultation, Boz Park was officially declared as Bury's eighth Local Nature Reserve in April 2026. The designation formally recognised the site's growing biodiversity to protect its habitats from future development.

The park serves as an important recreational space for the surrounding suburban estates. It frequently hosts community engagement activities, including pond-dipping sessions, and "Citizen Forester" volunteer days. The site is also an established visual and recreational receptor for users of the local public rights of way network.

== Demography ==
=== Population change ===
Population change in Unsworth
Year	1789	1792	1841	1891	1901	1911	1921	1931	1961	1991	2001	2011	2021
Pop.	575	755	826	2,640	2,698	2,707	2,542	2,461	8,197	9,223	10,058	9,492	11,034
±%	—	+31.3%	+9.4%	+219.6%	+2.2%	+0.3%	−6.1%	−3.2%	+233.1%	+12.5%	+9.1%	−5.6%	+16.2%
Sources: A History of Whitefield; A Topographical Dictionary of England; A Vision of Britain through Time; NOMIS (ONS); Office for National Statistics - Census 2021

== Religion ==
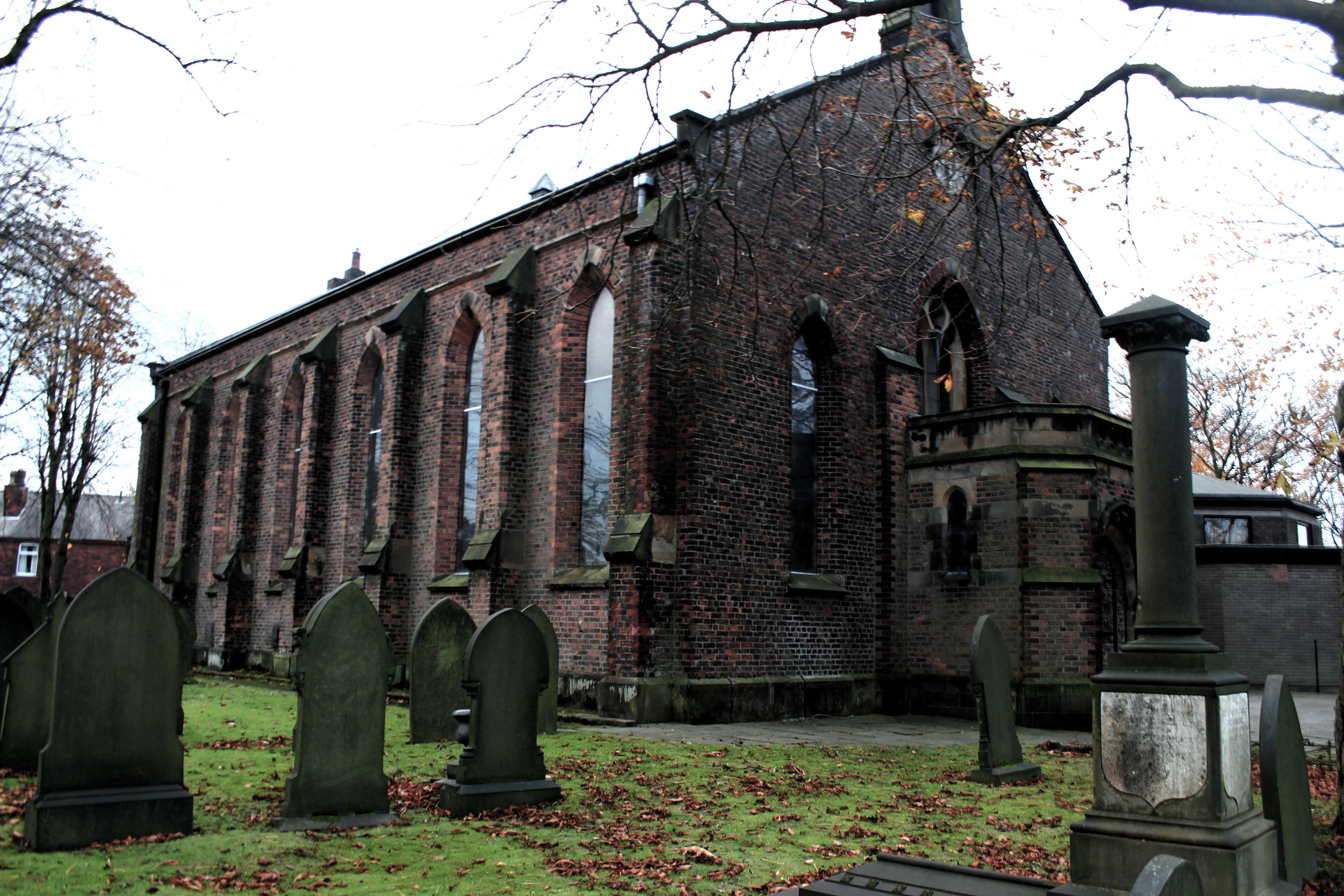
St George's Church, Unsworth

Unsworth chapelry is included part of the parish of Middleton. St George's Chapel was consecrated in November 1730 on a site provided by the Earl of Derby. The chapel was rebuilt at a cost of £1,500 in 1843 by the architects' practice Paley, Austin and Paley The church is built in brick with a bellcote, and has a graveyard to the north. A screen was installed enclosing the chancel in 1920 and removed in 1988. In 2009 the church completed a £70,000 refurbishment which saw repairs to the roof, interior redecoration, and the replacement of the old wooden pews with individual seats.

In 1846 a chapel was erected by Wesleyan Methodists on Hollins Lane, along with a Sunday school. They have since been demolished and replaced by a Methodist church.

== Landmarks ==
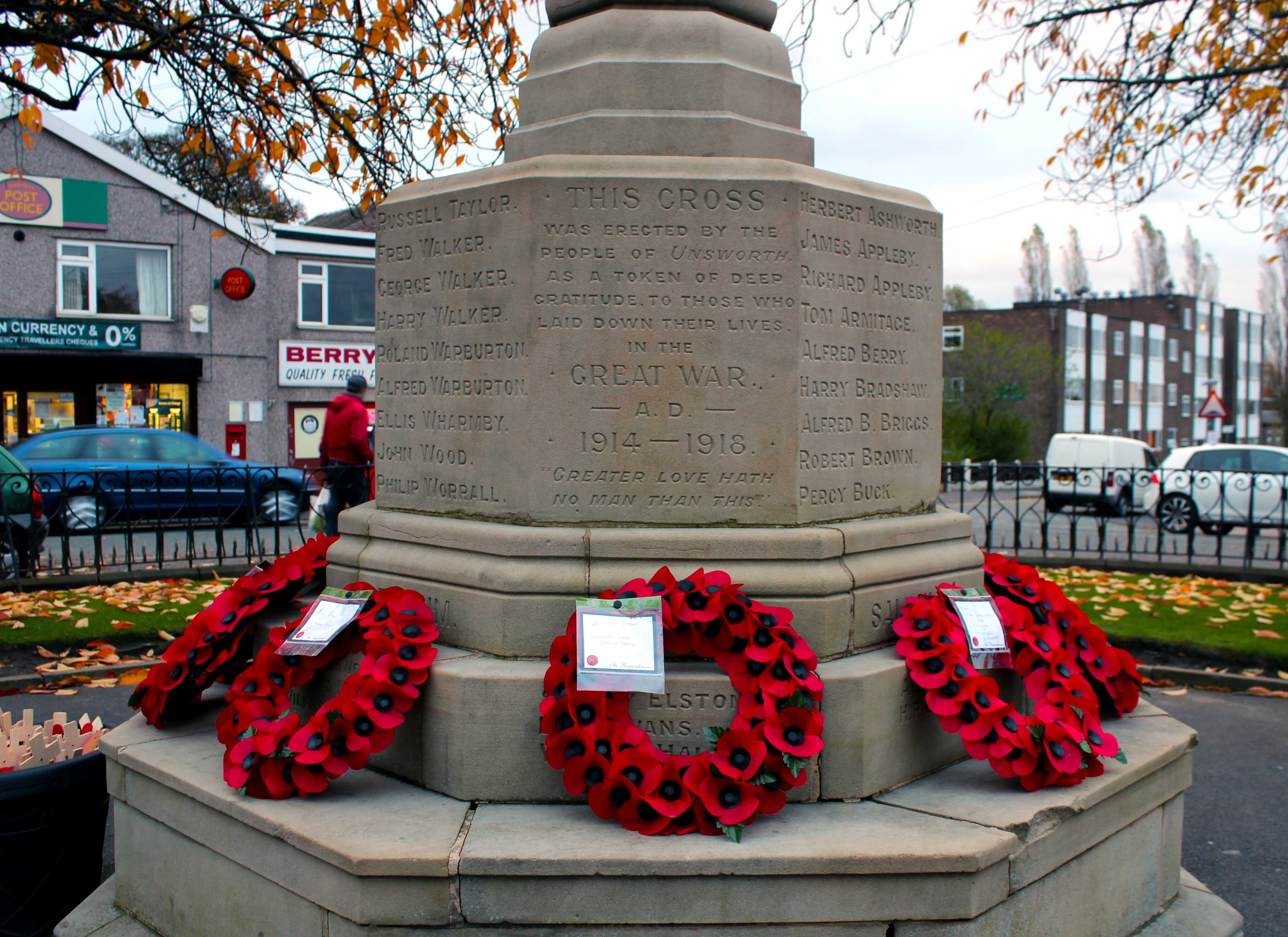
Unsworth Pole War Memorial covered in poppy wreaths after Remembrance Sunday.

After the First World War, a war memorial was erected at Unsworth Pole, it contains the names of 60 who died in the First World War and eight who died in the Second World War. In 2017, the monument was given Grade II listed building status.

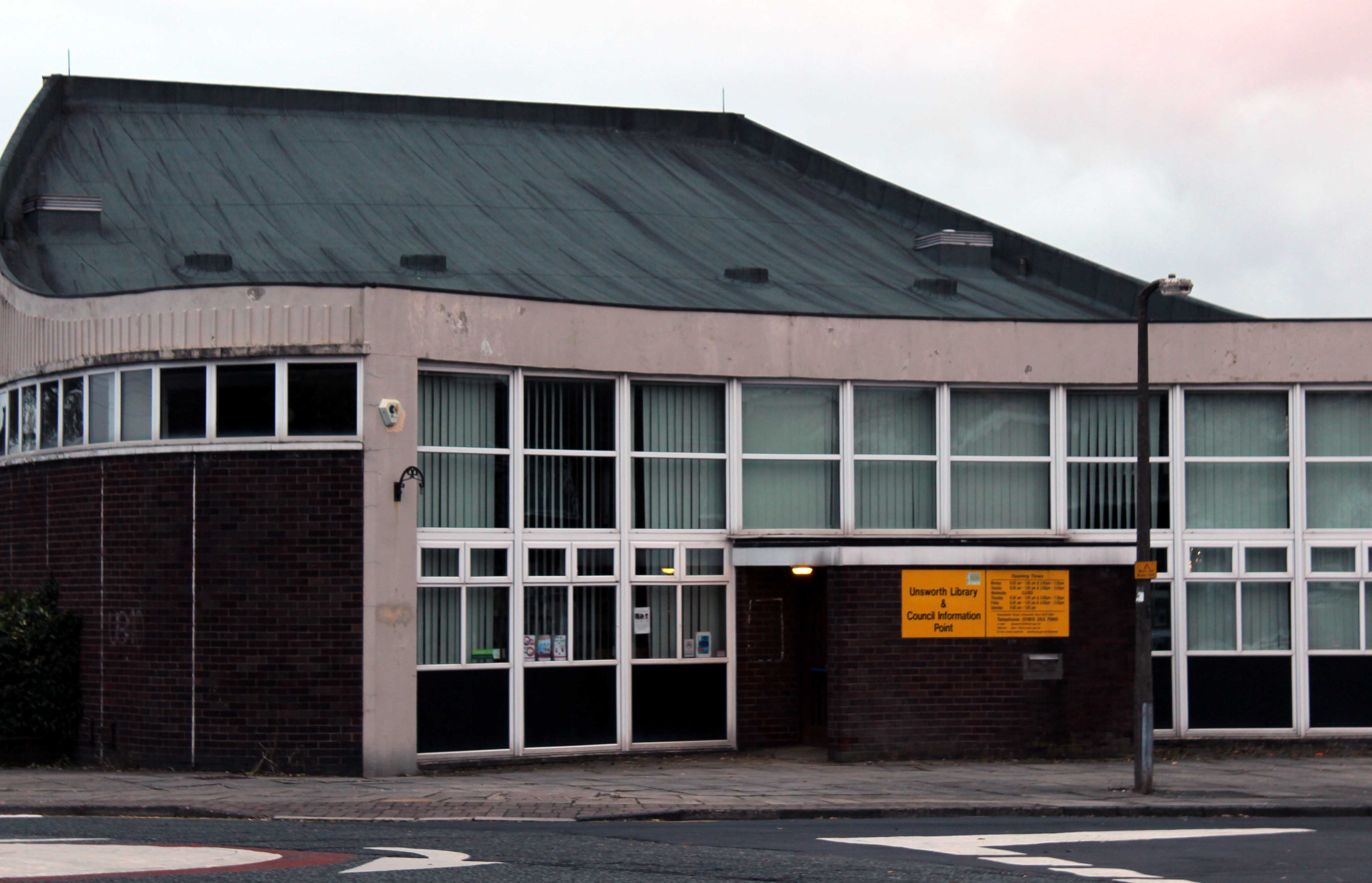
Unsworth Library (closed Dec 2017).

Unsworth Library was part of the Bury Libraries group. Prior to its closure, architectural assessments noted that the small building was physically attached to a local welfare centre, structurally classified as part of the area's suburban commercial core due to its position surrounded by retail shops. Proposals to close the library in 2010 met with opposition. Local musician Guy Garvey was amongst the opposers, claiming to have written some of his best lyrics (for his band Elbow) at the library, finding it to be "a source of inspiration”. The proposal was withdrawn in January 2011. However, the library was eventually closed down in December 2017. The building was briefly reopened in July 2021 as 'The Unsworth Centre', a community hub featuring a book exchange and coffee shop run by volunteers, but abruptly closed indefinitely just a year later in July 2022 due to a lack of sustained funding and volunteer support.

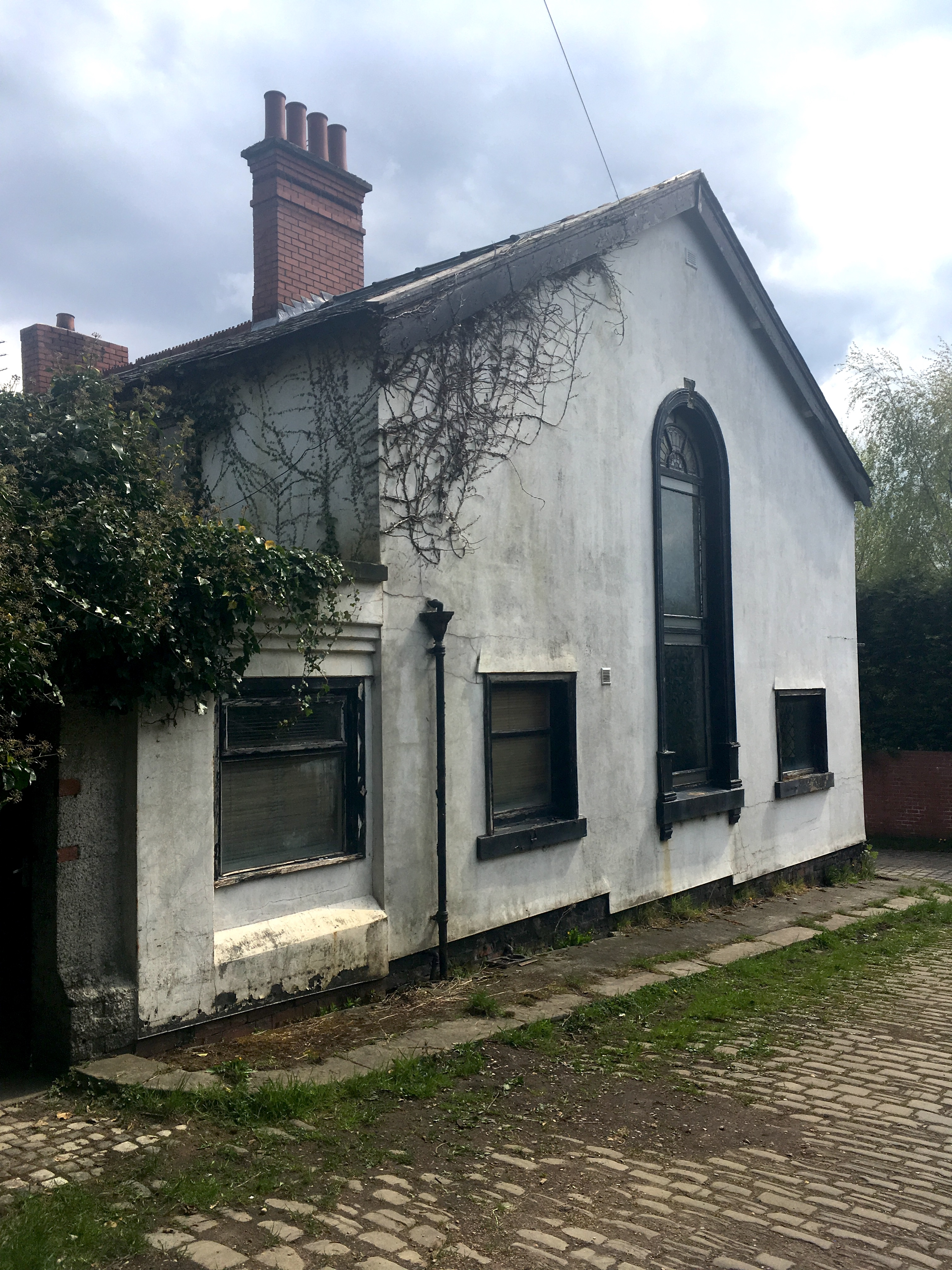
Pilsworth Cottages in the north east of Unsworth

Unsworth Hall (historically mapped as Unsworth Lodge) is a 19th-century Georgian square house that now forms the clubhouse of Bury Golf Club. Throughout the 19th century, the estate served as a substantial mansion house featuring extensive grounds, coach-houses, and an ornamental piece of water, serving as a residence for regional clergy, gentry, and industrial figures. Early occupants included John Rutter Lamb, a calico printer in the early 1800s, and the Reverend Thomas Foxley, Rector of Radcliffe, who died there in December 1839. Records also show how resident Mary Bealey swapped several distinct architectural features, such as grates and mantelpieces, between the Lodge and the White House at Radcliffe in 1849. By the 1850s, the lodge was the residence of wealthy cotton manufacturer Thomas Lomax Openshaw. By 1865, the mansion was occupied by Arthur Ashton, Esq., before eventually becoming the home of the first mayor of Bury, John Duckworth Esq. J.P., whose wife Anne died there in 1884. Following this era, the estate was purchased by Bury Golf Club in 1920 to construct a new links. The building was subsequently extended during the 1950s and is currently on Bury Council's list of non-designated heritage assets.

The village also contains two Grade II listed 17th-century agricultural buildings. Brick Farmhouse is a presumed 17th-century, two-storey building with a front rendering, believed to be the oldest brick-built farmhouse in the area. Nearby, Lower Whittle Farmhouse is a 17th-century timber-framed structure that underwent substantial rebuilding in the 18th and 19th centuries.

== Education ==
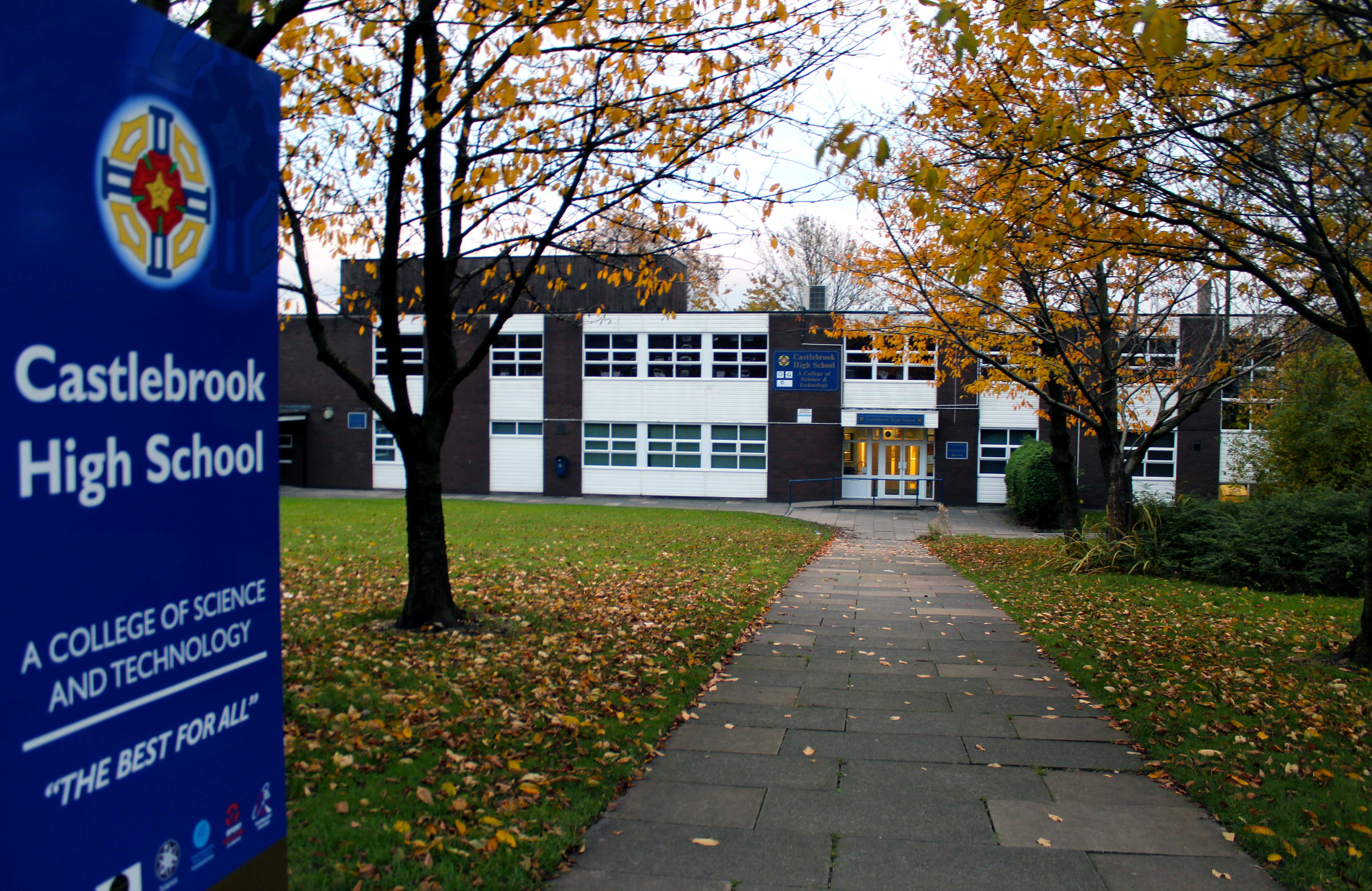
Unsworth Academy, (formerly Castlebrook High School)

Historically, the village contained several early educational institutions. John Heap's 1850 directory records that Unsworth possessed a National School, a Wesleyan School, and a private ladies' seminary located at Hollins Mount.

In the modern era, the area was the site of Bury's first comprehensive school, built in 1971. Unsworth Comprehensive was later renamed Castlebrook High School, and was recently changed again to Unsworth Academy. The school achieved a "Good" rating from Ofsted in 2019, an improvement from a "satisfactory" rating in 2006. Following major rebuilding and rebranding, the local council approved a further physical expansion in 2022, constructing a new six-classroom block to increase its capacity to over 1,000 pupils. The area is also a growing hub for Special Educational Needs and Disabilities (SEND) provision; in 2024, Brookhaven School opened on the former Castlebrook secondary site, a specialist facility catering to 80 students with autism and communication difficulties.

Unsworth also has four primary schools:

- Unsworth Primary School near Parr Lane, established in 1965;
- Sunny Bank Primary School, established in 1959
- Hollins Grundy Primary School near Hollins Lane, established in 1972;
- Bury and Whitefield Jewish Primary School, established in 1984.

== Public services ==
Before the closing of its public enquiry counter in 2017, Unsworth residents had been able to access services in neighbouring Whitefield, however the nearest accessible police station to Unsworth is currently in Bury. A Police Community Support Officer is assigned directly to the village, along with an Inspector, a Police Sergeant, and a Police Constable.

Public transport is co-ordinated by Transport for Greater Manchester. The 97 bus runs along Hollins Lane, connecting the village with both Manchester and Bury, The 94 also runs between North Manchester General Hospital and Bury every hour, while the 135 to services between Bury and Manchester, along with the 95 service between Bury and Salford can be accessed from the Blackford Bridge bus stop on Unsworth's western boundary.

Statutory emergency fire and rescue service is provided by the Greater Manchester Fire and Rescue Service, with the closest fire station being in Whitefield.

== Culture ==
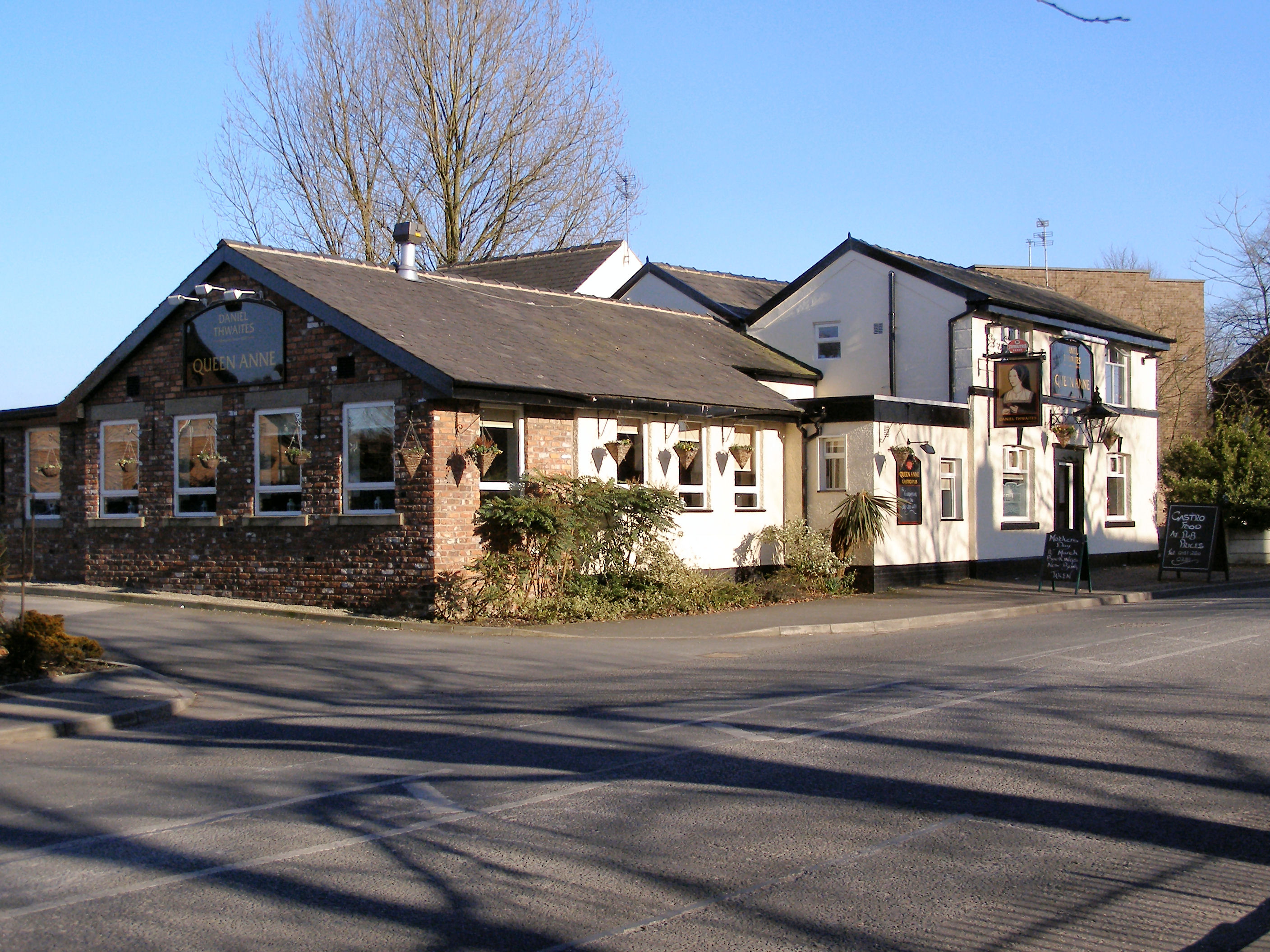
Queen Anne (public house), Hollins Lane

The Pole (or Unsworth Pole) was named after the pitch pole fixed by the Earl of Derby which was greased each year for the village's pot fair which was last held over a century ago. The challenge was to climb the greased pole to claim the prize. The last known successful ascender was Adam Holt in 1900. The current pole is not the original which was blown over in a gale, falling into the Bay Horse Inn.

Local legend suggests Robert Clive had ties to the area in his early years, however this appears to be false. The claim was first recorded by Francis Gerald Downing of Unsworth Vicarage in a self-published pamphlet. None of Clive's biographers make any reference to Unsworth.

The area holds significant ties to regional brewing history; Joseph Holt, the founder of Manchester's independent Joseph Holt's Brewery, was born in Unsworth in 1813 as the son of a local weaver. The village is home to several historic public houses that have been operating since at least 1850, including the Bay Horse and the Queen Anne. Other local pubs include the Hollins Bush Inn and the Sir Robert Peel. Former public houses include The Dragon, referencing the Unsworth Dragon legend, which was converted into a Co-Op food shop; The Bridge Inn at Blackford Bridge (also operational since at least 1850), which was demolished after it was irreparably damaged in a gas explosion in March 1998; and the Lord Clive, constructed in 1964 and demolished in 2020. Furthermore, the historic settlement core of the village, originally centred around Unsworth Pole, was drastically altered after the 1950s when modern shops and housing developments were built directly over the historic footprint.

=== Folklore ===
The village is closely associated with a local legend known as the Unsworth Dragon. According to tradition, the area was terrorised by a fierce dragon that devoured local livestock and villagers. The beast was supposedly slain by Thomas Unsworth, a local estate owner, who realised standard ammunition was useless against the dragon's scales. Instead, he loaded his dagger into a petronel (an early firearm) and shot the blade directly into the monster's throat.

The legend was heavily entwined with the ancestral identity of the Unsworth family, who claimed their lands were granted as a reward for this deed. The family possessed a heavily carved commemorative oak table depicting Saint George and the Dragon, the Eagle and Child, the Derby crest, and the letters "CV" (believed to stand for Cursus Vitae). The family's historic coat of arms (a man in black armour holding a hatchet) was also said to depict Thomas Unsworth in the armour he wore during the battle. The myth remains a prominent piece of local culture, frequently adapted into regional folk literature and serving as the subject of a multimedia art installation hosted by Bury Art Museum in 2016.

== Sport ==
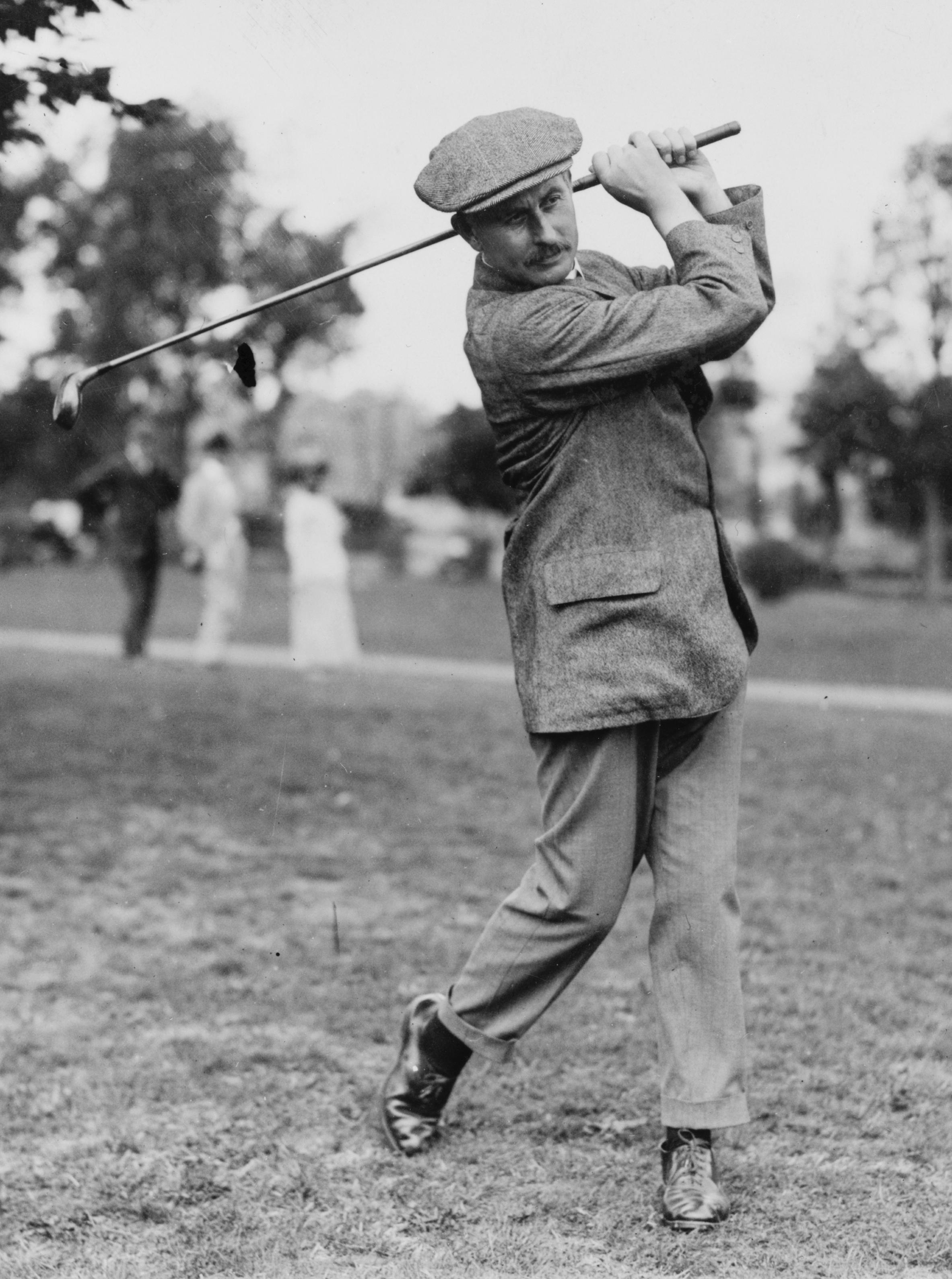
Harry Vardon, a famous golfer who originated from Bury Golf Club in Unsworth.

Unsworth Cricket Club was founded in 1883 on Pole Lane and is a member of the Central Lancashire Cricket League.

Bury Golf Club, founded in 1890 as a 9-hole course at Redvales, moved to Unsworth in 1921 where it has an 18-hole course. The clubhouse is based at Unsworth Hall and has a room commemorating Harry Vardon who won seven major championships from 1896 to 1914.

Pike Fold Golf Club was founded 1909 and moved to Back o' th' Moss Farm in 1999. In November 2024, the club was granted planning permission to drastically alter and reconfigure seven of its 18 holes to maintain a safe distance from the encroaching £200 million Simister Island motorway widening scheme on the M60/M66.

Unsworth Cricket and Tennis Club, situated on Pole Lane, is historically rooted in the village. In April 2026, developers submitted plans to expand the club's sporting offerings by constructing five covered padel courts and a food and beverage area.

Unsworth Junior Football Club, established in 1974, has 24 teams ranging from Under 8s to Under 18s. The teams practice at Hillock, and play in the North Bury Junior Football League, where the Under 18s team plays in the Premier Division.

Castlebrook Community Sports Centre in the grounds of Castlebrook High School has a floodlit astroturf pitch and two sports halls.

== Notable people ==
- Gemma Atkinson (born 1984), actress and broadcaster, educated at Castlebrook High School.
- Albert Broome (1900–1989), professional footballer who played as a forward for Oldham Athletic and Manchester United.
- Les Dawson (1931–1993), comedian, actor, and writer, who lived in Unsworth from 1963 until the early 1980s.
- Guy Garvey (born 1974), lead singer of Elbow, who used Unsworth Library as a creative base and campaigned to save it.
- Jodie Gibson (born 1992), gold-medal winning England international netball player, educated at Castlebrook High School.
- Joseph Holt (1813–1880), weaver's son born in Unsworth who went on to establish Joseph Holt's Brewery in Manchester.
- Harry Kay (1883–1954), professional footballer who played as a full-back for Bolton Wanderers, Leeds City, and Swindon Town.
- Wayne Madsen (born 1984), professional cricketer who played as an overseas professional for Unsworth Cricket Club.
- Joseph Proudman (1888–1975), mathematician and oceanographer, a Fellow of the Royal Society known for the Taylor–Proudman theorem.
- Trevor Sinclair (born 1973), international footballer who played for England, educated at Castlebrook High School.
- Dion Taljard (born 1970), South African first-class cricketer who played professionally for Unsworth Cricket Club.
- Harry Vardon (1870–1937), professional golfer and six-time Open Championship winner, who served as the first club professional at Bury Golf Club in Unsworth.
- John Warburton (1919–2004), press photographer and senior figure in the British Union of Fascists, who was educated at St George's Church of England School in Unsworth.
