= RAF Heywood =

Former Royal Air Force maintenance unit in Lancashire, England

RAF Heywood
- Near Heywood, Lancashire (now Greater Manchester) in England

Site information
- Type: Royal Air Force logistics and maintenance depot
- Owner: Ministry of Defence
- Operator: Royal Air Force
- Controlled by: RAF Maintenance Command
- Condition: Closed

Location
- Coordinates: 53.582°N 2.245°W

Site history
- Built: 1938
- In use: 1938–1968
- Fate: Became Heywood Distribution Park

Garrison information
- Occupants: No. 35 Maintenance Unit (35 MU)

Royal Air Force Heywood or RAF Heywood was a non-flying Royal Air Force station located mainly in Heywood, Lancashire (now Greater Manchester), England. Operating primarily as No. 35 Maintenance Unit (35 MU), the station served as a massive logistics, storage, and repair depot for the RAF under RAF Maintenance Command.

Constructed in 1938, the base provided crucial logistical support during the Second World War and into the Cold War. It was a highly dispersed facility, with storage sites spanning an area of up to 15 miles. The base officially closed in the late 1960s and the site was subsequently redeveloped into a commercial industrial estate, now known as the Heywood Distribution Park.

== History ==
=== Establishment ===
The establishment of a military depot in Heywood was initiated under the Air Ministry's pre-war Expansion Schemes. In the Air Estimates of 1937/38 and 1938/39, proposals were included to construct five new large-scale depots within No. 40 Group RAF, which included Carlisle, Quedgeley, Hartlebury, Stafford, and Heywood.

Constructed in 1938, the depot was built with extensive internal rail links connecting its dispersed sites to the national railway network, facilitating the movement of heavy equipment. Local historical accounts note that the base brought economic relief to the local area, which had experienced severe unemployment following the decline of the local cotton mills. The overall footprint of the facility was highly decentralised; while the headquarters was located centrally in Heywood, the various specialised storage sites covered an area extending up to 15 miles.

=== Second World War ===
During the Second World War, 35 MU operated as a Master Provisioning Office (MPO). By April 1945, alongside 61 MU and 68 MU, Heywood was responsible for the provisioning of nearly 48,000 items of miscellaneous airframe spares and standard hardware. The unit stored and distributed a wide variety of materiel, including balloon equipment, motor transport spares, and aircraft parts. The logistics operation even extended to international allies, including the tracking and replacement of coded shipments lost at sea en route to Vladivostok for the Soviet Union.

Despite being an RAF station, 35 MU was predominantly staffed by civilian workers. The distribution of replacement aircraft parts to RAF bases and ports required extensive transport networks. Local accounts suggest that much of this equipment was moved by regular lorry convoys, frequently driven at night during blackouts by female drivers to minimise the risk of enemy detection. Although located in the North West of England, away from the primary targets of the Battle of Britain, the Operational Record Book for 35 MU recorded 26 air raid alerts and two actual enemy attacks during 1940.

The maintenance unit also handled the direct repair and modification of fighter aircraft. Research compiled by local historians indicates that work at the base included the fitting of long-range fuel tanks to a Supermarine Spitfire Mk Vb (W3898) in September 1941, and the on-site repair of another Spitfire Mk Vb (EP646) in July 1942, after it sustained "Category AC" flying accident damage that was beyond its operational unit's capacity to fix.

=== Prisoner of war camps ===
Due to the highly dispersed nature of No. 35 Maintenance Unit, which covered an area of up to 15 miles, a peripheral section of the base reached the eastern boundary of nearby Unsworth, along Moss Hall Road. This outlying section was utilised as a prisoner-of-war camp. Local newspaper records confirm the camp housed both Italian and German prisoners of war, who were assigned to work at the logistics depot.

The Italian contingent consisted of approximately 100 prisoners, primarily younger soldiers captured during the Allied invasion of Sicily. While the main RAF headquarters operated under standard British military protocols, prisoner accounts note that this outlying camp was unusually structured. It was managed internally by Italian non-commissioned officers rather than being heavily monitored by British guards. According to the memoir of former prisoner Coriolano Caprara, a riot broke out after the men discovered that the camp's interpreter and Italian NCOs were suppressing food rations and secretly manufacturing furniture for personal profit. British officers subsequently intervened, expelled the NCOs, and restored order. The Italian prisoners remained at the Heywood camp until mid-April 1946, when they were transported to Glasgow for repatriation.

== Closure ==
No. 35 Maintenance Unit continued to serve as a government logistics hub into the post-war period. Operations at the unit were wound down in the late 1960s. Local historical timelines frequently place the cessation of operations around 1967. By June 1968, the closure process was formally documented in Parliament, with the Ministry of Defence reporting that approximately 13 per cent of the established civilian staff on the strength of 35 MU had been transferred to other government departments.

== Post-RAF use ==
Following the closure of the RAF station, the expansive warehousing footprint and infrastructure were absorbed by private shipping firms and commercial industries. The site eventually evolved into the Heywood Distribution Park, a large-scale industrial estate.

Local sources suggest that one of the few remaining physical remnants of the military presence is the former guard-house for "5 Site" located on Manchester Road. The building and its associated warehouses remained under government ownership and were reportedly utilised by the Department for Work and Pensions as a secure storage facility for benefit claim documents.

== See also ==
- List of former Royal Air Force stations
- List of Royal Air Force Maintenance units
- RAF Maintenance Command
