= Norman Coslett =

Royal Air Force Air Marshal (1909-1987)

Sir Norman Coslett
- Born: 8 November 1909; Cardiff, Wales
- Died: 9 November 1987 (aged 78); Wales
- Military career
- Allegiance: United Kingdom
- Branch: Royal Air Force
- Service years: 1926–66
- Rank: Air Marshal
- Commands: Maintenance Command (1963–66); No. 24 Group (1961–63); No. 1 School of Technical Training (1958–61); Airborne Forces Experimental Establishment (1948–49); RAF Lüneburg (1946–47)
- Conflicts: Second World War
- Awards: Knight Commander of the Order of the Bath; Officer of the Order of the British Empire

Air Marshal Sir Thomas Norman Coslett, KCB, OBE (8 November 1909 – 9 November 1987) was a senior Royal Air Force officer who served as Air Officer Commanding-in-Chief RAF Maintenance Command from 1963 to 1966.

== RAF career ==
Coslett joined the Royal Air Force in 1926. He served as a pilot with No. 216 Squadron at the beginning of the Second World War and was then sent to the United States as Liaison Officer to the American aircraft manufacturers in 1942 before returning to join the India Office at the Air Ministry in 1943.

After the war he was appointed Officer Commanding RAF Lüneburg and then became deputy director of Technical Training at the Air Ministry in 1947. He went on to be Commandant at the Airborne Forces Experimental Establishment in 1948, deputy director of Technical Planning at the Air Ministry in 1954 and Senior Technical Staff Officer at Headquarters Coastal Command in 1957. His last appointments were as Commandant at No 1 School of Technical Training in 1958, Air Officer Commanding No. 24 Group in 1961 and Air Officer Commanding Maintenance Command in 1963 before retiring in 1966.

In retirement he became a Director of Flight Refuelling.

Military offices
Preceded by Sir Leslie Dalton-Morris	Air Officer Commanding-in-Chief Maintenance Command; 1963–1966	Succeeded by Sir Kenneth Porter
