= Grahame Donald =

Rugby Union player and Royal Air Force Air Marshal (1891-1976)

Sir Grahame Donald
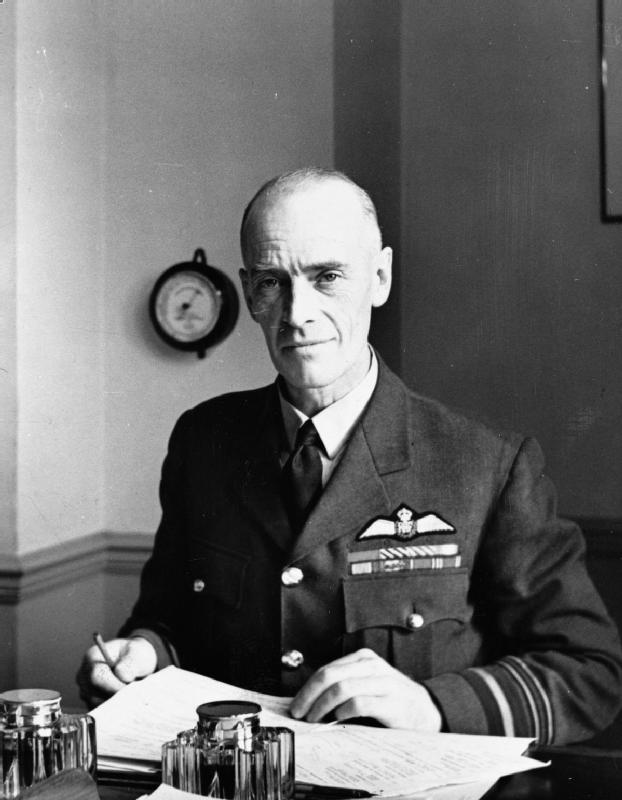
- Air Marshal Donald, Air Officer Commanding-in-Chief, RAF Maintenance Command, at his desk in his Headquarters in Andover, Hampshire.
- Born: 27 July 1891; Streatham, London, England
- Died: 23 December 1976 (aged 85); Hampshire, England
- Military career
- Allegiance: United Kingdom
- Branch: Royal Navy (1914–1918); Royal Air Force (1918–1947)
- Service years: 1914–1947
- Rank: Air Marshal
- Commands: Maintenance Command (1942–1947); No. 1 (Indian Wing) Station (1932–1933); School of Naval Co-operation (1929–1931); No. 201 Squadron (1928–1929); No. 3 Squadron (1921–1923); No. 205 Squadron (1920–1921)
- Conflicts: First World War; Russian Civil War; Second World War
- Awards: Knight Commander of the Order of the Bath; Distinguished Flying Cross; Air Force Cross; Mentioned in Despatches (2); War Cross, 2nd Class (Greece)
- School: Dulwich College
- University: University College, Oxford

Rugby union career
- Position: Prop
Senior career
Years	Team	Apps	(Points)
1911–14	Oxford University		
Provincial / State sides
Years	Team	Apps	(Points)
1913	Anglo-Scots		
1914	Blues Trial		
International career
Years	Team	Apps	(Points)
1914	Scotland	2	

Air Marshal Sir David Grahame Donald, KCB, DFC, AFC (27 July 1891 – 23 December 1976), often known as Sir Grahame Donald, was a Royal Naval Air Service pilot during the First World War, a senior Royal Air Force (RAF) officer between the wars and a senior RAF commander during the Second World War. In February 1939, Donald was appointed Director of Organisation at the Air Ministry. He was also a rugby union international having represented Scotland twice in 1914.

== Early life ==
David Grahame Donald was born on 27 July 1891 in Streatham, London, the son of Dr David Donald and Elizabeth ("Lizzie") Sherwood Donald. His father was born in Glasgow and his mother in Dundee, Forfarshire. He was baptised on 31 August 1891 at St Alban, Streatham Park.

Donald was educated at Dulwich College where he played in a school team that featured five future international rugby footballers. From Dulwich he went on to University College, Oxford, to study medicine. By this time his family were living in Churt, Surrey.

From Oxford he entered the Royal Navy Volunteer Reserve in 1914 as a surgeon probationer. He served aboard a hospital ship, torpedo boat and a destroyer before transferring to the Royal Navy Air Service in 1916.

== Rugby Union career ==
=== Amateur career ===
Whilst at Dulwich College he played in an unbeaten first XV in 1909 which contained five future internationals dubbed the 'Famous Five'. These five would all go on to play in the 1913 Varsity Match (and also produced the captains of both Oxford and Cambridge in 1919), and all served in the First World War. They were Eric Loudoun-Shand and Grahame Donald, who went on to play for Scotland, W. D. Doherty, who went on to play for and captain Ireland, J. E. Greenwood, who went on to play for and captain England, and the record-breaking Cyril Lowe.

=== Provincial career ===
Donald played for Anglo-Scots on 27 December 1913.

He played for Blues Trial against Whites Trial on 10 January 1914.

=== International career ===
From Oxford, Grahame Donald was selected in 1914 to play for Scotland, who he represented as a prop against Wales on 7 February, and Ireland on 28 February. His participation in the First World War and subsequent career in the military ended his international rugby career.

== Military career ==
Donald also became famous for his miraculous escape from death having fallen from his Sopwith Camel at 6,000 feet (1,800 m) in 1917. On a summer's afternoon he attempted a new manoeuvre in his Sopwith Camel and flew the machine up and over, and as he reached the top of his loop, hanging upside down, his safety belt snapped and he fell out. He was not wearing a parachute as a matter of policy. Incredibly, the Camel had continued its loop downwards, and Donald landed on its top wing. He grabbed it with both hands, hooked one foot into the cockpit and wrestled himself back in, struggled to take control, and executed "an unusually good landing". In an interview given 55 years later he explained, "The first 2,000 feet passed very quickly and terra firma looked damnably 'firma'. As I fell I began to hear my faithful little Camel somewhere nearby. Suddenly I fell back onto her."

Eleven Royal Air Force aircraft based at Biorko, Finland, under the command of Squadron Leader D. Grahame Donald stage a night-time raid on the Bolshevik naval base at Kronstadt during the Baltic campaign of the Russian Civil War. After the raid, Donald reports that "a destroyer depot ship disappeared and was not seen again."

He was appointed Officer Commanding No. 205 Squadron in 1920, Officer Commanding No. 3 Squadron and Station Commander at RAF Leuchars in 1921 before he moved on with his new squadron to RAF Gosport the following year. He joined the Directing Staff at the RAF Staff College, Andover, in 1924 and became Officer Commanding No. 201 Squadron in 1928. He went on to be Officer Commanding the School of Naval Co-operation in 1929, Officer Commanding No 1 (Indian Wing) Station at Kohat in India and then rejoined the Directing Staff, RAF Staff College in 1935. After a tour as instructor at the Imperial Defence College in 1937 he became Director-General of Organisation, a post he held at the start of the Second World War. He was made Deputy Air Member for Supply and Organisation in 1941 and Air Officer Commanding-in-Chief at Maintenance Command in 1942 before retiring in 1947.

== Honours and awards ==
- 3 June 1919 – Mention in Despatches – "Capt. David Grahame Donald for valuable services rendered during the war (Coast Patrol)".
- 22 December 1919 – Distinguished Flying Cross – "Flight Lieutenant David Grahame Donald, AFC, in recognition of distinguished services rendered during the War and since the close of hostilities (BALTIC)".
- 1 July 1941 – Companion of the Order of the Bath – "Air Vice-Marshal David Grahame Donald, DFC, AFC".
- 1 January 1944 – Knight Commander of the Order of the Bath – "Acting Air Marshal David Grahame Donald, CB, DFC, AFC, RAF".

== Personal life ==
His first marriage was to Gwyneth Martin in 1916. They had a son, born 1917, Flight Lieutenant Ian David Grahame Donald, who was shot down off Dover in a Boulton Paul Defiant and died in 1940, and a daughter, Jean who became a WAAF officer. After the death of his first wife he married Ailsa Stevenson in 1947 in October 1947, they had a daughter.

== Bibliography ==
- Dobson, Christopher; Miller, John (1986). The Day They Almost Bombed Moscow: The Allied War in Russia, 1918-1920. New York: Atheneum. ISBN 9780689117138. - Total pages: 288

Military offices
Preceded by Sir John Bradley	Air Officer Commanding-in-Chief Maintenance Command; 1942–1947	Succeeded by Sir Cyril Cooke
