= RAF Maintenance Command =

Former command of the Royal Air Force

Maintenance Command
- RAF Maintenance Command badge
- Active: 1 April 1938–31 August 1973
- Country: United Kingdom
- Branch: Royal Air Force
- Garrison/HQ: RAF Andover
- Motto: Service

RAF Maintenance Command was the Royal Air Force command which was responsible for controlling maintenance for all the United Kingdom-based units from formation on 1 April 1938 until being renamed RAF Support Command on 31 August 1973.

== History ==
Maintenance Command was formed in 1938. No. 40 Group RAF was formed within the command on 3 January 1939, and responsible for all equipment except bombs and explosives. No. 42 Group RAF was made responsible for fuel and ammunition storage.

In 1940, technical control (but not administrative control) of No. 41 Group and No. 43 Group of Maintenance Command passed to the Ministry of Aircraft Production. One important change made within days of the Ministry's creation was it taking over the RAF aircraft storage Maintenance Units which were found to have accepted 1,000 aircraft from industry, but issued only 650 to squadrons. These management and organisational changes bore results almost immediately: in the first four months of 1940, 2,729 aircraft were produced of which 638 were fighters, while in the following four months crucial to the Battle of Britain combat during May to August 1940, production rose to 4,578 aircraft, of which 1,875 were fighters. This production rate was two and a half times Germany's fighter production at the time. The ministry was additionally able to repair and return to service nearly 1,900 aircraft.

From 7 October 1940, operational control of salvage was administered by a section of No. 43 Group RAF (Maintenance), known as No. 43 Group Salvage, with a headquarters at the Morris Motor Works in Cowley. The administrative headquarters later moved to Magdalen College, Oxford. Maintenance units responsible for salvage were responsible for vast areas of the country.

Responsibility for these groups returned to Maintenance Command after World War II following the absorption of the Ministry of Aircraft Production into the Ministry of Supply (MoS). The foundation stone for a new Command Headquarters at RAF Andover was laid in November 1960.

When the RAF took delivery of the Blue Danube nuclear weapon (in sections) the HCCL plant near Leeds was one of only four places from where 40 Group organised armed escorted road convoys direct to RAF Wittering. The others were AWRE Aldermaston, ROF Burghfield, ROF Chorley (Lancashire), and Woolwich Arsenal.

No. 40 Group was disbanded on 28 July 1961. Maintenance Command was absorbed into Support Command in August 1973.

== Organisation ==
As of 1940 the command was organised as a headquarters and four groups:

1. Equipment Group [No 40]
2. Aircraft Group [No 41, HQ Andover January 1939 - July 1961; MU's included No. 7 MU?]
3. Armament and Fuel Group [No 42]
4. Repair and Salvage Group [No 43]

Nos 42 and 43 Groups disbanded on 2 January 1956; No. 41 Group on 21 July 1961; and No. 40 Group a week later on 28 July 1961.

Maintenance Units included:

- No. 14 Maintenance Unit, RAF Carlisle
- No. 16 Maintenance Unit, RAF Stafford
- No. 18 Maintenance Unit, RAF Tinwald Downs, No. 41 Group
- No. 19 Maintenance Unit, RAF St Athan (7 Feb 1939 – 1 Nov 1968/7 Apr 1999)
- No. 20 Maintenance Unit, RAF Aston Down, No. 41 Group (see Flightglobal.com)
- No. 21 Maintenance Unit, RAF Fauld, No. 42 Group
- No. 22 Maintenance Unit, RAF Silloth
- No. 25 Maintenance Unit, RAF Hartlebury
- No. 32 Maintenance Unit, RAF St Athan (1 Jul 1939 – 1 Nov 1968/7 Apr 1999)
- No. 35 Maintenance Unit, RAF Heywood
- No. 49 Maintenance Unit, RAF Faygate

== Commanders ==
Commanders-in-Chief included:

- 31 Mar 1938 – Air Marshal Sir John Bradley
- 5 Oct 1942 – Air Marshal Sir Grahame Donald
- 9 Apr 1947 – Air Marshal Sir Cyril Cooke
- 15 Oct 1949 – Air Marshal Sir Thomas Warne-Browne
- 20 Dec 1952 – Air Marshal Sir Leslie Harvey
- 16 Jan 1956 – Air Marshal Sir Richard Jordan
- 5 May 1958 – Air Marshal Sir Douglas Jackman
- 1 Mar 1961 – Air Marshal Sir Leslie Dalton-Morris
- 4 Jun 1963 – Air Marshal Sir Norman Coslett
- 2 Jul 1966 – Air Marshal Sir Kenneth Porter
- 13 Apr 1970 – Air Marshal Sir John Rowlands
- 2 Jun 1973 – Air Marshal Sir Reginald Harland

== See also ==
- List of Royal Air Force commands
