= Samuel Brooksworth =

British-Ghanaian businessman (born 1988)

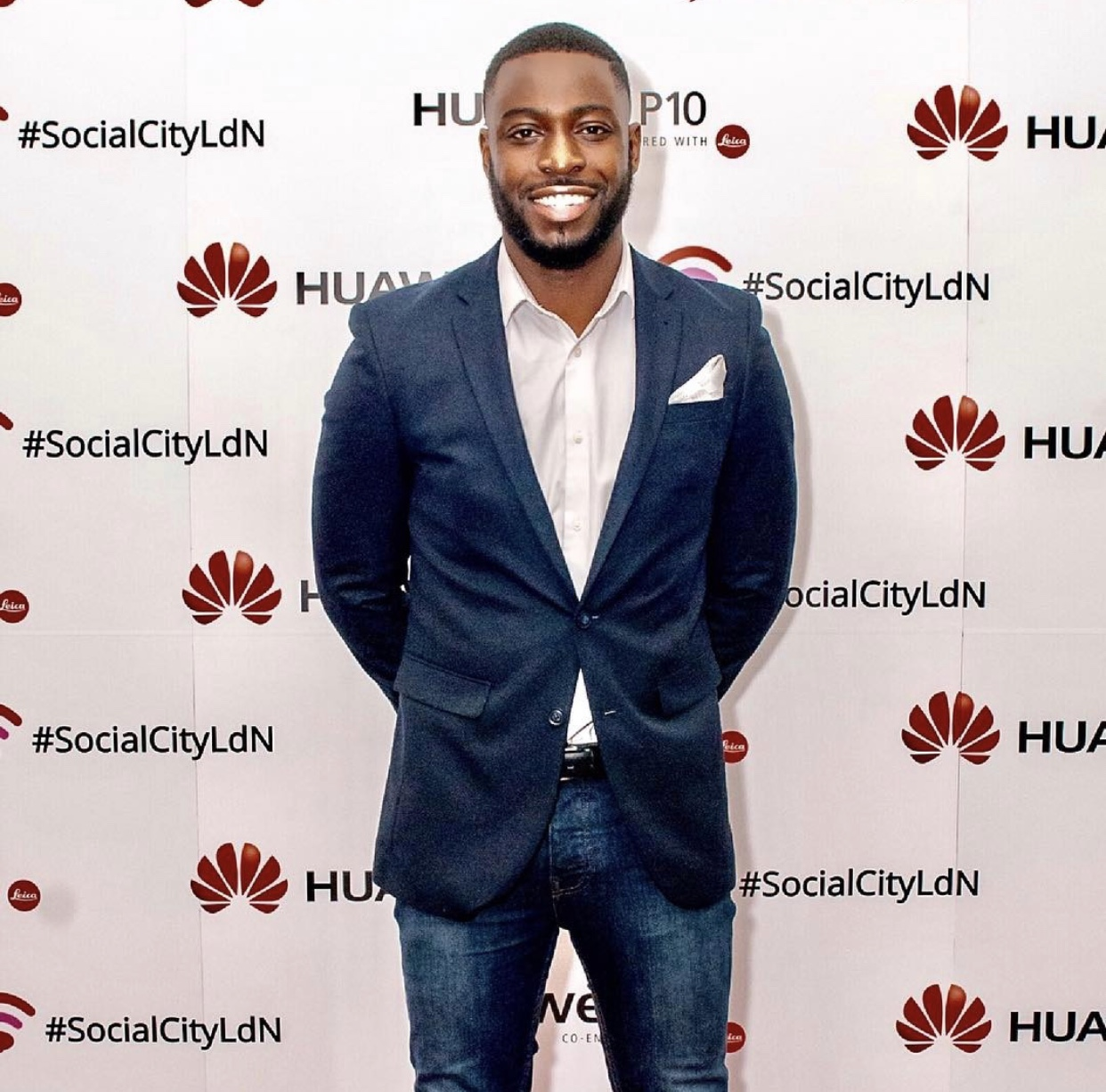
- Samuel Brooksworth BBC's The Apprentice, 2016
- Born: Samuel Boateng; 23 September 1988 (age 38); Lewisham, South London, England
- Occupation: Entrepreneur
- Television: The Apprentice (2016)

Samuel Brooksworth (born Samuel Boateng, 23 September 1988) is a British-Ghanaian businessman and the Founder and Chief Executive Officer of Remoteli. Brooksworth first came to public attention in 2016 when he became a contestant on BBC One's the Apprentice. After the show Brooksworth founded the Startup Accelerator Build and Master, educating and mentoring entrepreneurs to grow and scale their businesses. In 2020 Brooksworth then founded Remoteli. Remoteli is an on-demand staffing organisation supporting businesses globally in building remote workforces. Services include Business Assistance, Customer Service Support, Social Media Management, Business Development and Software Development. In 2022, Remoteli was named Global Startup of the Year at the Startup Awards National Series.

== Early life ==
Brooksworth, whose parents emigrated from Ghana in the 1970s, was born in 1988 in Lewisham, South London. He is an identical twin and the oldest of 5 siblings. His younger brother was a contestant on a reality series Love Island in 2020.

Brooksworth's family moved to Bury, Greater Manchester in 2000, where he attended Castlebrook High School and Holy Cross College.

Brooksworth left Bury to earn a Bachelor of Science Honours from Sheffield Hallam University in Information Technology and Business Studies.

== Career ==
=== Business ===
Brooksworth eventually moved back to London in 2013 and went on to work in various management roles. In 2017 Brooksworth founded the company Build and Master, a Startup Accelerator educating and mentoring entrepreneurs to grow and scale their businesses. In 2020 Brooksworth then founded Remoteli. Remoteli is an on-demand staffing organisation supporting businesses globally in building remote workforces.

=== The Apprentice ===
Brooksworth came to public attention when he participated in series 12 of BBC One's The Apprentice in 2016 hosted by Lord Sugar. Brooksworth project managed a task in week five of the show leading the team to victory. Brooksworth was the top salesperson throughout the show and went on to reach week seven before being eliminated.

== Awards ==
In 2022, Brooksworth led Remoteli as they were named winner of the Global Startup of the Year Award at the Startup Awards National Series. Brooksworth was nominated for a Guba Award in 2017 in the "Professional of the year" category for his work and rise in management through various companies. Brooksworth was also nominated for a Screen Nation Film & TV Award in 2017 in the "Favourite Reality TV Talent" category.
