= Pilsworth =

Coordinates: 53.57765°N 2.27668°W

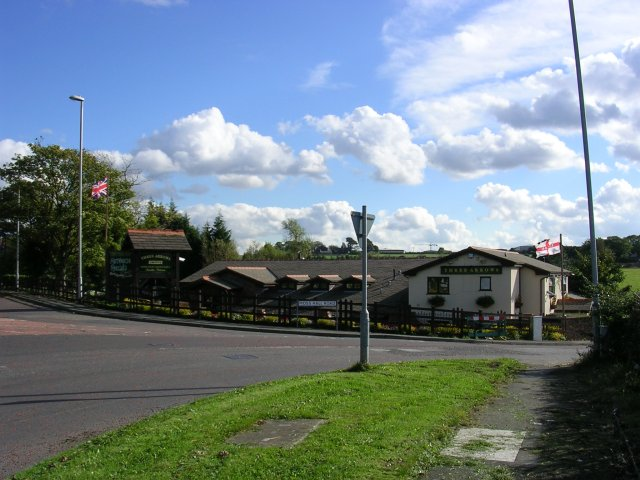
- Moss Hall Road

- Location within Greater Manchester
- Metropolitan borough: Bury
- Metropolitan county: Greater Manchester
- Region: North West
- Country: England
- Sovereign state: United Kingdom
- Police: Greater Manchester
- Fire: Greater Manchester
- Ambulance: North West

Pilsworth is an area in the Metropolitan Borough of Bury, Greater Manchester, England. Historically, it was a township and civil parish, but in 1894 it was divided between Bury, Heywood, and Unsworth.

It was formerly home to a retail and leisure complex called Park 66, consisting of a cinema, a ten-pin bowling alley, uperstore and a selection of food outlets.

In June 2016 work started on a multi-million pound re-development.

== History ==
Pilsworth was formerly a township in the parish of Middleton, in 1866 Pilsworth became a separate civil parish, in 1894 the parish was abolished to form Heywood and Unsworth, part also went to Bury. In 1891 the parish had a population of 867.

== See also ==
- Broadfield railway station
