= John Rowlands (RAF officer) =

Recipient of the George Cross and Royal Air Force Air Marshal (1915-2006)

Sir John Rowlands
- Born: 23 September 1915; Hawarden, Flintshire
- Died: 4 June 2006 (aged 90); Sheffield, South Yorkshire
- Military career
- Allegiance: United Kingdom
- Branch: Royal Air Force
- Service years: 1939–73
- Rank: Air Marshal
- Commands: Maintenance Command (1970–73); Bomber Command Armament School (1953–55)
- Conflicts: Second World War
- Awards: George Cross; Knight Commander of the Order of the British Empire
- Other work: Assistant Principal Sheffield Polytechnic; Consultant Civil Aviation Administration; Life Vice-President Air Crew Association

Air Marshal Sir John Rowlands, GC, KBE (23 September 1915 – 4 June 2006) was a senior Royal Air Force commander and a recipient of the George Cross for his work in bomb disposal during the Second World War. He later worked in the development of Britain's nuclear weapons programme.

== RAF career ==
Rowlands was born in Hawarden, Flintshire and was educated at the local Hawarden Grammar School. He took a degree in physics at the University of Wales, where he captained the university football side and was in the tennis team.

At the outbreak of the Second World War, Rowlands joined the Royal Air Force Volunteer Reserve. After undertaking pilot training at RAF Ternhill and gaining his pilot's wings, he trained in armament engineering at RAF Manby in Lincolnshire. He was promoted to the rank of flying officer in the Technical Branch on 7 October 1940, and to temporary flight lieutenant on 1 December 1941. He was appointed a Member of the Order of the British Empire in 1942.

He received further promotions to acting squadron leader on 2 November 1942, to war-substantive flight lieutenant on 2 April 1943, to war-substantive squadron leader on 13 January 1944 and to acting wing commander on 13 July of the same year.

The citation for his George Cross (GC) declared:

The KING has been graciously pleased to approve the award of the GEORGE CROSS to:

Acting Wing Commander John Samuel Rowlands, M.B.E. (73378), Royal Air Force Volunteer Reserve.

For over 2 years, Wing Commander Rowlands has been employed on bomb disposal duties and has repeatedly displayed the most conspicuous courage and unselfish devotion to duty in circumstances of great personal danger.

He was invested with the GC by King George VI at Buckingham Palace on 20 July 1945.

He was given a permanent commission in the Royal Air Force in September 1945 with the rank of flight lieutenant and attended RAF Staff College in Haifa in 1946. He was subsequently promoted to squadron leader, dated 3 December 1946 but back-dated to January 1945.

Promoted to wing commander in January 1952, Rowlands was posted to head an RAF team at the Atomic Warfare Research Establishment to participate in the development of the British atomic bomb. In 1957 he was made senior RAF advisor for the development of the H-bomb, and was promoted to group captain in January 1958.

He became a Staff Officer on the British Defence Staff at Washington D. C. in 1961, and was promoted to air commodore on 1 July 1963. He became the Assistant Commandant (Technical) at the RAF College Cranwell in 1965. On 4 June 1968, he was appointed Director-General of Ground Training, with the acting rank of air vice marshal, made substantive on 1 July. He was promoted to air marshal and appointed Air Officer Commanding Maintenance Command on 13 April 1970, where he remained until he retired in July 1973.

He was appointed an Officer of the Order of the British Empire in 1954, and knighted as a Knight Commander of the Order of the British Empire in 1971.

On retirement from the RAF, he briefly became an administrator at Queen Mary College, University of London and then, from 1974 to 1980, assistant principal of Sheffield Polytechnic. He died at Thornbury Hospital, Sheffield on 4 June 2006, aged 90. He died a few weeks before he and others were honoured at a special service at Westminster Abbey for recipients of the Victoria Cross and George Cross.

Military offices
Preceded by Sir Kenneth Porter	Air Officer Commanding-in-Chief Maintenance Command; 1970–1973	Succeeded by Sir Reginald Harland
