= Holy Cross College (UK) =

Coeducational Roman Catholic Sixth Form College in Bury, Greater Manchester

Holy Cross College & University Centre
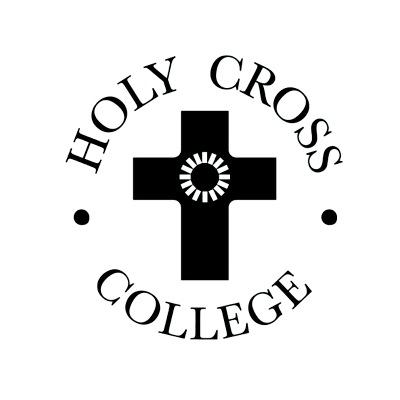

Location
- Manchester Road; Bury, Greater Manchester, BL9 9BB; England; 53.5848°N 2.2991°W

Information
- Type: Further Education College
- Religious affiliation: Roman Catholic
- Established: 1878 (renamed 1979)
- Founder: Daughters of the Cross of Liège
- Local authority: Bury
- Department for Education URN: 130499 Tables
- Ofsted: Reports
- Principal: Carina Vitti
- Gender: Mixed
- Age: 16 to 19
- Enrolment: c. 2,000
- Affiliations: Maple Group
- Former pupils: Old Crucians
- Website: www.holycross.ac.uk

Holy Cross College is a coeducational Roman Catholic sixth form college in Bury, Greater Manchester, England. Originally a single-sex school, it was founded by religious sisters in 1878 and later became Bury Convent Grammar School. When the college adopted its current name in 1979, it also opened up to male students. It became a University Centre in 1999.

As of 2020, the college has around 2000 sixth form students and 600 undergraduate students. It received the rating 'Good' in its Ofsted inspection of March 2024.

== History ==
The college was founded in 1878 by the Daughters of the Cross of Liège, a Catholic female religious order. It was originally opened as a small private school, and was expanded by the order in 1905 to become a larger girls' convent grammar school, changing its name to Bury Convent Grammar School.

In 1979, the school became a coeducational sixth form college and adopted its present name, Holy Cross College. It became a University Centre in 1999.

== Courses and qualifications ==
Holy Cross College offers A Levels in a variety of subjects, vocational BTEC and CTEC diplomas, PGCEs (Postgraduate Certificate in Education), undergraduate, masters and foundation degrees in the field of education, and GCSEs.

== Partnerships ==
The college has close educational links with Heidelberg College in Tiffin, Ohio. It is also a member of the Maple Group, a partnership created in 2013 between some of country's leading sixth form colleges.

== Academic performance ==
In 2023, the overall A Level pass rate was 96%. For students who completed 16-18 study at the college in 2021, 66% stayed in education, 5% entered apprenticeships and 17% entered employment, while 11% were unemployed or unknown. In 2020, 79% went on to a degree and a quarter of those went to Russel Group universities.

Holy Cross College was previously ranked one of the top ten sixth form colleges in the United Kingdom, being placed eighth on the list in 2007 and second in 2008.

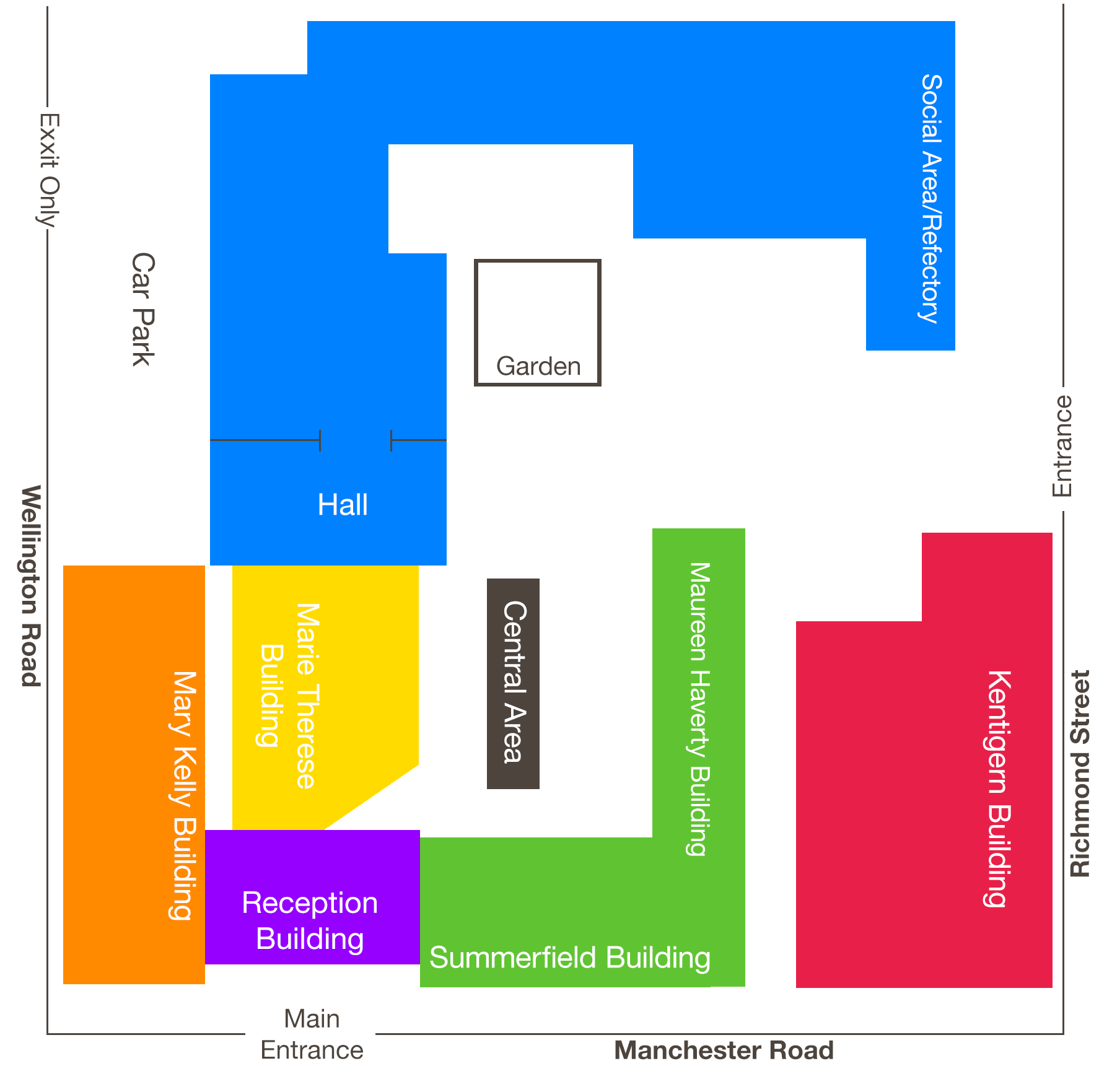
College Campus Map

== Campus buildings and facilities ==
The college is made up of several buildings on one campus:

- The Kentigern Building, containing teaching and learning facilities for different subject areas as well as the new College Chapel
- The Maureen Haverty Building, which houses the Art and Design Department
- The campus café, for use by staff and students
- The College Library, which also contains an astronomical observatory

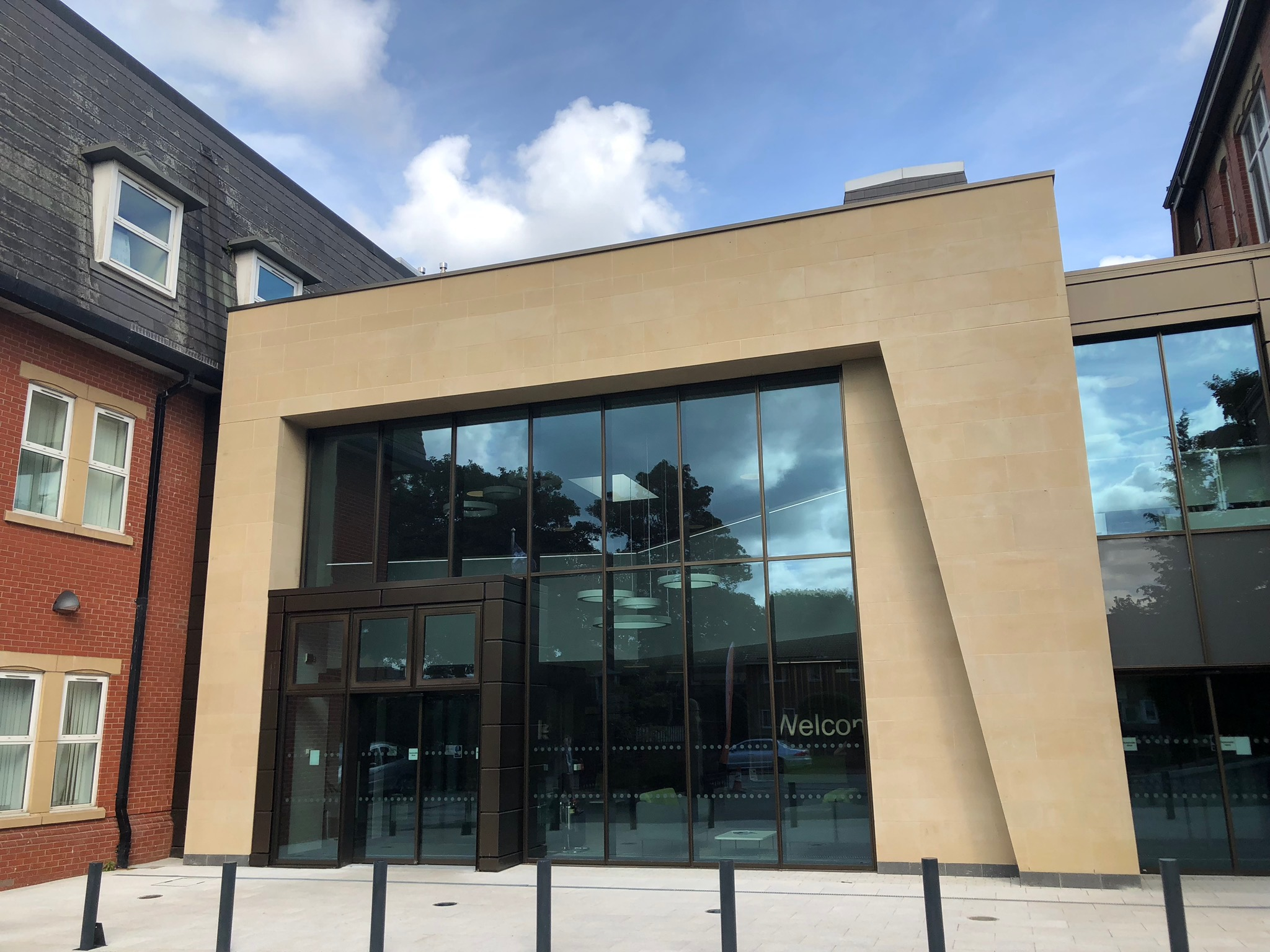
College Reception Building

== Notable alumni ==
- Samuel Brooksworth - Businessman.
- Anna Friel - actress (Brookside, Pushing Daisies).
