= Kenneth Porter (RAF officer) =

Royal Air Force Air Marshal (1912-2003)

Sir Kenneth Porter
- Born: 12 November 1912
- Died: 28 March 2003 (aged 90)
- Military career
- Allegiance: United Kingdom
- Branch: Royal Air Force
- Service years: 1928–70
- Rank: Air Marshal
- Commands: Maintenance Command (1966–70); RAF St Athan (1960–61); No. 4 School of Technical Training (1960–61); RAF Swanton Morley (1953–54); No. 2 Air Signallers School (1952–53)
- Conflicts: Second World War
- Awards: Knight Commander of the Order of the Bath; Commander of the Order of the British Empire; Mentioned in Despatches (3); Officer of the Legion of Merit (United States)

Air Marshal Sir Melvin Kenneth Drowley Porter, KCB, CBE (12 November 1912 – 28 March 2003) was a senior Royal Air Force officer who served as Air Officer Commanding-in-Chief Maintenance Command from 1966 until his retirement in 1970.

== RAF career ==
Porter joined the Royal Air Force in 1928. He was appointed Chief Signals Officer at Headquarters RAF Balloon Command in 1939 and served in the Second World War as Chief Signals Officer at No. 11 Group, then No. 83 Group followed by Second Tactical Air Force just when air support was needed for the Normandy landings.

After the war he joined the Directing Staff at the RAF Staff College, Andover and then, from 1950, became Senior Technical Staff Officer at Headquarters No. 205 Group. He went on to be Officer Commanding at No. 2 Air Signallers School in 1952 and Officer Commanding at No. 1 Air Signallers School in 1953 before returning to the role of Chief Signals Officer at Headquarters Second Tactical Air Force in 1954. He became Chief Signals Officer at Headquarters Fighter Command in 1955, Commandant at No. 4 School of Technical Training in 1959 and Director General of Ground Training at the Ministry of Defence in 1961. His last appointments were as Director-General of Signals (Air) at the Ministry of Defence in 1963 and as Air Officer Commanding Maintenance Command in 1966 before retiring in 1970.

In retirement he became Director of Technical Education Projects at University College, Cardiff.

== Family ==
In 1940 he married Elena Sinclair: they had two sons and one daughter.

Military offices
Preceded by Colin Stewart	Director General of Signals; 1963–1966	Unknown
Preceded by Sir Norman Coslett	Air Officer Commanding-in-Chief Maintenance Command; 1966–1970	Succeeded by Sir John Rowlands
