= Leslie Harvey (RAF officer) =

Royal Air Force Air Marshal (1896-1972)

Sir Leslie Harvey
- Born: 11 April 1896
- Died: 14 October 1972 (aged 76)
- Military career
- Allegiance: United Kingdom
- Branch: British Army (1917–18); Royal Air Force (1918–56)
- Service years: 1917–56
- Rank: Air Marshal
- Commands: Maintenance Command (1952–56); No. 24 (Training) Group (1948–49)
- Conflicts: First World War; Second World War
- Awards: Knight Commander of the Order of the British Empire; Companion of the Order of the Bath; Mentioned in Despatches

Air Marshal Sir Leslie Gordon Harvey, KBE, CB (11 April 1896 – 14 October 1972) was a senior Royal Air Force officer who served as Air Officer Commanding-in-Chief Maintenance Command from 1952 until his retirement in 1956.

== RAF career ==
Harvey was commissioned as an officer in the Royal Warwickshire Regiment in June 1917, transferred to the Royal Flying Corps later that year and then secured a short service in the Royal Air Force in 1919. He was promoted to flight lieutenant in 1924. He served in the Second World War as Assistant Director of Repair and Servicing and then as Chief Engineer Officer at Headquarters No. 45 Group before becoming Deputy Air Officer Administration (Maintenance) at Headquarters Transport Command.

After the War he was appointed Air Officer Commanding, No. 24 (Training) Group in 1948, Senior Air Staff Officer at Headquarters RAF Technical Training Command in 1950 and Air Officer Commanding-in-Chief Maintenance Command in 1952 before he retired in 1956.

In retirement he became a Director of GQ Parachute Company.

Military offices
Preceded by Sir Thomas Warne-Browne	Air Officer Commanding-in-Chief Maintenance Command; 1952–1956	Succeeded by Sir Richard Jordan
