= Bury Golf Club =

Golf club in Unsworth, Bury

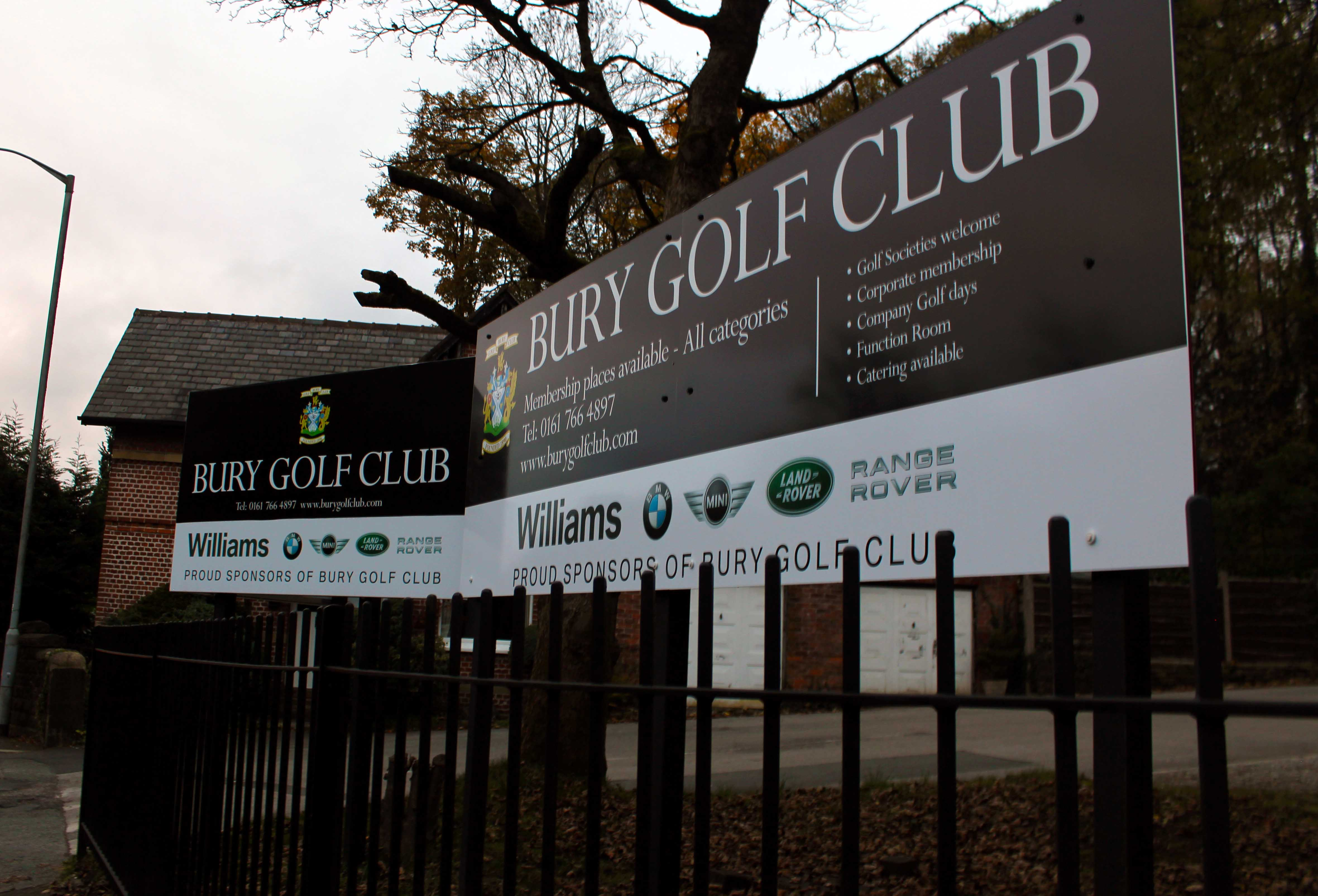
- Bury Golf Club

- Location within Greater Manchester
- 53.565149°N 2.288909°W

Club information
- Location: Unsworth Hall, Unsworth, BL9 9TJ, England
- Established: 1890
- Type: Private
- Owner: Bury Golf Club Ltd.
- Tota holes: 18
- Website: https://www.burygolfclub.com/
- Designed by: Alister MacKenzie, Charles Hugh Alison, Harry Shapland Colt
- Par: 70
- Length: 5,909 yards

Bury Golf Club, is a private golf course and club in Unsworth, Bury, designed by Alister MacKenzie, Charles Hugh Alison, and Harry Shapland Colt. The club was originally located at a course in Redvales, Bury, before moving to its current Unsworth location in 1922. The current course is eighteen-holes in length, and sits east of the clubhouse at Unsworth Hall. Notable players include Harry Vardon, Henry James, Sandy Herd, and Alister MacKenzie.

== History ==
=== Redvales (1890-1918) ===
Bury Golf Club is one of the oldest in its district. The club was instituted in 1890, just before the late 19th century's golf boom, and was attached to a nine-hole course in Redvales, Bury (sometimes referred to as Redvales Links). Harry Vardon was the professional at the Redvales site for three years, and was the club's first professional, before leaving in 1896 for Ganton Golf Club. According to Spalding's Official Golf Guide, it was at Bury that he adopted the "Vardon Grip", a popular grip used by many today. Sandy Herd also played on the Redvales course during this time.

On the character of the course, then captain, S. F. Butcher in 1892 writes:

"The Green is at Redvales, about one mile from Bury. It consists of nine-holes over grassland. Hazards: hedges, roads, and boggy land. Hitherto only a winter course, it is now open in summer also."

Harry Vardon, both club professional and greenskeeper at the time, wrote the following in 1893:

"The course is of the unusual inland character, being mainly meadow land, and the hazards are hedges, roads, and a few artificial sand bunkers. It is situated about one mile from the Bury Station [...], about twenty minutes by rail from Manchester."

In 1904, the club first presented a plan to extend the Redvales course by a further nine holes to create an eighteen-hole course, in 1907 funding was secured, and the work began. The new eighteen-hole course was formally opened on 19 September 1908.

During its time at Redvales, the club hosted regular monthly medal competitions in both seasons, an annual Boxing Day tournament, ladies' day competitions, the Kay Gold Medal, the St. Anne Cup, and the Schofield Gold Challenge Medal (awarded by A. B. Schofield). Also, there was the Sir Henry James Challenge Cup (also referred to as the James Challenge Cup), which was awarded by Henry James, 1st Baron James of Hereford, who was the club's president during the 1890s.

During the First World War, the Redvales course was commandeered to support agricultural food production. The club gave the course up for ploughing in January 1918, and so the club closed down for the remainder of war. The club remained out of operation until after the war had ended, when it then began searching for a new home.

=== Unsworth (1920-present) ===
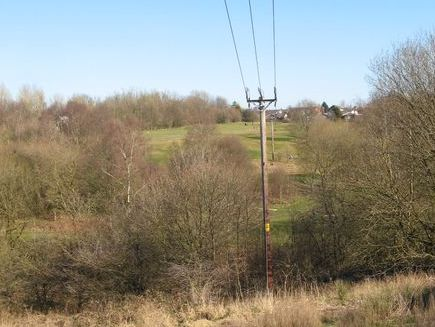
Looking over the golf course towards Unsworth Pole.

In 1920, the club acquired the building and land surrounding Unsworth Lodge with money collected from donations, renaming Unsworth Lodge to Unsworth Hall. The hall, an early 19th century Georgian mansion, was formerly occupied by the first mayor of Bury, Alderman John Duckworth. Since its purchase by the club, the building has been refurbished, and then extended some time around the 1950s, and is currently on Bury Council's list of buildings of special architectural or historic interest as a non-designated heritage asset, due to its landmark status and ties to the first mayor.

The club commissioned golf course architects Colt, Mackenzie and Alison to design a new 18-hole course for the new location. The Unsworth site was chosen due to its proximity to both Bury and Manchester, and its moorland terrain. The construction took place through the course of 1920-1922, with the first of the nine links opening in 1921, and the rest fully operational by 1922. The club continues to operate from the Unsworth course to date.

Before its centenary in 1990, the Earl of Derby became the club's patron, providing the club with a trophy.

== Facilities ==
=== Course ===
The 18-hole semi-moorland course is around 6,000 yards, and contains some classic holes including three designed with McKenzie two-tier greens. The course contains diversified natural features and undulating contours; no two holes are alike, nor are there many which lie in the same direction, providing a varied and fair testing round. Parr Brook meanders through the lower terrain, though pathways and bridges have been constructed to allow the use of buggies in the main season.

=== Clubhouse ===
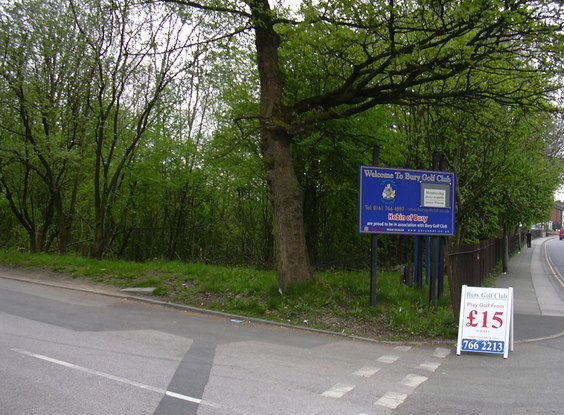
Bury Golf Course entrance on Blackford Bridge.

The present clubhouse, located at Unsworth Hall, contains a licensed bar, two lounges, and a dining room named the Vardon Room (in honour of alumnus Harry Vardon). The hall is also licensed to hold events, and contains a commercial kitchen capable of serving up to eighty guests. There is also a pro shop offering equipment, repairs, and facilitating equipment and buggy rentals.

== Scorecard ==
Tee	Rating/Slope	1	2	3	4	5	6	7	8	9	Out	10	11	12	13	14	15	16	17	18	In	Total
Par		3	4	4	4	4	5	4	4	5	37	3	4	4	4	3	4	4	3	4	33	70
SI	Men's	14	2	8	4	16	6	18	12	10		9	3	1	7	13	15	5	17	11
White		165	403	397	416	275	529	331	374	481	3371	196	359	442	392	178	283	380	108	306	2644	6015
Yellow		151	379	382	409	250	483	307	345	446	3152	196	354	442	385	167	270	370	103	268	2555	5707
Par		3	4	4	4	4	4	4	4	5	36	3	4	5	4	3	4	4	3	4	34	70
SI	Women's	17	3	7	1	15	5	11	13	9		10	6	8	2	16	14	4	18	12
Red		368	281	113	388	324	452	381	96	432	2835	299	105	394	408	276	286	176	347	416	2707	5542

== Past Captains ==
Year	Captain	Vice Captain	Lady Captain	Junior Captain
2025	Kevin Speight	Ian Morris	Sue Warrington	Jamie Goldstone
2024	Steve Olive	Kevin Speight	Angela Wilkinson	Lewis Flynn
2023	Graham Cross	Steve Olive	Julie Speight	Jude Brown
2022		Graham Cross		Ollie Richardson

== Competitions ==
As the founding member, the club participates in Bury & District Golf Association (BDGA) organised competitions each year including the Harry Vardon championship trophy, the first of which being held at Bury Golf Club on 21 May 1938. The original silver trophy was stolen from the clubhouse in 1968, after which a new and more modest trophy has been used. Participating golf clubs include: Breightmet; Bury; Greenmount; Harwood; Lowes Park; Pike Fold; Rossendale; and Walmersley.

The club is also one of nine members of the North West Manchester Golf Association (NWMGA), having joined in 2016. Each year the association hosts competitions between clubs, contributing to a league table. In the most recent competition in 2019, Bury finished fourth in the league.

In addition to the district competitions, the club hosts several of its own internal and open competitions, in both seasons.
