= Redvales =

Coordinates: 53.5771°N 2.3011°W

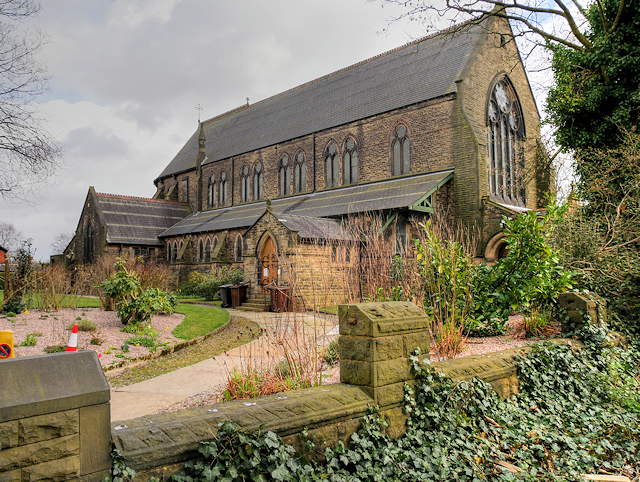
- Saint Peter's Church between Redvales and Fishpool

- Location within Greater Manchester
- Population: 11,483 (2011)
- Metropolitan borough: Bury
- Metropolitan county: Greater Manchester
- Region: North West
- Country: England
- Sovereign state: United Kingdom
- Post town: Bury
- Postcode district: BL9
- Dialling code: 0161
- Police: Greater Manchester
- Fire: Greater Manchester
- Ambulance: North West
- UK Parliament: Bury South

Redvales is a residential district to the south of Bury town centre in Greater Manchester in the United Kingdom. The population of the Bury Ward at the 2011 census was 11,483. Roughly-speaking, the area occupies the area from Manchester Road to the River Irwell, crossed by Radcliffe Road, Redvales Road and Tarn Drive.

== Toponymy ==
The origin of the name 'Redvales' goes back to the 13th century: it was 'Redgifuhalh' meaning a lady living near a river.

== History ==
Bury's first workhouse, also known as the Redvales workhouse, was built in 1775 to the south of the town on Manchester Road. From 1890-1918, Redvales was home to Bury Golf Club, where Harry Vardon was professional and greenskeeper, until 1918 when the land was commandeered to support agricultural food production, after which the club moved to nearby Unsworth.

== Landmarks ==
St Peter's Primary School, with Derby High School on its fringes. There are shops on Radcliffe Road and Redvales Road. The Warth Mill was once a major employer for the area, but has since declined. The Warth Mill is situated on the Irwell. Donald MacPherson Paint Company were located here until the 1990s. They supplied paint for the Woolworths chain.

Radcliffe Road was built and opened as recently as 1927. There was a ceremony on Warth Bridge with representatives of both Bury, the mayor Councillor John Hill JP, and Radcliffe taking part.

== Housing ==
Most of Redvales is built up with semi-detached housing, on Kendal Drive, Derwent Drive, Keswick Drive and Radcliffe Road with other main thoroughfares being Cardigan Drive, Brecon Drive, Warth Road, Ribchester Drive and Whitefield Road. There are some traditional mill cottages near to the Irwell. The poorhouse was also situated at Redvales.
