= John Cooke (RAF officer) =

British doctor and senior Royal Air force officer

- Born: 16 January 1922; Pembroke, Pembrokeshire, Wales
- Died: 25 April 2011 (aged 89)
- Spouse: Elizabeth Helena Murray Johnstone (m. 1958)
- Children: 3
- Relatives: Air Marshal Sir Cyril Cooke (father)
- Military career
- Allegiance: United Kingdom
- Branch: United Kingdom
- Service years: 1945–85
- Rank: Air Vice-Marshal
- Service number: 201232
- Conflicts: Second World War; Aden Emergency
- Awards: Companion of the Order of the Bath; Officer of the Order of the British Empire; Commander of the Order of St John
- Other work: Medical advisor Consultant physician

Air Vice-Marshal John Nigel Carlyle Cooke, CB, OBE, CStJ (16 January 1922 – 25 April 2011) was a British doctor and senior Royal Air force officer. He served as Dean of Air Force Medicine from 1979 to 1983, and Senior Consultant RAF from 1983 to 1985. He was also a medical advisor to the European Space Agency, the Royal Air Force of Oman and the Civil Aviation Authority.

== Early life ==
Cooke was born on 16 January 1922 in Pembroke, Wales. The son of Cyril Cooke, he spent his early childhood in the North West Frontier Province, India. He was educated at Felsted School, a private school in Felsted, Essex. He studied medicine at St Mary's Hospital Medical School, London. In addition to his studies, he drove ambulances during The Blitz and worked under Alexander Fleming researching penicillin. He graduated Bachelor of Medicine, Bachelor of Surgery (MB BS) in 1945.

== Military career ==
On 1 November 1945, Cooke was commissioned into the Medical Branch, Royal Air Force, as a flying officer (emergency). He was given the service number 201232. His first posting was to the Mass Miniature Radiology Unit at the Central Medical Establishment. There, he gained experience of tuberculosis and became an accomplished radiologist. On 1 November 1946, he was promoted to flight lieutenant (war substantive).

In June 1947, he was granted a permanent commission dated to 1 July 1946 with the rank of flying officer. In September 1947, he was promoted once more to flight lieutenant. This was back-dated to 1 November 1946, the date when he was first promoted to that rank, and he was given seniority from 1 May 1946. He went on to serve successively in all the UK based RAF hospitals.

On 10 October 1950, he was granted seniority in the rank of flight lieutenant from 1 May 1944. On 1 May 1951, he was promoted to squadron leader.

In 1952, he was appointed officer in charge of the medical division at RAF Hospital Cosford. In 1954, he was posted to the new RAF hospital in Wegberg, Germany. He was issued with a Volkswagen Beetle so he could provide cover for other hospitals in the region.

By the middle of 1956, he was an acting wing commander. In 1957, he returned to the UK and was posted once again to RAF Cosford. He was promoted to wing commander on 1 May 1958. Having been granted study leave, he joined St George's Hospital, London, as a senior registrar under Sir Ken Robson.

In 1963, during the Aden Emergency, he was posted to Aden, Yemen. During the posting he became experienced in tropical medicine and he developed a technique of re-hydrating babies with severe fluid loss due to diarrhoea. He was also involved in successful trials relating to the armouring of Land Rovers against land mines.

On 1 May 1966, he was promoted to group captain. He was then posted to RAF Hospital Wroughton, where he developed an interest in metabolic medicine.

He published two articles in The Lancet in 1967; one on the relationship between calcium and sodium excretion and the management of kidney stones, and the other on topical steroids causing the suppression of the adrenal glands.

In 1969, he returned to Germany as the physician-in-charge of RAF Hospital Wegberg where he established an intensive care unit. In 1972, he was posted to RAF Halton as commander of the medical division at Princess Mary’s RAF Hospital.

He remained at RAF Halton for the rest of his career, during which he held a number of senior positions in the Medical Branch. He served as Whittingham Professor of Aviation Medicine from 1974 to 1979. As part of the half-yearly promotions, on 1 January 1975, he was promoted to air commodore.

In addition to his RAF postings, he was a member of the medical advisory board of the European Space Agency from 1978 to 1984. On 1 September 1979, he was promoted to air vice-marshal.

From 1979 to 1983, he served as Dean of Air Force Medicine. He was also Chair of the Defence Medical Services Postgraduate Council from 1980 to 1982. He served as Senior Consultant RAF from 1983 to 1985.

He retired from the Royal Air Force on 15 June 1985.

== Later life ==
Cooke served as a consultant adviser in medicine to the Royal Air Force of Oman from 1985 to 1991. He was Chair of the Ethics Committee of the RAF Institute of Aviation Medicine from 1987 to 1989. He was a Consultant Physician to the Civil Aviation Authority from the creation of its medical advisory panel in the late 1970s until 2003.

He died on 25 April 2011 after a short illness. His Humanist funeral was held on 7 May 2011 and he was buried in the Greenacres Chilterns Burial Park, Beaconsfield.

== Personal life ==
In 1958, Cooke married Elizabeth Helena Murray Johnstone. They met while he was working at St George's Hospital, London.

Together they had three children; two sons, Nigel and Iain, and one daughter, Faith.

Elizabeth died in 2021.

== Honours and decorations ==
In the 1956 Birthday Honours, Cooke was appointed an Officer of the Order of the British Empire. On 29 May 1979, he was appointed Honorary Physician to the Queen (QHP), and relinquished the appointment on 15 June 1985. He was appointed a Commander of the Order of St. John in April 1983. In the 1984 Queen's Birthday Honours, he was appointed a Companion of the Order of the Bath.
