= John Bradley (RAF officer) =

Royal Air Force Air Marshal (1888-1982)

Sir John Bradley
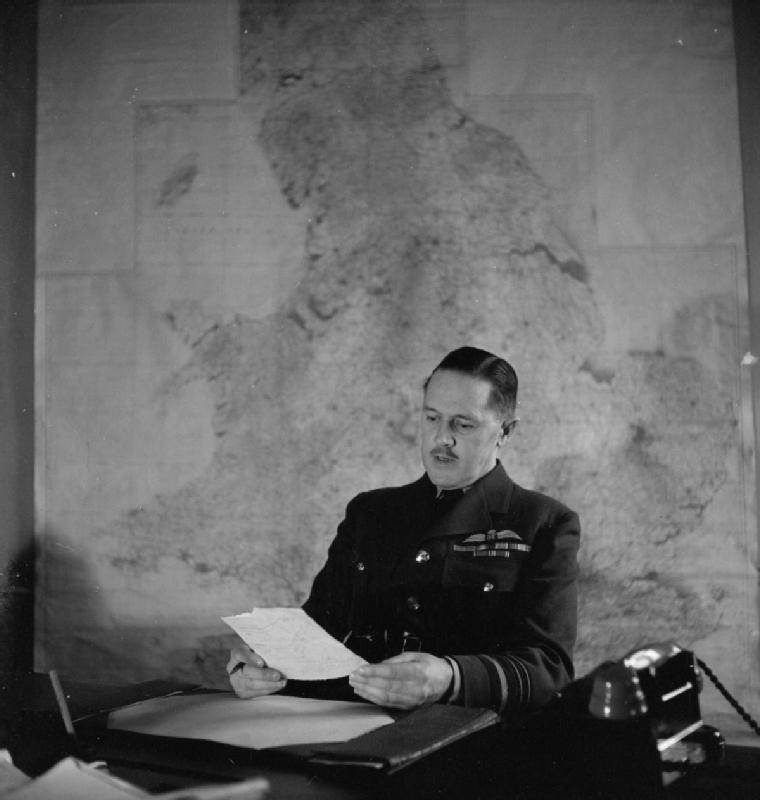
- Air Marshal J S T Bradley
- Born: 11 April 1888; Cork, Ireland
- Died: 6 January 1982 (aged 93)
- Military career
- Allegiance: United Kingdom
- Branch: British Army (1914–1918); Royal Air Force (1918–1945)
- Service years: 1914–1945
- Rank: Air Marshal
- Commands: Maintenance Command (1938–1942); RAF Northolt (1930–1931); No. 14 Squadron (1921–1924)
- Conflicts: World War I World War II
- Awards: Knight Commander of the Order of the Bath; Commander of the Order of the British Empire; Mentioned in Despatches; Commander's Cross with Star of the Order of Polonia Restituta (Poland)

Air Marshal Sir John Stanley Travers Bradley, KCB, CBE (11 April 1888 – 6 January 1982) was a senior Royal Air Force officer who became Air Officer Commanding-in-Chief RAF Maintenance Command.

== RAF career ==
Bradley served with the East Yorkshire Regiment and then the Machine Gun Corps during the First World War, transferring to the Royal Air Force in August 1918. He was appointed Officer Commanding No. 14 Squadron in 1921 and Station Commander at RAF Northolt in 1930. Promoted to group captain in July 1931, Bradley went on to be Senior Air Staff Officer at Headquarters Wessex Bombing Area in November 1931, Director of Equipment at the Air Ministry in 1935, Air Officer Commanding-in-Chief Maintenance Command in 1938. He continued in that role during the Second World War, though he moved on to be Deputy Air Member for Supply & Organisation in 1942 before retiring at the end of the war.

Military offices
Preceded by New post	Air Officer Commanding-in-Chief Maintenance Command; 1938–1942	Succeeded by Sir Grahame Donald
