= Albert Broome =

English footballer

Albert Henry Broome (30 May 1900 – December 1989) was an English footballer. His regular position was as a forward. He was born in Unsworth, Bury, Lancashire. He played for Oldham Athletic and Manchester United.
