= No. 41 Group RAF =

Former Royal Air Force operations group

No. 41 (Maintenance) Group RAF
- Royal Air Force Ensign
- Active: 1 January 1939 – 21 July 1961
- Country: United Kingdom
- Branch: Royal Air Force
- Type: Royal Air Force group
- Part of: RAF Maintenance Command

No. 41 Group RAF is a former Royal Air Force Maintenance group that was operational from 1 January 1939, throughout the Second World War and into the Cold War until 21 July 1961 within RAF Maintenance Command that dealt with aircraft.

== Structure ==
November 1939 – HQ at Andover

- 5, 6, 8, 9, 10, 12, 19, 20, 22, 24, 27 & No. 36 Maintenance Unit RAF

April 1942 – HQ at Andover

- 5, 6, 8, 9, 10, 12, 15, 18, 22, 23, 24, 19, 20, 27, 29, 33, 37, 38, 39, 45, 46, 44, 48, No. 51 Maintenance Unit RAF
- RAF Dumfries = No. 11 (Service) Ferry Pilots Pool RAF
- RAF Hamble = No. 15 Ferry Pilots Pool ATA
- RAF Hatfield = No. 5 Ferry Pilots Pool ATA
- RAF Hawarden = No. 3 Ferry Pilots Pool ATA
- RAF Hullavington = No. 8 (Service) Ferry Pilots Pool RAF
- RAF Kington Langley = No. 10 (Polish) Ferry Flight RAF
- RAF Prestwick = No. 4 Ferry Pilots Pool ATA
- RAF Ratcliffe = No. 6 Ferry Pilots Pool ATA
- RAF Ringway = No. 14 Ferry Pilots Pool ATA
- RAF Thruxton = No. 1427 (Ferry Training) Flight RAF
- Bristol (Whitchurch) Airport = No. 2 Ferry Pilots Pool ATA
- RAF White Waltham = No. 1 Ferry Pilots Pool ATA

April 1943 – HQ at Andover

- 6, 8, 9, 10, 12, 15, 18, 19, 20, 22, 23, 27, 29, 33, 38, 39, 44, 45, 46, 48 & No. 51 Maintenance Unit RAF
- RAF Dumfries = No. 11 (Service) Ferry Pilots Pool RAF
- RAF Hamble = No. 15 Ferry Pilots Pool ATA
- RAF Hatfield = No. 5 Ferry Pilots Pool ATA
- RAF Hawarden = No. 3 Ferry Pilots Pool ATA
- RAF Hullavington = No. 8 (Service) Ferry Pilots Pool RAF
- RAF Kington Langley = No. 10 (Polish) Ferry Flight RAF
- RAF Luton = No. 5 Ferry Pilots Pool ATA
- RAF Marham = No. 1427 (Ferry Training) Flight RAF
- RAF Marston Moor = No. 1475 (Training) Flight RAF
- RAF Prestwick = No. 4 Ferry Pilots Pool ATA
- RAF Ratcliffe = No. 6 Ferry Pilots Pool ATA
- RAF Ringway = No. 14 Ferry Pilots Pool ATA
- Bristol (Whitchurch) Airport = No. 2 Ferry Pilots Pool ATA
- RAF White Waltham = No. 1 Ferry Pilots Pool ATA

July 1944 – HQ at Andover

- 5, 6, 8, 9, 10, 12, 15, 18, 19, 20, 22, 23, 27, 29, 33, 38, 39, 44, 45, 48, 51 & No. 57 Maintenance Unit RAF
- RAF Hamble = No. 15 Ferry Pilots Pool ATA
- RAF Hawarden = No. 3 Ferry Pilots Pool ATA
- RAF Prestwick = No. 4 Ferry Pilots Pool ATA
- RAF Ratcliffe = No. 6 Ferry Pilots Pool ATA
- RAF Ringway = No. 14 Ferry Pilots Pool ATA
- RAF Sydenham = No. 8 Ferry Pilots Pool ATA
- RAF Thame = No. 5 Ferry Pilots Pool ATA
- Bristol (Whitchurch) Airport = No. 2 Ferry Pilots Pool ATA
- RAF White Waltham = No. 1 Ferry Pilots Pool ATA

July 1945 – HQ at Andover

- 5, 6, 8, 9, 10, 12, 15, 18, 19, 20, 22, 23, 27, 29, 33, 38, 39, 44, 45, 46, 48, 51 & No. 57 Maintenance Unit RAF
- RAF Hamble = No. 15 Ferry Pilots Pool ATA
- RAF Hawarden = No. 3 Ferry Pilots Pool ATA
- RAF Prestwick = No. 4 Ferry Pilots Pool ATA
- RAF Ratcliffe = No. 6 Ferry Pilots Pool ATA
- RAF Ringway = No. 14 Ferry Pilots Pool ATA
- RAF Sydenham = No. 8 Ferry Pilots Pool ATA
- RAF Thame = No. 5 Ferry Pilots Pool ATA
- Bristol (Whitchurch) Airport = No. 2 Ferry Pilots Pool ATA
- RAF White Waltham = No. 1 Ferry Pilots Pool ATA

== No. 43 (Maintenance) Group RAF ==
No. 43 (Maintenance) Group RAF was formed on 1 January 1939 at No. 81 Weyhill Road, Andover as a Repair and Salvage group. It was disbanded on 2 January 1956 while at RAF Hucknall and merged into No. 41 Group.

November 1939 - HQ at Andover

- 13, 26, 30, 32, 49, 50, 54, 58, 60 & No. 63 Maintenance Unit RAF

May 1941 - HQ at Oxford

- 1, 4, 13, 26, 30, 32, 34, 49, 50, 54, 56, 60, 63, 65, 67, 71, 75, 83, 86 & No. 90 Maintenance Unit RAF

April 1942 - HQ at Oxford

- 1, 4, 13, 26, 30, 32, 34, 49, 50, 56, 58, 54, 60, 65, 67, 71, 75, 78, 83, 84, 85, 86, 90 & No. 218 Maintenance Unit RAF

April 1943 - HQ at Oxford

- 1, 4, 13, 24, 26, 30, 32, 34, 49, 50, 54, 56, 58, 60, 63, 65, 67, 71, 75, 78, 83, 84, 85, 86, 88, 97, 213, 218, 226 & No. 235 Maintenance Unit RAF

July 1944 - HQ at Oxford
July 1945 - HQ at Stanmore

- No. 43 Group Coummnication Flight RAF at RAF Abingdon
- 1, 4, 13, 24, 26, 30, 32, 34, 49, 50, 54, 56, 58, 60, 63, 65, 67, 71, 75, 78, 83, 84, 85, 86, 88, 97, 213, 218 & No. 226 Maintenance Unit RAF

April 1953 - HQ at Hucknall

- 4, 30, 32, 34, 49, 54, 58, 60, 63, 238 & 278
