= John D'Albiac =

Royal Air Force Air Marshal (1894–1963)

Sir John Henry D'Albiac
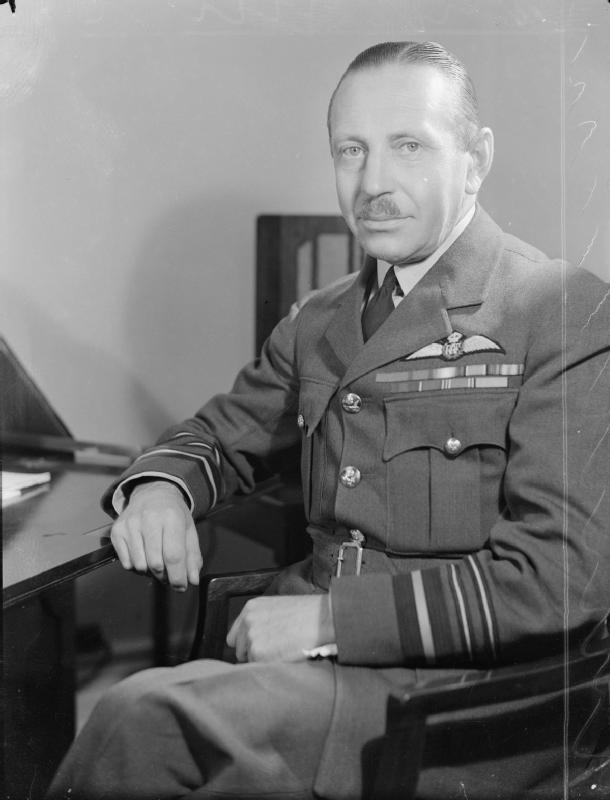
- John D'Albiac as Commander of the Tactical Air Force during the Second World War
- Born: 28 January 1894
- Died: 20 August 1963 (aged 69); Beaconsfield, Buckinghamshire, England
- Military career
- Allegiance: United Kingdom
- Branch: Royal Marines (1914–18); Royal Air Force (1918–47)
- Service years: 1914–47
- Rank: Air Marshal
- Commands: Second Tactical Air Force (1943–44); No. 2 Group (1942–43); No. 222 Group (1942); British Forces in Iraq (1941–42); British Forces in Greece (1940–41); RAF Palestine and Transjordan (1939–40); RAF Scopwick (1918–19)
- Conflicts: First World War; Second World War
- Awards: Knight Commander of the Royal Victorian Order; Knight Commander of the Order of the British Empire; Companion of the Order of the Bath; Distinguished Service Order; Mentioned in Despatches; Grand Commander of the Order of the Phoenix (Greece); Commander of the Legion of Merit (United States); Grand Officer of the Order of Orange-Nassau (Netherlands)
- Other work: Aerodrome Commandant, London Heathrow Airport

Air Marshal Sir John Henry D'Albiac, KCVO, KBE, CB, DSO (28 January 1894 – 20 August 1963) was a Royal Air Force officer. He was a senior commander during the Second World War. Notably he was the British air commander for the Battle of Greece.

== Biography ==
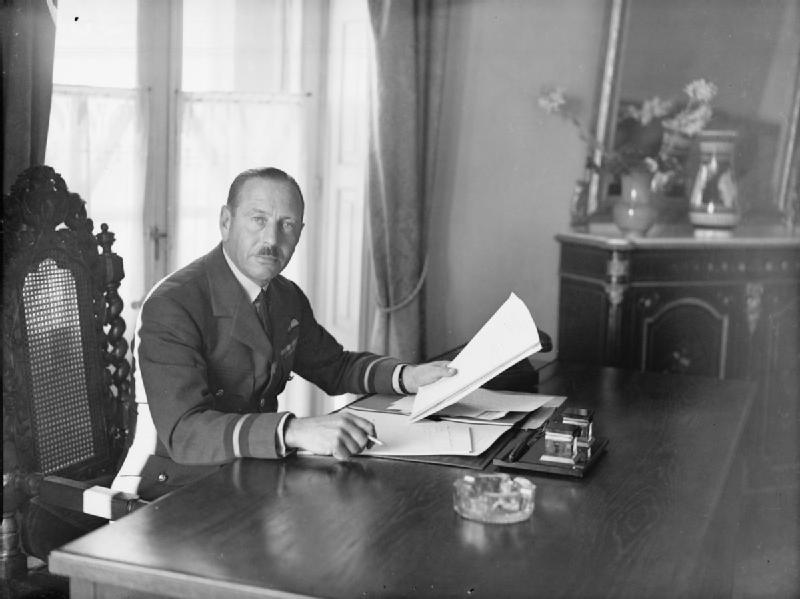
Air Commodore D'Albiac, Air Officer Commanding British Forces in Greece, sitting at his desk in his Headquarters at the Grande Bretagne Hotel, Athens.

D'Albiac was educated at the Seabrook Lodge School in Kent, Framlingham College and the Royal Military College, Sandhurst. He was commissioned into the Royal Marine Artillery in 1914 but seconded to the Royal Naval Air Service during the following year. In 1916, whilst serving in France as an aeroplane observer, D'Albiac was awarded the Distinguished Service Order. After serving as Station Commander at RAF Scopwick he transferred to the RAF on its establishment in 1918 and served on the Staff at Headquarters RAF Trans-Jordania from 1922 and as a Flight Commander in No. 99 Squadron from 1926.

During the Second World War D'Albiac served as Air Officer Commanding RAF Palestine and Transjordan from August 1939, Air Officer Commanding British Forces in Greece from November 1940 before returning to be Air Officer Commanding RAF Palestine and Transjordan from May 1941 again. He continued his war service as Air Officer Commanding British Forces in Iraq from June 1941, Air Officer Commanding No. 222 Group in Ceylon from March 1942 and Air Officer Commanding No. 2 Group in the UK from December 1942. He was then made Air Officer Commanding Second Tactical Air Force in June 1943, Deputy Commander of the Mediterranean Tactical Air Force in February 1944 and the Director-General of Personnel in November 1944. He retired in 1947.

In later life, D'Albiac was the first Aerodrome Commandant at London Heathrow Airport, being appointed in 1946. He was also the Deputy Chairman of the Air Transport Advisory Council. He died in Beaconsfield on 20 August 1963.

== Sources ==
- Churchill, Winston (1950). The Second World War, Volume III, The Grand Alliance. Boston: Houghton Mifflin Company.
- Lyman, Robert (2006). Iraq 1941: The Battles for Basra, Habbaniya, Fallujah and Baghdad. Campaign. Oxford, New York: Osprey Publishing. pp. 96. ISBN 1-84176-991-6.

Military offices
New title Formation established	Commander Second Tactical Air Force; 1943–1944	Succeeded by Sir Arthur Coningham
Preceded by Alan Lees	Air Officer Commanding No. 2 Group; 1942–1943	Succeeded by Basil Embry
Preceded by Harry Smart	Air Officer Commanding British Forces in Iraq; 1941–1942	Succeeded by Hugh Champion de Crespigny; As AOC AHQ Iraq
