= Robert Foster (RAF officer) =

Royal Air Force Air Chief Marshal (1898–1973)

Sir Robert Mordaunt Foster
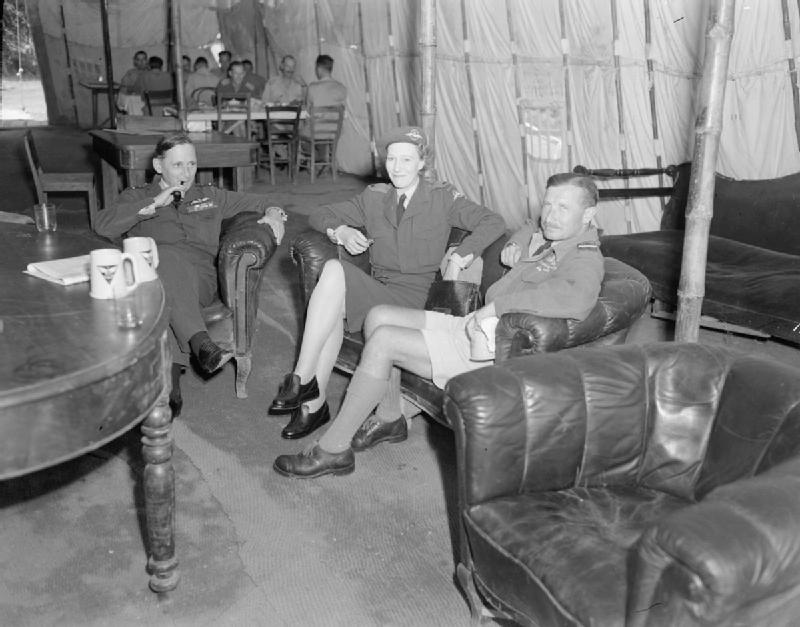
- Air Marshal Sir Arthur Tedder (left), Lady Tedder, and Air Vice Marshal Foster in the Officers' Mess of No. 8 Wing SAAF at Campoformido, Udine, Italy.
- Born: 3 September 1898; Richmond, Surrey, England
- Died: 23 October 1973 (aged 75); Suffolk, England
- Military career
- Allegiance: United Kingdom
- Branch: British Army (1914–18); Royal Air Force (1918–54)
- Service years: 1914–54
- Rank: Air Chief Marshal
- Commands: Second Tactical Air Force (1951–53); Home Command (1949–51); No. 3 Group (1946–47); RAF Italy (1946); RAF Austria (1945–46); Desert Air Force (1944–45); RAF Malta (1944); No. 213 Group (1942–43); No. 214 Group (1942); RAF Wyton (1940–41); No. 110 Squadron (1939–40); No. 15 Squadron (1933–35)
- Conflicts: First World War; Second World War
- Awards: Knight Commander of the Order of the Bath; Commander of the Order of the British Empire; Distinguished Flying Cross; Mentioned in Despatches (5); Commander of the Legion of Merit (United States)
- Other work: Deputy Lieutenant of Suffolk

Air Chief Marshal Sir Robert Mordaunt Foster, KCB, CBE, DFC, DL (3 September 1898 – 23 October 1973) was a Royal Flying Corps pilot in the First World War, and a senior commander in the Royal Air Force during the Second World War and the immediate post-war years.

== Early life and First World War ==
Foster was educated at Winchester College and the Royal Military College at Sandhurst, graduating as a Gentlemen Cadet. He was commissioned as a second lieutenant in the Royal Fusiliers on 19 July 1916, but was seconded to the Royal Flying Corps, and on 7 October 1916 was appointed a flying officer. He was sent to France to join No. 54 Squadron flying the Sopwith Camel. While with 54 Squadron, Foster shot down at least one enemy machine. Later in the war Foster returned to Great Britain, carrying out home defence duties whilst serving with No. 44 Squadron. On 19 January 1918 he was promoted to lieutenant. In April 1918, Foster returned to France, serving as a flight commander with the rank of temporary captain from 15 May, in No. 209 Squadron where he claimed three shared enemy aircraft captured, nine shared enemy aircraft destroyed, and four shared enemy aircraft 'out of control', giving a total of 16.

On 2 August 1918 Foster was awarded the Distinguished Flying Cross, his citation reading:

Lieutenant (Temporary Captain) Robert Mordaunt Foster. This officer has taken part in numerous combats and led his patrols brilliantly; he has destroyed five hostile machines. On one occasion he attacked two biplanes single-handed; one he forced down and the other burst into flames and broke up in the air.

== Inter-war years ==
On 1 August 1919 Foster was granted a permanent commission in the Royal Air Force with the rank of lieutenant, resigning his commission in the Royal Fusiliers the same day. In late 1919 he was posted to India where he joined No. 20 Squadron as a pilot. On one occasion during his nearly four years in India, after suffering an aircraft fire, Foster and his observer had to make a forced landing and they were subsequently captured and held for three weeks before being released.

On 1 January 1924 he was promoted from flying officer to flight lieutenant.

In May 1925 Foster attended the RAF Staff College and the following year he spent several months at the School of Oriental Studies in London. After this period of study, Foster spent the remainder of the 1920s carrying out intelligence duties at the headquarters of RAF Iraq Command.

From 1930 Foster once again served as a pilot, this time with No. 70 Squadron. After promotion to squadron leader in December 1932, Foster took up the post of Officer Commanding No. 15 Squadron the next year. In 1935, Foster returned to Iraq, serving on the air staff at the British Forces headquarters where he received promotion to wing commander on 1 July 1937. His last tour before the outbreak of the Second World War was in the Deputy Directorate of Plans on the Air Staff.

== Second World War ==
Only days after war was declared, Foster was posted as the Senior Personnel Officer at the headquarters of No. 2 Group. Late 1939 saw Foster appointed Officer Commanding No. 110 Squadron, and in 1940 he was the Station Commander at RAF Wyton.

In January 1942 Foster took up command of No. 214 Group, part of Middle East Command, based at Kirkuk, Iraq, and in November that year he received an acting promotion to air commodore and was posted as Air Officer Commanding (AOC) No. 213 Group based at Aley, Lebanon. From March 1943, Foster was engaged in staff duties at Mediterranean Air Command before being appointed AOC RAF Malta a year later and receiving acting promotion to air vice marshal. Later in 1944 he served as Head of the Air Commission in Italy which effectively granted him command of the Italian Air Force. Foster did not spend long as Head of the Air Commission, being posted as AOC Desert Air Force in North Africa in December.

Following the defeat of the Germany, from August 1945, Foster served on the Allied Commission for Austria as the Chief of the Air Division. Only days later the post became AOC RAF Austria.

== Post-war years ==
In May 1946 Foster returned to Italy as the AOC at the air headquarters of RAF Italy. However, only two months later he was appointed AOC of No. 3 Group of Bomber Command.

From early 1947 to late 1949 Foster was Assistant Chief of the Air Staff (Policy) and he then held the post of Air Officer Commanding-in-Chief Reserve Command. On 1 July 1950 he was promoted to Air Marshal and then, following the renaming of his command, served as Air Officer Commander-in-Chief Home Command.

In October 1951, Foster became Commander-in-Chief of the RAF's Second Tactical Air Force in post-war Germany. He was promoted to Air Chief Marshal on 28 January 1953 and he handed over command to Sir Harry Broadhurst in December that year.

Foster retired from the RAF at his own request on 1 February 1954. He became a Deputy Lieutenant of Suffolk in April 1968, living in Great Glemham until his death on 23 October 1973.

Military offices
Preceded by William Dickson	Air Officer Commanding Desert Air Force; 1944–1945	Succeeded by Colin Falconer
Preceded by Sir Alan Lees	Air Officer Commanding-in-Chief Reserve Command; 1949 –1950	Succeeded by Command renamed Home Command
Preceded by Command previously named Reserve Command	Air Officer Commanding-in-Chief Home Command; 1950 –1951	Succeeded by Sir Ronald Ivelaw-Chapman
Preceded by Sir Thomas Williams; As C-in-C British Air Forces of Occupation	Commander-in-Chief Second Tactical Air Force; 1951–1953	Succeeded by Sir Harry Broadhurst
