= Alan Lees =

Royal Air Force Air Marshal (1895–1973)

Sir Alan Lees
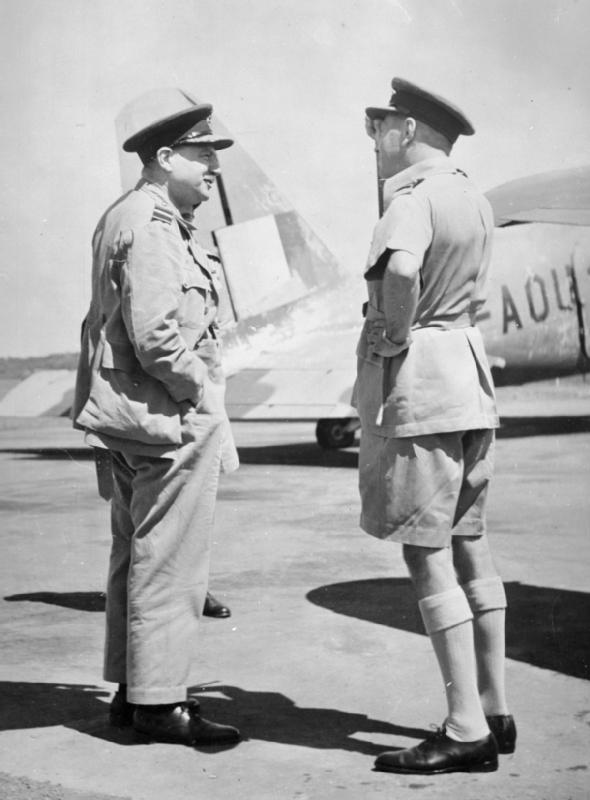
- The new Air Officer Commanding No. 222 Group, Air Vice Marshal Lees (left), is greeted upon arrival at Ratmalana, Ceylon, by his predecessor Air Vice Marshal John D'Albiac, 1942.
- Born: 23 May 1895; Ashton-under-Lyne, Lancashire
- Died: 14 August 1973 (aged 78)
- Military career
- Allegiance: United Kingdom
- Branch: British Army (1914–1918); Royal Air Force (1918–1949)
- Service years: 1914–1949
- Rank: Air Marshal
- Commands: Reserve Command (1946–1949); No. 222 (General Reconnaissance) Group (1942–1944); No. 2 Group (1941–1942); RAF Driffield (1938–1939); No. 1 (Indian Wing) Station (1932–1937); No. 56 Squadron (1928–1930)
- Conflicts: First World War; Second World War
- Awards: Knight Commander of the Order of the Bath; Commander of the Order of the British Empire; Distinguished Service Order; Air Force Cross; Mentioned in Despatches (5); Grand Officer of the Order of Orange-Nassau (Netherlands)

Air Marshal Sir Alan Lees, KCB, CBE, DSO, AFC (23 May 1895 – 14 August 1973) was a Royal Air Force officer who became Air Officer Commanding-in-Chief RAF Reserve Command.

== RAF career ==
Educated at Wellington College and the Royal Military College, Sandhurst, Lees was commissioned into the Royal West Kent Regiment in 1914 at the start of the First World War. He became a pilot in 1915 and while serving on the Western Front was wounded and taken prisoner in 1917. After the War he transferred to the new Royal Air Force and in 1928 became Officer Commanding No. 56 Squadron. He was appointed Officer Commanding No. 1 (Indian Wing) Station in 1932, Station Commander at RAF Driffield in 1938 and then joined the staff at Headquarters RAF Bomber Command in 1939.

He served in the Second World War as Air Officer Commanding No. 2 Group from 1941, Air Officer Commanding No. 222 (General Reconnaissance) Group from 1942 and Air Officer Administration at Headquarters Air Command South East Asia from 1944. After the War he became Air Officer Commanding-in-Chief RAF Reserve Command before retiring in 1949. In that role he introduced a tie and trophy for members of the Air Training Corps.

Military offices
Preceded by Edward Davies	Air Officer Commanding-in-Chief Reserve Command; 1946 –1949	Succeeded by Sir Robert Foster
Preceded by John D'Albiac	Air Officer Commanding No. 222 (General Reconnaissance) Group; 1942–1944	Succeeded by Albert Durston
Preceded by Donald Stevenson	Air Officer Commanding No. 2 Group; 1941–1942	Succeeded by John D'Albiac
