= Graeme Robertson (RAF officer) =

Air Marshal Graeme Robertson CBE
- Born: 22 February 1945 (age 81)
- Military career
- Allegiance: United Kingdom
- Branch: Royal Air Force
- Service years: 1966–98
- Rank: Air Marshal
- Commands: No. 2 Group (1993–94); RAF Wattisham (1985–87); No. 23 Squadron (1984–85); No. 92 Squadron (1982–84)
- Awards: Commander of the Order of the British Empire; Queen's Commendation for Valuable Service in the Air

Air Marshal Graeme Alan Robertson, CBE (born 22 February 1945) is a former Royal Air Force commander who after retirement worked for BAE Systems.

== RAF career ==
Robertson joined the Royal Air Force in 1966. He was appointed Officer Commanding No. 92 Squadron flying Phantoms in West Germany in 1982 and then Officer Commanding No. 23 Squadron flying Phantoms over the Falkland Islands in 1984. He was then made Station Commander at RAF Wattisham in 1985, Director of Air Staff Briefing and Co-ordination at the Ministry of Defence in 1987 and Director of Defence Programmes at the Ministry of Defence in 1990.

He went on to be Deputy Commander of RAF Germany in 1991, Air Officer Commanding No. 2 Group in 1993 and Assistant Chief of Defence Staff (Programmes) at the Ministry of Defence in 1994 before taking up his last appointment as Chief of Staff and Deputy Commander-in-Chief at Strike Command in 1996; he retired in 1998.

== Other roles ==
He became an advisor to BAE Systems in March 1999 and is author of a paper entitled "Developments in UK Aviation" published in 2003.

He served as Clerk to the Honourable Company of Gloucestershire from 2013 to 2018.

Military offices
Recreated Title last held by Sydney Ubee in 1958	Air Office Commanding No. 2 Group; 1994–1995	Succeeded by Roderick Goodall
Preceded by Sir John Allison	Deputy Commander-in-Chief Strike Command; 1996–1998	Succeeded by Sir Timothy Jenner
