= Air Training Corps =

British volunteer youth organisation, primarily focussing on military aviation

- Corps badge
- Active: 1941 – present
- Country: United Kingdom
- Branch: Royal Air Force (sponsor)
- Type: Volunteer youth organisation
- Role: Youth development; military aviation education and training
- Size: 952 squadrons; 34,070 cadets; 9,190 adult volunteers
- Part of: Royal Air Force Air Cadets
- Headquarters: RAF Cranwell
- Nickname: ATC
- Patron: The Princess of Wales
- Motto: Venture Adventure
- March: The Air Cadets March
- Anniversaries: ATC Sunday (First Sunday of February, celebrating the formation of the ATC)
- Website: raf.mod.uk/aircadets

Commanders
- Commandant Air Cadets: Air Commodore Allen Lewis
- Warrant Officer RAFAC: Warrant Officer Alex Corbin
- Honorary Ambassador: Wing Commander Emma Wolstenholme
- Air Commodore-in-Chief: The Princess of Wales
- National Chair: Mr S.J. Ensor
- National Chaplain: Reverend Gareth Jones

Insignia
- Ensign

Aircraft flown
- Trainer: Tutor T1; Viking T1

The Air Training Corps (ATC) is a British volunteer youth organisation; aligned to, and fostering the knowledge and learning of military values, primarily focusing on military aviation. Part of the Royal Air Force Air Cadets (RAFAC), the ATC is sponsored by the Royal Air Force (RAF) and the wider Ministry of Defence (MoD). The majority of Air Training Corps staff are volunteers, though some staff are paid for full-time work; including Commandant RAF Air Cadets, who is a Royal Air Force officer as part of a Full Term Reserve Service commitment. In addition to the Commandant, who is responsible for the organisation's uniformed activities, RAFAC also has a National Chair, who serves as the senior representative of the trustee pillar; the current incumbent is Mr Stuart Ensor OBE.

Members of the Air Training Corps are known as Air Cadets, which is often interchanged with the term 'ATC cadets'. Although many ATC cadets subsequently go on to join the Royal Air Force, or the other branches of the British Armed Forces (or have the desire to do so), the ATC is not a recruiting organisation for its parent service (the Royal Air Force).

Activities undertaken by the Air Training Corps include sport, adventure training (such as walking and paddle-sports), ceremonial drill, rifle shooting, fieldcraft, air experience flights in both powered aircraft and sail-plane gliders, and other outdoor activities, as well as educational classification training. Week-long trips, or 'camps' to RAF stations, along with other camps offering adventure training or music, allow the opportunity for cadets to gain a taste of military life, and often some flying experience in RAF gliders and RAF training aircraft such as the Grob G 115, an aerobatic-capable elementary flying training aircraft, known in UK military service as the Tutor T1. The Viking T1 glider is used to train cadets on gliding the manufacturer name for the Viking T1 is the Grob G103a Twin II, manufactured by Grob.

As of 1 April 2023, the ATC strength is 34,070 cadets (30% female) and 9,190 adult volunteers (30% female).

== History ==
=== Foundation ===
Air Commodore Sir John Chamier is affectionately known as the 'father of the air cadet movement'. He joined the Royal Flying Corps (RFC), the forerunner of the Royal Air Force, where he served as a pilot in World War I. He transferred to the Royal Air Force (RAF) upon its formation in 1918. After retiring from the service in 1929, Chamier became Secretary-General of the Air League; an organisation made up of people who wanted to make the British public aware of the importance of military aviation.

=== Air Defence Cadet Corps ===
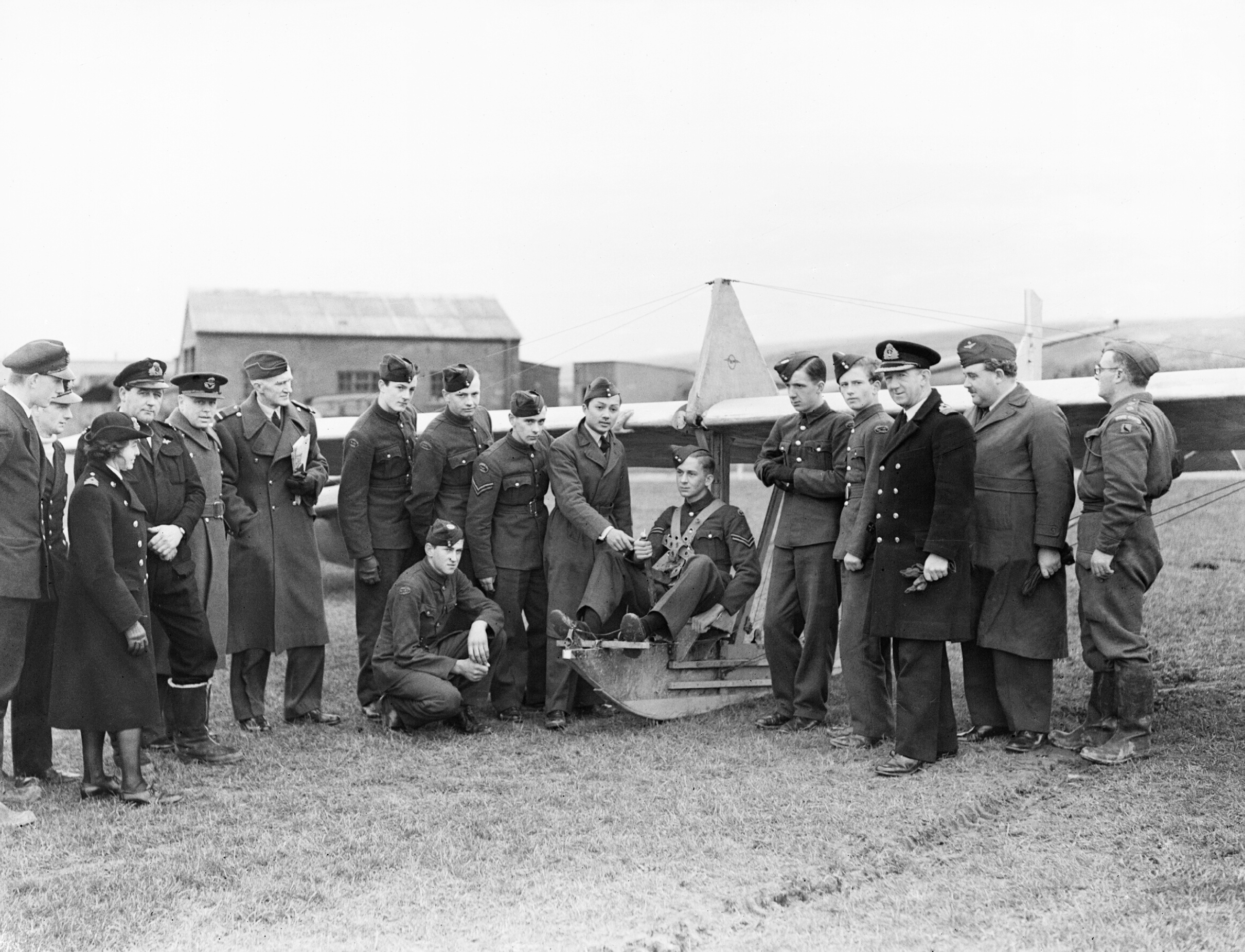
Air cadets learn the basics of flight at RNAS St Merryn in Cornwall, February 1944.

The purpose of the Air Defence Cadet Corps (ADCC), set up in 1938 by Air Commodore Chamier, was to train young men in various aviation-related skills. The ADCC proved popular, with thousands joining up. In February 1941, to provide the means of giving part-time air training to teenagers and young men who might later join the Royal Air Force, the ADCC was formally established as the Air Training Corps by Royal Warrant.

=== Air Training Corps ===
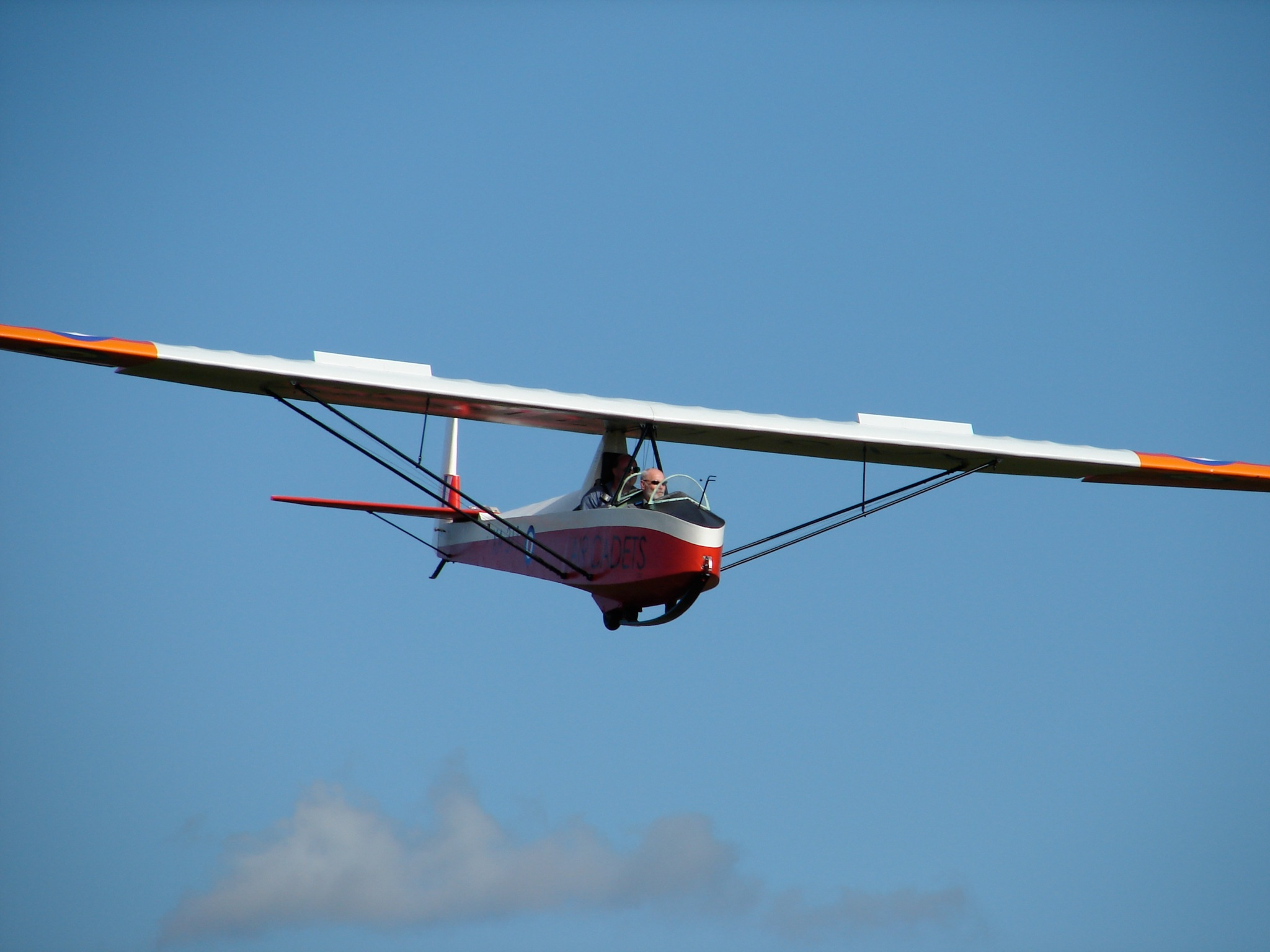
Slingsby Cadet TX.3 glider used by the ATC from 1953 to 1986.

On 5 February 1941; 85 years ago, the Air Training Corps (ATC) was officially established, with King George VI agreeing to be the Air Commodore-in-Chief, and issuing a Royal Warrant setting out the Corps' aims. Within the first month of its existence, the size of the old ADCC, now the ATC, virtually doubled to more than 400 squadrons, and continued to grow thereafter. A new badge was designed for the ATC and, once approved by the King, was distributed in August 1941. The motto 'Venture Adventure', devised by Air Commodore Chamier, was adopted by the ATC and incorporated into the badge.

The new ATC squadrons adopted training programmes to prepare young men for entry into the Royal Air Force. Squadrons arranged visits to RAF and Fleet Air Arm stations as part of the cadets' training, where a flight might be a possibility. Such opportunities were not widely available, however, and many cadets were disappointed. One solution was to introduce opportunities for flying, as a way to allow a cadet to get the feel of an aircraft in flight and to handle an aircraft's controls whilst airborne. After the end of the Second World War, gliding lessons became available.

Before the 1980s, females were unable to join the ATC, although they were able to join an attached unit of the Girls Venture Corps (GVC) which had been formed in the early years of the Second World War, if one was available at their location.

Before May 2008, cadets would spend a lot of time in the classroom before obtaining First Class classification, studying the following subjects: The Air Training Corps, The Royal Air Force, History of Flight, Initial Expedition Training, Basic Communications, and Airmanship I. After many lectures, and when the cadet felt ready, they would take a multiple-choice examination, either on paper or on a computer. Some wings ran courses that would involve the cadet spending a few days learning, and then awarded the appropriate classification if successful in their exams. In May 2008, Headquarters Air Cadets (HQAC) decided to change the training programme for junior and second class cadets, sensing that recruits were being deterred by exams. In March 2016, after a review of the then current training syllabus, the new 'Progressive Training Syllabus' was introduced, which provided for four levels of each badge (blue, bronze, silver, and gold).

=== Investigation into sexual abuse ===
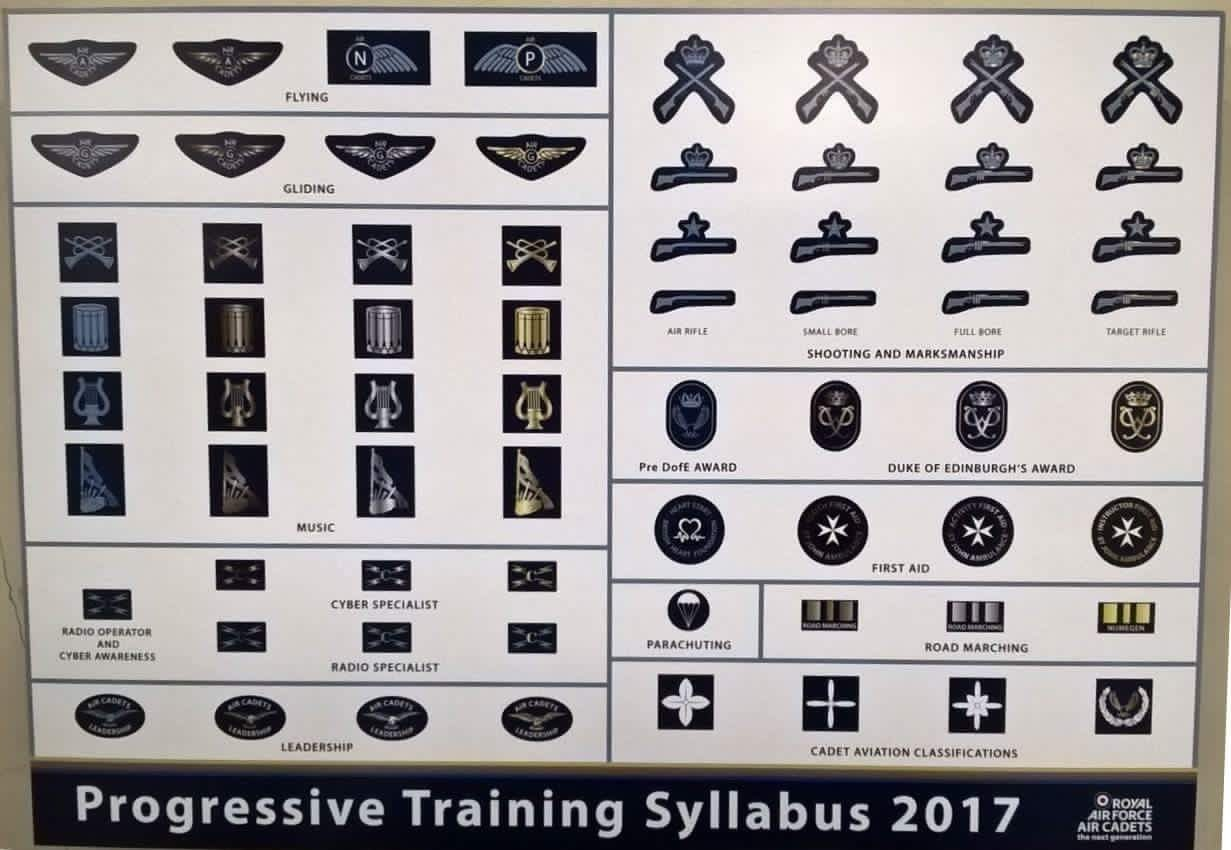
RAF Air Cadet Progressive Training Syllabus (2017).

In 2012, payouts made to victims of sexual abuse by the MOD, across all Cadet Forces, totalled £1,475,844. The payouts in 2013 totalled £64,782, and £544,213 in 2014.

In 2017, a BBC Panorama episode entitled 'Cadet Abuse Cover-Up' highlighted sexual abuse cases in the British Cadet Forces. Through the years 2012 to 2017, there were 134 allegations of sexual abuse made against ATC volunteers, including historical allegations; 96 cases were referred to the Police for investigation, and 9 offenders were dismissed.

=== Air Cadet Organisation ===
Until October 2017, advertising material such as leaflets and official websites branded the Air Training Corps and Combined Cadet Force collectively as the Air Cadet Organisation (ACO). This term was replaced by the Royal Air Force Air Cadets (RAFAC).

== Structure and organisation ==
The United Kingdom is split into six regions (akin to the former geographic groups of the RAF), each commanded by a Full-Time Reserve Group Captain in the RAF Reserves, and having a Regional Chairman and Regional Chaplain. Each region is sub-divided into many wings. There were historically six wings per region, however, as of 2013 there were 34 wings, most named after the one or two counties of the United Kingdom that they operate in. Wings are further sub-divided into sectors. Within the sectors lie squadrons, and it is the squadron that is the focal point for the majority of members of the Corps. As of October 2025, there were over 1,000 ATC squadrons.

=== Regions ===
Region	Regional Commandant	Regional Chair
Central & East Region	Group Captain Dave Boreham BSc(Hons) RAF	David Ellis GCGI
London and South East Region (LaSER)	Group Captain Kevin Walton RAF	Colin Gale
North Region	Group Captain Mark Leeming OBE MA FInstLM MCIPD RAFR	Julie Delaney
Scotland & Northern Ireland Region	Group Captain Sohail Khan RAF	Eddie Carr
South West Region	Group Captain Jason Chalk RAF	Anthony Clavell
Wales & West Region	Group Captain Roger Simon MA RAFR	Andrew Maund

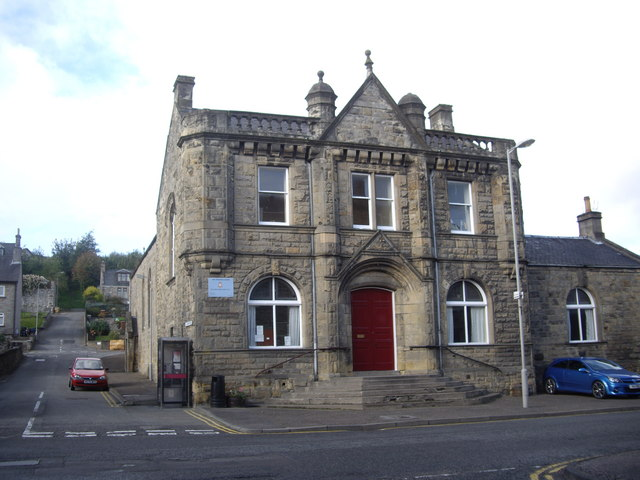
Air Training Corps, Rothes.

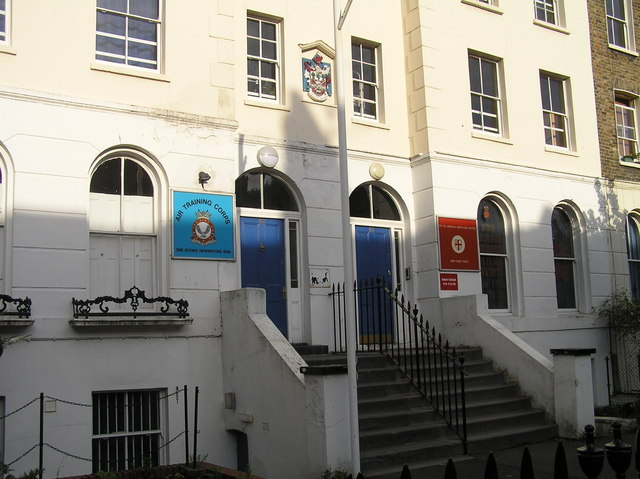
Albion Road, London N16 – Air Training Corps, Army Cadet Force. These premises have been used by the Air Training Corps (ATC) and Army Cadets for training since at least 1940.

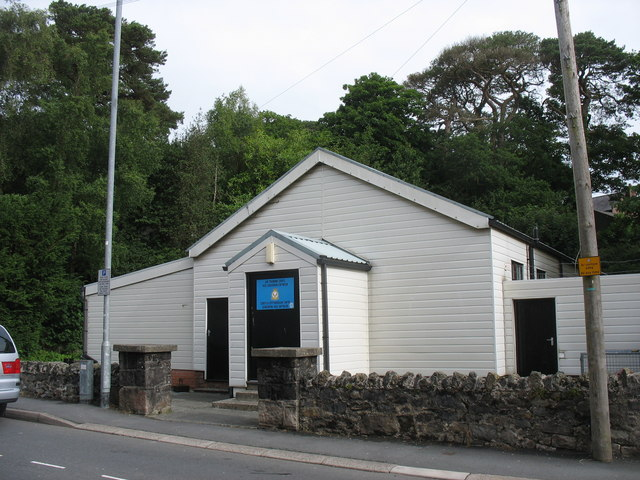
The HQ of 1465 (Gwynedd) Air Training Corps in Dale Street.

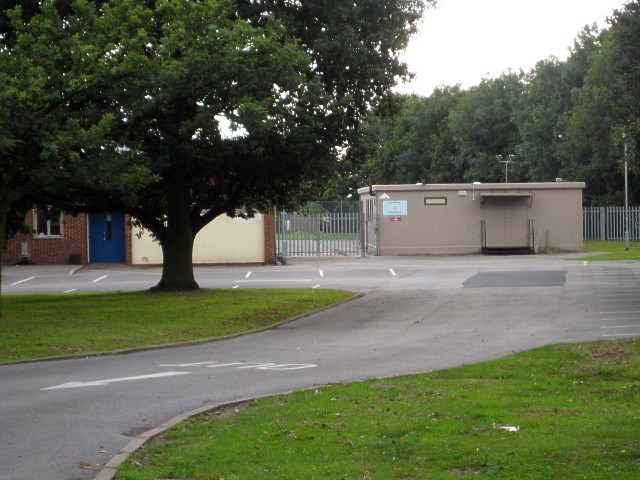
ATC 300 (Axholme) Sqn. The ATC training centre is located in the grounds of Axholme school, on Wharf Road.

=== Wings ===
Wings of the Air Training Corps by Region
Central & East	London & South East	North	Scotland & Northern Ireland	South West	Wales & West
Bedfordshire & Cambridgeshire Wing	London Wing	Central & East Yorkshire Wing	North Scotland Wing	Bristol & Gloucestershire Wing	Warwickshire & Birmingham Wing
Hertfordshire Wing	Kent Wing	Cumbria & Lancashire Wing	South East Scotland Wing	Devon & Somerset Wing	No. 1 Welsh Wing
Norfolk & Suffolk Wing	Middlesex Wing	Durham Northumberland Wing	West Scotland Wing	Dorset & Wiltshire Wing	No. 2 Welsh Wing
South & East Midlands Wing	Surrey Wing	Greater Manchester Wing	Central Scotland Wing	Hampshire & Isle of Wight Wing	No. 3 Welsh Wing
Trent Wing	Sussex Wing	South & West Yorkshire Wing	Northern Ireland Wing	Plymouth & Cornwall Wing	Staffordshire Wing
Essex Wing		Merseyside Wing		Thames Valley Wing	West Mercian Wing

== Governance ==
=== National ===
Headquarters Royal Air Force Air Cadets (HQ RAFAC, formerly Headquarters Air Cadets or HQAC) is based at RAF Cranwell in Lincolnshire, England. There are subordinate headquarters at region and wing levels, staffed by RAF and RAFAC officers (Note: Although previously Royal Air Force Volunteer Reserve (Training Branch), ATC officers now under the Cadet Forces Commission) and civil servants. HQ RAFAC controls two National Air Cadet Adventure Training Centres (NACATC): at Fairbourne, Gwynedd, Wales (currently closed); and Windermere, Cumbria, England. These NACATCs provide a range of adventure training courses and accommodation for squadron and wing expeditions. HQ RAFAC also controls (as of 2023) twelve Volunteer Gliding Squadrons (VGS) around the UK, through the Air Cadet Central Gliding School at RAF Syerston.

=== Local ===
ATC squadrons are established in most large towns in the United Kingdom. There are also ATC units in Cyprus, Gibraltar, the Channel Islands,the Isle of Man and formerly Germany. In towns not large enough to sustain a squadron of 30 cadets, or as a supplement to an existing squadron in a larger town or city, a Detached Flight (DF) may be formed. A detached flight operates much like any other unit, but is a component part of a nearby, larger squadron. As of October 2025, there were over 1,000 ATC squadrons.

An Officer Commanding (OC) a squadron is typically a flight lieutenant (RAFAC). If a squadron commanded by an SNCO, warrant officer, pilot officer, or flying officer, they are referred to as Officer in Charge (OIC) (unless they have completed their Squadron Commanders Course at RAF Cranwell, then they retain the title of Officer Commanding). Officers were previously appointed in the Royal Air Force Volunteer Reserve (Training Branch) RAFVR(T), but now receive a Cadet Forces Commission, introduced in 2017.

=== Civilian committees ===
In addition to the uniformed command structure, the ATC squadrons are supported by a parallel trustee pillar. A Civilian Committee (or 'CivCom') underpins fundraising and the management of non-public funds used to support activities and equipment that are not provided through central RAF funding beyond core services. Trustees operate at squadron, wing, regional, and national levels. The National Chair, who is the senior representative of the trustee pillar, is Mr Stuart Ensor OBE.

As with any charity, three officers (Chairperson, Secretary and Treasurer) are elected at an annual general meeting (AGM) and then exist as an independent group to raise and manage funds in a lawful manner in accordance with the Charities Act.

A Squadron's Civilian Committee is responsible for overseeing the initial unit formation and direction, and will monitor the welfare of cadets. Trustees are often parents of cadets and friends. Many squadron charities decide to operate against the RAFAC document known as ACP-11, which has been the traditional constitution. However, there is no requirement to do so, as long as the civilian committee establishes a constitution with acceptable charitable object statements; these may be similar to those in ACP-11. The Charity Commission has produced a model constitutions for this purpose.

== Culture ==
=== Aims and motto ===
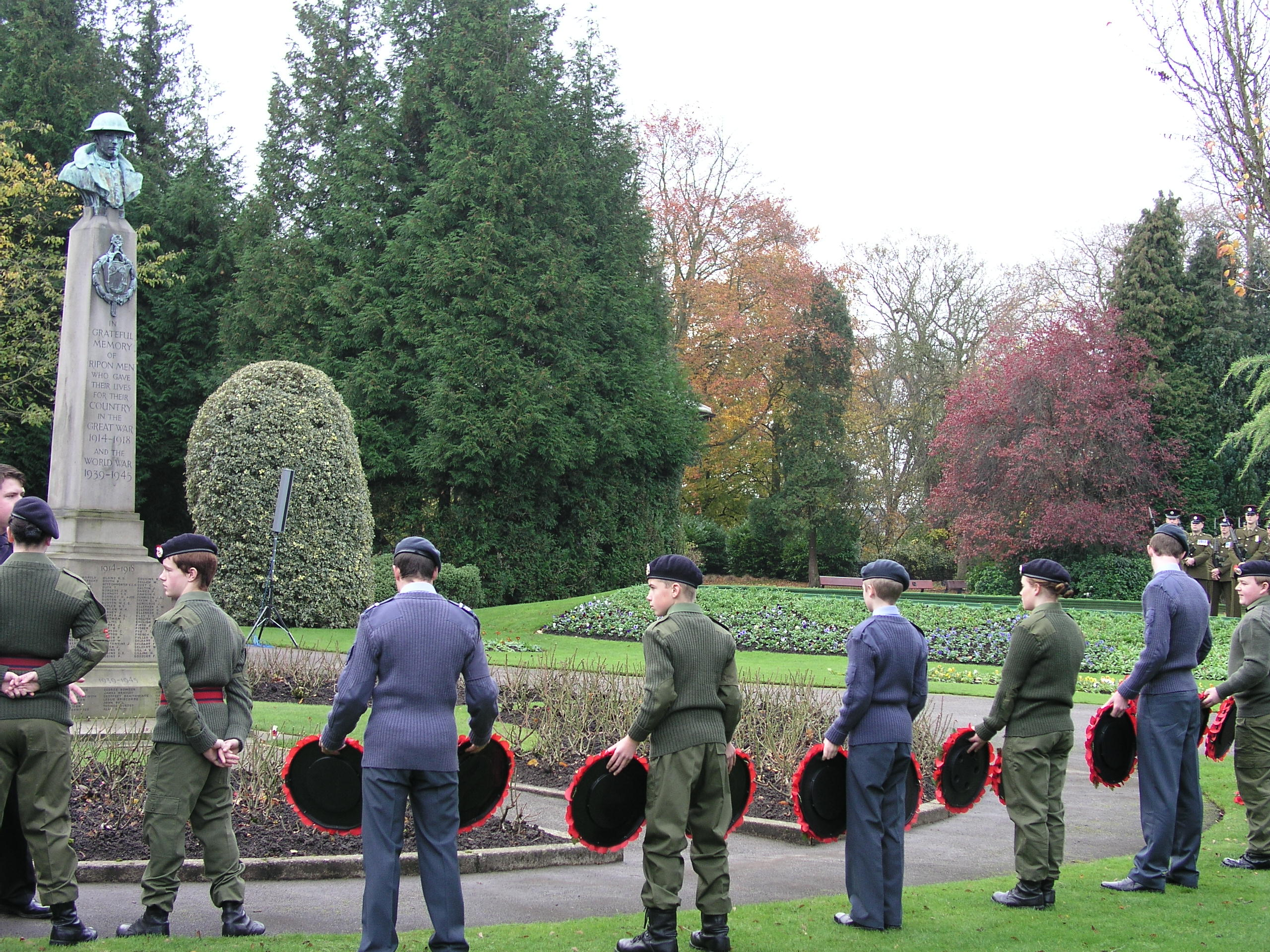
Cadets from the Air Training Corps and Army Cadet Force during Remembrance Sunday, 2006.

The aims of the Air Training Corps, as set out in the Royal Warrant and approved by King George VI in 1947, are:

- To promote and encourage among young men a practical interest in aviation and to fit them to serve their country in Our Air Force, its reserves and auxiliaries, and also in the Air Branch of Our Navy or in Our Army;
- To provide training which will be useful both in the Air Service and in civil life;
- To foster the spirit of adventure, to promote sports and pastimes in healthy rivalry and to develop the qualities of mind and body which go to the making of a leader and a good citizen.

The corps' motto is 'Venture, Adventure'.

=== Oath ===
Upon enrolment into the Air Training Corps, every cadet has to make the following promise, usually at a ceremony presided over by the unit's padre or commanding officer:

"I, *Full Name*, hereby solemnly promise on my honour to serve my Unit loyally and to be faithful to my obligations as a member of the Air Training Corps. I further promise to be a good citizen and to do my duty to (God and^) the King, my Country and my Flag."

=== Ensign ===
Air Training Corps Ensign.

The Air Training Corps Ensign is a flag, bearing the yellow falcon of the Air Training Corps with the motto below, which was authorised in June 1941.

=== Uniform ===
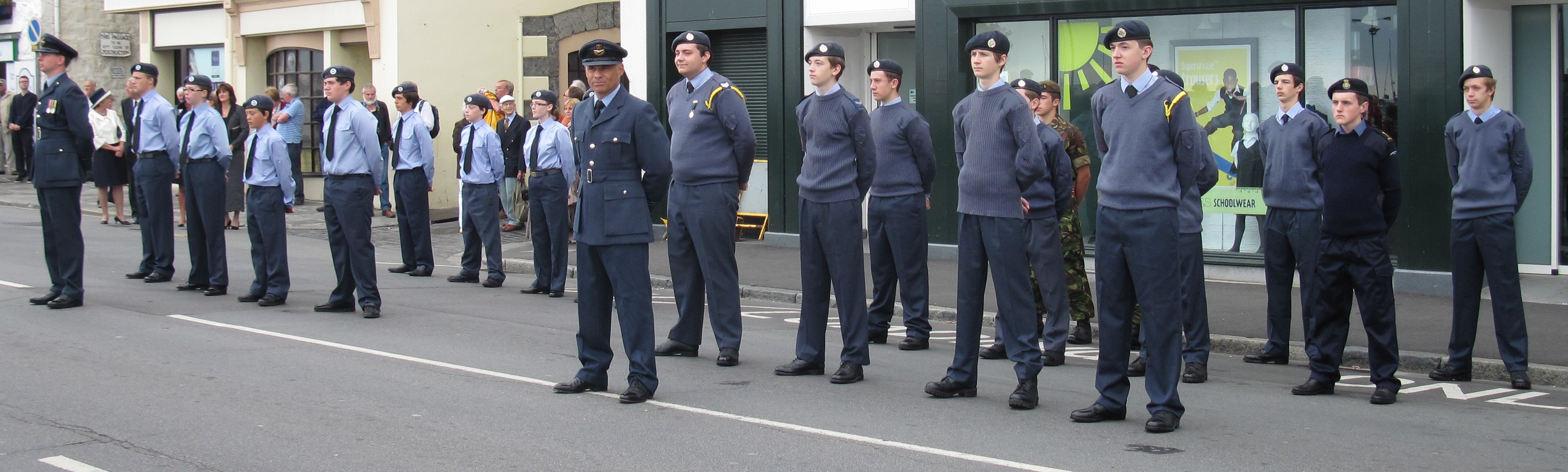
Parade and church service in Saint Peter Port, featuring ATC and CCF cadets, Guernsey, 16 September 2012.

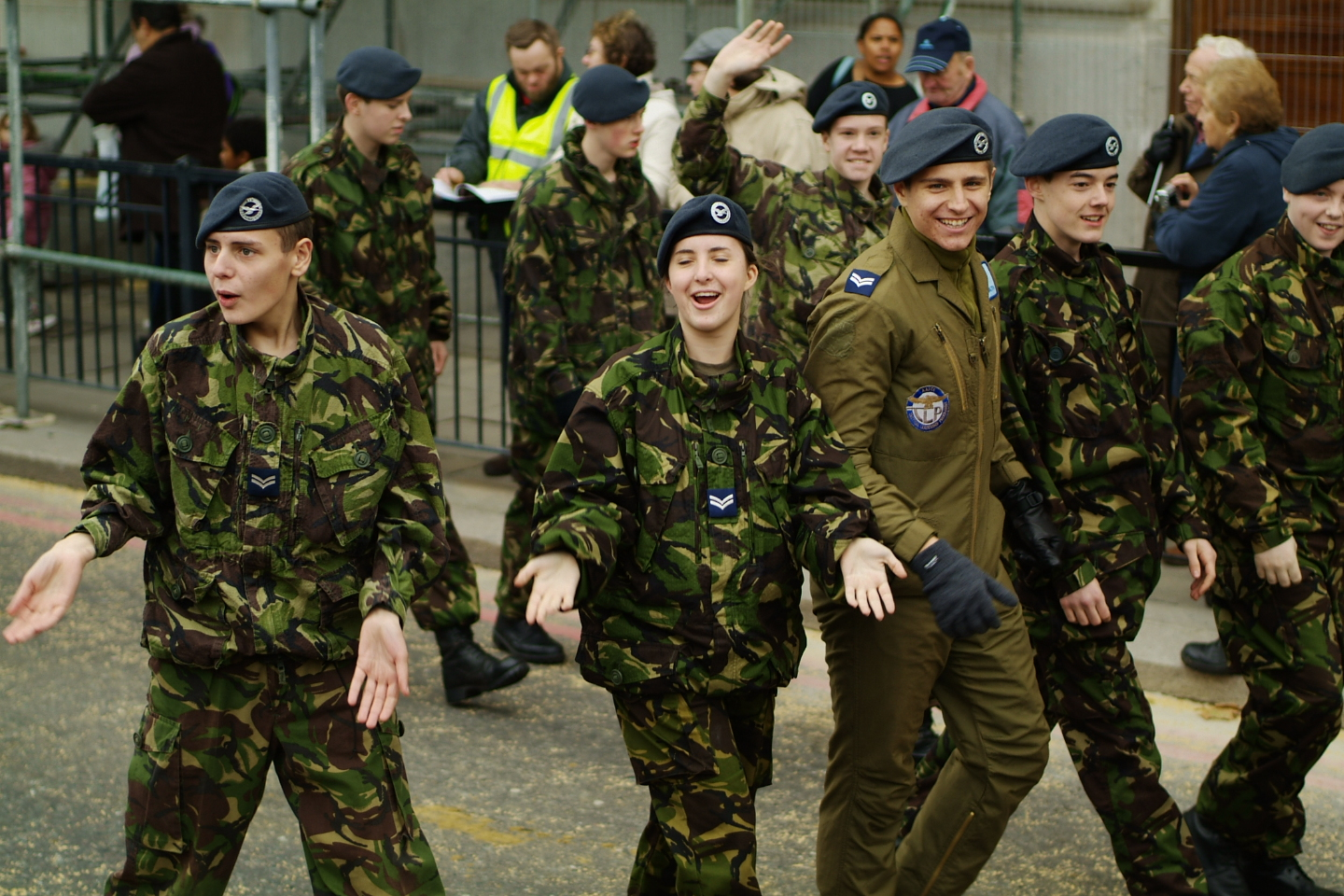
ATC cadets in the Lord Mayor's Show in the City of London, in 2006. Most wear Woodland Pattern DPM, with one wearing a flight suit.

All cadets are issued with a uniform that is derived from that worn by RAF personnel, and are regulated by dress regulations known as ACP 1358. Cadets primarily wear one of three uniforms:

- No. 2A (Full) Service Dress -AKA 'Best Blues'— consisting of a light blue (Wedgewood) shirt and black tie, a blue V-neck wool jumper, a brassard, blue-grey trousers or skirt / slacks, and an RAF blue beret with an Air Training Corps cap badge. The jumper is removed in variation No. 2A (Long Sleeved) Service Dress.
- No. 2C Service Dress — AKA 'Working/Dark Blues'- as above, but replacing the light blue shirt and tie with a dark blue shirt, worn with the top button undone. May be worn with or without the jumper.
- No. 3 Service Dress - Field Clothing — AKA 'Greens/Combats'- consisting of either CS95 or PCS-MTP field clothing.

In No. 3 Service Dress staff and cadets wear Tactical Recognition Flashes (TRF) on the right arm, formerly Officers wore the RAF tactical recognition flash, Adult Warrant Officers and Senior Non-Commissioned Officers wore the RAFAC Staff formation flash, and cadets wore RAFAC Cadet formation flash consisting of the former Air Cadets logo above the RAF logo in subdued colours on a green background. In 2024 the RAF Air Cadets adopted a new Tactical Recognition Flash (TRF) which features an eagle and the lettering "RAF" above the eagle, and "AIR CADETS" below the eagle all in gold, against the RAF TRF background. This new TRF is worn by all members of the organisation, staff and cadets.

=== Squadron insignia ===
The first fifty Air Training Corps squadrons that were formed retain an 'F' to show they are 'founder' squadrons, e.g. 1F (City of Leicester) Squadron.

== Activities ==
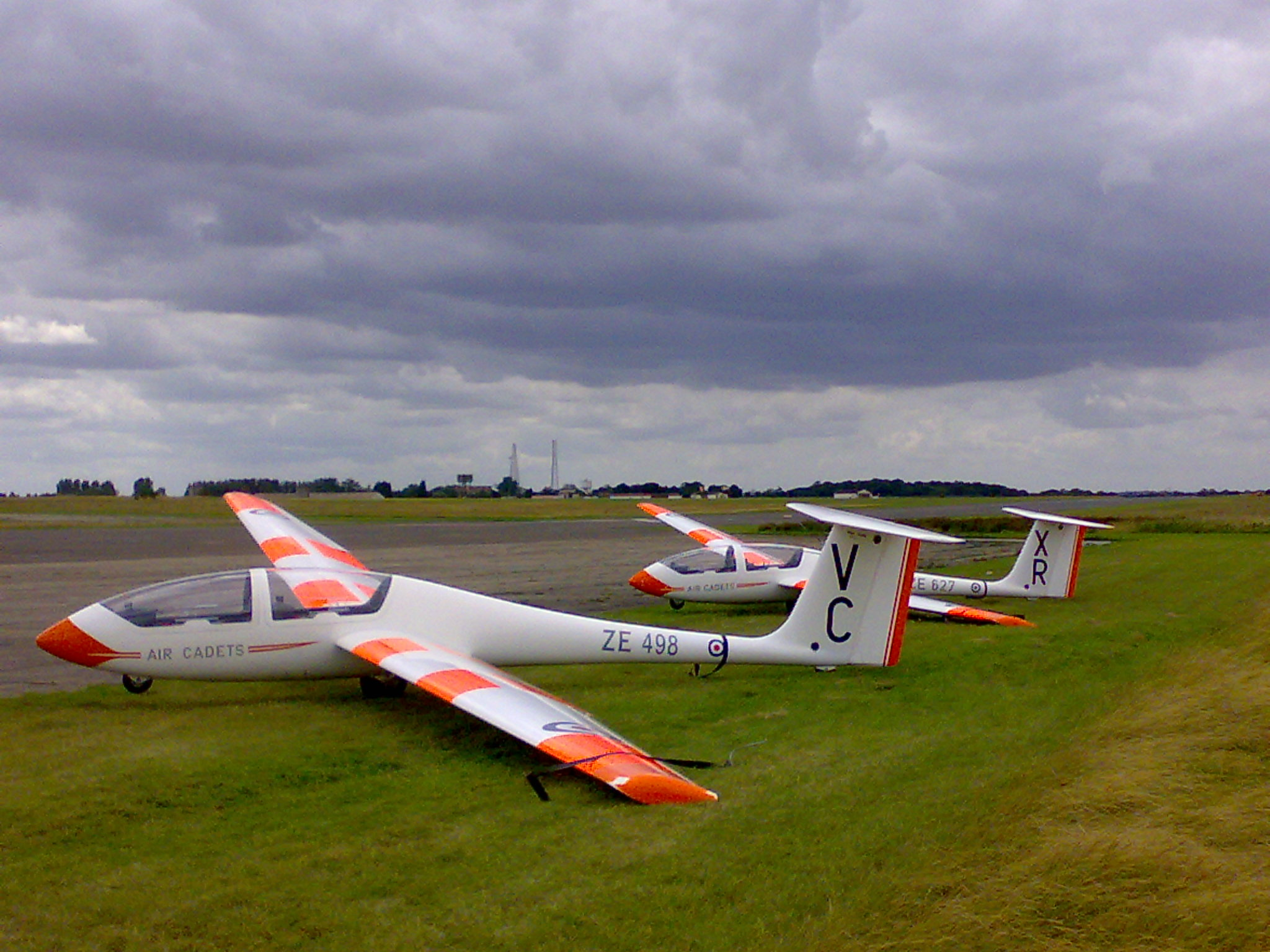
Grob Viking T1 gliders of the Air Training Corps.

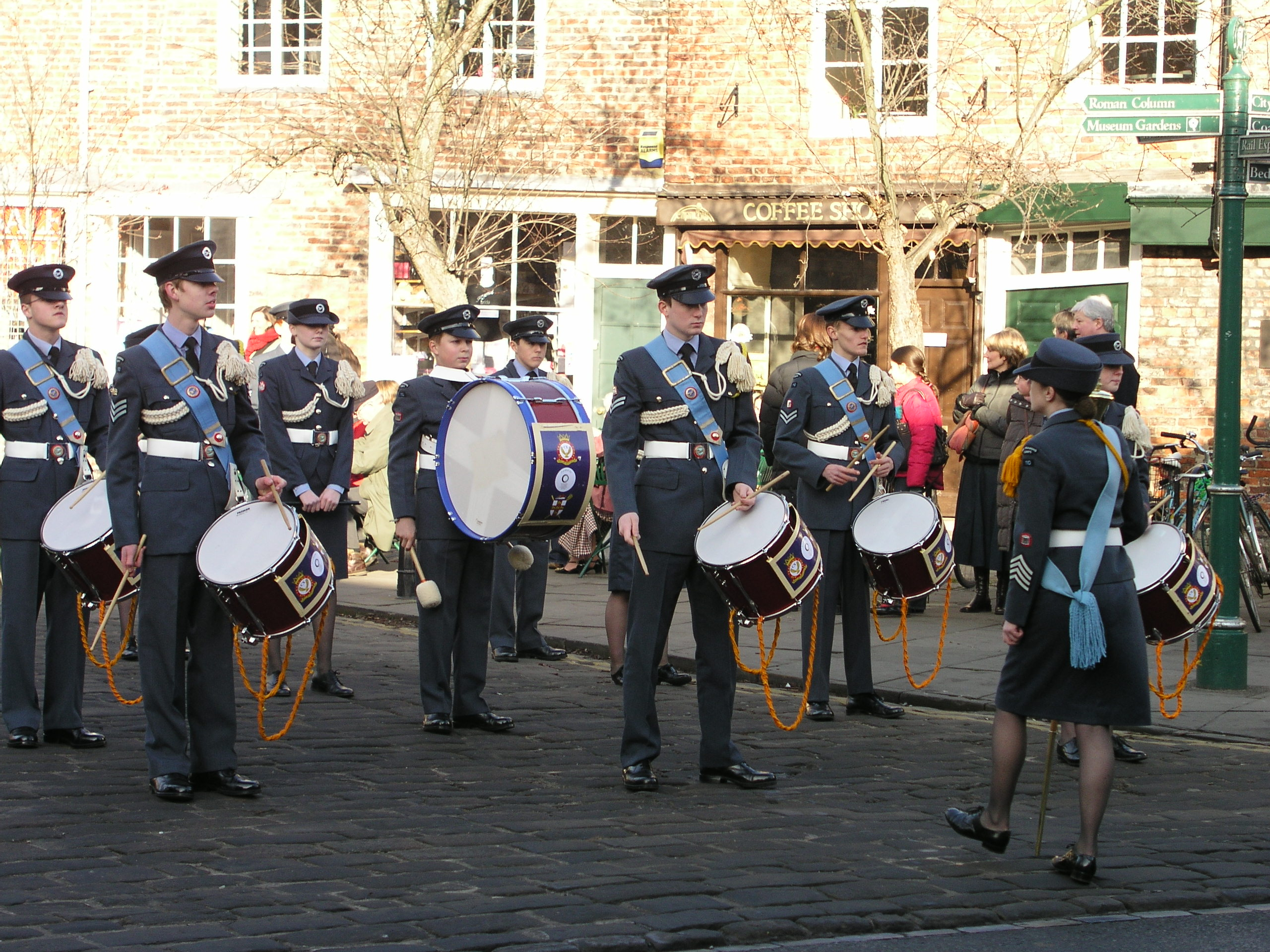
An Air Training Corps marching band from City of York Squadron.

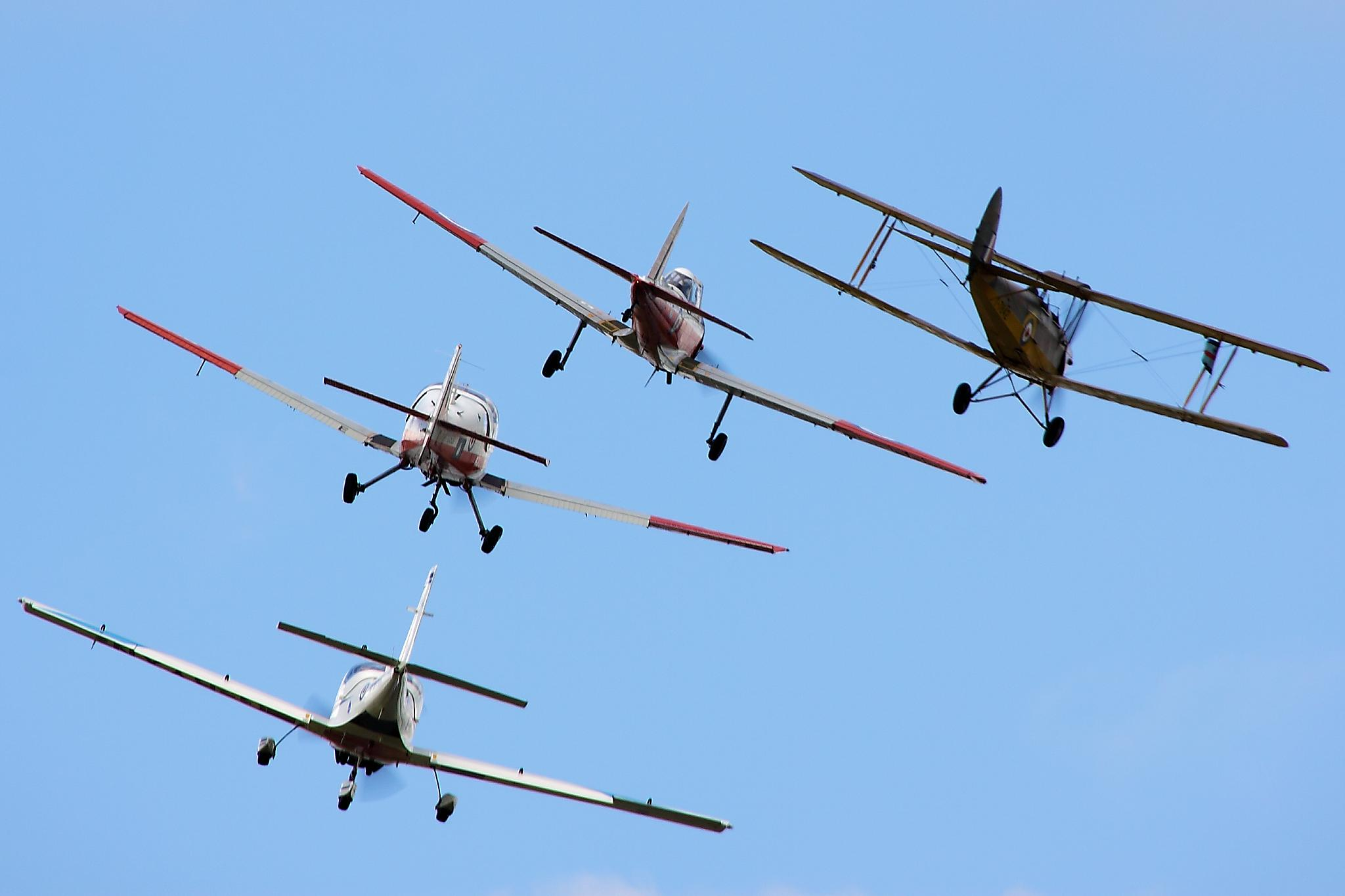
An Air Training Corps formation of former and current aircraft used to provide Air Experience Flights to cadets, RIAT 2011.

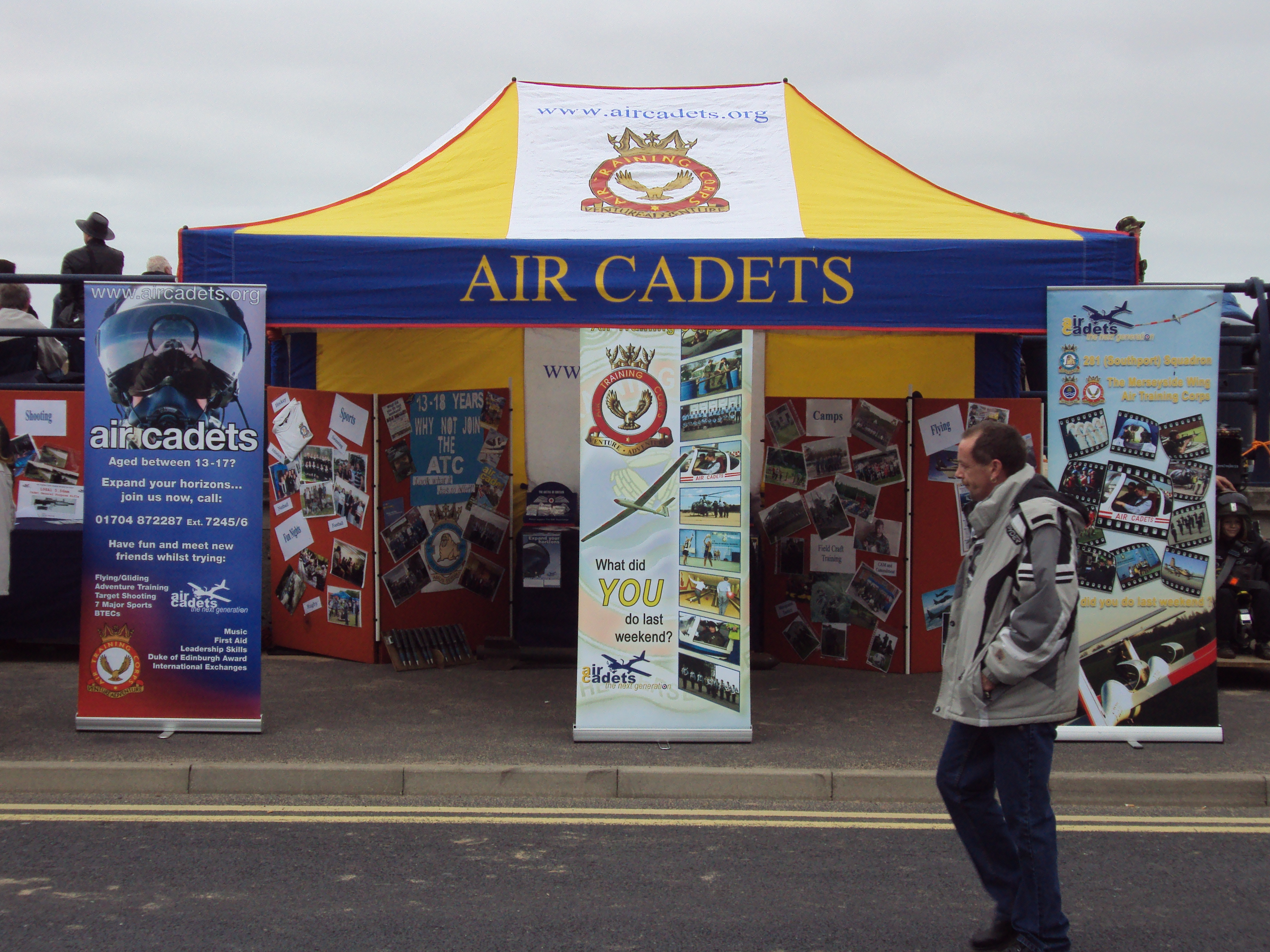
Air Cadets stall at the 2009 Southport Air Show, Merseyside, England.

ATC activities which include annual camps, in the UK and overseas, are intended to help develop teamwork as well as leadership skills.

One large annual camp is the Royal International Air Tattoo (RIAT) camp held annually in July for the major airshow at RAF Fairford. Each year, cadets aged above 16 years and their staff spend between one and three weeks, carrying out essential work in the preparation, and the subsequent taking-down of the infrastructure for RIAT.

=== Corps-wide trophies ===
Air Training Corps squadrons each have a chance annually to win the two most prized trophies in the corps. The Sir Alan Lees trophy is awarded by the commandant Air Training Corps to the squadron with the best statistics and overall impression when inspected. The Morris Trophy is awarded to one of the six regional candidates upon inspection by the commandant.

Sir Alan Lees Trophy
year	winning ATC squadron	ATC wing	Officer Commanding
2022	No. 241 (Wanstead and Woodford) Squadron	London Wing	Sqn Ldr Jerry Godden RAFAC
2023	No. 230 (Congleton) Squadron	Greater Manchester Wing	Flt Lt Kate Clarke RAFAC
2024	No. 308 (City of Colchester) Squadron	Essex Wing	Sqn Ldr Elly Shipley RAFAC

The Morris Trophy
year	winning ATC squadron	ATC wing	Officer Commanding
2022	No. 2344 (Longbenton) Squadron	Durham & Northumberland Wing	Flt Lt Gary Richardson RAFAC
2023	No. 261 (Guildford) Squadron	Surrey Wing	Flt Lt Andy Brittain RAFAC
2024	No. 2175 (Rolls Royce) Squadron	West Scotland Wing	Flt Lt Stuart McLellan MBE RAFAC

The Foster Trophy is awarded to the cadet who has achieved the highest academic results in the entire corps over their time in the Air Training Corps, after finishing the cadet syllabus that leads to a BTEC Level 2 Certificate in Aviation Studies. In addition, there are also trophies presented annually by the Royal Air Forces Association (RAFA). These trophies include the 'Sir Douglas Bader Wings Appeal Trophy' for the ATC squadron collecting the most money on a per capita basis, the squadron achieving second place is awarded the 'Sir Augustus Walker Trophy'. The 'Sir Robert Saundby Trophy' is awarded for collecting the highest net Wings Appeal amount.

The Quinton Memorial Trophy is a national award presented annually to the adult non-commissioned officer (NCO) who has gained the top academic results in the senior non-commissioned officer (SNCO) initial courses held at the Air Cadet Adult Training Facility, Royal Air Force College Cranwell (RAFC). This trophy is named in honour of Flight Lieutenant John Quinton. (Note: Flight Lieutenant John Alan Quinton was an RAF navigator on a Wellington aircraft, which was flying an air cadet on an Air Experience Flight in 1951. During the flight, the aircraft was involved in a mid-air collision, and Flight Lieutenant Quinton gave the only parachute within reach to the cadet, pushing him out of the aircraft. His quick thinking and heroic action saved the life of the cadet but cost him his own, for which he was posthumously awarded the George Cross.)

== Air Training Corps ranks ==
Young people who have begun their 2nd year of Secondary School (Year 8), and are under 16 3/4 years old can join the Air Training Corps (ATC). They are initially given the title 'Junior Cadet', and can go along to most squadron (or flight) meetings to get a feel for the ATC. Enrolment confers the status of Second Class Cadet, and upon completion of the First Class syllabus, they become First Class Cadets and receive their First Class badge to be worn on their brassard. As cadets become more experienced within the Air Training Corps (ATC), and if suitable, they can be promoted by their squadron's commanding officer (CO) to the status of cadet non-commissioned officers (NCOs). These ranks include Corporal, Sergeant, Flight Sergeant and Cadet Warrant Officer.

The Cadet NCO ranks within the ATC mirror those of the RAF's non-technical / non-flying trades, and are, in descending order of seniority:

Air Training Corps					No insignia
Air Training Corps	Cadet warrant officer	Cadet flight sergeant	Cadet sergeant	Cadet corporal	Cadet
Air Training Corps	CWO	Cdt FS	Cdt Sgt	Cdt Cpl	Cdt

It is common within the ATC to abbreviate these ranks by dropping the prefix 'cadet'. Cadet Warrant Officers are not addressed as 'Sir' or 'Ma'am', but as 'Cadet Warrant Officer' or informally as 'CWO' (pronounced 'si', 'wəʊ', or alternatively as an acronym) or 'Cadet Warrant', the former being preferred by cadets and staff, in order to reduce ambiguity with the adult substantive rank of Warrant Officer. This is the only rank in the Corps to accommodate the 'Cadet' prefix upon being referred to by members of the Corps.

== Cadet classification syllabus ==
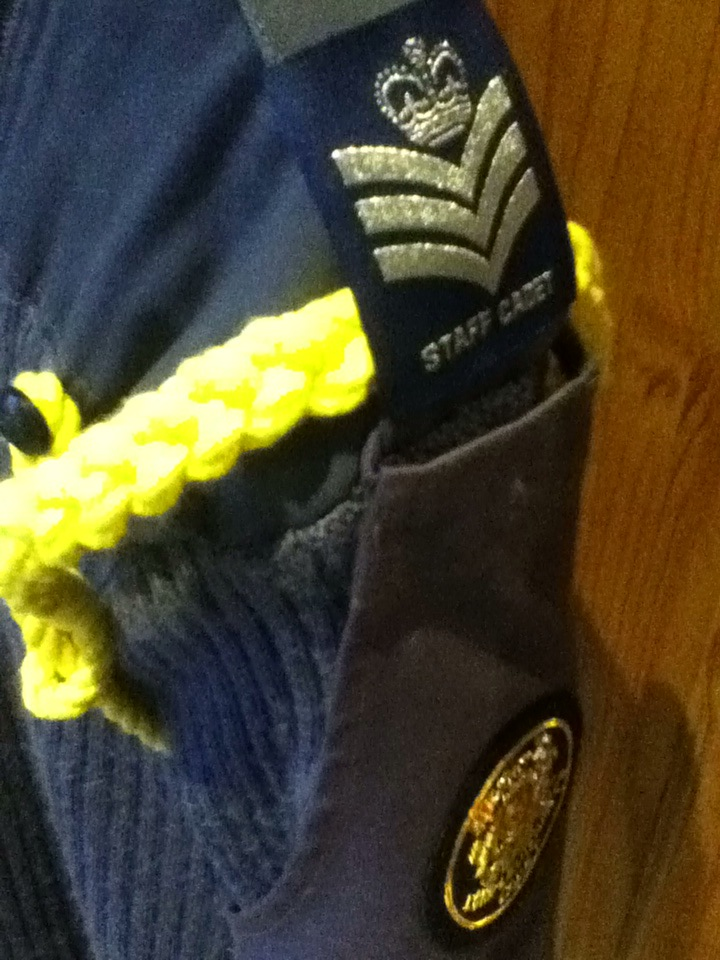
An 'Instructor Cadet' yellow lanyard.

Whilst not all cadets who join the Air Training Corps (ATC) will be eligible for promotion, all cadets can progress through the (ATC) training system and, by passing exams, achieve different classifications. The classification levels are Junior Cadet, Second Class Cadet (this is automatically achieved on enrolment), First Class Cadet, Leading Cadet, Senior Cadet, and Master Air Cadet. (Note: Often incorrectly referred to as 'Master Cadet' - ACTO 1 does not use this terminology.)

The Method of Instruction course is not a classification as such, but rather a qualification. This allows them to teach other cadets a variety of subjects. Although this is not compulsory, ATC Wings ordinarily feed this hand-in-hand with the Staff Cadet Course (see below). Upon successful completion of this course, the cadet will be awarded a yellow lanyard to distinguish them. Leading Cadet, Senior Cadet, and Master Air Cadet exams consist of multiple assessment criteria each containing two questions. A cadet must achieve either 1 or 2 marks (50% or 100%) for each module in order to pass. All exams are taken online on a system called Bader Learn.

In September 2010, a new classification structure, syllabus and examination process came into force. The Senior Cadet badge shows a four-bladed propeller with a small four pointed star in the centre in an X orientation. The Master Air Cadet badge for the brassard shows an ATC Falcon surrounded by laurel leaves. For each badge, cadets must pass three of the following subjects, for Master Air Cadet they may not use the same three subjects they used on Senior Cadet:

- Aircraft handling and flying techniques
- Air Power
- Piston engine propulsion
- Jet engine propulsion
- Rocketry
- Airframes
- Avionics and aircraft electrical systems
- Basic air navigation
- Basic principals of pilot navigation
- Advanced radio and radar
- Data communications

=== Specialist Instructor and Leadership Qualifications ===
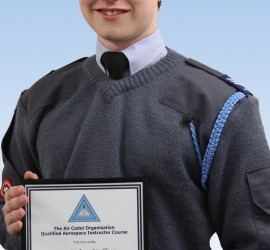
A Qualified Aerospace Instructor Cadet wearing the blue QAI lanyard.

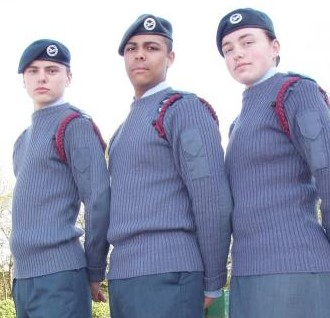
Qualified Junior Leaders wearing the maroon JL lanyard.

==== Qualified Aerospace Instructors ====
Alongside Instructor Cadet there is another lanyard that can be awarded to cadets who are interested in specialising in teaching aerospace subjects. These qualified cadets are known as Qualified Aerospace Instructors (QAIs), and wear a light blue lanyard over their left shoulder. The Qualified Aerospace Instructors Course (QAIC) has been available since September 2008. The course is held at RAF Linton-on-Ouse, and as of 2011, also at MOD Boscombe Down (as of RAF Linton-on-Ouse's closure in December 2020, the North centre was moved to Inskip Cadet Centre as of QAIC 14). The course is held from early September to Easter of the following year, beginning with a selection weekend in early September, and seven total weekends (as of QAIC 8, prior to this there were only six training weekends) from late September until early March. The course culminates in a 'Graduation Week' which is organised to coincide with the Easter holidays to avoid clashing with school programmes. After completing training in various modules, they carry out examinations in all modules (air traffic control, air power, flight simulators, aerodynamics, and Instructional Teaching and Presentation Skills (ITPS)); satisfactory performance in all exams results in the cadet being awarded the pale blue QAIC lanyard and flight suit badge. Upon completion of the course, graduating students are offered affiliated membership to the Royal Aeronautical Society.

==== Junior Leaders Course ====
For those interested in fieldcraft teaching and leadership, there is the Junior Leaders Course. Successful completion of the course awards the participant a maroon lanyard to be worn over their left shoulder and a junior leaders badge to sew on to the left sleeve of their No.3 Service Dress (field uniform) to show they are a qualified Junior Leader. The course used to run from September to Easter, involving six weekend training camps and an assessment week. The course is aimed at more senior cadets, and as such, an age restriction of 17 years applies. Not only this, but the course also requires the participant to hold the rank of Cadet Sergeant or higher. The course culminates in the award of a Level 3 Certificate in Leadership & Management from the Institute of Leadership and Management. The course is also open to Sea Cadets and Army Cadets.

== Adult staff and ranking ==
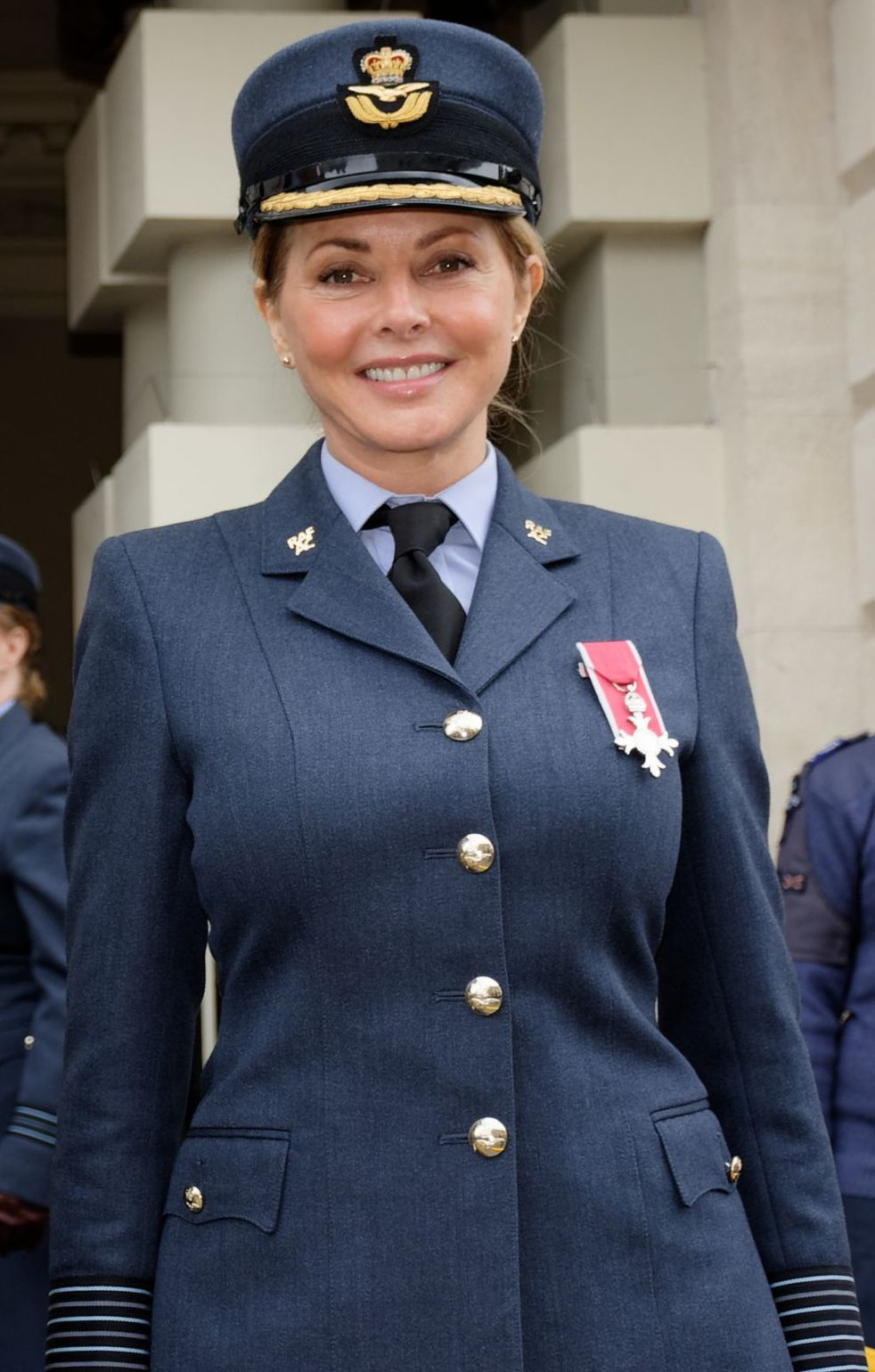
Group Captain Carol Vorderman RAFAC in her role as Honorary Ambassador.

Three categories of supervisory staff run the Air Training Corps (ATC) at the unit level: commissioned officers, senior NCOs, and civilian instructors (CIs). All uniformed staff must attend training courses run by the Royal Air Force at the Royal Air Force Air Cadets (RAFAC) Adult Training Facility (ATF), located at RAF College Cranwell (RAFC), usually within a year of appointment, with further courses as they progress up the rank structure.

=== Officers ===
Since December 2017, all RAFAC officers in the Air Training Corps are commissioned with a Cadet Forces Commission (CFC) and ranks framework, with previous RAFVR(T) officers having their commissions transferred to CFC commissions.

Squadrons are usually commanded by CFC Flight Lieutenants (Flt Lt) and Flying Officers (Fg Off), who are also found as Wing and Regional staff officers, along with Squadron Leaders (Sqn Ldr) and Wing Commanders (Wg Cdr). Particularly large squadrons are sometimes commanded by Squadron Leaders (typically when the squadron has 100 or more cadets). The most senior rank in the Cadet Forces Commission is that of Wing Commander, with the exception of the ambassador to the Air Cadets, and the single senior RAFAC volunteer, who both hold the honorary rank of Group Captain (Gp Capt) RAFAC, under a CFC. The current ambassador is Emma Wolstenholme. The current senior volunteer is Ben Wakefield.

Air Training Corps adult officer ranks – post-December 2017
insignia								
rank	Air Commodore	Group Captain (R) / Group Captain (RAFAC) (Note: Group Captains who perform the role of Regional Commandant are commissioned as members of the Royal Air Force Reserve, RAF(R), and so wear standard Group Captain rank insignia. Group Captain (RAFAC) is only held by the Honorary Ambassador to the Air Cadets.)	Wing Commander (RAFAC)	Squadron Leader (RAFAC)	Flight Lieutenant (RAFAC)	Flying Officer (RAFAC)	Pilot Officer (RAFAC)	Acting Pilot Officer (RAFAC)
abbr	Air Cdre	Gp Capt	Wg Cdr	Sqn Ldr	Flt Lt	Fg Off	Plt Off	APO

=== Ambassador to the Air Cadets ===
In April 2013, Sir Chris Hoy was appointed the first Ambassador to the Royal Air Force Air Cadets (RAFAC), and assumed the rank of Honorary Group Captain RAFVR(T).

In November 2014, Carol Vorderman accepted the appointment of Ambassador to the Royal Air Force Air Cadets, saying: "I am truly honoured to be appointed as an ambassador for the RAF Air Cadets. I can't wait to meet the cadets, and the adult volunteer staff who give so much of their time to support them. The cadets themselves are a shining example of the best of British youngsters, standing with them on a parade square will be a great privilege." Vorderman assumed the rank of Honorary Group Captain RAFVR(T) (changed to Group Captain RAFAC from December 2017) for the duration of her appointment. She is the first female to be appointed Ambassador.

In November 2021, rower Emma Wolstenholme was appointed Wing Commander (RAFAC) and Honorary Ambassador to the Air Cadets. She is a former serving Royal Air Force officer, and planned to row solo across the Atlantic Ocean in early 2022. However, this attempt and later ones were postponed due to sub-optimal weather conditions. A successful attempt was made on Sunday 4 June 2023, rowing 2,000 miles around Great Britain.

=== Air Commodore-in-Chief ===
King George VI was the first person to hold the position of Air Commodore-in-Chief of the Air Training Corps, which he held from 1941 to 1952. Upon Elizabeth II's accession to the throne in 1952, Prince Philip, Duke of Edinburgh was appointed Air Commodore-in-Chief of the Air Training Corps. On 16 December 2015, Prince Philip stepped down from the role and was succeeded by the then Duchess of Cambridge as honorary Air Commodore-in-Chief.

=== NCOs and WOs ===
Adults may also be appointed as senior non-commissioned officers (SNCO), these being ranks within the Air Training Corps. Adult SNCOs and warrant officers (WO) are uniformed in the same way as their RAF counterparts, except that the embroidered text of 'RAF AIR CADETS' appears below their rank insignia. Since December 2017, Air Training Corps SNCOs and WOs had their ranks transferred to the new RAFAC commissions and ranks framework. A gilt RAFAC badge is worn on the lapels when in No.1 dress uniform, to denote membership within the cadet forces.

In 2020, all RAFAC Warrant Officers and Warrant Officers (Aircrew) in the Air Training Corps were granted use of the Royal Arms insignia, to bring the RAFAC other ranks insignia into alignment with those of their Royal Air Force counterparts.

Air Training Corps warrant officers (WO) and senior non-commissioned officers (SNCO)
groundcrew insignia					
aircrew insignia					
title (Note: Adult staff who are working in aircrew roles, such as at Volunteer Gliding Squadrons or at Air Experience Flights are authorised to wear the Aircrew insignia for their rank accordingly.)	Warrant Officer / Master Aircrew	Warrant Officer (until 2020) (Note: No longer used, as of October 2020, all WO (RAFAC) now use the Royal Arms badge, and all MAcr (RAFAC) use the MAcr badge.)	Flight Sergeant	Sergeant	Sergeant (pre-CIC) (Note: Often informally referred to as 'Acting Sergeant' or 'Probationary Sergeant', but always addressed as per the non-acting counterpart.)
abbr	WO / MAcr	WO	FS	Sgt	Act/Sgt

=== Staff (adult) ranks pre-December 2017 ===
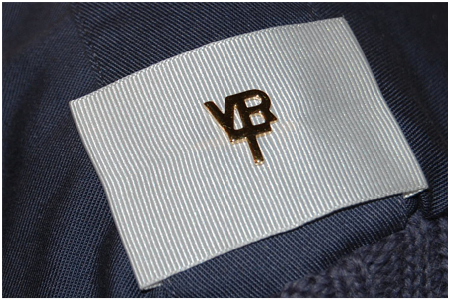
RAFVR(T) Officer Cadet rank slide.

Air Training Corps officers were previously commissioned into the Royal Air Force Volunteer Reserve (Training Branch), RAFVR(T), a specific training branch of the Royal Air Force Volunteer Reserve, the RAFVR (military reservists). They previously wore a gilt 'VRT' pin badge upon their rank braid, while warrant officers and SNCOs wore a gilt 'ATC' pin badge. The Air Training Corps ranks of adult SNCOs and WOs were Sergeant (ATC), Flight Sergeant (ATC), and Warrant Officer (ATC). (Note: Prior to the 'LaSER (London and South East Region) Review' of 2003, the adult ranks of Sergeant and Flight Sergeant did not exist, meaning that the non-commissioned rank structure of a squadron was more straightforward, i.e., Cadet, Cadet Corporal, Cadet Sergeant, Cadet Flight Sergeant, Cadet Warrant Officer, Adult Warrant Officer. This has been disturbed by inserting the ranks of Sgt (RAFAC) and FS (RAFAC) and WO (RAFAC). The rank of Sgt (RAFAC) is senior to all cadet ranks, including CWO. However, this does allow a wider scope for developing staff to progress as Senior Non-Commissioner Officers, and brings the ATC's adult rank structure more in line with those of the other cadet forces, whose adult ranks begin at Sergeant or service equivalent.)

Air Training Corps adult staff ranks (former), pre-Dec 2017
insignia	description
	The 'ATC' pin badge was formerly worn on the lower edge of shoulder rank slides or lapels of those that were an ATC NCO.
	Royal Air Force Volunteer Reserve (Training Branch) officers in the ATC, abbreviated RAFVR(T), were identified by the 'VRT' pin badge, as formerly worn on the lower-edge of shoulder rank slides and lapels.

=== Chaplains ===
Air Training Corps chaplains are usually civilian members of the local clergy (although uniformed forces chaplains may join as Service Instructors). The role of the chaplain in the ATC is to 'provide appropriate pastoral care for all personnel within the Air Cadet Organisation, irrespective of religious belief or status'. A chaplain's role in the local squadron is to offer guidance and leadership to cadets and members of staff on moral and spiritual matters. The commitment expected of a chaplain is a monthly visit to lead what is termed 'the Padre's hour', and to conduct the formal Enrolment Service when new cadets join. ATC chaplains are supported by the Royal Air Force Chaplains Branch. ATC chaplains do not wear uniform, but are recognised by a chaplain's badge on their lapel, and a larger version on their tippet (preaching scarf), vestments, or other clerical clothing. Even if it is not their custom to do so, ATC chaplains are expected to wear a clerical collar ('dog collar') when on an RAF station. The equivalent No.2 working dress for a chaplain is a dark sweater with chaplain's badge and a clerical collar.

Air Training Corps civilian staff identifying clothing and insignia
rank	identifying clothing and insignia
Civilian instructor (CI)	No official uniform, although may be seen with a lapel pin or an armband, or may be wearing a sweatshirt or polo shirt with an Air Training Corps logo.
Chaplain	Recognised by chaplain's badge on their lapel, or larger badge on their tippet (preaching scarf), expected to wear a clerical collar when on an RAF station.

== See also ==
Royal Air Force Air Cadets

- Air Experience Flight
- Volunteer Gliding Squadron

Other UK military branch supported cadets

- Sea Cadet Corps
  - Royal Marines Cadets
- Army Cadet Force

Other MoD sponsored or recognised cadet forces

- Volunteer Cadet Corps
- Combined Cadet Force

Related articles

- Cadets (youth program)
- The Duke of Edinburgh's Award
- Reserve Forces and Cadets Association
- Girls Venture Corps Air Cadets
- National Association of Training Corps for Girls

International Air Cadet organisations

- Australian Air Force Cadets
- Royal Canadian Air Cadets
- Civil Air Patrol
- Hong Kong Air Cadet Corps
- New Zealand Air Training Corps
