= No. 505 (Wessex) Squadron RAuxAF =

- Active: 2015–Present
- Country: United Kingdom
- Branch: Royal Air Force
- Type: General support
- Role: To provide general support to the wider RAF
- Size: Squadron
- Part of: No. 2 Group RAF
- Garrison/HQ: RAF St Mawgan
- Website: 505 Squadron RAuxAF

No. 505 (Wessex) Squadron, Royal Auxiliary Air Force (RAuxAF) is a general support squadron of the Royal Air Force's reserve component, the Royal Auxiliary Air Force.

== Formation ==
A squadron code had been allocated for 505 Squadron in the run up to the Second World War but it was never formed.

No. 505 (Wessex) Squadron was formed in June 2015 as the only RAF reserve squadron in South West England based at RAF St Mawgan in Cornwall. The last reserve squadron based in the South-West was No. 2625 (County of Cornwall) Squadron RAuxAF which disbanded in 2016. The squadron's formation was highlighted in the 'Future Reserves 2020 paper' announced in 2013, which would see the RAuxAF expand its trained strength by around 1,800.

In 2016, the squadron began recruiting, which by this time had become the newest reserve unit in the RAuxAF alongside another seven new squadrons being formed across the UK.

== Role ==
The squadron's current role is as a general support squadron to deploy reservists to support the RAF at home and worldwide. Sitting under No. 2 Group RAF, the squadron is the only unit directly subordinated to the group. According to a FOI(A) request responded to on 8 June 2021, the squadron has shifted to No. 1 Group.

The squadron's first commanding officer was Squadron Leader David Mann.

== Bibliography ==
- "Future Reserves 2020: Delivering the Nation's Security Together" (PDF), United Kingdom Parliamentary Publishings, Ministry of Defence, November 2012, ISBN 978-0101847520
