= Edward Davies (RAF officer) =

Royal Air Force Air Commodore (1899-1974)

- Born: 29 September 1899
- Died: 21 March 1974 (aged 74)
- Military career
- Allegiance: United Kingdom
- Branch: Royal Navy; Royal Air Force
- Service years: 1918–1950
- Rank: Air Commodore
- Commands: No.36 Squadron; Reserve Command; No. 65 Group; RAF East Africa
- Conflicts: World War II
- Awards: Commander of the Order of the British Empire

Air Commodore Edward Dayrell Handley (Peter) Davies CBE (29 September 1899 – 21 March 1974) was a senior Royal Air Force officer who became Acting Air Officer Commanding-in-Chief RAF Reserve Command.

== RAF career ==
Davies became a Probationary Flight Officer with the Royal Naval Air Service before being commissioned in the seaplane branch of the Royal Air Force in October 1918. He became Officer Commanding No.36 Squadron in 1935 and then joined the Air Staff at Headquarters RAF Training Command. He transferred to RAF Technical Training Command shortly after the start of World War II and was made Director of Operations (Torpedoes) at the Air Ministry in 1943. He was briefly Acting Air Officer Commanding-in-Chief at RAF Reserve Command in May 1946 and then became Air Officer Commanding No. 65 Group in 1948 and Air Officer Commanding RAF East Africa in 1949 before retiring on grounds of ill health in 1950.

He was appointed CBE in New Years Honours List 1946.

== Family ==
In 1925 he married a Miss Tudor of Waverley Court in Camberley.

Military offices
Preceded by New Post	Air Officer Commanding-in-Chief Reserve Command; 1 May 1946 – 20 May 1946	Succeeded by Sir Alan Lees
