= No. 1 Air Mobility Wing RAF =

No. 1 Air Mobility Wing RAF United Kingdom Mobile Air Movements Squadron
- Heraldic Badge of the Wing
- Active: 1 October 2006–present (as wing)
- Country: United Kingdom
- Branch: Royal Air Force
- Role: Combat service support
- Size: Wing of three squadrons
- Part of: No. 2 Group RAF
- Garrison/HQ: RAF Brize Norton

No. 1 Air Mobility Wing RAF is a combat service support wing of the British Royal Air Force currently operating as part of No. 2 Group RAF and based at RAF Brize Norton.

== History ==
=== UKMAMS ===
Formed at RAF Abingdon in 1966 as the UK based mobile movements capability. In 1974, following the closure of RAF Abingdon and its consequential hand-over to the British Army, the squadron was moved to RAF Lyneham. At this time, the squadron amalgamated with the existing station movements squadron to provide a dual base and mobile capability.

On 1 October 2006, the squadron was expanded into the No. 1 Air Mobility Wing.

=== Wing ===
In 2012, following the closure of RAF Lyneham, the wing moved to RAF Brize Norton. The wing operates as part of the RAF's A4 (Support) Force, sitting alongside the headquarters of the Air Mobility Force.

No. 1 Air Mobility Wing is a high-readiness air combat service support unit, capable of providing early entry air movements support, both in the United Kingdom and abroad, to operations and exercises. United Kingdom Mobile Air Movements Squadron (UKMAMS) consists of four mobile flights which provide dedicated workforce to meet exercise and operational tasking, both contingent and enduring. The Operational Support Squadron (OSS) provides all logistics support to UKMAMS, plus permanent air movements detachments (PAMDs) at five locations worldwide.

== Structure ==
The structure of the wing is as follows:

- Wing Headquarters.
- Operational Support Squadron.
- United Kingdom Mobile Air Movements Squadron (UKMAMS) (4 x mobile flights).
- Air Movements Squadron (Providing 24/7 cover to handle flights arriving and departing RAF Brize Norton).

== Squadron badges ==
Squadron heraldic badges

Heraldic badge of the United Kingdom Mobile Air Movements Squadron RAF.

Heraldic badge of the Air Movements Squadron RAF.

Heraldic badge of the Operational Support Squadron RAF.
