= Roderick Goodall =

Royal Air Force commander (1947–2021)

Sir Roderick Goodall
- Born: 19 January 1947
- Died: 18 June 2021 (aged 74)
- Military career
- Allegiance: United Kingdom
- Branch: Royal Air Force
- Service years: 1965–2004
- Rank: Air Marshal
- Nickname: Rocky
- Commands: No. 2 Group RAF (1994–96); RAF Bruggen (1987–89); No. 16 Squadron RAF (1983–86)
- Awards: Knight Commander of the Order of the British Empire; Companion of the Order of the Bath; Air Force Cross & Bar

Air Marshal Sir Roderick Harvey Goodall, KBE, CB, AFC & Bar (19 January 1947 – 18 June 2021) was a senior Royal Air Force commander of the late 20th and early 21st century. He commanded the RAF detachment in Bahrain in the lead up to the Gulf War.
