= No. 2 Group RAF =

Royal Air Force operations group

No. 2 Group
- Group badge
- Active: 1918–1920; 1936–1947; 1948–1958; 1993–1996; 2000–present
- Country: United Kingdom
- Branch: Royal Air Force
- Type: Group headquarters
- Role: Air transport, logistics and support
- Headquarters: RAF High Wycombe
- Motto: Vincemus (Latin for 'We will conquer')

Commanders
- Air Officer Commanding: Air Vice-Marshal Jason Lee Appleton

No. 2 Group is a group of the Royal Air Force which was first activated in 1918, served from 1918–20, from 1936 through the Second World War to 1947, from 1948 to 1958, from 1993 to 1996, was reactivated in 2000, and from 2023 reports to the RAF's Air and Space Commander, a three-star air marshal.

The group is sometimes referred to as the Air Combat Support Group, as it controls the aircraft used to support the Royal Navy and RAF's front line combat force. Assets under command includes the Strategic and Tactical Air Transport aircraft (including VIP/Communication), the RAF Police, field squadrons of the RAF Regiment, and Air-to-Air Refuelling aircraft. The group headquarters is co-located with the Air and Space Commander's office at RAF High Wycombe in Buckinghamshire.

== History ==
No. 2 Group was originally formed as No. 2 (Training) Group on 1 April 1918 at Oxford. The unit was disbanded at RAF Uxbridge on 31 March 1920 as the need for training had lessened following the armistice.

The Group was reformed as No. 2 (Bombing) Group on 20 March 1936, with its headquarters base at Abingdon in Oxfordshire. By the outbreak of war Group Headquarters were at RAF Wyton, Cambridgeshire and composed of the following squadrons and Wings; Nos. 18 and 57 Squadrons (composing 70 Wing at RAF Upper Heyford Oxfordshire); Nos. 21 and 82 Squadrons (79 Wing, RAF Watton, Norfolk) Nos. 90 and 101 Squadrons (81 Wing, RAF West Raynham Norfolk), Nos. 114 and 139 Squadrons (82 Wing, Wyton) and Nos. 107 and 110 Squadrons (83 Wing, RAF Wattisham Suffolk)

79, 81, 82 and 83 Wings formed part of the Advanced Air Striking Force, and 70 Wing was earmarked for service with the Field Force in France. The force consisted of Bristol Blenheim Mk. IVs and the Blenheim Mk. I. On 3 September 1939, the day war broke out, a Blenheim from 2 Group made the first British operational sortie to cross the German frontier in the Second World War. The following day saw the Group's Blenheims make the first British bombing attack of the war. In April 1940, Norway was invaded by the Germans. In response to a request for air support two Blenheim squadrons, Nos. 110 and 107, were placed on temporary detachment to RAF Lossiemouth in Moray, from where they could attack shipping and the German held airfield at Stavanger in southern Norway.

The Group carried out intensive operations against the advancing Germans in the Battle of France following their breakthrough of 10 May 1940, suffering heavy losses. On 17 May, twelve crews of No. 82 Squadron left Watton to attack enemy columns near Gembloux. A severe flak barrage split the formation up, allowing Messerschmitt Bf 109s to attack. Only one Blenheim managed to return to Watton, the rest being shot down; 82 Squadron was operational three days later. During June, Blenheims began a new phase by bombing Luftwaffe airfields in France. In July the twelve Blenheim squadrons of 2 Group lost 31 aircraft, along with three wing commanders. During the summer the light bomber force also supported defensive operations during the Battle of Britain, bombing German invasion barges being concentrated in the Channel ports.

As Bomber Command commenced on its night offensive against Germany, 2 Group was set aside to engage in daylight raids on shipping, coastal ports and other targets across the channel in Occupied Europe. At that stage of the war the Group's Blenheims were near obsolete and suffering many casualties. Operations continued unabated under Air Vice-Marshal D. F. Stevenson, a man who was infamous throughout the RAF at the time for his ruthless aggression, his ambition and his lack of concern for the losses suffered by his crews. Even Churchill was greatly disturbed by the losses on the attacks Stevenson was ordering his crews to fly. Upon his removal as Air Officer Commanding (AOC) in December 1941 his crews were greatly relieved.

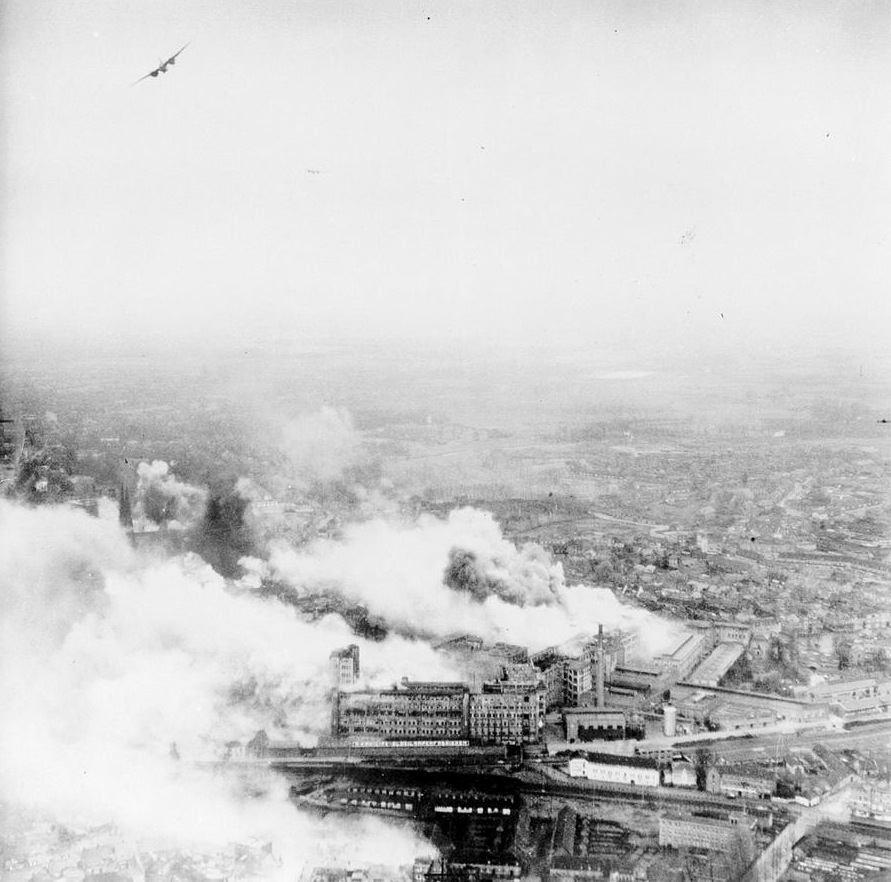
Operation Oyster on Philips Eindhoven, 1942

No. 2 Group carried out a low-level attack on Bremen on 2 July 1941 in which the leader, Wing Commander Hughie Edwards of No. 105 Squadron, won the Victoria Cross. 2 Group supported the ill-fated Dieppe Raid in August 1942. Mosquito B Mk IVs also made the first daylight attack on Berlin.

On 6 December 1942 James Pelly-Fry led 2 Group's Operation Oyster daylight raid on the Philips electrical works at Eindhoven in the Netherlands. Eight of 2 Group's squadrons were committed to the raid, which was complicated by the need to use three types of bomber aircraft to get an adequate bomb load to the target. The raid involved the use of de Havilland Mosquitos, Douglas Bostons and Lockheed Venturas. Losses to 2 Group were severe, with 14 aircraft brought down by flak and enemy fighters, a 20 per cent loss rate. Three more aircraft crash-landed on returning to England; fifty-seven aircraft had been damaged and needed repairs. The raid wrought great destruction the Philips works, which did not return to production of radio tubes and other electronic equipment for six months. Casualties suffered by the Dutch workers and civilian population, though substantial, were significantly less than what would have occurred if the mission had been attempted by the heavy bombers in a night raid.

At the end of May 1943 the Group left RAF Bomber Command to join the new Second Tactical Air Force, and came under Fighter Command control until the formation of the Allied Expeditionary Air Force five months later. 2 Group Mosquitos also made Operation Jericho the famous wall-breaching operation against Amiens gaol in early 1944 which cost Group Captain Charles Pickard (of Target for Tonight film fame) his life. By the Normandy landings on D-day, No. 2 Group consisted of four wings of Douglas Bostons, North American Mitchells, and Mosquito light and medium bombers. During Operation Market Garden in September 1944 the Group included 136, 138, and 140 Wings, flying Mosquitos. and 137 & 139 Wings, flying the Mitchell. No. 2 Group flew just over 57,000 operational sorties at a cost of 2,671 men killed or missing and 396 wounded.

The group was disbanded on 1 May 1947 and reformed on 1 December 1948 within the British Air Force of Occupation. It was transferred again to Second Tactical Air Force on 1 September 1951. On 1 July 1956, No. 2 Group appeared to encompass wings at RAF Ahlhorn (No. 125 Wing RAF), RAF Fassberg (No. 121 Wing RAF), RAF Gutersloh (No. 551 Wing RAF, under the control of Bomber Command), Jever (No. 122 Wing RAF), RAF Laarbruch (No. 34 Wing RAF), RAF Oldenburg (No. 124 Wing RAF), and RAF Wunstorf (No. 123 Wing RAF). No. 2 Group was disbanded on 15 November 1958.

The group was reformed 1 April 1993 by renaming RAF Germany and was then disbanded on 1 April 1996 with absorption into No. 1 Group RAF. It was reformed on 7 January 2000 to take control of air transport, air-to-air refuelling and airborne early warning within the RAF. The AOC's two principal subordinates were Air Commodore AT/AAR & C3I (directing air transport, AAR, and C3I) and Air Commodore Royal Air Force Regiment & Survive to Operate. On 1 April 2006 it took over the responsibilities of No. 3 Group RAF, which was disbanded.

== Component units ==
As of November 2025, No. 2 Group comprises the following elements and units. Unless indicated otherwise, subordinate units are located at the same location as the unit they report to.

=== Air bases ===
No. 2 Group manages the Air Base Wings at each of the RAF stations which provide the support structures and services required to operate them. Aircraft squadrons are controlled by separate Air Wings at each station.

=== Global Enablement ===
The Global Enablement element of No. 2 Group comprises six elements which support RAF operations:

- No. 90 Signals Unit
- Air Command and Control Force
- Air Security Force
- Combat Readiness Force
- Medical Force
- Support Force

==== No. 90 Signals Unit ====
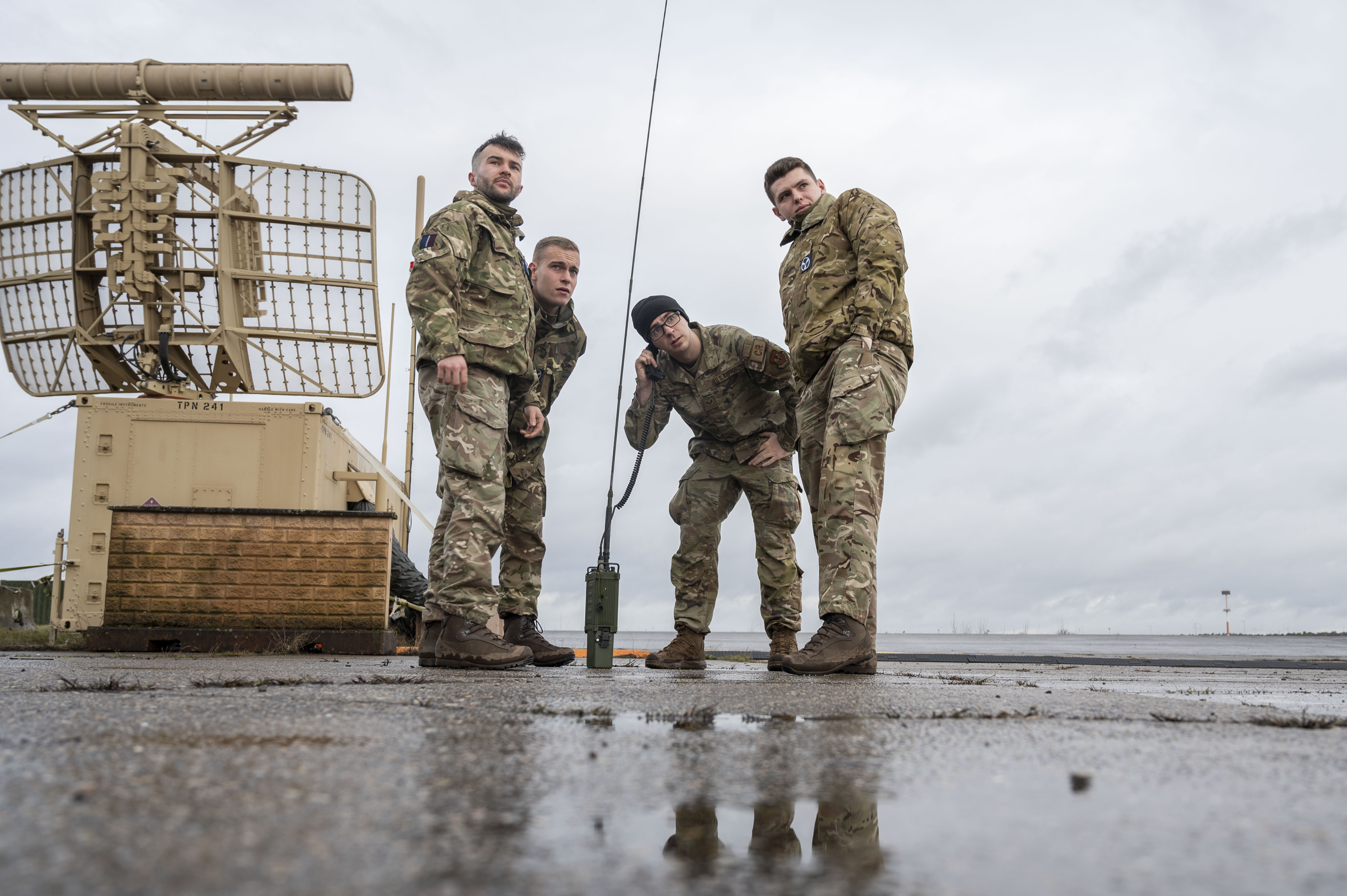
US Air Force and RAF personnel assigned to No. 90 Signals Unit

No. 90 Signals Unit is based at RAF Leeming and provide communications support to the RAF. It comprises the following units:

- Central Pillar
  - Headquarters Squadron
  - Operational Enablement Squadron
- Tactical Communications Wing
  - No. 1 Engineering Support Squadron
  - No. 2 Field Communications Squadron
  - No. 3 Field Communications Squadron
- Operational Information Services Wing
  - No. 4 Capability and Innovation Squadron
  - No. 5 (Information Services) Squadron
  - No. 6 Cyber Reserve Squadron
  - No. 591 Signals Unit (RAF Digby)
  - Capability and Innovation Squadron

==== Air Command and Control Force ====
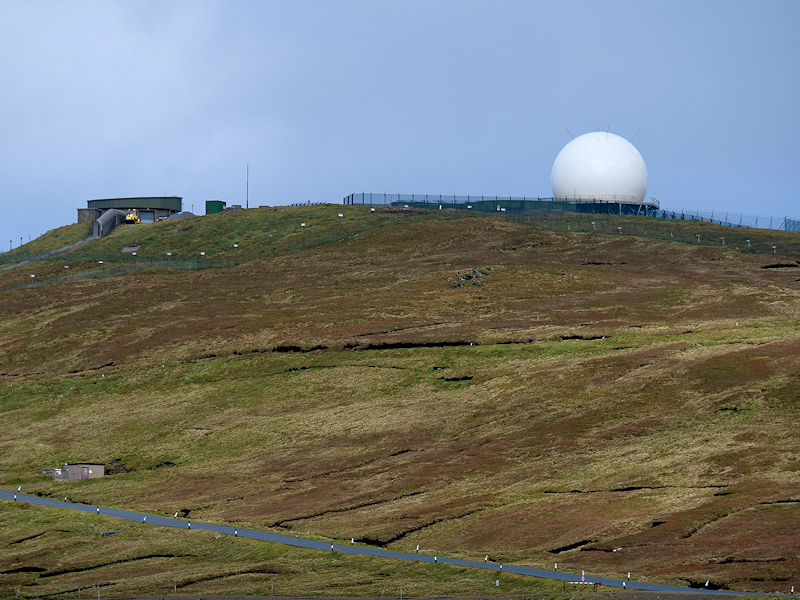
Remote Radar Head Saxa Vord, operated by the RAF's Air Command and Control Force

The Air Command and Control (C2) Force conducts continuous oversight and control of UK air space. It comprises the following units:

- Headquarters Air Command and Control Force (RAF Boulmer)
  - No. 1 Air Control Centre
  - No. 19 Squadron
  - No. 20 Squadron
  - No. 78 Squadron (NATS Swanwick)
  - No. 144 Signals Unit
    - Communications and Information Systems Flight
    - Radar Flight North (RRH Benbecula, RRH Brizlee Wood, RRH Buchan and RRH Saxa Vord)
    - Radar Flight South (RRH Neatishead, RRH Portreath and RRH Staxton Wold)
  - No. 505 (Wessex) Squadron (RAuxAF) (RAF St Mawgan)
  - No. 602 (City of Glasgow) Squadron (RAuxAF) (Glasgow)
  - No. 607 (County of Durham) Squadron (RAuxAF) (RAF Leeming)

==== Air Security Force ====
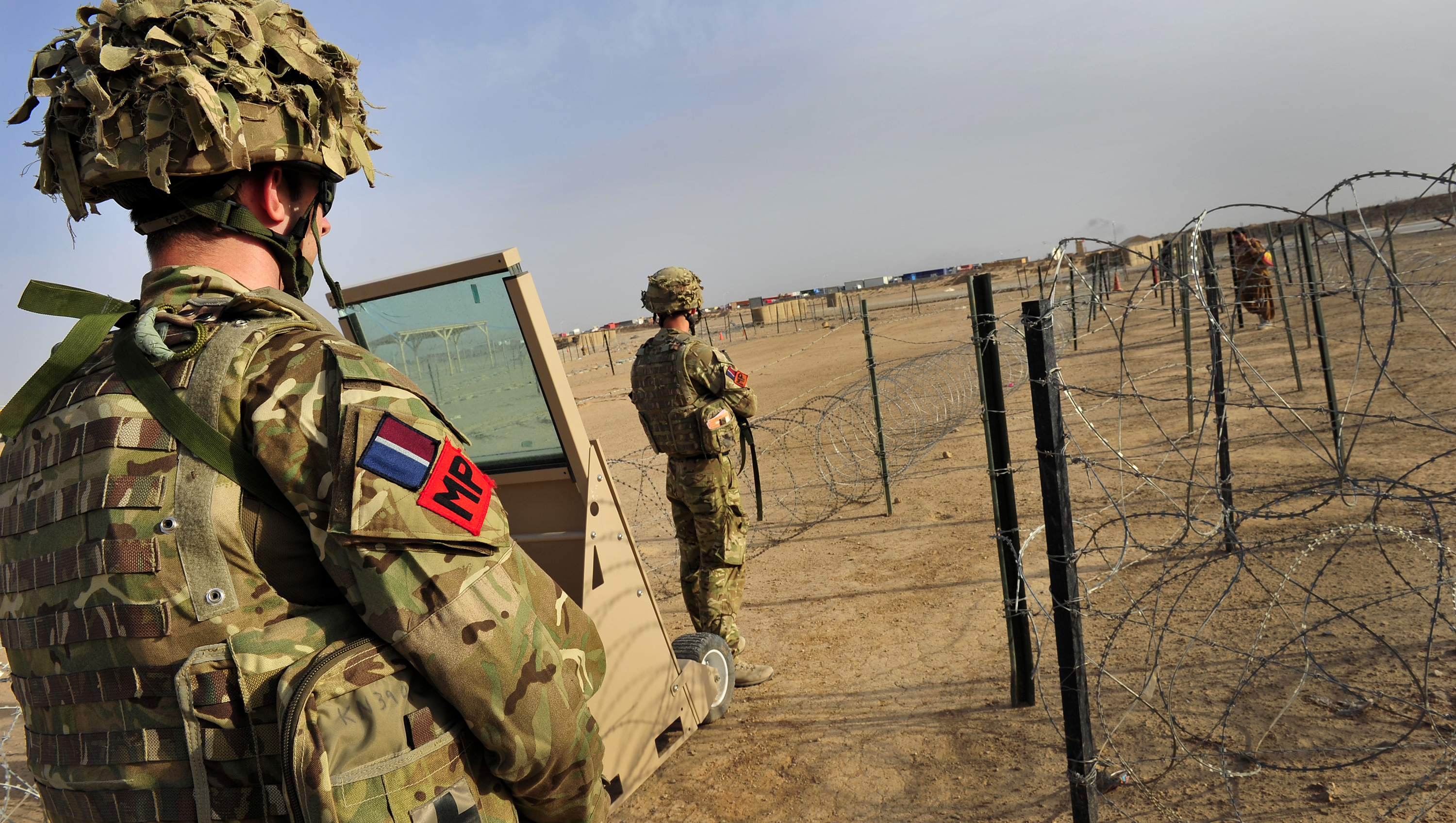
RAF Police personnel, part of the RAF's Air Security Force, guarding the main entry point at Camp Bastion in Afghanistan during Operation Herrick

The Air Security Force comprises the RAF Police, Military Provost Guard Service and civilians who provide policing and security to the RAF. It comprises the following units:

- Headquarters Air Security Force (RAF Honington)
  - No.1 RAF Police Counter Intelligence & Security Wing
    - No. 2 RAF Police Counter Intelligence Squadron
    - No. 3 RAF Police (Reserve) Squadron
    - No. 8 RAF Police & Security Squadron (RAF Cranwell)
      - Flights at RAF Cosford, RAF Halton, RAF Henlow, RAF Honington, RAF Shawbury and RAF Valley
  - No. 2 Police & Security Wing (RAF Waddington)
    - No. 4 RAF Police and Security Squadron (Typhoon) (RAF Lossiemouth)
      - Flights at RAF Coningsby, RAF Leeming and RAF Spadeadam
    - No. 5 RAF Police & Security Squadron (ISTAR) (RAF Waddington)
      - ISTAR Air Wing Security Flight
      - Flight at RAF Wittering
    - No. 6 RAF Police Squadron (F35) (RAF Marham)
    - No. 9 RAF Police & Security Squadron (Air C2 & Space) (RAF Boulmer)
      - Flights at RAF Benson, RAF High Wycombe, RAF Fylingdales, RAF Odiham and RAF St Mawgan
  - No. 3 Police and Security Wing (RAF Brize Norton)
    - No. 1 Tactical Police & Security Squadron
    - No. 7 RAF Police & Security Squadron
      - Flights at RAF Brize Norton, RAF Northolt, and Duke of Gloucester Barracks
  - Specialist Investigations Branch
    - Defence Flying Complaints Investigation Team (RAF Cranwell)
    - Defence Serious Crime Unit (North) RAF Section (RAF Cranwell)
    - Defence Serious Crime Unit (East) RAF Section (RAF Halton)
    - RAF Police Engagement Team (RAF Cranwell)

==== Combat Readiness Force ====
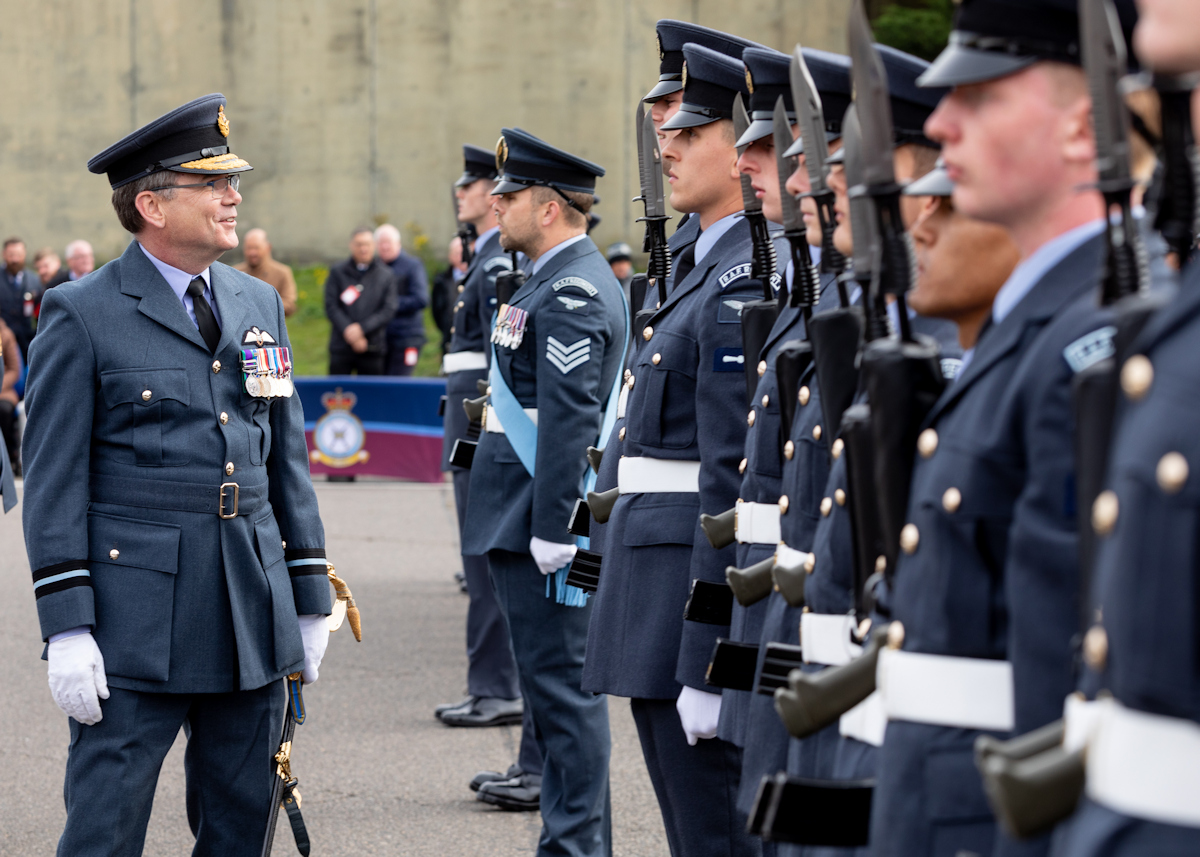
An Air Commodore reviews RAF Regiment graduates following a training course at RAF Honington in 2021

The Combat Readiness Force is responsible for providing protection to the RAF’s personnel, assets and operating environments. It comprises the following units:

- Headquarters Combat Readiness Force (RAF Honington)
  - No. 2 Force Protection (Counter-Uncrewed Aerial Systems) Wing (RAF Leeming)
    - No. 34 Squadron RAF Regiment
    - No. 63 Squadron RAF Regiment (King's Colour Squadron) (RAF Northolt)
    - No. 609 (West Riding) Squadron RAuxAF
  - No. 3 Force Protection Wing (RAF Marham)
    - No. 15 Squadron RAF Regiment
    - No. 2620 (County of Norfolk) Squadron (RAuxAF) Regiment
    - No. 2503 (County of Lincoln) Squadron (RAuxAF) Regiment (RAF Waddington)
  - No. 5 Force Protection Wing (RAF Lossiemouth)
    - No. 51 Squadron RAF Regiment
    - No. 603 (City of Edinburgh) Squadron (RAuxAF) (Edinburgh)
    - No. 2622 (Highland) Squadron (RAuxAF) Regiment
  - No. 7 Force Protection Wing (RAF Coningsby)
    - No. II Squadron RAF Regiment (RAF Brize Norton)
    - No. 2624 (County of Oxfordshire) Squadron (RAuxAF) Regiment (RAF Brize Norton)
    - Air Land Integration (ALI) Cell
    - Tactical Air Traffic Control
  - No. 20 Wing RAF Regiment (RAF Honington)
    - No. 1 Squadron RAF Regiment
    - No. 2623 (East Anglian) Squadron (RAuxAF) Regiment
  - RAF Force Protection Centre (RAF Honington)
    - Air Force Protection Training Squadron
    - Air Force Protection Collective Training Squadron
    - Development Squadron
    - Knowledge Hub
  - RAF Regiment Training Wing (RAF Honington)
    - Regimental Training Squadron (Basics)
    - Regimental Training Squadron (Advanced)
    - RAF Regiment Recruitment & Selection Flight
  - Defence Warning and Reporting Flight (RAF Waddington)

==== Medical Force ====
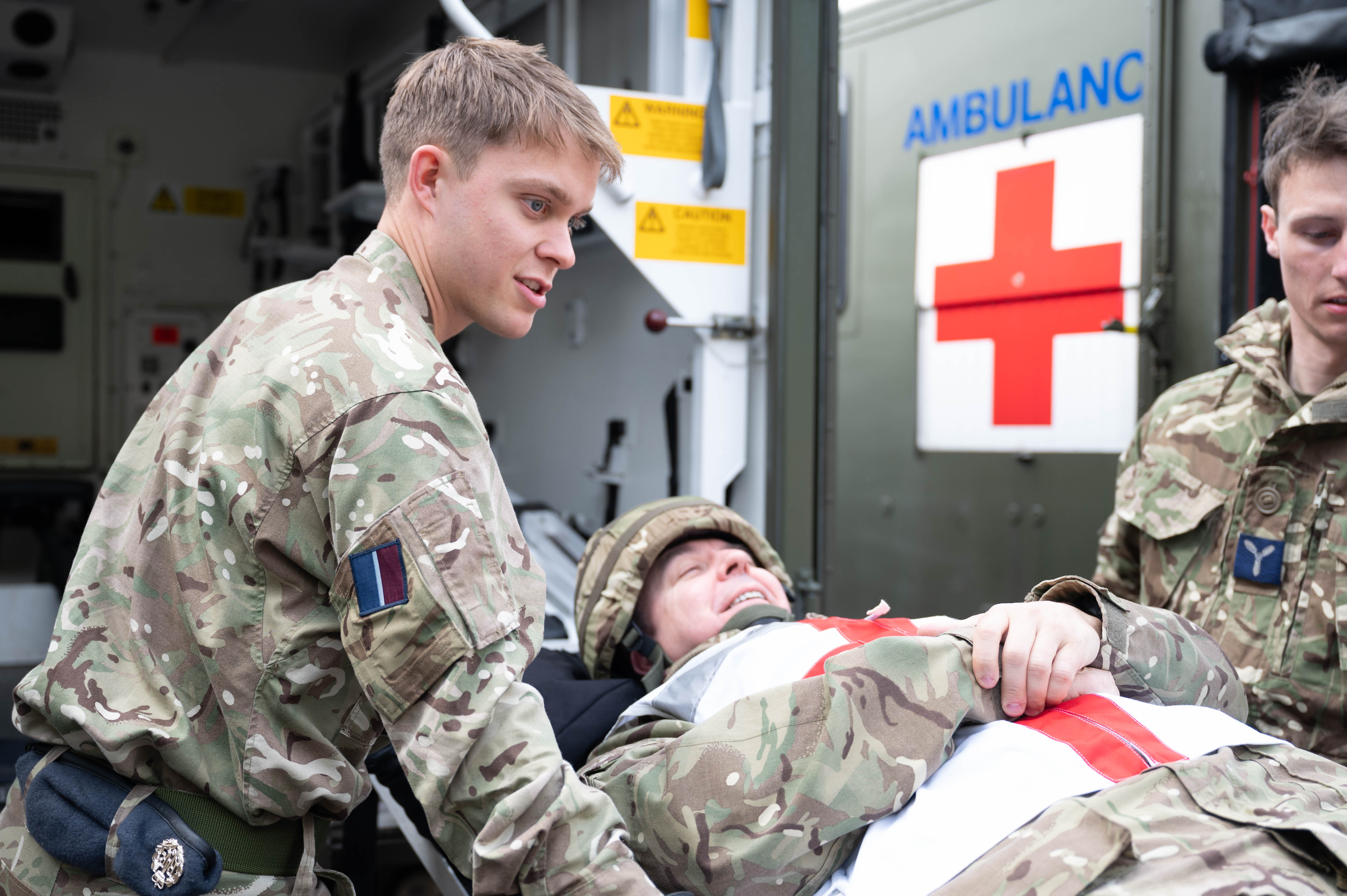
Personnel assigned to No. 612 Squadron of the RAF Medical Force loads a simulated patient into a military ambulance during an exercise at Leuchars Station in 2024

The Medical Force provides an aeromedical evacuation capability, undertakes medical planning and prepares regular and reserve RAF Medical Services personnel and capabilities for deployment. It comprises the following units:

- Medical Force Headquarters (RAF High Wycombe)
  - Tactical Medical Wing (RAF Brize Norton)
  - Medical Reserves Wing (RAF Wittering)
    - No. 504 (County of Nottingham) Squadron (RAuxAF) (JHC FS Aldergrove)
    - No. 612 (County of Aberdeen) Squadron (RAuxAF) (Leuchars Station)
    - No. 4626 (County of Wiltshire) Aeromedical Evacuation Squadron (RAuxAF) (RAF Brize Norton)
  - RAF Centre of Aviation Medicine (RAF Henlow)
    - Aviation Medicine Wing
    - Occupational and Environmental Medicine Wing
    - Support Wing

==== Support Force ====
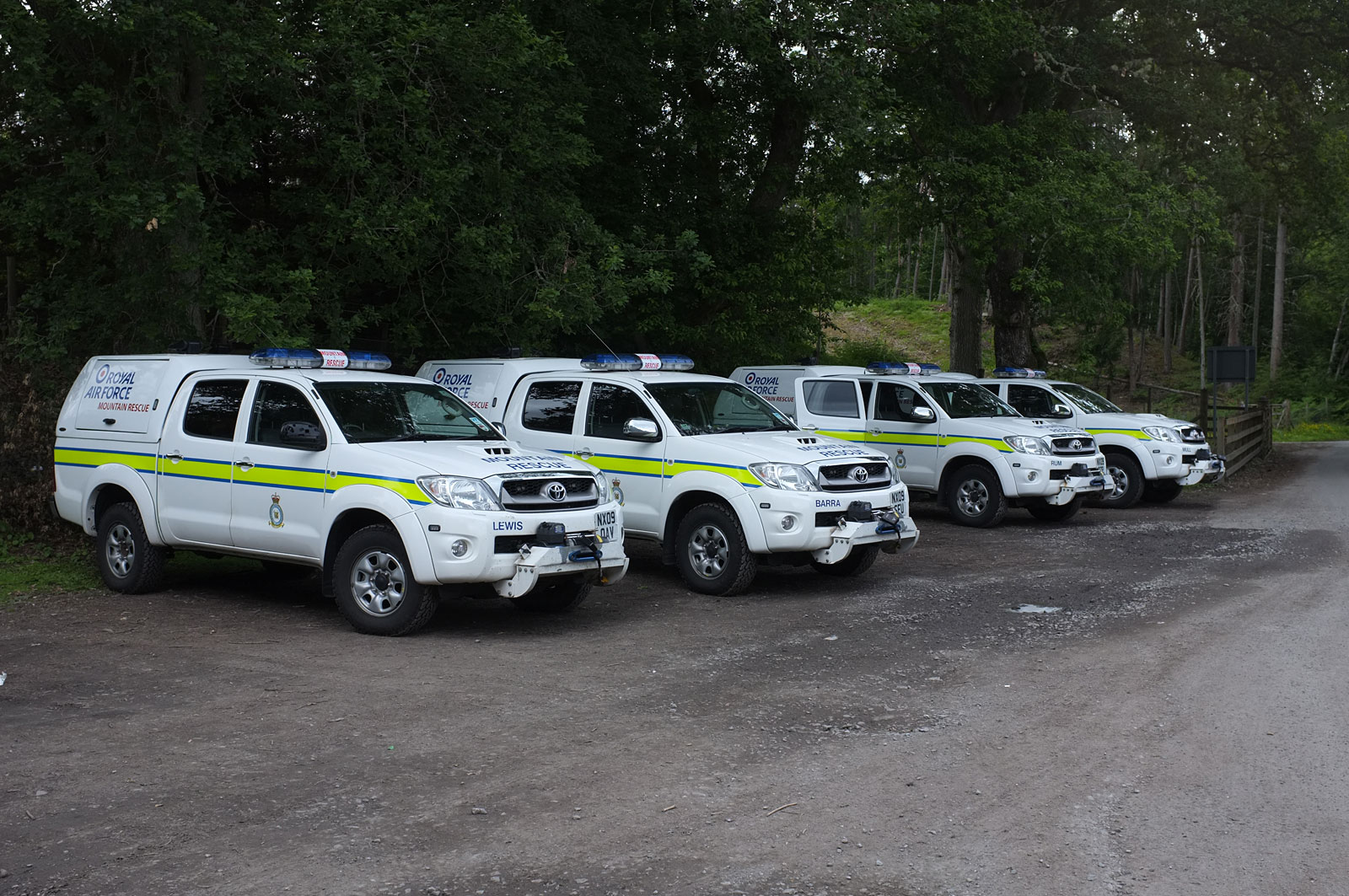
Vehicles of the RAF Mountain Rescue Service, part of the RAF's Support Force

The Support Force provides deployable logistics, engineering and enabling capabilities required to conduct operations and exercises. It is responsible for expeditionary engineering and logistics, supporting reserve capabilities and RAF Music Services. It comprises the following units:

- Headquarters Support Force (RAF Wittering)
  - No. 1 Air Mobility Wing (RAF Brize Norton)
    - Air Movements Squadron
    - Operational Support Squadron
    - Mobile Air Movements Squadron
  - No. 42 (Expeditionary Support) Wing (RAF Wittering)
    - No. 71 (Inspection and Repair) Squadron
    - No. 93 (Expeditionary Armaments) Squadron
    - No. 5001 Squadron
    - Joint Aircraft Recovery and Transportation Squadron
  - No. 85 (Expeditionary Logistics) Wing (RAF Wittering)
    - No. 1 Expeditionary Logistics Squadron
    - No. 2 Mechanical Transport Squadron
    - No. 3 Mobile Catering Squadron
    - RAF Mountain Rescue Service (RAF Valley)
      - RAF Leeming Mountain Rescue Team (RAF Leeming)
      - RAF Lossiemouth Mountain Rescue Team (RAF Lossiemouth)
      - RAF Valley Mountain Rescue Team (RAF Valley)
  - RAF Music Services (RAF Northolt)
    - Band of the RAF College (RAF Cranwell
    - Band of the RAF Regiment
    - Band of the Royal Auxiliary Air Force (RAF Cranwell)
    - Central Band of the RAF
    - RAF Salon Orchestra
    - RAF Squadronaires
    - RAF Swing Wing (RAF Cranwell)
  - Reserves Logistics Support Wing
    - No. 501 (County of Gloucester) Squadron (RAuxAF) (RAF Brize Norton)
    - No. 504 (County of Nottingham) Squadron (RAuxAF) (RAF Wittering)
    - No. 605 (County of Warwick) Squadron (RAuxAF) (RAF Cosford)
  - No. 4624 (County of Oxford) Squadron (RAuxAF) (RAF Brize Norton)

== Heritage ==
The group's badge features an eagle perched on a helmet, with wings expanded. It is symbolic of the group's historic co-operation and close alliance with the army. The badge was awarded in May 1952.

The group's motto is Vincemus (Latin for 'We will conquer').

== Commanders ==
=== 1918 to 1920 ===
- 1 April 1918 Lieutenant Colonel Wilfrid Freeman

=== 1936 to 1947 ===
- 1936 Air Commodore Bertine Sutton
- 1 September 1936 Air Commodore Stanley Goble (RAAF)
- 2 December 1937 Air Commodore Charles Blount
- 16 May 1938 Air Vice-Marshal Cuthbert MacLean
- 17 April 1940 Air Vice-Marshal James Robb
- 12 February 1941 Air Vice-Marshal D F Stevenson
- 17 December 1941 Air Vice-Marshal Alan Lees
- 29 December 1942 Air Vice-Marshal John D'Albiac
- 1 June 1943 Air Vice-Marshal Basil Embry
- 8 August 1945 Air Vice-Marshal P E Maitland
- 18 March 1946 Air Commodore Leslie William Cannon
- 3 June 1946 Air Vice-Marshal A L Paxton

=== 1948 to 1958 ===
- 1 December 1948 Air Commodore Laurence Frank Sinclair
- 16 January 1950 Air Commodore The Earl of Bandon
- 18 June 1951 Air Commodore Hector McGregor
- 9 November 1953 Air Vice-Marshal J R Hallings-Pott
- 1 July 1955 Air Vice-Marshal S R Ubee

=== 1993 to 1996 ===
- 1 April 1993 Air Vice-Marshal Graeme Robertson
- 17 January 1994 Air Vice-Marshal Roderick Goodall

=== 2000 to present ===
- 1 April 2000 Air Vice-Marshal K D Filbey
- 2 August 2002 Air Vice-Marshal Nigel Maddox
- January 2005 Air Vice-Marshal Iain McNicoll
- 9 February 2007 Air Vice-Marshal Andrew Pulford
- 16 September 2008 Air Vice-Marshal Stephen Hillier
- October 2010 Air Vice-Marshal Philip Osborn
- 18 January 2013 Air Vice-Marshal Sean Reynolds
- July 2015 Air Vice-Marshal Gavin Parker
- June 2017 Air Vice Marshal David Cooper
- September 2019 Air Vice-Marshal Alan Gillespie
- October 2021 Air Vice-Marshal Suraya Marshall
- February 2024 Air Vice-Marshal Jason Appleton

== See also ==
- List of Royal Air Force groups
