= No. 222 Group RAF =

Former Royal Air Force operations group

No. 222 Group
- Active: 1 September 1941 – 15 October 1945
- Country: United Kingdom
- Branch: Royal Air Force
- Type: Royal Air Force group
- Part of: Air Forces in India (RAF)

No. 222 Group was a group of the Royal Air Force during the Second World War. Formed on 1 September 1941, based at Ceylon. Squadrons were stationed around the Indian Ocean. The group undertook long-range bombing and mine-laying operations that took them as far afield as Sumatra and Singapore.

When it became clear that Japanese forces posed an imminent threat to Ceylon, the airfield at Ratmalana was requisitioned to form part of the air defences for Colombo. It opened as RAF Ratmalana on March 1, 1942, when No. 258 Squadron RAF was reformed. They were followed by the arrival of No. 30 Squadron RAF. RAF Station Ratmalana closed in October 1945.

No. 99 Squadron RAF (Liberators) was based at Dhubulia in West Bengal from August 1944 - August 1945. It then moved to the Cocos Islands.

The group was disbanded on 15 October 1945 becoming Air Headquarters Ceylon (AHQ Ceylon). It had inherited six Liberator squadrons (Nos 99, 356, 203, 8, 160, and 321 RNLAF); four Sunderland squadrons (No. 205, 209, No. 230 at RAF Koggala on the southern tip of the island, and No. 240 Squadron RAF); and No. 136 Squadron RAF with Spitfires (Lee, Eastward).

In turn, AHQ Ceylon was disbanded on 1 November 1957 as RAF installations in Ceylon were handed over to the Royal Ceylon Air Force. AHQ Ceylon was a sub-formation of Far East Air Force. (Flight)

== Squadrons ==
The following squadrons formed part of No. 222 Group.

- No. 17 Squadron (Spitfire)
- No. 273 Squadron (Spitfire)
- No. 205 Squadron (Catalina)
- No. 209 Squadron (Catalina)
- No. 259 Squadron (Catalina)
- No. 262 Squadron (Catalina)
- No. 265 Squadron (Catalina)
- No. 321 Squadron (Catalina)
- No. 413 Squadron RCAF (Catalina)
- No. 230 Squadron (Sunderland)
- No. 89 Squadron (Beaufighter) - Nightfighter
- No. 22 Squadron (Beaufighter) - Torpedo Bomber
- No. 160 Squadron (B-24 Liberator)
- No. 217 Squadron (Beaufort)
- No. 135 Squadron (P-47 Thunderbolt)
- No. 232 Squadron (Ventura)
- No. 83 Squadron (Wellington)
- No. 244 Squadron (Wellington)
- No. 621 Squadron (Wellington)

== See also ==
- List of Royal Air Force groups
