= RAF Signals Command =

Former command of the Royal Air Force

Royal Air Force Signals Command
- RAF Signals Command badge
- Active: 3 November 1958–1 January 1969
- Country: United Kingdom
- Branch: Royal Air Force
- Type: Command
- Role: controlling Signals activity
- Mottos: Aetherem Vincere; Latin: To conquer the upper air

Signals Command was the British Royal Air Force's command responsible for control of signals units from 1958 to 1969. It was based at RAF Medmenham near Marlow, Buckinghamshire.

== History ==
Originally, on 24 April 1946, No. 90 (Signals) Group RAF was formed at Danesfield Court, Medmenham, Marlow, taking over the functions of No 26, 60 (the home air defence radar stations, originally Chain Home and Chain Home Low) and 100 Groups (airborne electronic warfare) and No. 80 Wing RAF (electronic warfare).

Signals Command was formed on 3 November 1958 by raising 90 Group to Command status.

Three De Havilland Comet 2s were modified for RAF use in radar and electronic systems development, initially assigned to No. 90 Group (later Signals Command). In service with No. 192 and No. 51 Squadrons, the 2R series was equipped to monitor Warsaw Pact signal traffic and operated in this role from 1958. The 2R ELINT series was operational until 1974, when replaced by the Nimrod R1, the last Comet derivative in RAF service.

Signals Command was relatively short-lived, lasting only until 1 January 1969, when it was absorbed by Strike Command by being reduced to group status. It had five Air Officers Commanding during its existence.

In 2006, various elements of the RAF Signals trades and sections were combined at RAF Leeming to form No. 90 Signals Unit with the same badge and motto as No. 90 (Signals) Group and Signals Command.

== Aircraft ==
- Avro Lincoln Mk.4
  - No. 116 Squadron RAF
  - No. 151 Squadron RAF
  - No. 192 Squadron RAF
  - No. 199 Squadron RAF
  - No. 527 Squadron RAF

== Commanders in Chief ==
- 3 November 1958 - Air Vice-Marshal Sir Leslie Dalton-Morris
- 1 March 1961 - Air Vice-Marshal A Foord-Kelcey (temporary appointment)
- 9 June 1961 - Air Vice-Marshal Sir Walter Pretty
- 1 February 1964 - Air Vice-Marshal Sir Thomas Shirley
- 7 May 1966 - Air Vice-Marshal Sir Benjamin Ball

== See also ==
- List of communications units and formations of the Royal Air Force
- List of Royal Air Force commands

Preceded by No. 90 (Signals) Group RAF; Group raised to command status	Signals Command; 1958–1969	Succeeded by Strike Command
