= List of communications units and formations of the Royal Air Force =

This is a list of military communications ('Signals') units and formations of the Royal Air Force.

In the Royal Air Force sense, wings, groups, and commands can be considered formations. A formation is defined by the US Department of Defense as "two or more aircraft, ships, or units proceeding together under a commander". "Formations are those military organisations which are formed from different speciality Arms and Services troop units to create a balanced, combined combat force."

Higher level communications formations in the Royal Air Force included RAF Signals Command, which was later reduced to group status and incorporated into RAF Strike Command. Nos 26 and No. 60 Group RAF were established in the 1940s. No. 26 Group was reformed on 12 February 1940 within RAF Training Command, and transferred to RAF Technical Training Command on 27 May 1940. It was transferred to RAF Bomber Command on 10 February 1942, and then amalgamated with No. 60 (Signals) Group to form No. 90 (Signals) Group RAF on 25 April 1946.

The Radio Warfare Establishment (RWE) was established 21 July 1945 at RAF Swanton Morley, and later became the Central Signals Establishment (CSE). The CSE was formed 1 September 1946 at RAF Watton, equipped with Dominie and Tiger Moth, and disbanded there on 1 July 1965. When the establishment disbanded, the Research Wing and civilian parts of the "..Installation Squadron became the RAF Signals Command Air Radio Laboratories, and the training and service elements of Installation Squadron became the EW Support Wing." Many files regarding the CSE are accessible in the National Archives at Kew .

== Radio units and formations ==
=== Radio Establishment ===
Name	Formed	Location	Aircraft	Disbanded at	Disbanded	Unit became
Radio Warfare Establishment	21 July 1945	Swanton Morley	Fortress; Halifax	Watton	1 September 1946	Central Signals Establishment

=== Radio Schools ===
Name	Formed	Location	Aircraft	Disbanded at	Disbanded	Unit became
1 Radio School	10 March 1941	Cranwell	Botha; Proctor			Active, at RAF Cosford and RAF Digby.
2 Radio School	18 January 1940	Yatesbury	Tiger Moth; Botha	Yatesbury	31 October 1965	Disbanded
3 Radio School	27 December 1940	Prestwick	Audax; Blenheim	Compton Basset	30 November 1964	Disbanded
4 Radio School	1 January 1943	Madley	Dominie; Proctor	Swanton Morley	1 May 1951	No. 1 Air Signallers School RAF
6 Radio School	1 January 1943	Bolton	Blenheim; Tiger Moth	Cranwell	1 December 1952	Absorbed by 1 Radio School
9 Radio School		Yatesbury		Yatesbury		Disbanded
10 Radio School	1 January 1943	Carew Cheriton	Anson; Oxford	Carew Cheriton	24 November 1945	Disbanded
11 Radio School	11 December 1942	Hooton Park	Botha; Anson	Hooton Park	31 August 1944	Disbanded
12 Radio School	17 July 1943	St Athan	Proctor; Anson	St Athan	7 March 1946	Empire Radio School
14 Radio School	1 June 1944	St Athan	Proctor; Anson	Debden	7 March 1946	Empire Radio School
3 Radio Direction Finding School	19 August 1942	Prestwick	Hart; Botha	Hooton Park	13 December 1942	11 Radio School
9 Radio Direction Finding School	1942	Yatesbury		Yatesbury		Absorbed by 9 Radio School
Empire Radio School	7 March 1946	Debden	Tiger Moth; Proctor	Debden	20 October 1949	Royal Air Force Technical College, Signals Division

=== Radio Flights ===
Name	Formed	Location	Aircraft	Disbanded at	Disbanded	Unit became
Radio Development Flight	December 1942	Drem	Defiant; Beaufighter	Drem	1 June 1943	1692 (Special Duties) Flight
1 Radio Maintenance Unit Calibration Flight	1 July 1940	Wick	Hornet Moth; Blenheim	N/A	16 October 1940	1 Radio Servicing Section Calibration Flight
2 Radio Maintenance Unit Calibration Flight	1 July 1940	Dyce	Hornet Moth; Blenheim	N/A	16 October 1940	2 Radio Servicing Section Calibration Flight
3 Radio Maintenance Unit Calibration Flight	1 July 1940	Usworth	Hornet Moth; Blenheim	N/A	16 October 1940	3 Radio Servicing Section Calibration Flight
4 Radio Maintenance Unit Calibration Flight	1 July 1940	Church Fenton	Hornet Moth; Blenheim	N/A	16 October 1940	4 Radio Servicing Section Calibration Flight
5 Radio Maintenance Unit Calibration Flight	1 July 1940	Duxford	Hornet Moth; Blenheim	N/A	16 October 1940	5 Radio Servicing Section Calibration Flight
6 Radio Maintenance Unit Calibration Flight	1 July 1940	Biggin Hill	Hornet Moth; Blenheim	N/A	16 October 1940	6 Radio Servicing Section Calibration Flight
7 Radio Maintenance Unit Calibration Flight	15 July 1940	Filton	Hornet Moth	N/A	16 October 1940	7 Radio Servicing Section Calibration Flight
8 Radio Maintenance Unit Calibration Flight	1 July 1940	Speke	Hornet Moth; Blenheim	N/A	16 October 1940	8 Radio Servicing Section Calibration Flight
1 Radio Servicing Section Calibration Flight	16 October 1940	N/A	Hornet Moth; Blenheim	Longman	16 February 1941	70 Wing Calibration Flight
2 Radio Servicing Section Calibration Flight	16 October 1940	N/A	Hornet Moth; Blenheim	Dyce	16 February 1941	71 Wing Calibration Flight
3 Radio Servicing Section Calibration Flight	16 October 1940	N/A	Hornet Moth; Blenheim	Usworth	16 February 1941	72 Wing Calibration Flight
4 Radio Servicing Section Calibration Flight	16 October 1940	N/A	Hornet Moth; Blenheim	Church Fenton	16 February 1941	73 Wing Calibration Flight
5 Radio Servicing Section Calibration Flight	16 October 1940	N/A	Hornet Moth; Blenheim	Duxford	16 February 1941	74 Wing Calibration Flight
6 Radio Servicing Section Calibration Flight	16 October 1940	N/A	Hornet Moth; Blenheim	Biggin Hill	16 February 1941	75 Wing Calibration Flight
7 Radio Servicing Section Calibration Flight	16 October 1940	N/A	Hornet Moth	Filton	16 February 1941	76 Wing Calibration Flight
8 Radio Servicing Section Calibration Flight	16 October 1940	N/A	Hornet Moth; Blenheim	Speke	16 February 1941	77 Wing Calibration Flight

== Signals units and formations ==
=== Wings ===
Name	Formed	Location	Disbanded at	Disbanded	Notes
No. 33 Wing RAF	7 December 1944	Mechelen, Belgium		30 May 1945	
No. 69 Wing RAF	15 March 1945	Everberg		20 October 1945	
No. 70 Wing RAF	1 July 1940	Wick		31 May 1946	
No. 71 Wing RAF	31 July 1940	Dyce		July 1943	
No. 72 Wing RAF	1 July 1940	Usworth		31 July 1946	
No. 73 Wing RAF	1 July 1940	Church Fenton		1 November 1946	
No. 74 Wing RAF	1 July 1940	Duxford		1 July 1943	
No. 75 Wing RAF	1 July 1940	Biggin Hill		1 November 1946	
No. 76 Wing RAF	10 July 1940	Filton		1 July 1941	
No. 77 Wing RAF	17 February 1941	Liverpool		15 March 1944	
No. 78 Wing RAF	25 April 1941	Henbury		31 July 1946	
No. 79 Wing RAF	27 September 1941	Portadown		July 1943	
No. 80 Wing RAF	7 September 1940	Radlett		24 September 1945	
No. 81 Wing RAF	2 June 1941	Worcester		30 April 1946	
No. 84 Wing RAF	June 1943	Bartway		September 1944	
No. 164 Wing RAF	4 May 1942	Newbold Revel, India		30 April 1945	
No. 180 Wing RAF	9 June 1943	Calcutta, India		30 December 1945	
No. 181 Wing RAF	9 June 1943	Masinpur, India		10 March 1946	
No. 182 Wing RAF	1 August 1943	Chittagong, India		1 August 1945	
No. 183 Wing RAF	1 January 1944	Ridgeway, Ceylon		30 December 1945	
No. 250 Wing RAF	25 August 1939	Ismailia, Egypt		6 December 1942	
No. 276 Wing RAF	1 August 1942	Heliopolis		31 August 1945	
No. 296 Wing RAF	17 February 1942	Freetown, West Africa		30 April 1943	
No. 329 Wing RAF	July 1943	Algiers		23 November 1943	

=== Squadrons ===
Name	Formed	Location	Aircraft	Disbanded at	Disbanded	Unit became
Signals Command Development Squadron	N/A	Watton	Lincoln; Hastings	Watton	1 January 1962	No. 151 Squadron RAF
Signals Squadron	4 January 1942	Kabrit	Wellington	Kabrit	1 March 1942	No. 162 Squadron RAF

=== Units ===
Name	Formed	Location	Disbanded at	Disbanded	Notes
No. 1 Signals Unit RAF	Unknown	RAF Bampton Castle? 1994	Unknown	Unknown	RAF Rudloe Manor 1995
No. 2 Signals Unit RAF	Unknown	RAF Stanbridge	Unknown	Unknown	RAF Bampton Castle 1995
No. 6 Signals Unit RAF	Unknown	Unknown	RAF Rudloe Manor	14 October 1994	
No. 7 Signals Unit RAF	Unknown	Byron Heights, West Falkland	Unknown	Unknown	With British Forces South Atlantic Islands. Previously Kormakiti, Cyprus, from at least 1956 Sept-1959 Feb.
No. 9 Signals Unit RAF	Unknown	RAF Boddington	Unknown	Unknown	RAF Boddington 1995 RAF Boddington became No. 9 Signals Unit on 1 October 1978. Now ISS Boddington.
No. 11 Signals Unit RAF	Unknown	RAF Rheindahlen	Unknown	Unknown	RAF Rheindahlen, Monchengladbach 1975–1980; still at Rheindahlen 1989
No. 12 Signals Unit RAF	1 June 1969	RAF Episkopi?	Unknown	1 July 2002	RAF Episkopi 1995
No. 26 Signals Unit RAF	Unknown	RAF Gatow, 1989	RAF Gatow	30 November 1994	No. 5 (Signals) Wing RAF, RAF Hambuhren 23 Feb 1953 - 30 Jul 1955 and RAF Butzweilerhof 12 August 1958 - September 1966, was redesignated No. 26 Signals Unit at RAF Butzweilerhof some time in the 1961-66 time period. RAF Gatow was closed in 1994.
No. 33 Signals Unit RAF	Unknown	Unknown	Unknown	Unknown	RAF Ayios Nikolaos 1995
No. 50 Signals Unit RAF	Unknown	Unknown	Unknown	Unknown	
No. 54 Signals Unit RAF	Unknown	RAF Digby, present			Taunton Barracks, Celle, Bergen-Hohne Garrison, 1989. Reformed at RAF Digby in 2014 as part of No. 1 Intelligence, Surveillance, and Reconnaissance Wing RAF in the electronic warfare role.
No. 59 Signals Unit RAF	Unknown	Unknown	Unknown	Unknown	
No. 71 Signals Unit RAF	Unknown	RAF Benbecula, 1994	Unknown	Unknown	
No. 75 Signals Unit RAF	Unknown	Unknown	Unknown	Unknown	Present at RAF Boulmer on 1 October 1994.
No. 81 Signals Unit RAF	Unknown	RAF Bampton Castle, 1994	Unknown	Unknown	RAF Bampton Castle 1995
No. 86 Signals Unit RAF	Unknown	Unknown	Unknown	Unknown	RAF Neatishead 1995
No. 90 Signals Unit RAF	26 April 1946 1 April 2006	RAF Medmenham, 1946 RAF Leeming, present			Nil No. 90 Signals Unit was reformed on 1 April 2006 at RAF Leeming.
No. 91 Signals Unit RAF	27 September 1957	RAF Saxa Vord	RAF Saxa Vord	September 1984	No. 91 Signals Unit officially formed up at Saxa Vord in September 1957, was declared operational on 5 October 1957, and in 1960 was visited by Queen Elizabeth II.
No. 101 Signals Unit RAF	Unknown	Unknown	Unknown	Unknown	
No. 112 Signals Unit RAF	Unknown	Unknown	Unknown	1983	
No. 117 Signals Unit RAF	Unknown	Tai-Mo-Shan	Hong Kong	Unknown	
No. 123 Signals Unit RAF	Unknown	HMS Jufair	Bahrain	Unknown	
No. 129 Signals Unit RAF	Unknown	Unknown	Unknown	Unknown	RAF Staxton Wold 1995
No. 140 Signals Unit RAF	April 1961	RAF Butzweilerhof	Unknown	Unknown	Formed from No. 1 (Signals) Wing RAF to control Gee (navigation) and Decca Navigator System chains
No. 144 Signals Unit RAF	1951 November 2023	RAF Bawdsey, 1953-1958 RAF Boulmer, present			144 SU was formed in 1951 at RAF Bawdsey (1953-1958), 144 SU has also been stationed at RAF Wattisham and finally at RAF Ty Croes between 1991 and 1995. Reformed November 2023 at RAF Boulmer.
No. 146 Signals Unit RAF	Unknown	Unknown	Unknown	Unknown	RAF Staxton Wold 1995
No. 170 Signals Unit RAF	Unknown	Unknown	Unknown	Unknown	RAF Buchan 1995
No. 235 Signals Unit RAF	Unknown	Unknown	Unknown	Unknown	
No. 244 Signals Unit RAF	Unknown	Unknown	Unknown	Unknown	
No. 259 Signals Unit RAF	Unknown	Unknown	Unknown	Unknown	Amalgamated with No. 330 SU and No. 953 SU as No. 330 SU May 1958-September 1961 as part of Gee (navigation) chain.
No. 264 Signals Unit RAF	Unknown	Unknown	Unknown	Unknown	
No. 266 Signals Unit RAF	Unknown	RAF Butzweilerhof	Unknown	Unknown	
No. 271 Signals Unit RAF	Unknown	Unknown	Unknown	Unknown	
No. 276 Signals Unit RAF	Unknown	RAF Habbaniya, Iraq	Unknown	Unknown	Ran large SIGINT monitoring station for GCHQ.
No. 280 Signals Unit RAF	25 June 1956	Akrotiri	Troodos	31 March 1994	Subsumed into Joint Services Signals Unit
No. 284 Signals Unit RAF	Unknown	RAF Butzweilerhof	Unknown	Unknown	
No. 291 Signals Unit RAF	Unknown	RAF Hambuhren	Unknown	Unknown	RAF Hambuhren 23 Feb 1953-30 Jul 1955.
No. 303 Signals Unit RAF	Unknown	Unknown	Unknown	Unknown	Mount Kent, Falkland Islands, 1995. The hilltop of Mount Kent is occupied by the RRH Mount Kent (Remote Radar Head Mount Kent) of the British Forces South Atlantic Islands (BFSAI), part of an early warning and airspace control network including also RRH Mount Alice and RRH Byron Heights on West Falkland.
No. 330 Signals Unit RAF	May 1958	Ingolstadt	Unknown	Sep 1961	Amalgamation of No. 259 SU, No. 330 SU, and No. 953 SU in Ingolstadt May 1958 as part of Gee (navigation) chain.
No. 336 Signals Unit RAF	Unknown	Unknown	Unknown	Unknown	
No. 367 Signals Unit RAF	Unknown	Unknown	Unknown	RAF Little Sai Wan	367 and 368 Signals Units merged in 1946, and all personnel were at Little Sai Wan by 1953. Little Sai Wan was a signals intelligence station in the Siu Sai Wan area of Hong Kong. It was established by the RAF as base for 367 Signals Unit in the early 1950s. In 1964, following a review by Sir Gerald Templer, control of the site passed to Government Communications Headquarters.
No. 388 Signals Unit RAF	Unknown	Unknown	Unknown	Unknown	
No. 399 Signals Unit RAF	Unknown	Unknown	RAF Digby	1 September 1998	No. 399 Signals Unit arrived at RAF Digby in January 1955 and declared itself fully operational on 15 February, located in No. 2 hangar (now the station gymnasium). Active in 1983. On 1 September 1998 the Unit merged with the newly arrived Special Signals Support Unit from Loughborough to form the Joint Service Signal Unit (Digby).
No. 405 Signals Unit RAF	Unknown	Unknown	Unknown	Unknown	RAF Portreath 1995
No. 409 Signals Unit RAF	Unknown	Unknown	Unknown	Unknown	
No. 425 Signals Unit RAF	Unknown	Unknown	Unknown	Unknown	
No. 432 Signals Unit RAF	Unknown	Unknown	Unknown	Unknown	RAF Neatishead 1995
No. 444 Signals Unit RAF	16 August 1971	Stanley Fort	Hong Kong	31 December 1977	444 Signals Unit (SU) formed within 90 Group, Strike Command, with effect from 16 August 1971, and was established as a lodger unit at Stanley Fort, Hong Kong. The primary role of 444 SU was to act as a ground station for the Skynet (satellite) communications system. Disbanded and closed 31 December 1977.
No. 469 Signals Unit RAF	Unknown	Unknown	Unknown	Unknown	
No. 477 Signals Unit RAF	Unknown	RAF Butzweilerhof	Unknown	Unknown	Active at RAF Butzweilerhof, West Germany, for at least the period January 1956 - July 1958. Formed 31 January 1954 – 12 August 1958 from elements of HQ No. 5 (Signals) Wing RAF, absorbing most of No. 755 SU RAF Hambuhren 15 November 1957. No. 5 (Signals) Wing RAF was the commanding unit for HF/direction finding units in Germany from August 1958 to September 1966
No. 487 Signals Unit RAF	Unknown	Unknown	Unknown	Unknown	RAF Buchan 1995
No. 500 Signals Unit RAF	Unknown	Unknown	Unknown	Unknown	RAF Boulmer 1995
No. 585 Signals Unit RAF	Unknown	Unknown	Unknown	Unknown	
No. 588 Signals Unit RAF	November 1956	RAF Butzweilerhof	Unknown	Unknown	Security monitoring of VHF.
No. 591 Signals Unit RAF	Unknown	Unknown	Unknown	Unknown	Arrived at RAF Digby in July 1955 and set up in Hangar No. 1 (North).
No. 615 Signals Unit RAF	Unknown	Unknown	Unknown	Unknown	
No. 646 Signals Unit RAF	Unknown	Unknown	Unknown	Unknown	
No. 719 Signals Unit RAF	1 April 1953	RAF Habbaniya, Iraq	Unknown	Unknown	, see also Lee, Flight from the Middle East.
No. 721 Signals Unit RAF	Unknown	Unknown	Unknown	Unknown	
No. 724 Signals Unit RAF	Unknown	Unknown	Unknown	Unknown	
No. 751 Signals Unit RAF	Unknown	Mount Alice (Falkland Islands)	Unknown	Unknown	Located at Cape Greco, Cyprus, January 1956 - December 1959, as a mobile radar unit. Moved from RAF Ayios Nikolaos after March 1956.
No. 755 Signals Unit RAF	30 Jul 1955	RAF Hambuhren	Unknown	15 Nov 1957	Mostly absorbed by No. 477 SU RAF Butzweilerhof 15 November 1957.
No. 815 Signals Unit RAF	Unknown	Unknown	Unknown	Unknown	
No. 840 Signals Unit RAF	Unknown	RAF Siggiewi, Malta	Unknown	Unknown	RAF Siggiewi, Malta, 1976-70 RAF Lindholme 1994 (March 1994) seemingly closed 1996.
No. 889 Signals Unit RAF	Unknown	Unknown	Unknown	Unknown	
No. 926 Signals Unit RAF	Unknown	Unknown	Unknown	Unknown	
No. 953 Signals Unit RAF	Unknown	RAF Butzweilerhof	Unknown	Unknown	No. 5 (Signals) Wing RAF, RAF Second Tactical Air Force. Amalgamated with No. 330 SU and No. 259 SU as No. 330 SU May 1958-September 1961 in Ingolstadt as part of Gee (navigation) chain.
No. 962 Signals Unit RAF	Unknown	Unknown	Unknown	Unknown	
No. 966 Signals Unit RAF	Unknown	Unknown	Unknown	Unknown	
No. 993 Signals Unit RAF	Unknown	Unknown	Unknown	Unknown	
No. 1001 Signals Unit RAF	Unknown	Unknown	RAF Oakhanger	Unknown	Operating Skynet satellites for military communications.
Signals Development Unit RAF	15 April 1943 October 1946	Hinton-in-the-Hedges RAF West Drayton	Henlow	29 July 1944 1 January 1950	Equipped with Whitley, Wellington. Became Radio Engineering Unit RAF
Signals Flying Unit RAF	20 July 1944	Honiley	Honiley	1 September 1946	Equipped with Oxford and Vickers Wellington. Became part of Central Signals Establishment

=== Schools ===
Name	Formed	Location	Aircraft	Disbanded at	Disbanded	Unit became
1 Signals School	26 August 1940	Cranwell	Valentia; Wallace	Cranwell	1 January 1943	1 Radio School
2 Signals School	26 August 1940	Yatesbury	Dragon Rapide; Dominie	Yatesbury	1 January 1943	2 Radio School
3 Signals School	26 August 1940	Compton Bassett	N/A	Compton Bassett	1 January 1943	3 Radio School
3 Signals School (India)	19 August 1943	Hakimpet	Blenheim	Hakimpet	14 May 1944	Absorbed by 10 School of Air Force Technical Training, Hakimpet
4 Signals School	27 August 1941	Madley	Dominie; Proctor	Madley	1 January 1943	4 Radio School

== Calibration units and formations ==
Name	Formed	Location	Aircraft	Disbanded at	Disbanded	Unit became
No. 1 Calibration Flight RAF	6 November 1942	Speke	Blenheim IV; Hornet Moth	Speke	May 1943	Disbanded
No. 1 Calibration Flight, India RAF	Unknown	Unknown	Unknown	Dum-Dum	29 September 1942	No. 224 Group Calibration Flight RAF
No. 2 Calibration Flight, India RAF	Unknown	Unknown	Unknown	Ratmalana, Ceylon	29 September 1942	No. 222 Group Calibration Flight RAF
No. 3 Calibration Flight, India RAF	Unknown	Unknown	Unknown	Juhu	29 September 1942	No. 225 Group Calibration Flight RAF
No. 4 Calibration Flight, India RAF	Unknown	Unknown	Unknown	Jakkur	29 September 1942	No. 225 Group Calibration Flight RAF
No. 222 Group Calibration Flight RAF	29 September 1942	Ratmalana, Ceylon	Vengeance I	Ratmalana, Ceylon	July 1943	No. 1579 (Calibration) Flight RAF
No. 224 Group Calibration Flight RAF	29 September 1942	Dum-Dum	Sentinel I	Armada Road, India	15 March 1943	Bengal Calibration Flight RAF
No. 225 Group Calibration Flight RAF	29 September 1942	Juhu & Jakkur	Unknown	Jakkur	13 September 1943	No. 1580 (Calibration) Flight RAF
No. 1447 (Radar Calibration) Flight RAF	19 March 1942	Hooton Park	Battle; Lysander III	Carew Cheriton	15 December 1942	Absorbed by No. 4 Radio Direction Finding School RAF
No. 1448 (Radar Calibration) Flight RAF	17 February 1942	Duxford	Hornet Moth; Rota II	Halton	15 June 1943	No. 529 Squadron RAF
No. 1578 (Calibration) Flight RAF	25 September 1943	Blida, Algeria	Blenheim V Baltimore IIIA	Reghaia	15 June 1944	Mediterranean Allied Coastal Air Forces Communication Flight RAF
No. 1579 (Calibration) Flight RAF	July 1943	Ratmalana, Ceylon	Blenheim V Vengeance I	Ratmalana	10 October 1945	
No. 1580 (Calibration) Flight RAF	13 September 1943	Yelahanka, India	Blenheim V Vengeance I	Cholavaram, India	10 October 1945	
No. 1581 (Calibration) Flight RAF	25 August 1943	Alipore, India	Blenheim V Vengeance II	Dalbhumgarh, India	15 November 1945	
No. 1582 (Calibration) Flight RAF	25 August 1943	Kumbhirgram, India	Blenheim V Vengeance I	Dalbhumgarh, India	15 November 1945	
No. 1583 (Calibration) Flight RAF	28 August 1943	Chittagong, India	Blenheim V Vengeance I	Trichinopoly, India	15 November 1945	
No. 70 Wing Calibration Flight RAF	16 February 1941	Longman	Blenheim IV; Hornet Moth	Longman	15 June 1943	No. 526 Squadron RAF
No. 71 Wing Calibration Flight RAF	16 February 1941	Dyce	Blenheim IV; Hornet Moth	Dyce	15 June 1943	No. 526 Squadron RAF
No. 72 Wing Calibration Flight RAF	16 February 1941	Usworth	Blenheim IV; Hornet Moth	Usworth	15 June 1943	No. 526 Squadron RAF
No. 73 Wing Calibration Flight RAF	16 February 1941	Church Fenton	Blenheim IV; Hornet Moth	Unknown	30 October 1942	No. 77 Wing Calibration Flight
No. 74 Wing Calibration Flight RAF	16 February 1941	Duxford	Blenheim IV; Hornet Moth	Duxford	15 June 1943	No. 527 Squadron RAF
No. 75 Wing Calibration Flight RAF	16 February 1941	Biggin Hill	Blenheim IV; Hornet Moth	Biggin Hill	15 June 1943	No. 527 Squadron RAF
No. 76 Wing Calibration Flight RAF	16 February 1941	Filton	Blenheim IV; Hornet Moth	Filton	15 June 1943	Disbanded
No. 77 Wing Calibration Flight RAF	16 February 1941	Speke	Blenheim IV; Hornet Moth	Speke	6 November 1942	No. 1 Calibration Flight RAF
No. 78 Wing Calibration Flight RAF	25 May 1941	Filton	Blenheim IV; Hornet Moth	Harrowbeer	15 June 1943	No. 528 Squadron RAF
No. 79 Wing Calibration Flight RAF	October 1941	Long Kesh	Blenheim IV; Hornet Moth	Speke	30 October 1942	No. 77 Wing Calibration Flight RAF
No. 110 Wing Calibration Flight RAF	1 March 1940	Ringway	Battle; Leopard Moth	Filton	5 May 1941	Disbanded
Bangalore Calibration Flight RAF	October 1942	Bangalore, India	Nil	Yelahanka, India	13 September 1943	No. 1580 (Calibration) Flight RAF
Bengal Calibration Flight RAF	15 March 1943	Amarda Road, India	Blenheim V Vengeance I	Alipore, India	25 August 1943	No. 1583 (Calibration) Flight RAF
Calibration Flight RAF, Seletar	30 June 1941	Seletar, Malaya	Vildebeest	Seletar	February 1942	Destroyed
RDF Calibration Flight RAF, Sebala II	June 1942	Sebala II, Tunisia		Sebala II	7 August 1943	RDF Calibration Flight RAF, Blida
RDF Calibration Flight RAF, Blida	7 August 1943	Blida, Algeria	Blenheim V; Beaufighter II	Blida	25 September 1943	No. 1578 (Calibration) Flight RAF
No. 1 Anti-Aircraft Calibration Flight RAF	27 December 1940	Gatwick	Wallace II; Lysander I	Hatfield	17 February 1941	No. 116 Squadron RAF
