= Leslie Dalton-Morris =

Royal Air Force Air Marshal (1906-1976)

Sir Leslie Dalton-Morris
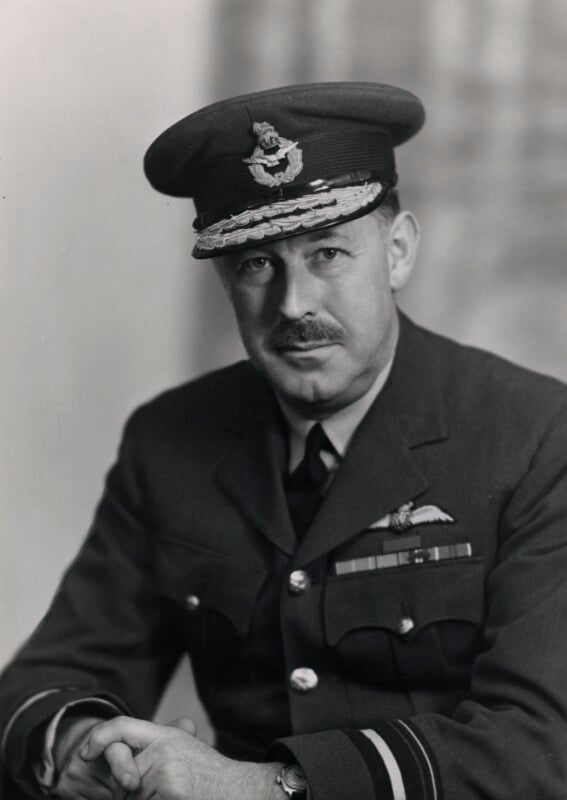
- Dalton-Morris in 1953
- Born: 7 April 1906
- Died: 28 October 1976 (aged 70)
- Military career
- Allegiance: United Kingdom
- Branch: Royal Air Force
- Service years: 1924–63
- Rank: Air Marshal
- Commands: Maintenance Command (1961–63); Signals Command (1958–61); No. 90 (Signals) Group (1956–58); Central Signals Establishment (1948–50)
- Conflicts: Second World War
- Awards: Knight Commander of the Order of the British Empire; Companion of the Order of the Bath; Mentioned in Despatches

Air Marshal Sir Leslie Dalton-Morris, KBE, CB (7 April 1906 – 28 October 1976) was a senior Royal Air Force (RAF) commander in the middle of the twentieth century. He played a leading role in the use of signals in the Air Force both during and after the Second World War.

== Early years ==
After joining the RAF as a trainee pilot in 1924, Dalton-Morris underwent instruction at No. 5 Flying Training School at Sealand near Chester. He served a period as a night flying pilot, then was posted to No. 15 Squadron, before being selected to attend the RAF Electrical and Wireless School in 1929. Graduating from his course as a flight lieutenant with a permanent commission, Dalton-Morris served as the signals officer with No. 203 Squadron in the early 1930s. After a tour of duty at the Marine Aircraft Experimental Establishment at RAF Felixstowe, Dalton-Morris returned to the Electrical and Wireless School as an instructor in 1935.

In 1935 Dalton-Morris attended the RAF Staff College at Andover, Hampshire, received a promotion to squadron leader and in 1938 he was sent to No. 2 Group as a staff officer.

== Second World War ==
The same year as the Second World War started, Dalton-Morris was appointed the Deputy Chief Signals Officer at the headquarters of Fighter Command at RAF Bentley Priory. By January 1941 Dalton-Morris had been promoted to wing commander when he returned to No. 2 Group as a signals officer. The next year he was moved to Bomber Command, which was No. 2 Group's higher formation. He served as the Deputy Chief Signals Officer at Bomber Command's headquarters at RAF High Wycombe.

In 1943 Dalton-Morris was promoted to acting air commodore and took up new duties as the Senior Air Staff Officer at No. 26 (Signals) Group, which controlled British Radar stations. In early 1944 Dalton-Morris returned to Bomber Command where he served as the Chief Signals Officer.

== Post-war ==
After the war Dalton-Morris held a number of senior signals appointments in the RAF, serving as the Director of Radio/Signals, the Commandant of the Central Signals Establishment from 1948 and the Chief Signals Officer at the headquarters of the Middle East Air Force from 1950.

In March 1952, Dalton-Morris was promoted to acting air vice marshal and made Assistant Chief of the Air Staff (Signals). He went on to higher command as Air Officer Commanding No 90 (Signals) Group in 1956 and Air Officer Commanding-in-Chief Signals Command in 1958. In 1961 Dalton-Morris was promoted to air marshal and, having exhausted senior RAF signals appointments, he became Air Officer Commanding-in-Chief Maintenance Command. He retired from that post and the RAF just over two years later in July 1963.

Military offices
| Preceded by John Weston | Air Officer Commanding No. 90 (Signals) Group; 1956–1958 | Group upgraded to Command status |
| Command created from No. 90 (Signals) Group | Air Officer Commanding-in-Chief Signals Command; 1958–1961 | Succeeded by Alick Foord-Kelcey |
| Preceded by Sir Douglas Jackman | Air Officer Commanding-in-Chief Maintenance Command; 1961–1963 | Succeeded by Sir Norman Coslett |
