= Raymund Hart =

RAF Air Marshal (1899-1960)

Sir Raymund Hart
- Born: 28 February 1899; Merton, Surrey, England
- Died: 16 July 1960 (aged 61)
- Military career
- Allegiance: United Kingdom
- Branch: British Army (1917–18); Royal Air Force (1918–59)
- Service years: 1917–1959
- Rank: Air Marshal
- Commands: No. 45 Group (1955–56); No. 90 (Signals) Group (1949–51); No. 27 (Training) Group (1946–47)
- Conflicts: First World War; Second World War
- Awards: Knight Commander of the Order of the British Empire; Companion of the Order of the Bath; Military Cross; Mentioned in Despatches (3)

Air Marshal Sir Raymund George Hart, KBE, CB, MC (28 February 1899 – 16 July 1960) was a senior commander in the Royal Air Force (RAF) during the Second World War and the post-war decade. Throughout this period, he was a specialist in military signals and a pioneer in the development of Radar. During the latter part of the First World War, Hart was a pilot in the Royal Flying Corps and RAF. Between the wars, Hart was a junior and middle-ranking officer in the RAF.

== Early life ==
Hart was born in Merton, Surrey on 28 February 1899 and was educated at the Simon Langton School.

== First World War ==
Hart joined the Royal Flying Corps in 1917 and was posted to the Western Front with 15 Squadron. On 11 April 1918 he was flying a Royal Aircraft Factory R.E.8 two-seat biplane on an artillery observation patrol. Over Bouzincourt he was attacked by four German fighters, the elevator controls were damaged by gun fire and Hart attempted to recover the aircraft. His observer Second Lieutenant L.F. Handford managed to shoot three of the fighters down. The R.E.8 crashed and Hart and Handford were wounded. Both men were later awarded the Military Cross for the action.

== Royal Air Force ==
Hart rejoined the Royal Air Force in 1926 and from 1936 he worked at RAF Bawdsey on the first experimental radar station. In 1941 he moved to the Air Ministry as deputy director of Radar before moving to Fighter Command as the Command Signals Officer. In 1944 Hart became Chief Air Signals Officer at Supreme Headquarters Allied Expeditionary Force whener he was involved in the planning for the D-Day landings.

After the war he became Air Officer Commanding of No. 90 Group and from 1951 in the Air Ministry as Director General of Engineering and later Controller of Engineering and Equipment before he retired in 1959.

== Family life ==
Hart was married and had one son. Hart died on 16 July 1960 at his home at Aston Rowant in Oxfordshire, he was electrocuted while connecting power to an electric lawn mower, he was aged 61.

Military offices
Preceded by Edward Addison	Air Officer Commanding No. 90 (Signals) Group; 1949–1951	Succeeded by William Theak
