= William Theak =

Royal Air Force Air Vice-Marshal (1898-1955)

- Born: 1898; Clapton, London, England
- Died: 28 January 1955 (aged 56–57); Suffolk, England
- Military career
- Allegiance: United Kingdom
- Branch: British Army (1917–18); Royal Air Force (1918–54)
- Service years: 1917–1954
- Rank: Air vice-marshal
- Service number: 765252
- Commands: No. 90 (Signals) Group (1951–54); No. 60 (Signals) Group (1944–45); No. 7 Squadron (1938–39)
- Conflicts: First World War; Second World War
- Awards: Companion of the Order of the Bath; Commander of the Order of the British Empire; Mentioned in dispatches (2)

Air Vice-Marshal William Edward Theak, CB, CBE (1898 – 28 January 1955) was a First World War pilot in the Royal Flying Corps and a senior officer in the Royal Air Force during the Second World War and the post war decade.

In 1940, Theak was appointed as the chief signals officer at the headquarters of Bomber Command. In February 1944, he was promoted to air vice-marshal and given command of No. 60 (Signals) Group.

After the war Theak was made the director-general of signals at the Air Ministry. In 1949 he took up post as the air officer administration at the headquarters of the Middle East Air Force. In 1951 he returned to Great Britain to serve as Air Officer Commanding No. 90 (Signals) Group. He retired in March 1954 and died the following year.

Military offices
Preceded by Victor Hubert Tait	Director-General of Signals; 1945–1949	Succeeded by Edward Addison
Preceded by Raymund Hart	Air Officer Commanding No. 90 (Signals) Group; 1951–1954	Succeeded by John Weston
