= Edward Addison =

Royal Air Force officer (1898–1987)

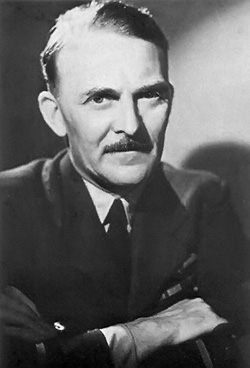
- Born: 4 October 1898; Cambridge, England
- Died: 4 July 1987 (aged 88); Weybridge, Surrey, England
- Military career
- Allegiance: United Kingdom
- Service: Royal Air Force
- Years: 1918–1955
- Rank: Air Vice Marshal
- Commands: No. 80 Wing (1940–1943); No. 90 Group (1946–1949); No. 100 Group (1943–1945)
- Conflicts: World War I; World War II
- Awards: Companion of the Order of the Bath; Commander of the Order of the British Empire; Mentioned in Despatches; Legion of Merit (United States)

Air Vice Marshal Edward Barker Addison, CB, CBE, FIEE (4 October 1898 – 4 July 1987) was a senior British Royal Air Force (RAF) officer who served as Air Officer Commanding No. 100 Group from 1943 to 1945 during the Second World War. The group jammed Axis radar and communications systems from the air and Addison was its only commander.

== Early career ==
Addison was born on 4 October 1898 and served with the Royal Flying Corps and the RAF during the First World War.

After the war he studied at Sidney Sussex College in Cambridge and then re-entered the RAF in 1921. His studies continued, gaining his master's degree from Cambridge in 1926 and the Engineer's degree from the École Supérieure d'Électricité of Paris in 1927.

== Battle of the Beams ==
As a result of British scientific intelligence's discovery of the Knickebein beam system being used by the Luftwaffe during June 1940, No. 80 Wing RAF was established at RAF Radlett to operate countermeasures. Addison, now a wing commander, had recently returned from the Middle East and was appointed to command the new unit. The technical design of countermeasures was handled by a section under Dr Robert Cockburn at the Telecommunications Research Establishment at Swanage. Both organisations were given the highest priority during the Luftwaffe 's night-bombing Blitz against British cities. 80 Wing worked under the immediate control of the Air Ministry but kept in close touch with the Fighter Command operations room at RAF Bentley Priory.

The first jammers developed at Swanage were simple diathermy sets to transmit a 'mush' of noise on the Knickebein frequency. These were quickly replaced by higher powered equipment called 'Aspirins' (to counteract the Knickebein beams, which were codenamed 'Headaches'). Knickebein was soon superseded by X-Gerät and Y-Gerät directional beams, which in turn were eventually jammed by 80 Wing in the Battle of the Beams.

In early November intelligence pointed to a major operation being planned by the Luftwaffe against the Midlands (Coventry Blitz Operation Moonlight Sonata/Unternehmen Mondscheinsonate). The operation orders to the X-Gerät stations on 14 November were intercepted but could not be deciphered by Bletchley Park in time, although 80 Wing's aircraft detected the X-Gerät radio frequencies. Addison telephoned the Air Staff's scientific intelligence adviser, Dr R.V. Jones and they guessed the frequencies to jam but the jamming had no effect. Coventry was bombed that night (the Coventry Blitz) with 554 killed and 865 seriously injured. Addison and Jones investigated the failure and the Royal Aircraft Establishment discovered from the X-Gerät equipment in a shot down aircraft that it contained a filter set to 2,000 Hz, whereas the jammers were set to 1,500 Hz. Thereafter X-Gerät was jammed by 80 Wing and the accuracy of German bombing declined until the Blitz ended in May 1941.

On 23–24 April 1942, the Luftwaffe began a new campaign against the UK (the Baedeker Blitz ) with a sharp raid on Exeter, followed by a series of raids on other provincial cities. Scientific intelligence gave about six weeks' warning that these raids would employ X-Gerät with a new supersonic modulation frequency. 80 Wing was able to add supersonic modulation to its jammers but was briefed not to employ this countermeasure until listening stations had confirmed that the Luftwaffe was using the new technique. The designers of the listening receivers had overlooked the fact that supersonic reception involves a wider bandwidth than normal in the high frequency circuits of the receivers. Once this was corrected, 80 Wing was able to jam the beam and reduce the 50 per cent success rate (bombs on target) of the early Baedeker raids to 13 per cent and the campaign petered out. R.V. Jones estimated that the delay in allowing 80 Wing to begin jamming cost about 400 lives and another 600 serious injuries, while Anti-Aircraft Command was forced to redeploy hundreds of guns to cover potential Baedeker targets.

No. 80 Wing was later incorporated in 100 (Bomber Support) Group, which was formed at Radlett in November 1943 under Addison (by now promoted to air commodore and later to air vice-marshal) to operate radio-countermeasures as part of RAF Bomber Command. By the end of the war 100 (BS) Group was based at Bylaugh Hall in Norfolk with 13 operational squadrons flying a variety of aircraft equipped for radio countermeasures and De Havilland Mosquito intruders directly to attack Luftwaffe night fighters.

== Later career ==
Addison retired from the RAF in 1955 to a civilian career, maintaining a close involvement with the electronics field until his retirement as Director of Intercontinental Technical Services in 1975.

In 1977 Addison appeared in the BBC television documentary series The Secret War, in episode one; "The Battle of the Beams".

Addison died at Weybridge, Surrey, on 4 July 1987, aged 88.

== External sources ==
- Air of Authority – A History of RAF Organisation – Air Vice Marshal E B Addison
- Royal Air Force – Bomber Command Commanders of World War II

Military offices
New title Group created	Air Officer Commanding No. 90 (Signals) Group; 1946–1949	Succeeded by Raymund Hart
Preceded by William Theak	Director-General of Signals; 1949–1952	Unknown
