= John Weston (RAF officer) =

Sir John Weston
- Born: 15 November 1908
- Died: 13 June 1979 (aged 70)
- Military career
- Allegiance: United Kingdom
- Branch: Royal Air Force
- Service years: 1927–1964
- Rank: Air Vice Marshal
- Commands: No. 90 (Signals) Group (1954–56); RAF Halton (1952–53); No. 1 School of Technical Training RAF (1952–53); Central Signals Establishment (1946–48)
- Conflicts: Second World War
- Awards: Knight Commander of the Order of the British Empire; Companion of the Order of the Bath

Air Vice Marshal Sir John Gerard Willsley Weston, KBE, CB (15 November 1908 – 13 June 1979) was a high-ranking signals officer in the Royal Air Force during the Second World War and the post-war years. He later served as the Deputy Head of the Secret Intelligence Service (MI6). There is a Weston Avenue in Leighton Buzzard that used to be housing for personnel at RAF Stanbridge. Since this was a signals establishment during the Second World War, it is believed that it is named after him.

Military offices
Preceded by William Theak	Air Officer Commanding No. 90 (Signals) Group; 1954–1956	Succeeded by Leslie Dalton-Morris
