= Benjamin Ball =

Benjamin Ball may refer to:

- Benjamin Ball (physician) (1833–1893), English-born French psychiatrist
- Sir Benjamin Ball (RAF officer) (1912–1977), English Royal Air Force officer
