= Benjamin Ball (RAF officer) =

Royal Air Force Air Vice-Marshal (1912-1977)

Sir Benjamin Ball
- Ball in 1969
- Born: 6 September 1912
- Died: 24 January 1977 (aged 64)
- Military career
- Allegiance: United Kingdom
- Branch: Royal Air Force
- Service years: 1934–69
- Rank: Air Vice Marshal
- Commands: Signals Command (1966–69); RAF Debden (1951–53)
- Conflicts: Second World War
- Awards: Knight Commander of the Order of the British Empire; Companion of the Order of the Bath; Mentioned in Despatches

Air Vice Marshal Sir Benjamin Ball, KBE, CB (6 September 1912 – 24 January 1977) was a Royal Air Force officer who served as Air Officer Commanding-in-Chief Signals Command from 1966 until its disbandment in 1969.

== RAF career ==
Ball joined the Royal Air Force as a cadet in 1934. He served in the Second World War as a signals officer at RAF Bircham Newton and then at Headquarters RAF Reserve Command, as Chief Signals Officer in the Training Commands of the Royal Canadian Air Force and as Group Captain, Operations with No. 26 Group. After the War he became Chief Signals Officer at Headquarters Bomber Command and then became Director of Signals in the British Joint Services Mission to Washington D. C. He went on to be Station Commander at RAF Debden in 1951, Deputy Director of Operational Requirements at the Air Ministry in 1953 and Chief Signals Officer at Headquarters Bomber Command in 1957. His last appointments were as Deputy Chief Signals Officer at Supreme Headquarters Allied Powers Europe in 1960, as Senior Air Staff Officer at Headquarters Technical Training Command in 1963 and Air Officer Commanding-in-Chief at Signals Command in 1966 before retiring in 1969.

He was appointed a Knight Commander of the Order of the British Empire in the New Year Honours List in 1969.

Military offices
Preceded by Sir Thomas Shirley	Air Officer Commanding-in-Chief Signals Command; 1966–1969	Command disbanded
