= Thomas Shirley (RAF officer) =

Royal Air Force Air Vice-Marshal (1908-1982)

Sir Thomas Shirley
- Born: 4 June 1908
- Died: 16 January 1982 (aged 73)
- Military career
- Allegiance: United Kingdom
- Branch: Royal Air Force
- Service years: 1928–66
- Rank: Air Vice Marshal
- Commands: Signals Command (1964–66); RAF Technical College (1957–59)
- Conflicts: Second World War; Cold War
- Awards: Knight Commander of the Order of the British Empire; Companion of the Order of the Bath; Mentioned in Despatches

Air Vice Marshal Sir Thomas Ulric Curzon Shirley, KBE, CB, CEng, FRAeS, FIEE (4 June 1908 – 16 January 1982) was a Royal Air Force officer who served as Air Officer Commanding-in-Chief Signals Command from 1964 until 1966. In that role he had command of aircraft flying over Eastern Europe monitoring Warsaw Pact signal traffic at the height of the Cold War.

== RAF career ==
Shirley became a Royal Air Force cadet at RAF Cranwell in 1928, and was commissioned as a pilot in 1930. He was promoted to flying officer on 26 January 1932 and to flight lieutenant on 26 January 1936.

Shirley served with the Army Cooperation Squadrons until 1936, when he became a Technical Specialist Officer in Signals Communications. He served the Second World War as a Signals Officer at Headquarters RAF Middle East and then as a Staff Officer in the Directorate of Telecommunications at the Air Ministry. He was appointed a Commander of the Order of the British Empire for his service at the ministry during the war in the 1946 New Year Honours.

After the war he became deputy director of Signals at the Air Ministry and then Chief Signals Officer at Headquarters Transport Command before becoming Director of Radio Engineering at the Air Ministry in 1950. After that he became command signals officer at RAF Fighter Command, Air Officer Commanding the RAF Technical College at Henlow in Bedfordshire in January 1957, and Senior Technical Staff Officer at Headquarters Fighter Command in 1959.

Shirley became Air Officer Commanding-in-Chief at Signals Command in 1964. In that role, he had command of the all squadrons operating de Havilland Comet R2 ELINT aircraft flying over Eastern Europe monitoring Warsaw Pact signal traffic.

Shirley retired in 1966 and was appointed a Knight Commander of the Order of the British Empire in the 1966 New Year Honours.

Shirley served as aide-de-camp to King George VI from 1950 to 1952 and then to Queen Elizabeth II from 1952 to 1953.

== Personal life ==
He married Vera Overton. His portrait can be seen in the National Portrait Gallery.

Military offices
Preceded by Sir Walter Pretty	Air Officer Commanding-in-Chief Signals Command; 1964–1966	Succeeded by Sir Benjamin Ball
