= RAF Bampton Castle =

Former RAF communications station

RAF Bampton Castle
- Bampton, Oxfordshire in England
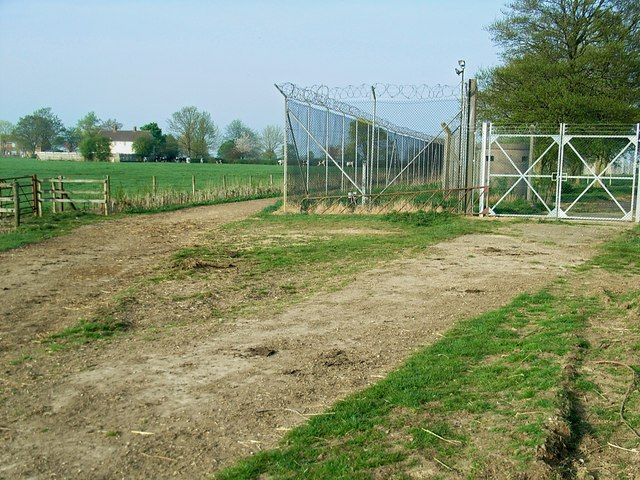
- RAF Bampton Castle looking north eastwards across the edge of the base

Site information
- Type: Royal Air Force station
- Owner: Ministry of Defence
- Operator: British Army; Royal Air Force

Location
- Shown within Oxfordshire
- Coordinates: 51°42′47.9″N 001°32′55″W

Site history
- Built: 1939
- In use: 1939 - 2006
- Battles/wars: Second World War; Cold War

Royal Air Force Bampton Castle or RAF Bampton Castle is a former non-flying Royal Air Force station near Bampton Castle, Oxfordshire, England.

The base was established by the Royal Corps of Signals in 1939 and handed over to the RAF in 1969. It was the home of No. 2 and No. 81 Signal Units, which dealt with high frequency radio communications. Day-to-day operations were overseen (parented in RAF speak) by RAF Brize Norton due to the larger base's proximity to Bampton Castle and that Brize was the home of No. 38 Group Tactical Communications Wing RAF (and successors until 2006).

The station closed progressively between 2003 and 2006 when the RAF's high frequency communications system was replaced by the Defence High Frequency Communications Service. Approximately seventy-two masts were removed in December 2003 and the final two removed in 2015. The site is now in use as a business centre.
