= Douglas Jackman =

Royal Air Force Air Marshal (1902–1991)

Sir Douglas Jackman
- Born: 26 October 1902
- Died: 15 June 1991 (aged 88)
- Military career
- Allegiance: United Kingdom
- Branch: Royal Air Force
- Service years: 1926–61
- Rank: Air Marshal
- Commands: Maintenance Command (1958–61); No. 40 (Maintenance) Group (1952–55)
- Conflicts: Second World War
- Awards: Knight Commander of the Order of the British Empire; Companion of the Order of the Bath; Mentioned in Despatches (3); Commander of the Royal Order of George I (Greece); Air Force Cross (Greece)

Air Marshal Sir Harold Douglas Jackman, KBE, CB (26 October 1902 – 15 June 1991) was a senior Royal Air Force officer who served as Air Officer Commanding-in-Chief Maintenance Command from 1958 until his retirement in 1961.

== RAF career ==
Jackman joined the Royal Air Force in 1926 initially serving as a Stores Officer. He served in the Second World War as an Administrative Staff Officer at Headquarters RAF Middle East, then as Air Officer Administration at Headquarters Mediterranean Air Command before becoming Assistant Air Officer Administration at Headquarters Mediterranean Allied Air Forces and then Air Officer Administration at Headquarters Balkan Air Force.

After the war he was appointed Director of Movements and then Director of Organisation (Forecasting and Planning) at the Air Ministry. He went on to be Air Officer Commanding No. 40 (Maintenance) Group in 1952, Director-General of Equipment at the Air Ministry in 1955 and Air Officer Commanding Maintenance Command in 1958, where he laid the foundation stone for a new Headquarters at Andover before retiring in 1961.

In retirement he became Chief Co-ordinator of the Anglo-American Community Relations Scheme in the UK.

Military offices
| Preceded by Sir Richard Jordan | Air Officer Commanding-in-Chief Maintenance Command; 1958–1961 | Succeeded by Sir Leslie Dalton-Morris |
