= RAF Inverness =

Defunct civil and military airfield in Scotland

RAF Longman RAF Inverness
- Inverness, Highland in Scotland

Site information
- Type: Royal Air Force station
- Owner: Air Ministry
- Operator: Royal Air Force
- Controlled by: RAF Fighter Command
- Condition: Demolished, now Industrial Estate

Location
- Shown within Scotland Highlands RAF Inverness (the United Kingdom)
- Coordinates: 57°29′20″N 4°13′07″W

Site history
- Built: 1940
- In use: 1940-1945
- Battles/wars: European theatre of World War II

Garrison information
- Garrison: No. 13 (Fighter) Group

Royal Air Force Inverness or more simply RAF Inverness is a former Royal Air Force station located by the Moray Firth in Highland, Scotland. It was also known as RAF Longman and previously Longman Airfield.

== History ==
Longman Airfield was built in 1933 by the local council as a civilian airport for Highland Airways to link Orkney and Wick to Inverness and its major rail links. The airfield was converted to a Royal Air Force base at the Outbreak of World War II, but didn't officially become an RAF base until 1941. The airfield was identified by German reconnaissance units which incorrectly noted it as a seaplane base, which probably saved Inverness from any major bombing by the Luftwaffe.

During the war, Scottish Airways, the successor to Highland Airways, continued to use the airfield for intensive civilian operations supporting the Orkney and Shetland Isles.

Under the command of No. 13 (Fighter) Group, it hosted No. 70 (Signals) Wing Calibration Flight between 17 February 1941 and 25 August 1945.

=== Operational Squadrons & Aircraft ===
Unit	From	To	Aircraft	Version	Notes
No. 241 Squadron RAF	Sep 1940	Apr 1942	Westland Lysander	MK. II	Formed from 'A' Flight of 614 Squadron.
No. 289 Squadron RAF	1 May 1939	Sep 1939	Avro Anson	?	
No. 309 Polish Fighter-Reconnaissance Squadron			Supermarine Spitfire	Mk. I	
No. 526 Squadron RAF	June 1943	1 May 1945	Airspeed Oxford	MK. I	Absorbed into 527 Squadron
No. 527 Squadron RAF	1 May 1945	8 Nov 1945	de Havilland Dominie		
No. 598 Squadron RAF	1 Dec 1943	12 Mar 1945	Airspeed Oxford	Mk. II	
No. 614 Squadron RAF 'A' flight	8 Jun 1940	5 Mar 1941	Westland Lysander	Mk. II	Became 241 Squadron
782 Naval Air Squadron					

=== Other units ===
- No. 14 Group Target Towing Flight RAF (October – November 1941) became No. 1491 (Target Towing) Flight RAF (December 1941)
- No. 1 (Coastal) Engine Control Demonstration Unit RAF (October – November 1943)
- No. 1 Radio Servicing Section Calibration Flight RAF (November 1940 – February 1941) became No. 70 Wing Calibration Flight RAF (February 1941 – June 1943)
- No. 13 Group Communication Flight RAF (July 1943 – December 1945)
- No. 14 Group Communication Flight RAF (July 1940 – July 1943)
- Detachment of No. 1479 (Anti-Aircraft Cooperation) Flight RAF (August & November 1943)

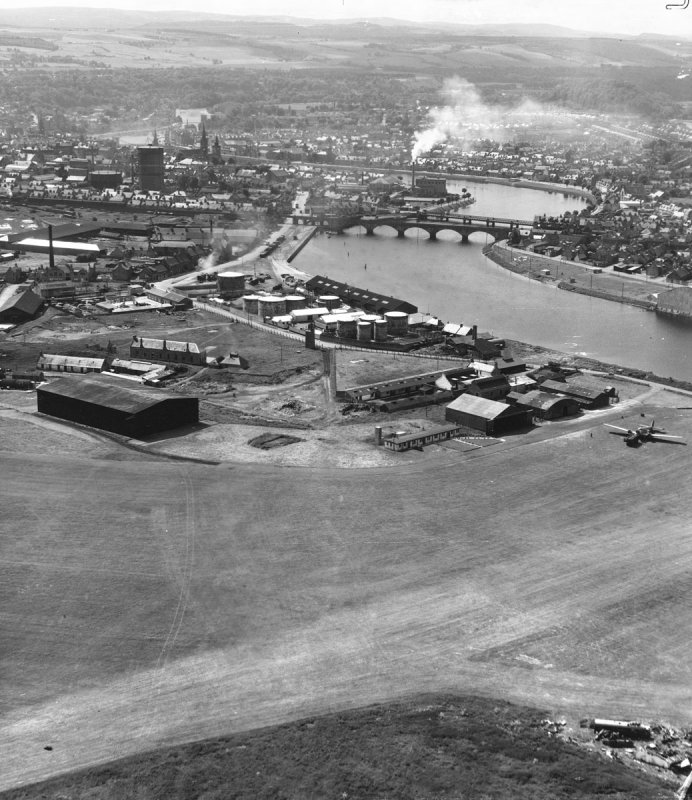
Longman Aerodrome c.1947, Junkers Ju 52 in mid right

Following the war it was converted to general use under the title Longman Airfield until Inverness Airport at Dalcross became the primary hub in 1947, due to Longman being regarded as too small for safe operations. Prior to its closure, it was served by British European Airways, and its fleet of captured ex-Luftwaffe Junkers Ju 52. It is believed that for some time Hitler's personal Ju 52 (registration D-2600) was stored at Longman after the war.
