= Cologne Butzweilerhof Airport =

Former airport of Cologne, West Germany (1912–1995)

Cologne Butzweilerhof Airport Flughafen Köln-Butzweilerhof
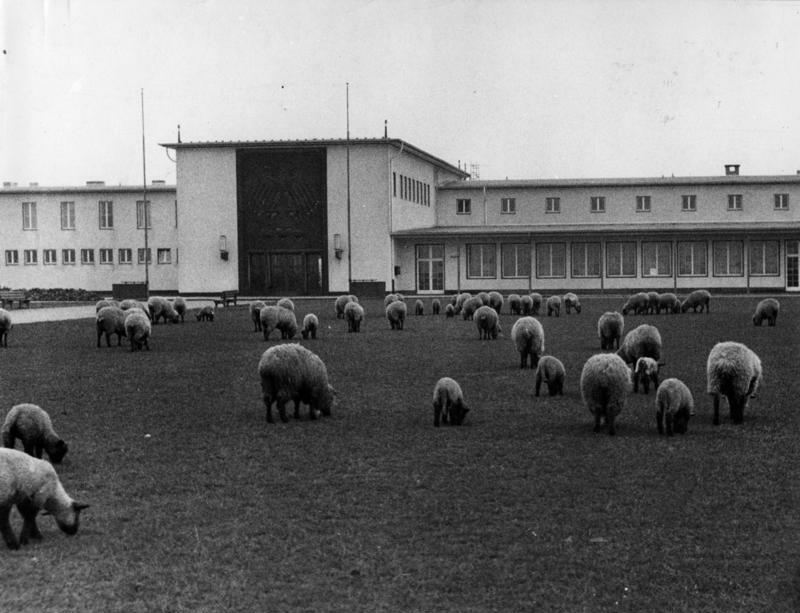
- Main entrance, 1937
- IATA: CGN; ICAO: EDCU, ETBB

Summary
- Airport type: Defunct
- Operator: various
- Location: Cologne, West Germany
- Opened: 13 May 1926
- Closed: 31 December 1995
- Passenger services ceased: 1980
- Hub for: Deutsche Luft Hansa
- Built: 1912
- Elevation AMSL: 158 ft (48 m)
- Coordinates: 50°59′05.3″N 6°53′29.1″E
- Interactive map of Cologne Butzweilerhof Airport

Runways
Direction	Length		Surface
Direction	m	ft	Surface
04/22	728	2,390	asphalt
- Sources: DoD FLIP

Butzweilerhof was an airport in Cologne in West Germany. It was established as a training airfield in 1912, and saw airline service from 1922 until the 1950s. It was replaced by the Cologne Bonn Airport. The airport buildings from 1935 to 1936 are registered as listed monuments, and a rare example of airport architecture from the interwar period. From 1951 to 1967, it was operated by the Royal Air Force as RAF Butzweilerhof.

== History ==
Before regular aviation activities at Butzweilerhof started, the area north of Cologne was sporadically used by airships. The military Zeppelin Z II arrived in Cologne in August 1909, and was based in a nearby hangar until it was destroyed in a storm in April 1910. In addition, a blimp designed and manufactured in 1909 by Clouth Gummiwerke from nearby suburb Nippes was temporarily stored at this hangar.

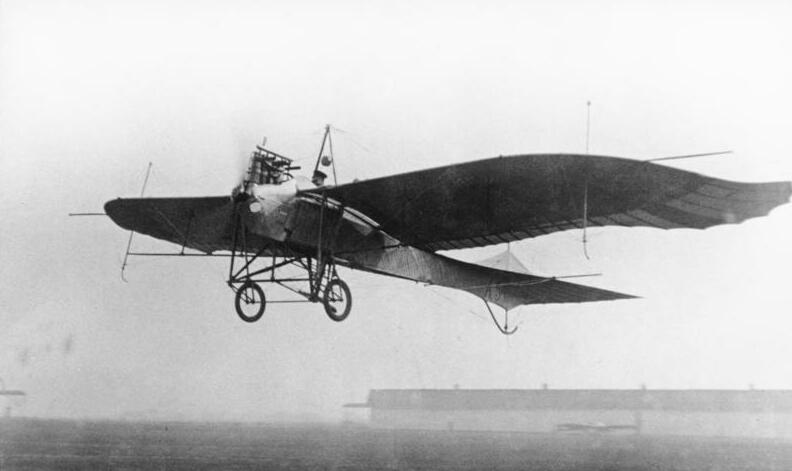
Rumpler Taube taking off from Butzweilerhof in 1913/14

=== Beginnings and World War I ===
In 1912, the Air Arm of the Imperial Army (Luftstreitkräfte) established an air station at Butzweilerhof; and hangars, maintenance facilities, as well as staff accommodation were built. The station became fully operational in spring 1913, and was used for initial pilot training before and during World War I. Among the pilots receiving their first flying lessons at Butzweilerhof was Manfred von Richthofen (later to be known as the 'Red Baron').

=== Interwar period ===
After the war, the Royal Air Force (RAF) used the airfield primarily in a supply role for British troops, and included an airmail service. From 1922, Instone Air Line provided the first regular passenger service to London via Brussels. The airfield was returned to the city of Cologne in 1925, and the civil airport was officially opened one year later. In order to fulfil requirements of modern aircraft, adjacent property was bought. The enlarged airfield had a circular shape and occupied around 30 hectares (74 acres). The then mayor of Cologne Konrad Adenauer supported the development of Butzweilerhof into a modern airport, but due to limited financial resources, only small progress was made during the late 1920s and early 1930s. Some facilities in use still originated from the imperial air station, while newer ones were basic and partially made of wood.

After 1933, the expansion plans were adopted by the new national-socialist government of Cologne, and a major expansion project started in 1935. It served as a job creating programme for around 1,100 unemployed. In the course of this project, a new airport complex consisting of a passenger building, workshops, two hangars, and a control tower was erected. The new facilities were opened after only one year of construction time in June 1936, a few weeks prior to the Olympic Games in Berlin.

Largest operator pre-war was Deutsche Luft Hansa. Foreign operators such as Imperial Airways, Air France, and Sabena accounted for approximately one out of four movements. For some time, Butzweilerhof was second in Germany only to Berlin Tempelhof, and dubbed Luftkreuz des Westens (Air junction of the West). Traffic figures reached a peak in 1938 with 6,390 aircraft departures as well as 49,938 arriving and departing passengers.

=== World War II and Cold War ===
During World War II, Butzweilerhof was predominately used for emergency landings and as field repair station for fighter aircraft. The Royal Air Force moved in again after the war and the airfield became RAF Butzweilerhof. Some airline service was restarted, but ceased with the opening of Cologne Bonn Airport.

The RAF base closed in the 1960s, and some airport facilities were subsequently used by non-flying units of the German Army. The airfield stayed in use until 1996 by army aviation units of the Belgian Armed Forces from nearby barracks.

== Airport buildings ==
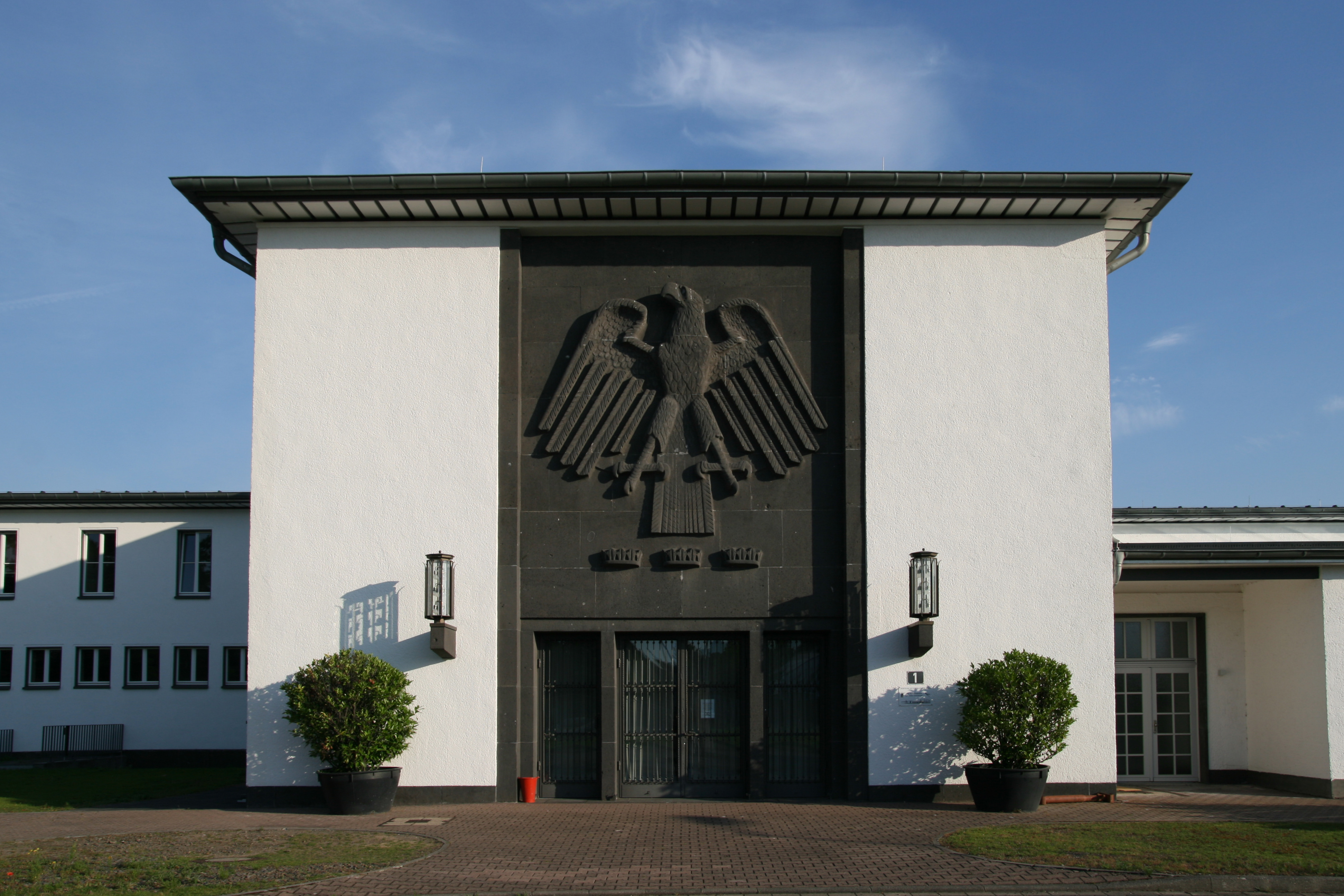
Landside portal from 1936 with relief

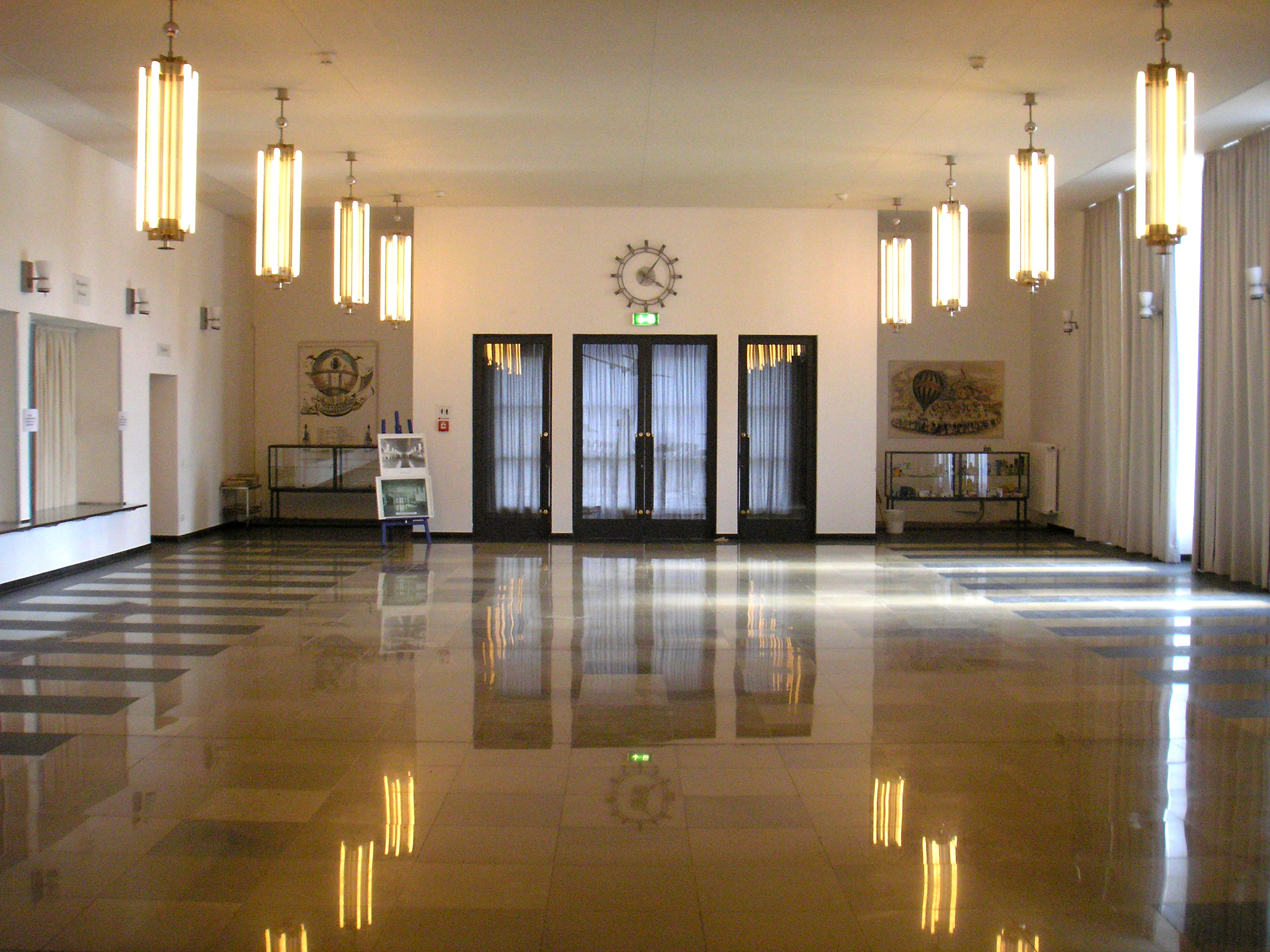
Passenger Hall

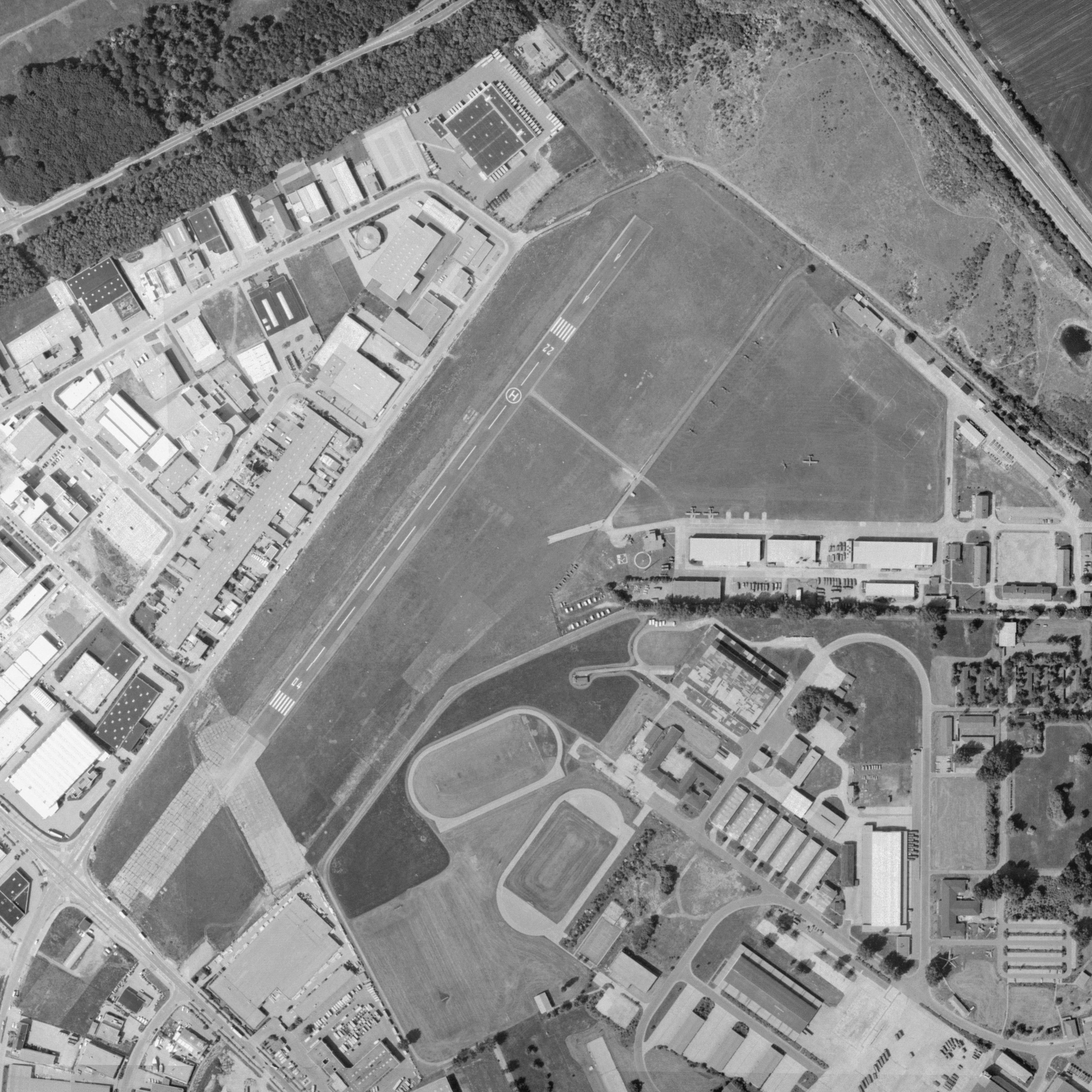
Aerial view

The airport buildings from 1935 to 1936 were designed by Hans Mehrtens, Chief Building Director of Cologne since 1930. An airport road was built in straight line to the city centre, and the airport facilities were positioned directly at its end. The group of buildings is approximately 270 metres (890 feet) long and arranged slightly curved to follow the perimeter of the circular airfield.

=== Passenger building ===
The passenger building is a two-storey flat roof construction parallel to the airfield perimeter. The passenger traverses the building through the lobby which is aligned with the former airport road, and divides the building into a western and eastern wing. Arriving passengers were looking directly at the distant Cologne Cathedral when leaving the building to the landside.

The landside portal of the lobby is decorated with a relief made by the sculptor Willi Meller, and features the eagle of the Weimar Republic and three crowns derived from coat of arms of Cologne.

Most of the ground level is brought forward towards the tarmac to form roof terraces. The west wing houses a café and a restaurant, while the east wing was occupied by airport and airline offices.

=== Workshops ===
The workshops (Betriebshof) were located in a horseshoe-shaped one-storey building. Staff and maintenance facilities are grouped around an inner courtyard, while several parking garages provided direct airside access for ambulance vehicles and fire engines. The building was heavily altered after the war, and several extensions had to be broken-up to recreate the original state.

=== Hangar I ===
Hangar I has interior dimensions of 68.4 metres (224 feet) in width and 34.8 metres (114 feet) in depth. It is large enough to accommodate several contemporary Junkers Ju 52/3m with a wingspan of 29 metres (95 feet) and a length of 19 metres (62 feet). The building was lastly used as repair facility for heavy military vehicles, and had the original hangar doors replaced with roll-up doors.

=== Control Tower ===
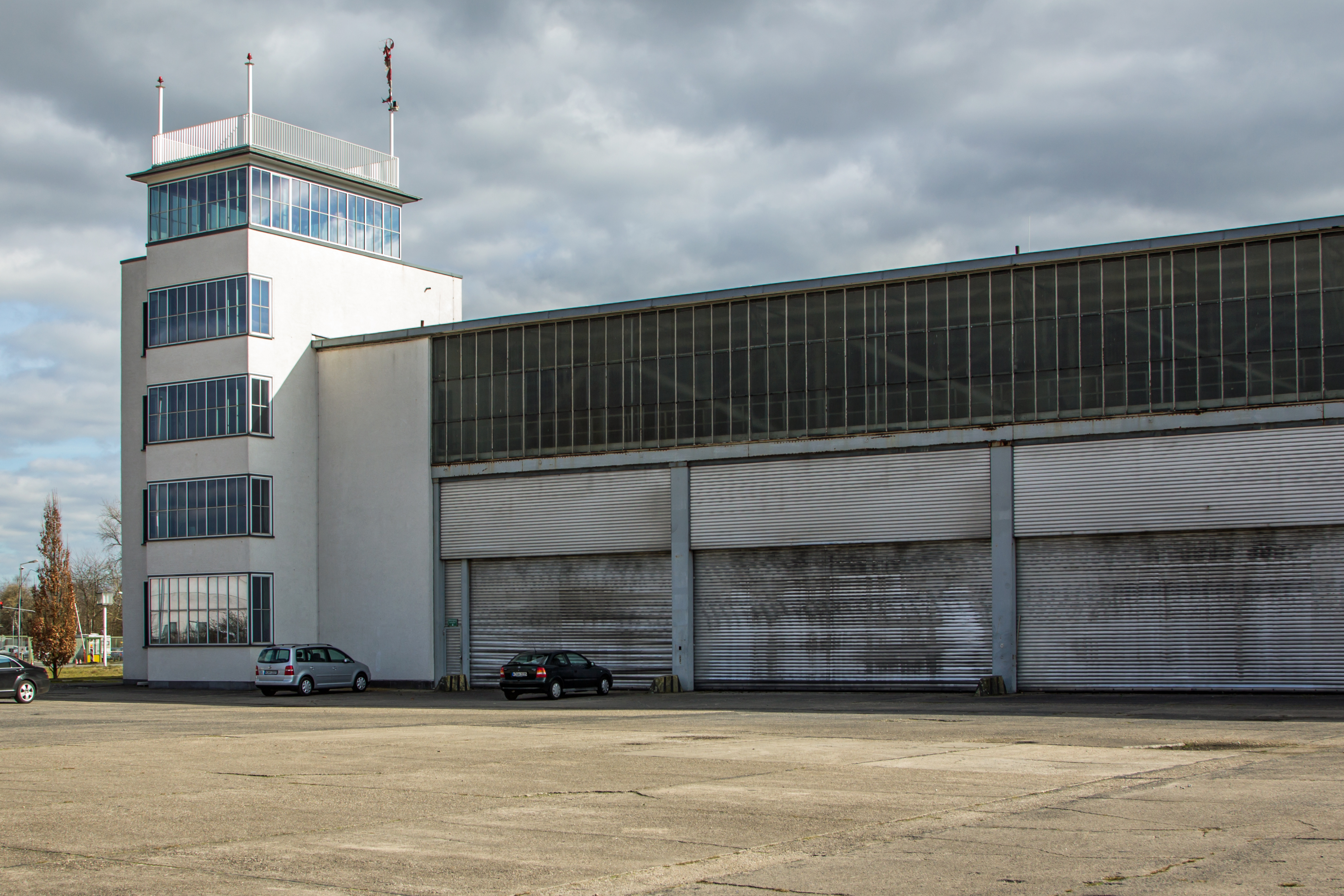
Control Tower and Hangar I

The Control Tower completes the airport complex and sets an antipode to the passenger lobby at the opposite end. The tower features strips of ribbon windows in Bauhaus style. The control level on top is glazed all around and had to be reconstructed after its accidental demolition during the war.

=== Hangar II ===
A second hangar with roughly the same dimensions as Hangar I was erected in right angle behind the control tower. On two sides, the building is surrounded by classrooms that were used for training of flying staff and maintenance personnel. The hangar still features the original hangar doors.

== Current use ==
The premises of the former airfield were primarily used to extend the nearby business park, while the airport buildings underwent restoration.

=== Airport buildings ===
The airport buildings, listed as protected heritage monuments since 1988, were extensively renovated between 1995 and 2007, with the intention to use them for cultural activities and an aviation museum. The apron will be converted into a park to form the centre of the new suburb Butzweilerhof.

=== Airfield ===
The former airfield as well as its surroundings were temporarily used for activities such as music festivals, and then gradually converted into a business park. In 2010, the Cologne Stadtbahn was extended from a nearby terminus to Butzweilerhof.
