= Alick Foord-Kelcey =

Royal Air Force officer (1913-1973)

- Born: 6 April 1913; Canada
- Died: 26 October 1973 (aged 60)
- Military career
- Allegiance: United Kingdom
- Branch: Royal Air Force
- Service years: 1934–1964
- Rank: Air Vice Marshal
- Commands: Assistant Chief of the Air Staff (Intelligence) (1961–64); Signals Command (1961); No. 11 Group (1959–60); RAF Stradishall (1951–54)
- Conflicts: Second World War
- Awards: Commander of the Order of the British Empire; Air Force Cross

Air Vice Marshal Alick Foord-Kelcey, CBE, AFC (6 April 1913 – 26 October 1973) was a Royal Air Force (RAF) officer who served as Air Officer Commanding-in-Chief at Signals Command in 1961.

== RAF career ==
Foord-Kelcey was born in Canada, the son of William Foord-Kelcey, a lawyer, and his wife Irene Marion Ethel Payne. His father was killed in the First World War in 1918 and his mother, who was a sculptor, took her sons to England in 1923. Foord-Kelcey was educated at The King's School, Canterbury and Corpus Christi College, Cambridge, where he joined the Cambridge University Air Squadron and was then commissioned in the Royal Air Force Volunteer Reserve in 1934 before joining the Royal Air Force as a cadet in 1935. He served in the Second World War on the Air Staff at Headquarters British Forces in Aden and as a pilot and instructor in the Western Desert before joining the Directorate of Plans at the Air Ministry. and later a member of the Joint Planning Staff at the Cabinet War Offices.

After the war he became Station Commander at RAF Stradishall and then Senior Air Staff Officer at Headquarters No. 12 (Fighter) Group before joining the staff on the British Joint Staffs Mission to Washington D. C. He was appointed Assistant Chief of Staff (Operations) at Headquarters Allied Air Forces Central Europe in 1955, Air Officer Commanding No. 11 Group in 1959 and Air Officer Commanding-in-Chief at Signals Command in a temporary basis for three months in 1961 before becoming Assistant Chief of the Air Staff (Intelligence) in 1961 and retiring in 1964.

In retirement he was Deputy Director of the Foreign Office Arms Control and Disarmament Research Unit and then Executive Director of the Federation of World Health Foundations in Geneva.

He was appointed a Commander of the Order of the British Empire in the New Year Honours List in 1956.

Military offices
Preceded by Sidney Bufton	Assistant Chief of the Air Staff (Intelligence); 1961–1964	Succeeded by Harold Maguire
Preceded by Sir Leslie Dalton-Morris	Air Officer Commanding-in-Chief Signals Command; March – June 1961	Succeeded by Sir Walter Pretty
Preceded by Victor Bowling	Air Officer Commanding No. 11 Group; 1959–1960	Succeeded by Harold Maguire
