= Walter Pretty =

Royal Air Force Air Marshal (1909-1975)

Sir Walter Pretty
- Born: 2 May 1909
- Died: 17 January 1975 (aged 65)
- Military career
- Allegiance: United Kingdom
- Branch: Royal Air Force
- Service years: 1929–66
- Rank: Air marshal
- Commands: Signals Command (1961–64); No. 1 Radio Operator's School (1941)
- Conflicts: Second World War
- Awards: Knight Commander of the Order of the British Empire; Companion of the Order of the Bath; Mentioned in dispatches (2)

Air Marshal Sir Walter Philip George Pretty, KBE, CB (2 May 1909 – 17 January 1975) was a Royal Air Force officer who served as Air Officer Commanding-in-Chief Signals Command from 1961 until 1964.

== RAF career ==
Educated at Alleyn's School, Pretty joined the Royal Air Force as a cadet in 1929. He served in the Second World War as Station Commander at the Chain Home Low early warning radar base near Clacton, as Officer Commanding No. 1 Radio Operator's School at RAF Cranwell and on the signals staff at Fighter Command.

After the war he became Director-General of Navigational Services at the Ministry of Civil Aviation and then Director of Electronics Research and Development at the Ministry of Supply before being appointed Air Officer Administration at Headquarters Second Tactical Air Force in 1955. He went on to be Director-General of Organisation at the Air Ministry in 1958, Air Officer Commanding-in-Chief at Signals Command in 1961 and Deputy Chief of the Defence Staff (Personnel & Logistics) in 1964 before retiring in 1966.

He lived near Cobham in Surrey and became President of the Edward Alleyn Club. He married Betty Methven in 1940 and they had four children: Audrey, Beryl, Carol (mother of comedian Marcus Brigstocke), and Derek.

Military offices
Preceded by Alick Foord-Kelcey	Air Officer Commanding-in-Chief Signals Command; 1961–1964	Succeeded by Sir Thomas Shirley
