= De Havilland Hornet Moth =

British single-engined biplane built 1935–38

DH.87 Hornet Moth
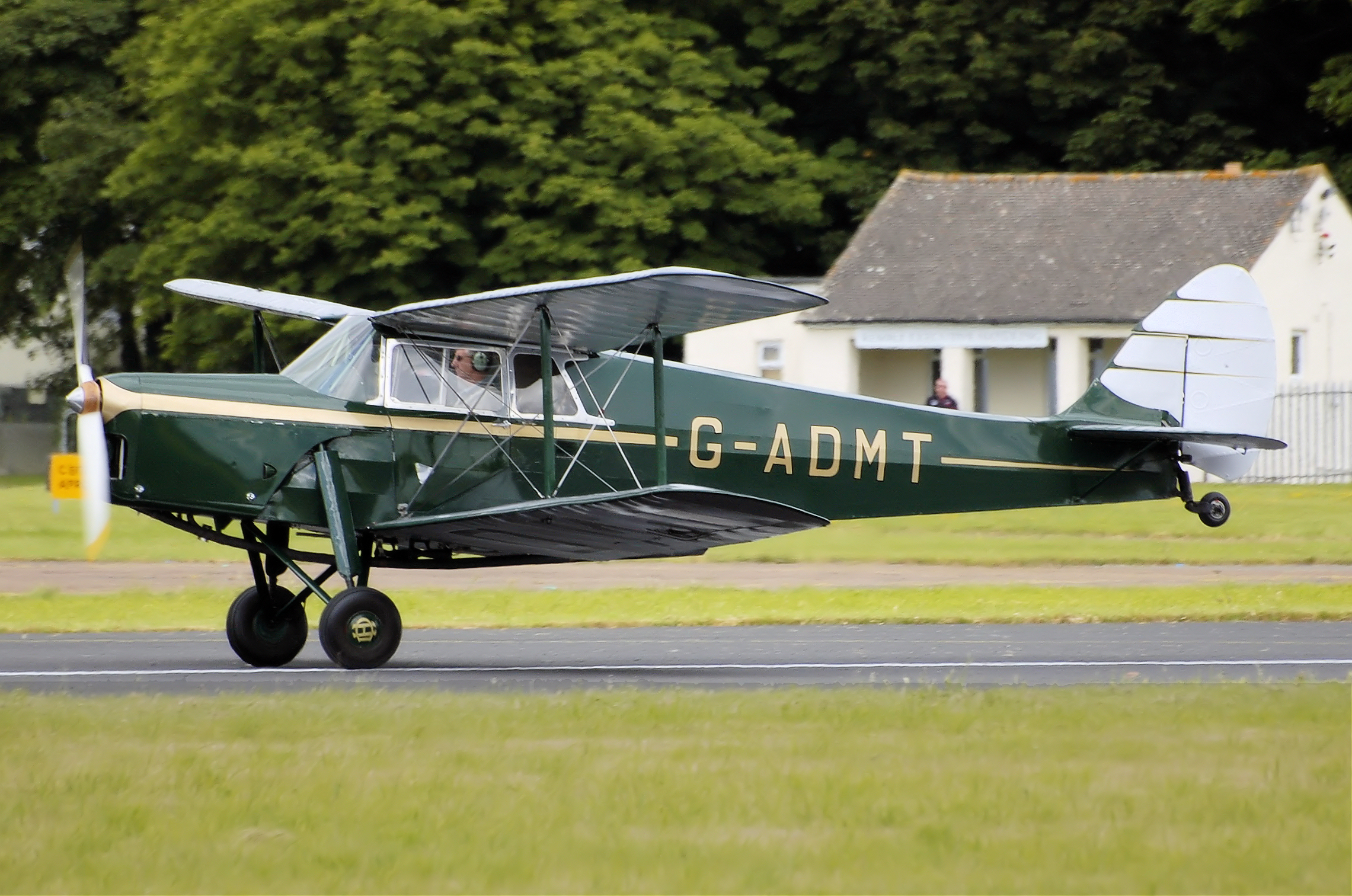
- 1936 de Havilland DH.87B Hornet Moth

General information
- Type: Trainer and Tourer
- Manufacturer: de Havilland
- Status: In limited service
- Primary user: private owner pilots
- Number built: 164

History
- Manufactured: 1935–1938
- First flight: 9 May 1934

The de Havilland DH.87 Hornet Moth is a single-engined cabin biplane designed by the de Havilland Aircraft Company in 1934 as a potential replacement for its highly successful de Havilland Tiger Moth trainer. Although its side-by-side two-seat cabin made it closer in configuration to the modern aircraft that military trainee pilots would later fly, there was no interest from the RAF and the aircraft was put into production for private buyers.

== Design and development ==
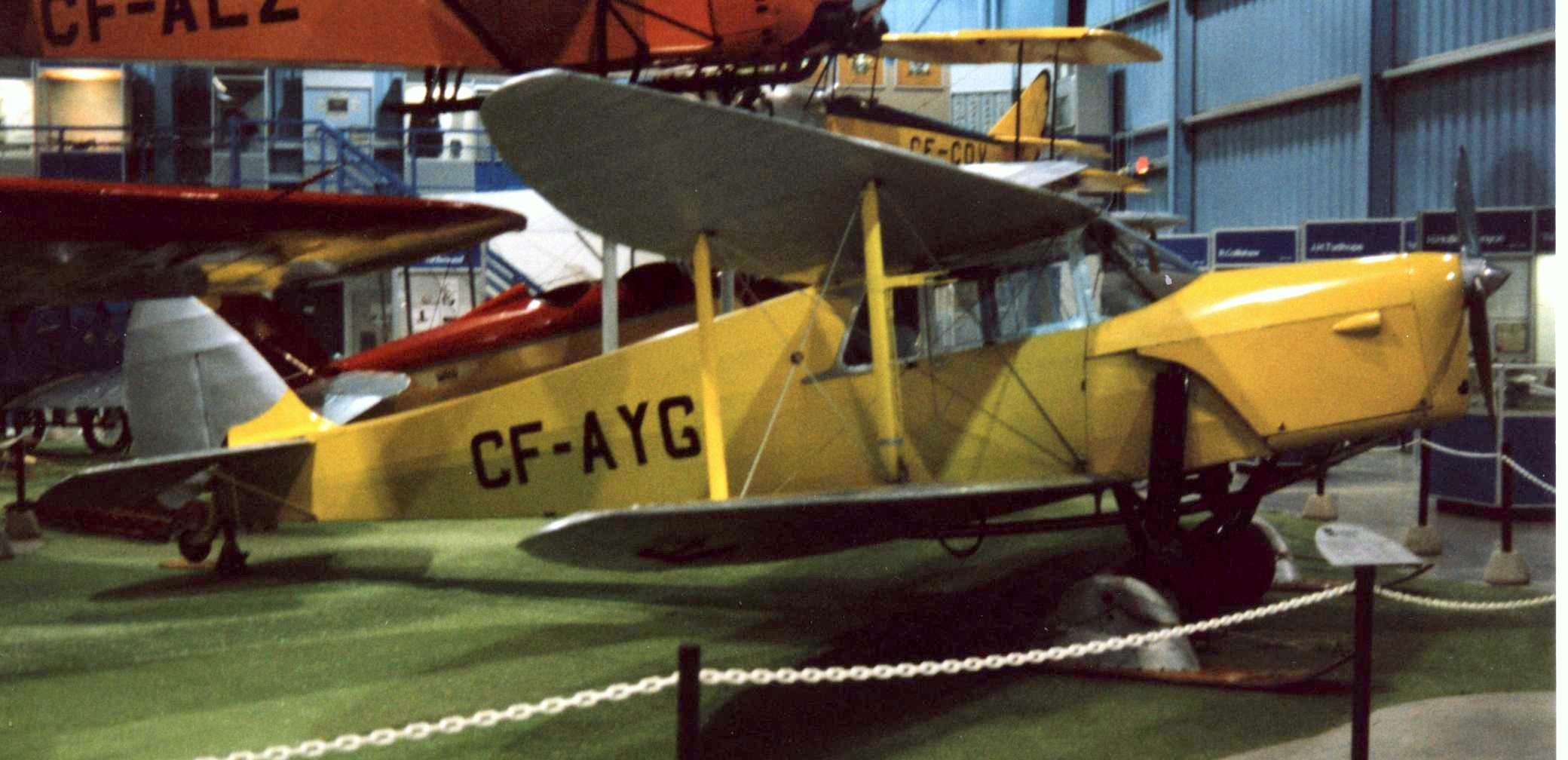
DH.87A Hornet Moth retaining the original tapered wing design. Wetaskiwin, Alberta, June 1996

The prototype first flew at Hatfield on 9 May 1934 and, with two other pre-production aircraft, embarked on an extensive test program that resulted in the first production aircraft (designated DH.87A) completed in August 1935 having wings of greater outboard taper. These were found to cause problems, especially when landing in three-point attitude: there was a tendency for the tips to stall, causing embarrassment to the pilot and often damage to the aeroplane. From early 1936, de Havilland offered owners of the DH.87A replacement wings of the new squarer shape at a reduced price in exchange for the original wings. Designated DH.87B, new aircraft from about manufacture Number 68 were built with the new square wings. This wing reduced the overall span by 8 inches (20 cm). The alterations slightly increased overall weight at some penalty to performance.

A total of 164 aircraft were produced, of which 84 were placed on the British Register. Over 70 British Hornet Moths were impressed for military service at the start of the Second World War. In early 1940, the RAF used Hornet Moths to carry out unarmed coastal patrols to deter German submarines, while later in the war, many were used as liaison aircraft. South Africa requisitioned 19 Hornet Moths, with the aircraft used for communications duties, while at least three Hornet Moths were impressed into military duties in India.

Small numbers survived the war and with time became highly prized by vintage aircraft enthusiasts. A small number are still flying, over eighty years after production ceased.

== Variants ==
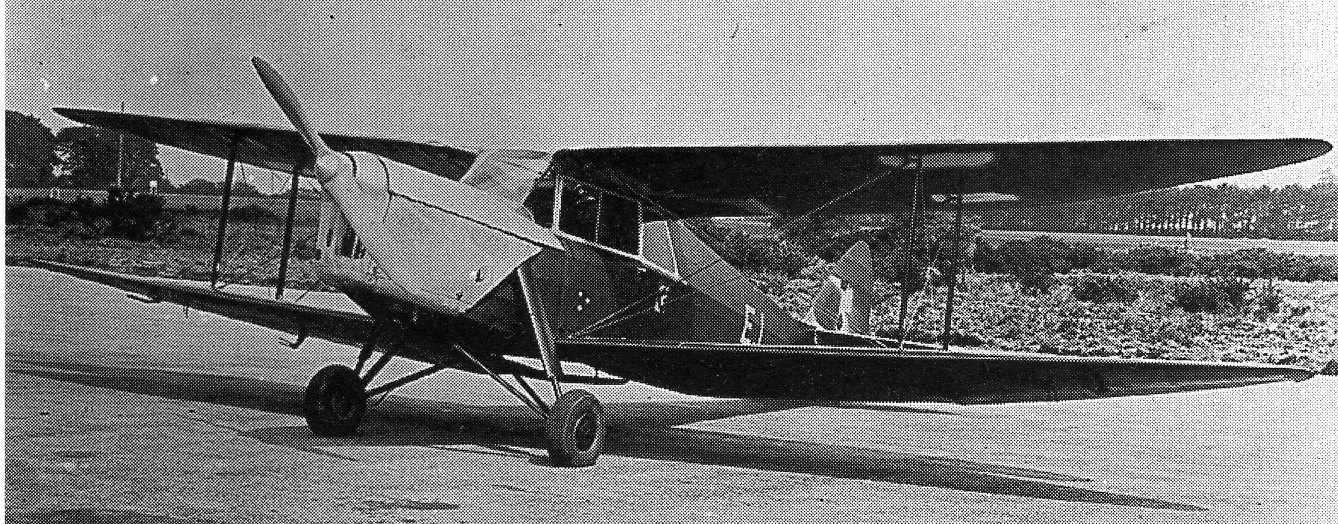
The second Hornet Moth

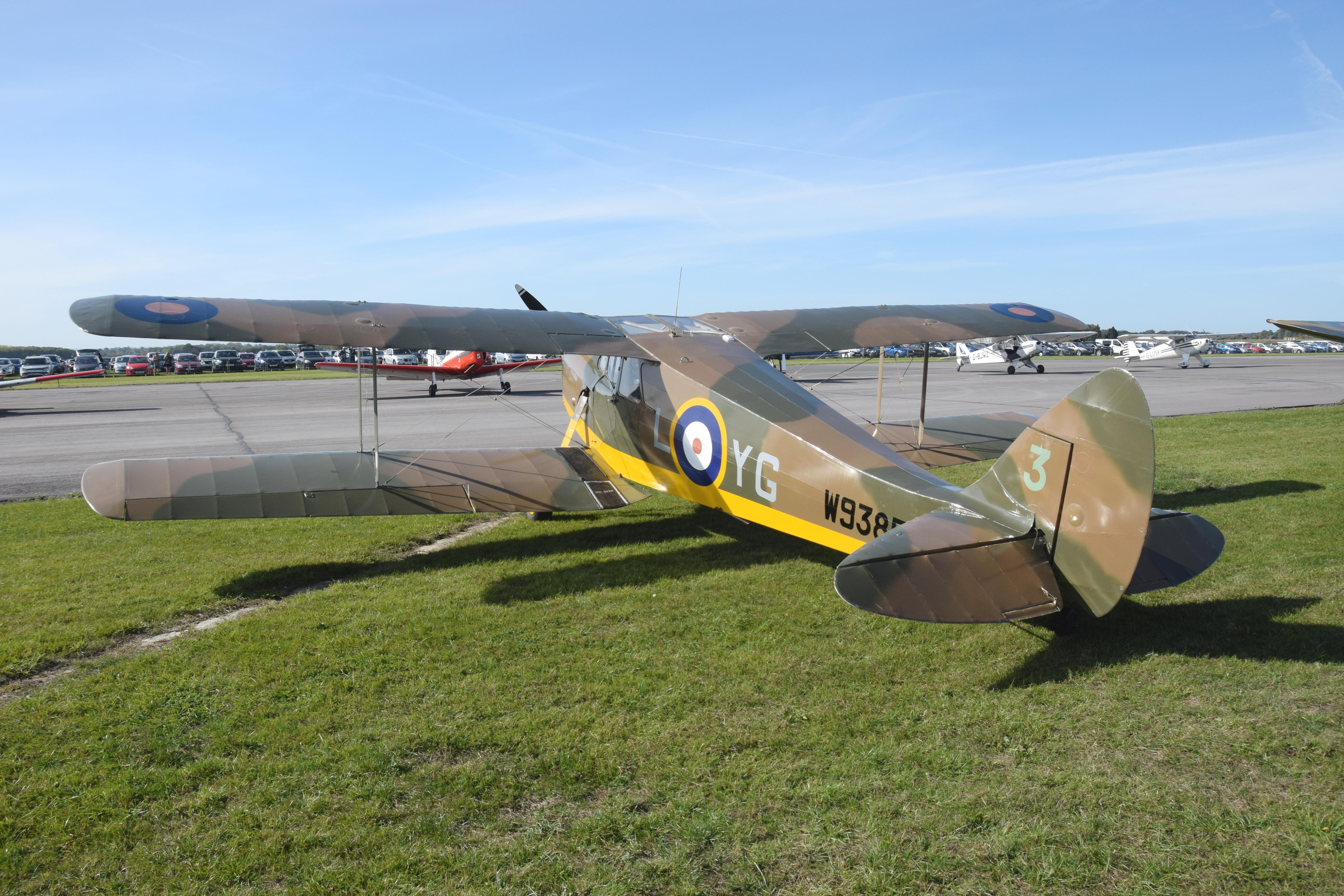
ex-RAF 1936 de Havilland DH.87B Hornet Moth at Cotswold Airport, England, in 2018

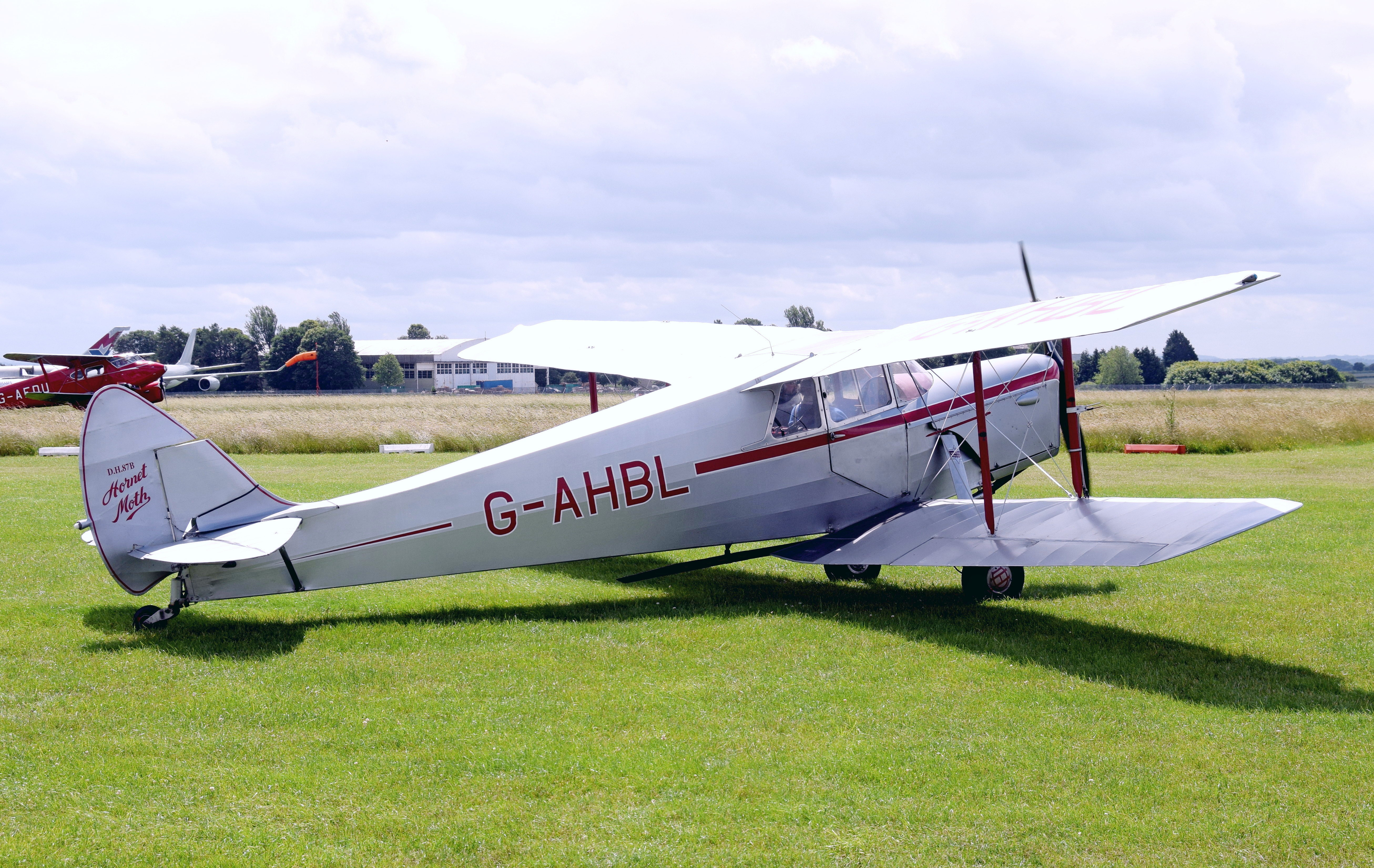
DH.87B Hornet Moth G-AHBL, Kemble (2019)

- DH.87 Hornet Moth : prototypes
- DH.87A Hornet Moth : production model
- DH.87B Hornet Moth : production model with wing modification

== Operators ==
=== Civil charter operators and pilots 1935–2009 ===
United Kingdom
Australia
Austria
Belgium
Canada
Denmark
France
India
South Africa
Spain
Switzerland
Turkey - TC-ARK (photo exists)

=== Military operators ===
France

- L'Armée de l'Air

Portugal

- Portuguese Air Force

South Africa

- South African Air Force

United Kingdom

- Royal Air Force (1940–1945)
  - No. 24 Squadron RAF
  - No. 49 Squadron RAF
  - No. 116 Squadron RAF
  - No. 510 Squadron RAF
  - No. 526 Squadron RAF
  - No. 527 Squadron RAF
  - No. 528 Squadron RAF
  - No. 529 Squadron RAF
- Royal Navy Fleet Air Arm
  - One aircraft impressed and four from Canada

== Specifications (DH.87B) ==
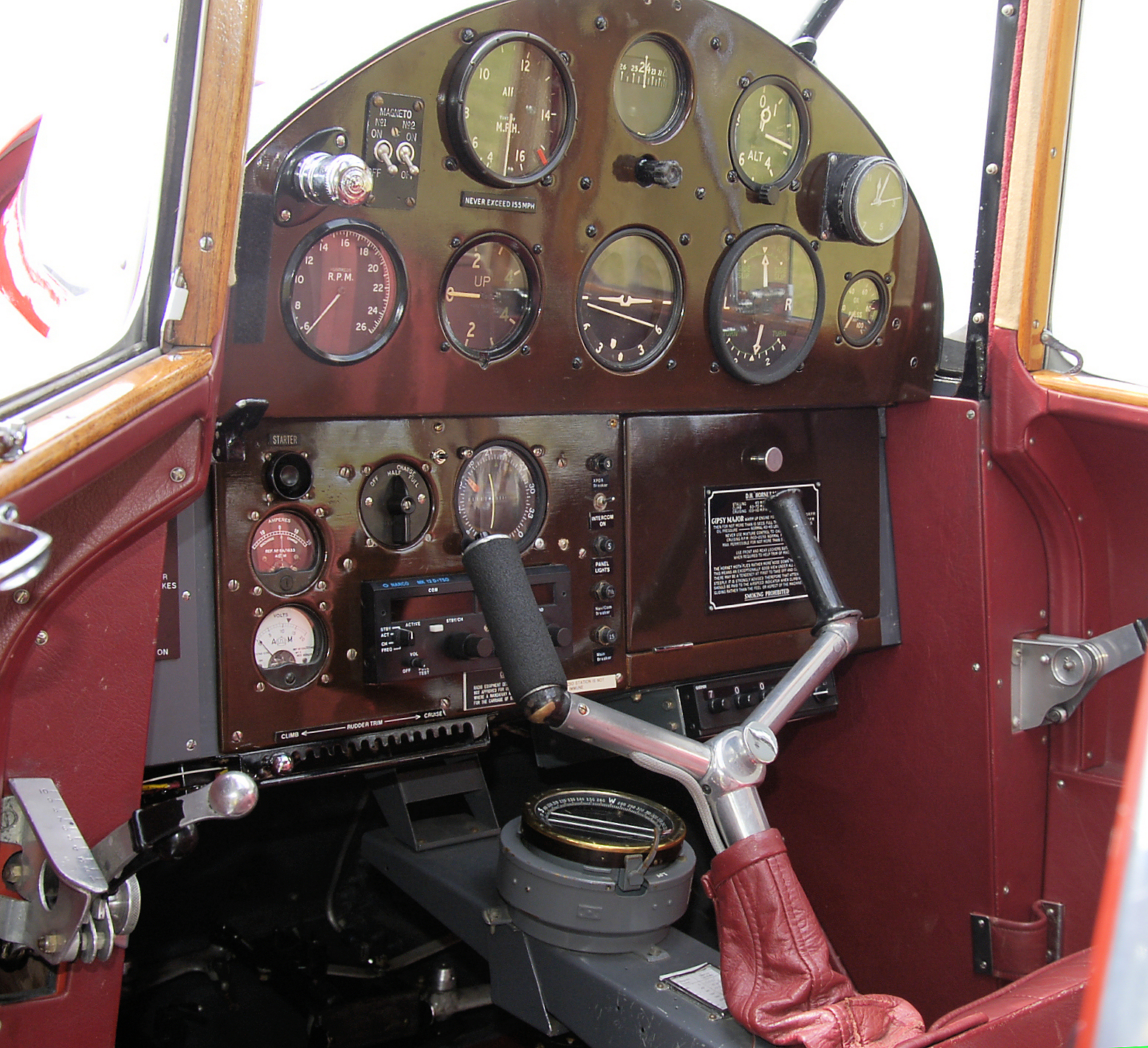
1936 de Havilland DH87B Hornet Moth cockpit

Data from De Havilland Aircraft since 1909

General characteristics

- Crew: 1
- Capacity: 1 passenger / trainee
- Length: 24 ft 11 1/2 in (7.61 m)
- Wingspan: 31 ft 11 in (9.73 m)
- Width: 10 ft 9 1/2 in (3.29 m)
- Height: 6 ft 7 in (2.01 m)
- Wing area: 244.5 sq ft (22.71 m^{2})
- Airfoil: RAF 15
- Empty weight: 1,241 lb (563 kg)
- Gross weight: 1,950 lb (885 kg)
- Fuel capacity: 35 imp gal (42 US gal; 159 L) fuel in fuselage tank
- Powerplant: 1 × de Havilland Gipsy Major I 4-cylinder air-cooled inverted in-line piston engine, 130 hp (97 kW)
- Propellers: 2-bladed fixed-pitch propeller

Performance

- Maximum speed: 124 mph (200 km/h, 108 kn) at sea level
- Cruise speed: 105 mph (169 km/h, 91 kn) at 1,000 ft (305 m)
- Stall speed: 40 mph (64 km/h, 35 kn)
- Range: 620 mi (1,000 km, 540 nmi)
- Service ceiling: 14,800 ft (4,500 m)
- Rate of climb: 690 ft/min (3.5 m/s)
- Time to altitude: 5,000 ft (1,524 m) in 8 minutes 45 seconds
- Wing loading: 7.97 lb/sq ft (38.9 kg/m^{2})
- Power/mass: 0.067 hp/lb (0.110 kW/kg)

== Bibliography ==
- Comas, Matthieu (September–October 2020). "So British!: 1939–1940, les avions britanniques dans l'Armée de l'Air" [So British!: British Aircraft in the French Air Force 1939–1940]. Avions (in French). No. 236. pp. 38–61. ISSN 1243-8650.
- Grey, C. G.; Bridgman, Leonard, eds. (1938). Jane's All the World's Aircraft 1938. London: Sampson Low, Marston & Co. OCLC 650273545.
- Jackson, A. J. (1987). De Havilland Aircraft since 1909 (3rd ed.). London: Putnam. ISBN 0-85177-802-X.
- McKay, Stuart (April 2002). "Database: D.H.87 Hornet Moth". Aeroplane. Vol. 30, no. 4. pp. 65–81. ISSN 0143-7240.
- Sturtivant, Ray; Burrow, Mick (1995). Fleet Air Arm Aircraft 1939 to 1945. Tunbridge Wells: Air-Britain (Historians) Ltd. ISBN 0-85130-232-7.
