= RAF Butzweilerhof =

Former RAF station in Cologne, Germany

RAF Butzweilerhof
- Cologne, North Rhine-Westphalia in Germany

Site information
- Owner: Ministry of Defence (UK)
- Operator: Royal Air Force
- Controlled by: RAF Second Tactical Air Force; Royal Air Force Germany

Location
- Shown within North Rhine-Westphalia, Germany RAF Butzweilerhof (Germany)
- Coordinates: 50°59′5.3″N 6°53′29.1″E

Site history
- Built: 1951; 75 years ago
- In use: August 1951 - 27 January 1967
- Fate: closed

Airfield information
- Identifiers: ICAO: ETBB
- Elevation: 48 metres (157 ft) AMSL
Runways
Direction	Length and surface
04/22	650 metres (2,133 ft) asphalt
- Motto: Per Vires Pax (Latin: Peace through strength)

Royal Air Force Butzweilerhof, commonly known as RAF Butzweilerhof was a Royal Air Force station in the middle west of Germany situated in the northern suburbs of Cologne (German: Köln). The station's motto was Per Vires Pax, and the station badge depicts the Cologne Cathedral rising above the waters.

== History and the RAF ==
From the 1920s, Butzweilerhof was the main civil airport for Cologne, but was taken over by the Royal Air Force (RAF) during August 1951.(WP:SELFPUBLISH) RAF aircraft ceased flying in 1965, and the RAF formally left Butzweilerhof, closing down the station on 27 January 1967. The few civilian employees remaining at the beginning of 1967 were required to leave by the end of January, and on 31 January 1967, Butzweilerhof airfield was officially handed over to the Bundeswehr.

In 1957, it was the home for The Band of RAF Germany.

=== Units ===
- A detachment of No. 16 Squadron RAF between 7 September and 31 October 1953
- No. 68 Squadron RAF, operating the Gloster Meteor NF11(WP:SELFPUBLISH)
- No. 87 Squadron RAF, operating the Gloster Meteor NF11(WP:SELFPUBLISH)
- A detachment of No. 94 Squadron RAF between 7 September and 31 October 1953
- A detachment of No. 145 Squadron RAF between 7 September and 31 October 1953
- No. 26 Signals Unit RAF (previously No. 5 Signals Wing)
- No. 477 Signals Unit RAF
- No. 5 (Signals) Wing RAF commanding unit for HF/direction finding units in Germany from August 1958 to September 1966(WP:SELFPUBLISH)
- No. 588 Signals Unit RAF
- 2nd Tactical Air Force Forward Repair Unit RAF from March 1952 to December 1966
- No. 52 Repair Unit (Plant) RAF from August 1950 to December 1955
- No. 420 Repair and Salvage Squadron RAF (February 1957-December 1961)(WP:SELFPUBLISH)
- No. 6209 Bomb Disposal Flight RAF
- No. 4 Mobile Repair & Salvage Unit RAF from September to December 1956
- RAF Butzweilerhof Station Flight

== Accidents and incidents ==
- On 24 December 1944, as part of a larger group of Royal Air Force aircraft tasked with bombing targets around the city of Cologne, an Avro Lancaster ND388 was destroyed in the air, its tail section crash landed at Butzweilerhof.

== Butzweilerhof today ==
A very small part of the old airfield was used by the Bundeswehr (German army) until 30 December 2007, after which the Butzweilerkaserne was closed and turned into a mixed retail / residential area. The rest of the land was re-developed into film studios (MMC) between 1998 and 1999. On the film studio lot, a renovated hangar still bears the inscription of the Belgian Army who were stationed at Butzweiler. The remaining land has now been divided up for residential and office re-development. The Butzweilerhof main airport terminal building, opened in 1926 is protected as a listed building and is undergoing renovations.

The terminal building restoration has now (2007) been largely completed. In late December 2007, the bulldozers moved in to demolish most, if not all, of the remaining RAF site buildings. As of December 2008, the portion of the former Kaserne to the right of the main gate was completely cleared of the former military buildings. Most of the vacated property is being redeveloped into a strip mall consisting of a new IKEA store and several other retailers. The Kölner Verkehrsbetriebe (KVB) is also in the process of constructing a new 1.85 kilometres (1.15 miles) long extension from the current Ossendorf terminus into the Butzweilerhof/Gewerbegebiet Ossendorf area. Three new stations (Köhlstrasse, Butzweiler/IKEA and the new terminus, Von-Hünefeld-Strasse) will be added to the existing Line 5. This extension is scheduled to open in December 2010.
