= No. 526 Squadron RAF =

Defunct flying squadron of the Royal Air Force

- Active: 15 June 1943 – 1 May 1945
- Country: United Kingdom
- Branch: Royal Air Force
- Role: Calibration and Communications
- Part of: No. 60 Group RAF, RAF Fighter Command

Insignia
- Squadron Codes: MD (Jun 1943 – May 1945)

No. 526 Squadron of the Royal Air Force was a British Second World War calibration and communications squadron.

== History ==
No. 526 Squadron was formed on 15 June 1943 at RAF Longman, Inverness, Scotland from the calibration flights of Nos. 70, 71 and 72 Wing RAF to carry out calibration duties in northern Scotland. It had a mixture of mainly twin-engined aircraft, including the Bristol Blenheim and Airspeed Oxford. The squadron also operated the de Havilland Dominie and de Havilland Hornet Moth, which apart from calibration were also used for communications duties. The squadron was disbanded on 1 May 1945 when it was merged into 527 Squadron.

== Aircraft operated ==
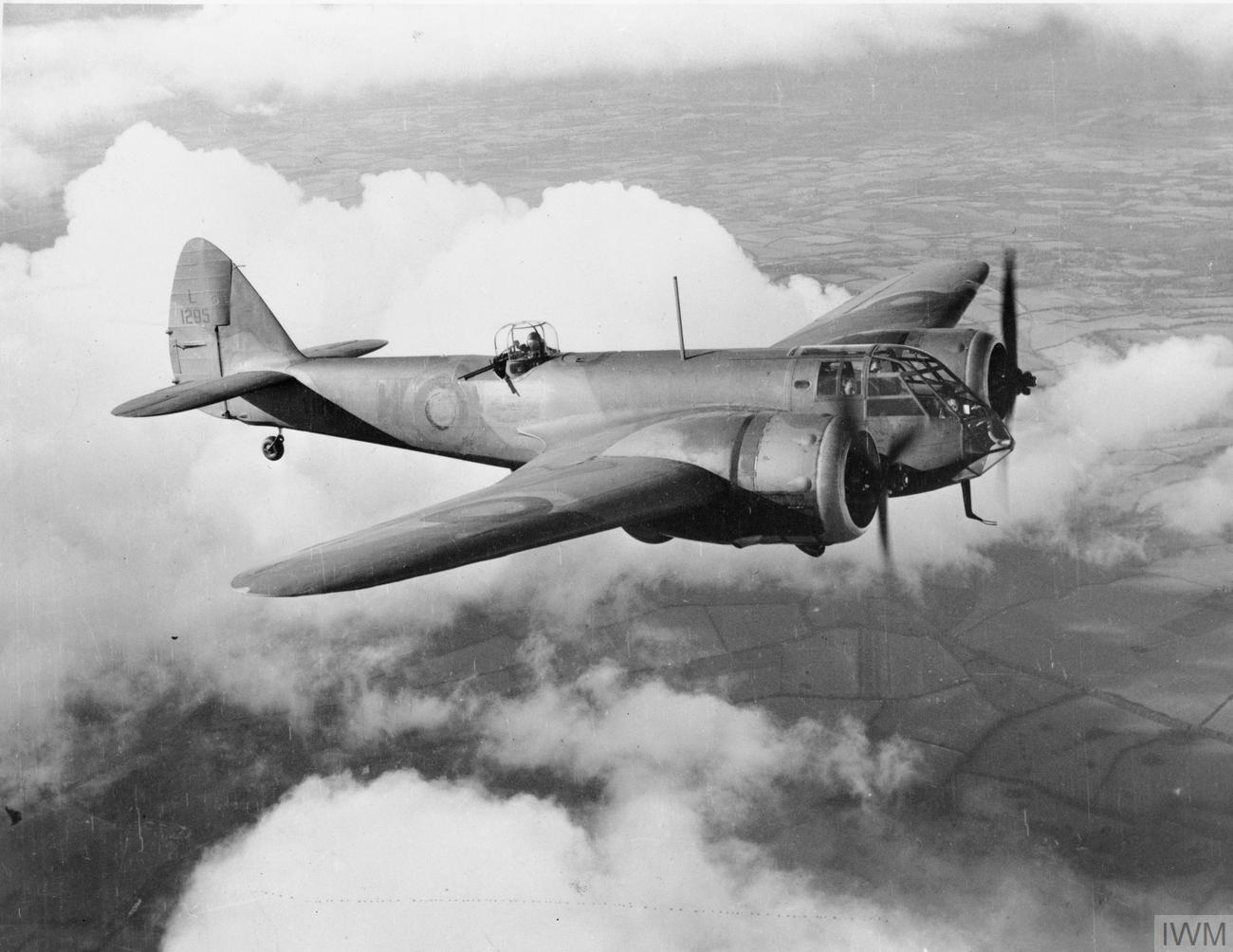
Bristol Blenheim

Aircraft operated by no. 526 Squadron RAF, data from
From	To	Aircraft	Version
June 1943	May 1945	Bristol Blenheim	Mk.IV
June 1943	May 1945	de Havilland Hornet Moth	
June 1943	May 1945	Airspeed Oxford	Mk.I
August 1943	May 1945	de Havilland Dominie	Mk.I

== Squadron bases ==
Bases and airfields used by no. 526 Squadron RAF, data from
From	To	Base	Remark
June 1943	May 1945	RAF Longman, Inverness, Scotland	Dets. at RAF Tealing, Angus, Scotland and in Northern Ireland
