= No. 528 Squadron RAF =

- Active: 28 Jun 1943 – 1 Sep 1944
- Country: United Kingdom
- Branch: Royal Air Force
- Role: Radar calibration

Insignia
- Squadron Codes: OS (Jun 1943 – Sep 1944)

No. 528 Squadron RAF was a radar calibration unit of the Royal Air Force during the Second World War, active from June 1943 until September 1944.

== History ==
No. 528 Squadron was formed on 28 June 1943 at RAF Filton for radar calibration duties in the West Country, using Bristol Blenheims and de Havilland Hornet Moths. On 15 May 1944 the squadron moved north to RAF Digby, Lincolnshire for similar tasks, until it was disbanded on 1 September 1944 by being absorbed into No. 527 Squadron RAF.

== Aircraft operated ==
Aircraft operated by No. 528 Squadron, data from
From	To	Aircraft	Version
June 1943	September 1944	Bristol Blenheim	Mk.IV
June 1943	September 1944	de Havilland Hornet Moth	

== Squadron bases ==
Bases and airfields used by No. 528 Squadron RAF, data from
From	To	Base
28 June 1943	15 May 1944	RAF Filton, Gloucestershire
15 May 1944	1 September 1944	RAF Digby, Lincolnshire
