= No. 527 Squadron RAF =

- Active: 15 Jun 1943 – 15 Apr 1946; 1 Aug 1952 – 21 Aug 1958
- Country: United Kingdom
- Branch: Royal Air Force
- Role: Radar calibration
- Part of: No. 60 Group RAF, Fighter Command (43–46); No. 90 (Signals) Group RAF, Home Command (52–58)
- Motto(s): Silently we serve

Insignia
- Squadron Badge heraldry: In front of a flash of lightning, a crystal
- Squadron Codes: WN (Jun 1943 – Apr 1946)

No. 527 Squadron RAF was a radar calibration unit of the Royal Air Force between 1943 and 1958.

== History ==
=== Formation ===
No. 527 Squadron was formed from various calibration flights at RAF Castle Camps, Cambridgeshire on 15 June 1943 for radar calibration duties with Bristol Blenheims and Hawker Hurricanes. The squadron was engaged with the calibration of radar stations in southern England and East Anglia. The need for calibration units lessened considerably in 1944, so the squadron absorbed No. 528 Squadron RAF on 1 September 1944, extending its coverage in the process to Lincolnshire, and No. 526 Squadron RAF on 1 May 1945, adding the de Havilland Hornet Moths, Airspeed Oxfords and de Havilland Dominies of these units to its strength. The squadron standardised hereafter on Spitfires, Wellingtons, Oxfords and Dominies, the latter -old aircraft of 526 Squadron- still being based at RAF Longman, Inverness for communications flying. In November 1945, the squadron moved to RAF Watton, Norfolk where it disbanded on 15 April 1946.

=== Reformation ===
The squadron reformed on 1 August 1952 at RAF Watton, when the 'N' and 'R' Calibration Squadrons of the Central Signal Establishment were redesignated to No. 527 Squadron. A great variety of types, amongst them Avro Lincolns, Avro Ansons, English Electric Canberras and Gloster Meteors, were flown for high-level calibration until 21 August 1958, when the unit was disbanded by being renumbered to No. 245 Squadron RAF.

== Aircraft operated ==
Aircraft operated by No. 527 Squadron RAF, data from
From	To	Aircraft	Version
June 1943	May 1945	Bristol Blenheim	Mk.IV
June 1943	April 1944	Hawker Hurricane	Mk.I
December 1943	September 1944	de Havilland Hornet Moth	
February 1944	April 1945	Hawker Hurricane	Mk.IIb
July 1944	April 1946	Supermarine Spitfire	Mk.Vb
September 1944	April 1946	Airspeed Oxford	Mk.II
April 1945	April 1946	Vickers Wellington	Mk.X
May 1945	April 1946	de Havilland Dominie	Mk.I
August 1952	March 1954	Avro Anson	C.19
August 1952	January 1954	de Havilland Mosquito	B.35
August 1952	May 1957	Avro Lincoln	B.2
June 1953	July 1955	Gloster Meteor	NF.11
June 1954	August 1958	Vickers Varsity	T.1
August 1954	October 1955	Gloster Meteor	NF.14
December 1954	August 1958	English Electric Canberra	B.2
April 1956	June 1956	English Electric Canberra	PR.7
September 1957	November 1957	Gloster Meteor	NF.11

== Squadron bases ==
Bases and airfields used by No. 527 Squadron RAF, data from
From	To	Base	Remark
15 June 1943	28 February 1944	RAF Castle Camps, Cambridgeshire	
28 February 1944	28 April 1944	RAF Snailwell, Suffolk	
28 April 1944	8 November 1945	RAF Digby, Lincolnshire	Dets at RAF Longman, Inverness and RAF Tealing, Angus
8 November 1945	15 April 1946	RAF Watton, Norfolk	
1 August 1952	21 August 1958	RAF Watton, Norfolk	
