= No. 60 Group RAF =

Former Royal Air Force operations group

No. 60 (Signals) Group RAF
- Royal Air Force Ensign
- Active: 23 February 1940 - 25 April 1946
- Country: United Kingdom
- Branch: Royal Air Force
- Type: Royal Air Force group
- Role: Chain Home radar stations
- Part of: RAF Fighter Command
- Garrison/HQ: Oxenden, Plantation Road, Leighton Buzzard
- Mottos: Latin: vigilans ("watching")
- Engagements: Second World War

Commanders
- Notable commanders: Air Vice-Marshal William Edward Theak CB, CBE

No. 60 Group RAF (60 Gp) was a group of the British Royal Air Force. It was established in 1940 with the headquarters in Leighton Buzzard, as part of RAF Fighter Command.

== History ==
It controlled the electronic Air defence radar network across Britain. It was responsible for all civilian and service personnel involved in the operation, maintenance and calibration of the Chain Home radar stations.

The group was formally established within the Directorate of Signals on 23 February 1940.

Order of Battle: May 1941:

- 70, 71, 72, 73, 74, 75, 76, 77 & No. 78 Wing RAF

April 1942:

- 70, 71, 72, 73, 74, 75, 76, 77, 78, & No. 79 Wing RAF

April 1943:

- 70, 71, 72, 73, 74, 75, 76, 77, 78 & No. 79 Wing RAF

July 1944:

- 70, 73, 75, 78 & No. 84 Wing RAF

July 1945:

- No. 527 Squadron RAF at RAF Digby with the de Havilland Dominie, No. 529 Squadron RAF at RAF Henley-on-Thames with the Sikorsky Hoverfly, 70, 73, 75 & No. 78 Wing RAF

In June 1944 on the eve of D-Day the group consisted of No. 70 Wing RAF (Inverness, northern signals, including No. 526 Squadron RAF at RAF Inverness carrying out calibration duties); Nos 73, 75, 78, and 80 Wings, twelve separate radar stations, mostly in Ireland, and three specialist units, including the RAF Section of the Telecommunications Research Establishment at Malvern.

By January 1945 it was still part of Fighter Command. It was amalgamated with No. 26 Group RAF to become together No. 90 (Signals) Group RAF on 25 April 1946. Its last commander was Air Vice-Marshal W E Theak.

== History of No. 26 Group RAF ==
No. 26 Group RAF was formed during August 1918 in the First World War controlling units within Egypt, it was disbanded during March 1919. The group was reformed on 1 December 1937 as No. 26 (Training) Group at The Hyde, Hendon, London controlling all the Elementary and Reserve Flying Training Schools. It was redesignated to No. 50 Group RAF on 1 February 1939. It was reformed on 12 February 1940 at RAF Cranwell within RAF Training Command as No. 26 (Signals) Group RAF. It initially controlled the Wireless Schools before being expanded to control all grounds, air & marine signals equipment, direction finding and beam approach stations. It was merged with No. 60 Group and disbanded into No. 90 Group RAF on 25 April 1945.

Order of Battle May 1941 - HQ at Langley

- No. 109 Squadron RAF at RAF Boscombe Down, No. 1 Radio School RAF at RAF Cranwell and No. 3 Radio School RAF at RAF Prestwick

April 1942 - HQ at Langley Hall, Slough

- Controls 83 stations in No. 80 Wing RAF and No. 81 Wing RAF
