= No. 80 Wing RAF =

No. 80 Wing RAF
- Active: 1 July 1918–1 March 1919; 7 October 1940–24 September 1945; 1 August 1953–15 March 1957
- Country: United Kingdom
- Branch: Royal Air Force
- Role: Air superiority (WWI); Electronic Countermeasures (WWII)
- Size: Wing
- Part of: No. 100 Group RAF (1943–45)
- Garrison/HQ: Serny, France (WWI); RAF Radlett (WWII)

Commanders
- Notable commanders: Wing Commander Edward Addison (1940–43)

No. 80 Wing RAF was a unit of the Royal Air Force (RAF) during both World Wars and briefly in the 1950s. In the last months of World War I it controlled RAF and Australian Flying Corps (AFC) fighter squadrons. It was reformed in 1940 to operate electronic countermeasures in the Battle of the Beams.

== First World War ==
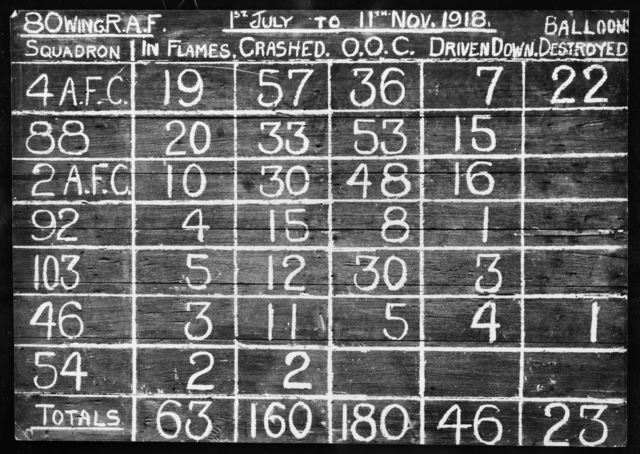
A scoreboard listing the claims for aircraft destroyed by No. 80 Wing between July and November 1918.

No. 80 Wing was formed at Serny, Pas-de-Calais, on 1 July 1918, as an Army Wing of squadrons equipped with scout (fighter) aircraft. From 26 June, it was commanded by Lieutenant-Colonel Louis Strange.

The wing specialised in large-scale raids against airfields belonging to the Imperial German Air Service (Luftstreitkräfte ).

Its subordinate squadrons were:

- 2 Squadron AFC, Australian Flying Corps
- 4 Squadron AFC, Australian Flying Corps
- 46 Squadron RAF
- 54 Squadron RAF
- 88 Squadron RAF
- 92 Squadron RAF
- 103 Squadron RAF

No. 80 Wing was disbanded on 1 March 1919.

== Second World War ==
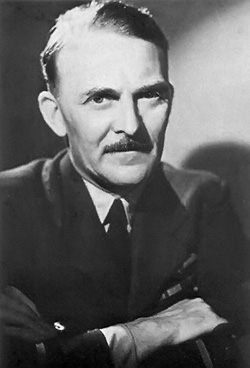
Wing Commander Edward Addison

In June 1940, a RAF Radio Counter-Measures (RCM) unit was formed at a requisitioned country hotel, Aldenham Lodge, in Radlett, Hertfordshire, to provide electronic countermeasures (ECM) and intelligence on enemy radio/radar systems. On 7 October, it was renamed 80 (Signals) Wing, with the motto "Confusion to Our Enemies". 80 Wing worked under the immediate control of the Air Ministry, but kept in close touch with RAF Fighter Command's operations room at RAF Bentley Priory.

The main role of RCM/80 Wing initially was jamming the German radio navigation system Knickebein, which assisted Luftwaffe bombers raiding targets in the UK. Its founding commander was Wing Commander Edward Addison, a signals specialist who had recently returned from the Middle East. The technical design of countermeasures was handled by a section under Dr Robert Cockburn at the Telecommunications Research Establishment at Swanage, Dorset. Both organisations were given the highest priority.

The first jammers developed at Swanage were simple diathermy sets to transmit a 'mush' of noise on the Knickebein frequency. These were quickly superseded by higher powered equipment called 'Aspirins' (to deal with the Knickebein beams, which were codenamed 'Headaches'). Knickebein was soon superseded by X-Gerät and Y-Gerät directional beams, which in turn were eventually jammed by 80 Wing in the ongoing Battle of the Beams.

On 23/24 April 1942, the Luftwaffe began a new campaign against the UK (the Baedeker Blitz ) with a raid on Exeter, followed by a series of raids on other provincial cities. Scientific intelligence gave about six weeks' warning that these raids would employ X-Gerät with a new supersonic modulation frequency. 80 Wing was able to add supersonic modulation to its jammers, but was briefed not to employ this countermeasure until listening stations had confirmed that the Luftwaffe was indeed using the new technique. Unfortunately, the designers of the listening receivers had overlooked the fact that supersonic reception involves a wider bandwidth than normal in the high frequency circuits of the receivers. Once this was corrected, 80 Wing was able to jam the beam so successfully that the 50 per cent success rate (bombs on target) of the early Baedeker raids dropped to 13 per cent and the campaign petered out. The Air Staff's scientific intelligence adviser, Dr R.V. Jones, estimated that the delay in allowing 80 Wing to begin jamming cost about 400 lives and another 600 serious injuries, while Anti-Aircraft Command was forced to redeploy hundreds of guns to cover potential Baedeker targets.

By the end of 1942, 80 Wing included a flying unit, known as the Wireless Intelligence and Development Unit (WIDU) at RAF Boscombe Down in Wiltshire, which was later renamed No. 109 Squadron RAF. Among other roles, 109 Sqn simulated enemy air raids, to test ECM equipment.

The headquarters of 80 Wing later moved to the Handley-Page factory aerodrome at Radlett, also known as RAF Radlett. From November 1943, it became part of No. 100 Group RAF – a larger formation based at Radlett devoted to ECM and commanded by Addison (by now promoted to Air commodore and later to Air vice-marshal). The wing controlled Meacon beacons, as well as other countermeasures and radio/radar intelligence work.

The Wing's Meconing capability was developed for overseas operation and two units were active in North Africa in 1943.Towards the end of'43 they transferred to Italy following the allied invasion, the main body of the unit flew to Taranto, while 4 x 60 ft articulated lorries full of operational gear crossed by sea to Naples, then was set up briefly in the Apennines before the unit was called home. Later, in 1944 an 80 Wing unit landed in Normandy a week or more after D-Day and followed the successful invasion force through Northern France into Belgium. Their mission then was to establish radio frequencies it was thought being used to guide German V Flying Bombs and to destroy the signals -- one of various efforts made at the time to counter the V missiles used against Britain and later against targets in France and Belgium.

At it peak, the wing included 2,000 personnel. It was disbanded on 24 September 1945.

== Postwar ==
No. 80 Wing RAF was reformed on 1 August 1953 and disbanded on 15 March 1957.

== See also ==
- No. 80 Wing RAAF – a joint RAAF-RAF fighter wing that saw action in the South West Pacific Area during 1943–45.
- List of Wings of the Royal Air Force
