= No. 90 (Signals) Group RAF =

Former Royal Air Force signals group

- Royal Air Force Ensign
- Active: 24 April 1946 - 3 November 1958; 1 January 1969 - 31 August 1973
- Country: United Kingdom
- Branch: Royal Air Force
- Type: Royal Air Force group
- Part of: British Air Forces of Occupation; RAF Transport Command; RAF Strike Command; RAF Maintenance Command; RAF Support Command
- Mottos: Latin: Aetherem Vincere ("Conquer the ether")

No. 90 Group (90 Gp) was a group of the Royal Air Force.

No. 26 (Signals) Group RAF and No. 60 Group RAF were amalgamated to form No. 90 (Signals) Group on 24 April 1946 under the administrative control of British Air Forces of Occupation and Transport Command. The work formerly undertaken by No. 80 Wing RAF, which was disbanded on 24 September 1945, was carried out by No. 90 Group RAF. It became an independent Group in 1951 or 1952.

It was raised in status to become RAF Signals Command on 3 November 1958, reverting to Group status on 1 January 1969 within RAF Strike Command. It was transferred to RAF Maintenance Command on 1 September 1972 and disbanded on 31 August 1973, becoming part of RAF Support Command.

444 Signals Unit

444 Signals Unit (SU) formed within 90 Group, Strike Command, with effect from 16 August 1971, and was established as a lodger unit at Stanley Fort, Hong Kong. The primary role of 444 SU was to act as a ground station for the Skynet (satellite) communications system. The Royal Air Force had received responsibility for operating the Skynet system in the late 1960s under the Rationalisation of Inter Services Telecommunications (RISTACOM) agreement. It would appear that the equipment operated by 444 SU had been located previously at RAF Bahrain (HMS Jufair).

On 1 May 1972, No. 90 (Signals) Group was transferred from RAF Strike Command to RAF Maintenance Command and as a consequence 444 SU became a Maintenance Command unit on this date. On 31 August 1973, both 90 (Signals) Group and Maintenance Command were disbanded, to be replaced on the following day by the new RAF Support Command. All their units and locations were transferred to Support Command with effect from 1 September 1973 and 444 SU therefore became a Support Command unit. This was to prove short-lived, however, for on 1 November 1973, 444 SU and the unit responsible for maintaining the Skynet ground station at RAF Gan – No. 6 Signals Unit RAF – were both transferred to the command of the Air Officer Commanding in Chief Near East Air Force (NEAF). At this time 444 SU and 6 SU formed part of the Defence Communications Network (DCN) and the DCN elements of both units came under the functional control of the Controller DCN, Ministry of Defence.

On 1 August 1975, administrative and engineering responsibility for all of the units comprising RAF Hong Kong, including 444 SU, were transferred from NEAF to RAF Strike Command – functional control of these units being retained by the Vice Chief of the Air Staff via Commander RAF Hong Kong. Subsequently, with the disbandment of HQ NEAF on 31 March 1976, control of RAF Hong Kong and its component units were transferred in total to Strike Command. On 28 March 1976, RAF Gan closed and 6 SU disbanded formally on the same date, the latter's satellite communications equipment being transferred to 444 SU.

Sources indicate that 444 SU disbanded and closed on 31 December 1977.
