= No. 17 Group RAF =

Former Royal Air Force operations group

- Royal Air Force Ensign
- Active: 1 April 1918 - 18 October 1919; 1 December 1936 - 1 September 1945
- Country: United Kingdom
- Branch: Royal Air Force
- Type: Royal Air Force group
- Role: Military aviation training
- Part of: RAF Coastal Command
- Engagements: First World War; Second World War

Commanders
- Notable commanders: Air Vice-Marshal Harry George Smart

No. 17 Group RAF was a group of the Royal Air Force which was operational in the last year of the First World War, and throughout the Second World War.

== History ==
=== First World War ===
During the First World War, No. 17 Group was formed at the start of April 1918, within No. 4 Area. It was transferred to North-Eastern Area on 8 May 1918, with Training being added to the name on 8 August 1918. On 1 October 1919, No. 20 Group was absorbed into No. 17 Group, but just over two weeks later the group was disbanded, on 18 October 1919.

=== Second World War ===
It reformed on 1 December 1936 as No. 17 (Training) Group within RAF Coastal Command, at Wykeham Hall, Lee-on-Solent. The group was responsible for all the training units allocated to RAF Coastal Command. The HQ remained at Wykeham Hall for one year before moving to RAF Lee-on-Solent on 1 December 1937. Just over twelve months later the HQ moved again, and on 24 February 1939 it relocated to Fort Grange, one of the Palmerston Forts, in Gosport. Then on 5 February 1942 HQ moved north to Scotland, relocating to the Mackenzie Hotel, in Edinburgh, the capital city of Scotland. Following the end of the Second World War it disbanded on 1 September 1945, and all No. 17 Group RAF units were transferred over to No. 18 Group RAF.

=== Structure and units ===
The following training units served as part of No. 17 Group for some time during the Second World War. RAF Coastal Command - Listed as Order of Battle on specific dates during the Second World War:

The Seaplane Training Squadron had formed on 1 October 1931 at RAF Calshot by redesignating the Seaplane Training Flight, and the Torpedo Training Unit had formed out of 'A' Torpedo Training Flight during February 1936 at RAF Gosport. During February 1937, No. 2 Anti-Aircraft Co-operation Unit was formed by the merging of No. 1 Gunnery Co-operation Flight and 'A' Flight School of Naval Co-operation. The School of General Reconnaissance was formed during April 1938 at RAF Thorney Island. In June 1939 the Torpedo Development Unit was formed at RAF Gosport by redesignating the Torpedo Development Unit of the Torpedo Development Section with RAF Gosport.

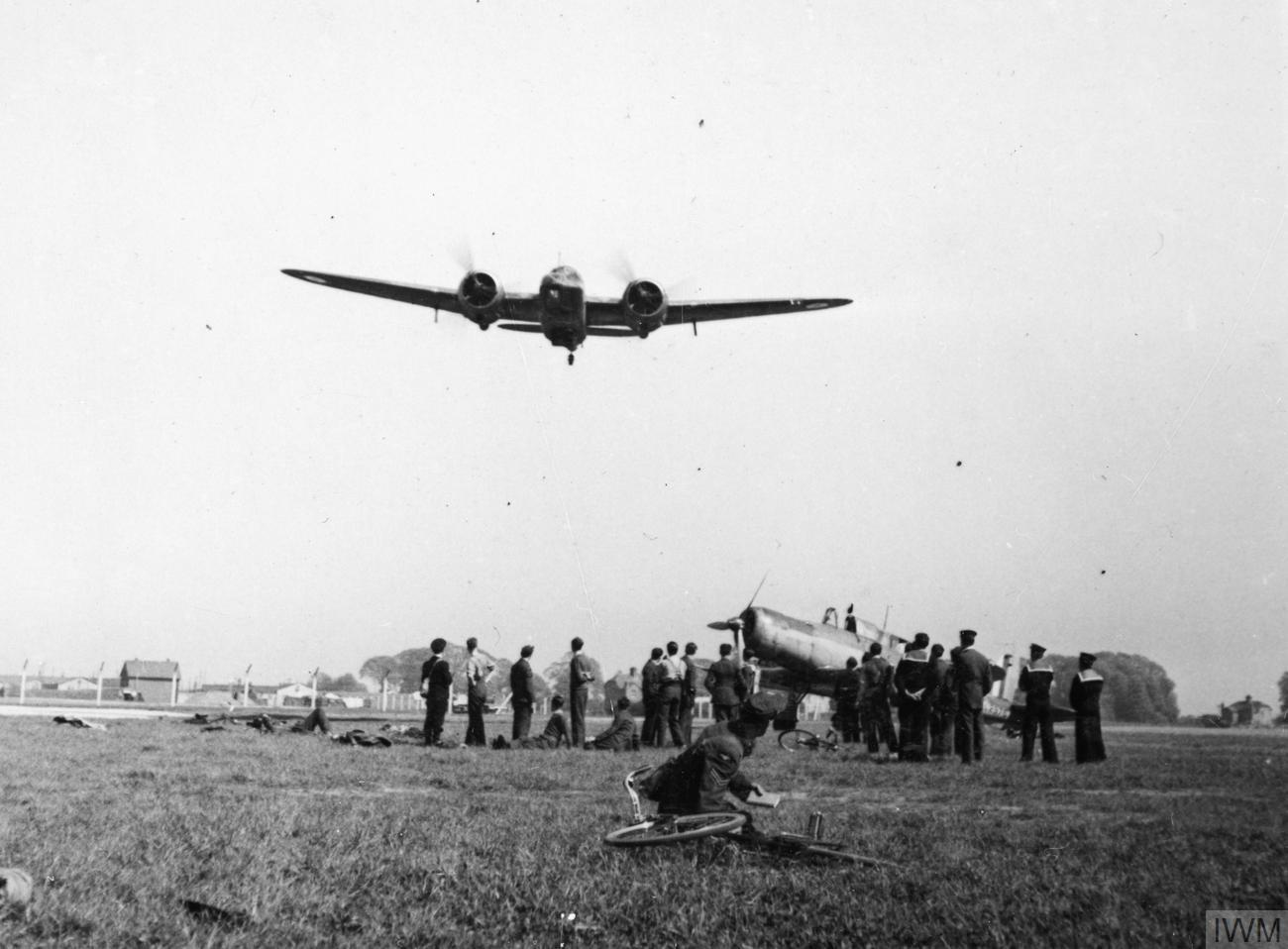
A Bristol Blenheim IV flies low over RAF Gosport observed by airman and sailors from the ground. A Blackburn Skua of the Aircraft Torpedo Development Unit is seen on the ground

Around the beginning of the Second World War, No. 17 Group was made up of a handful of units across a small number of bases.

==== Structure in Autumn 1939 ====
- No. 17 Group RAF (T), Air Officer Commanding: Air Commodore T.E.B. Howe, CBE, AFC
  - Group Headquarters: Fort Grange located in Gosport
    - RAF Gosport
      - Torpedo Training Unit RAF operated with various aircraft.
      - Torpedo Development Unit RAF operated with various aircraft.
      - No. 2 Anti-Aircraft Co-operation Unit RAF operated with various aircraft.
    - RAF Calshot
      - Seaplane Training Squadron RAF operated with various aircraft.
    - RAF Silloth
      - School of General Reconnaissance RAF operated with Avro Anson multi-role aircraft.
      - Coastal Command Landplane Pilots School RAF operated with various aircraft.

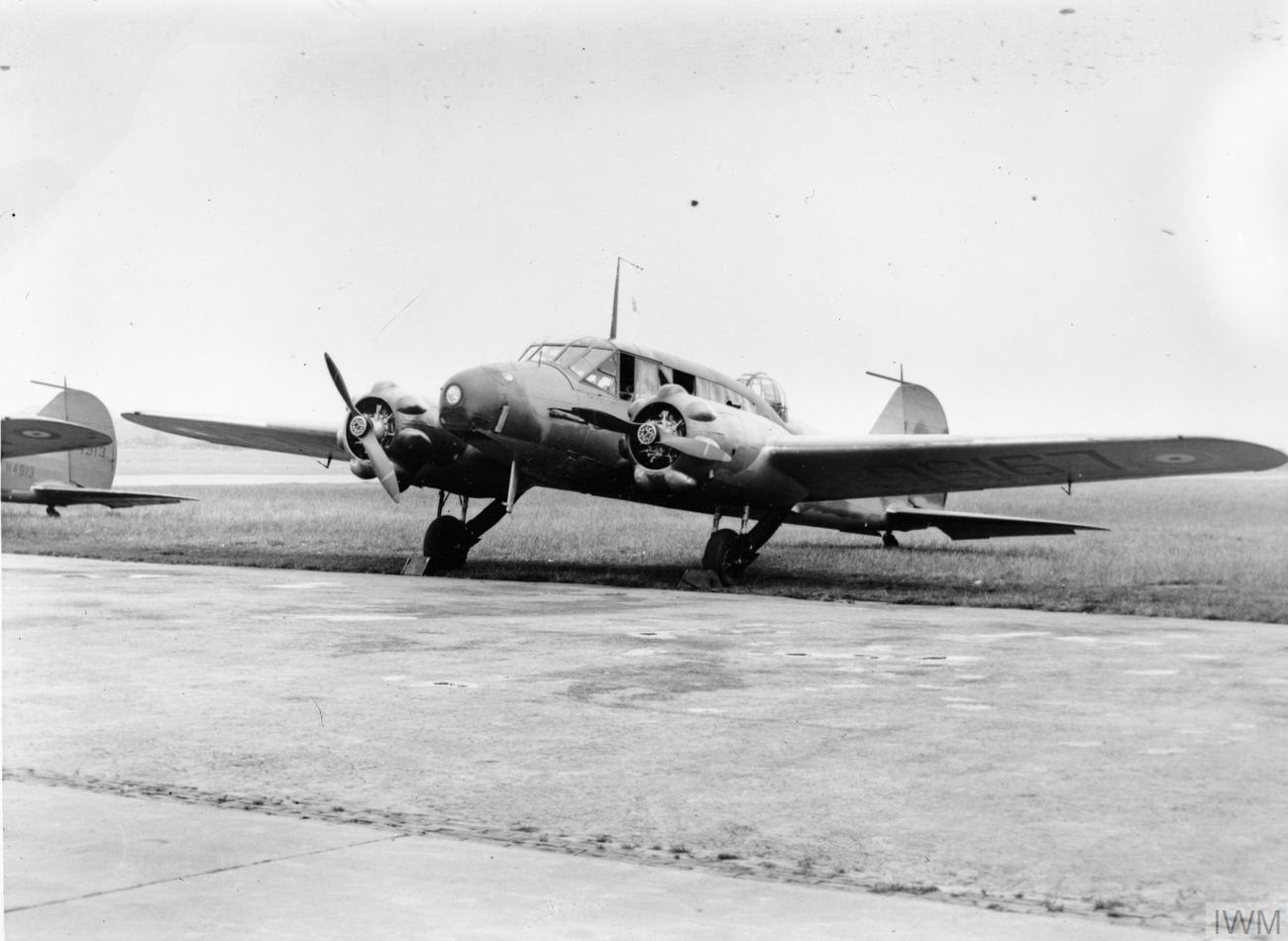
Avro Anson Mark I, L9150, of No. 1 Coast Artillery Cooperation Unit, on the ground at Gosport, Hampshire

On 1 June 1937 No. 1 Coast Artillery Co-operation Unit had formed at RAF Gosport by redesignating the Coast Artillery Co-operation Flight. Initially in No. 16 Group, by May 1941 the unit had been transferred into No. 17 Group.

The School of General Reconnaissance was redesignated No. 1 School of General Reconnaissance from 19 June 1940 at RAF Hooton Park, but around six months later the school was disbanded on 30 September at RAF Squires Gate. However, in December 1940, No. 3 School of General Reconnaissance formed at RAF Squires Gate, by redesignating an element of the existing No. 2 School of General Reconnaissance. Its primary aircraft operated was the Blackburn Botha, a British four-seat reconnaissance and torpedo bomber.

Between April 1940 and March 1941, No. 17 Group had four Operational Training Units formed, each with (Coastal) in their title, to provide aircrew training, with each unit having a specific focus such as landplane aircraft, twin engine types, flying boat, or for a specific aircraft type. Formed on 1 April 1940, at RAF Silloth, by redesignating the Coastal Command Landplane Pilots School, No. 1 (Coastal) Operational Training Unit initially specifically trained aircrews for RAF Coastal Command landplanes. This was followed by No. 2 (Coastal) Operational Training Unit, which was formed on 1 October 1940 at RAF Catfoss. Its role was training strike and twin-engined fighter aircrew and for this it was initially equipped with Bristol Blenheim, a British light bomber aircraft and Avro Anson a British twin-engine, multi-role aircraft. Almost two months afterwards No. 3 (Coastal) Operational Training Unit was formed at RAF Chivenor on 27 November 1940. It was initially tasked with training aircrew for Avro Anson, from No. 1 (Coastal) Operational Training Unit. The Flying Boat Training Squadron was formed on 2 January 1939 at RAF Calshot. It operated Supermarine Stranraer I, a British biplane flying boat, Supermarine Scapa I, a British general reconnaissance flying boat, and Short Singapore III, a British multi-engined biplane flying boat. It was disbanded and then merged with the Seaplane Training Squadron to become No. 4 (Coastal) Operational Training Unit, on 16 March 1941. Its role was to train flying boat aircrew for RAF Coastal Command.

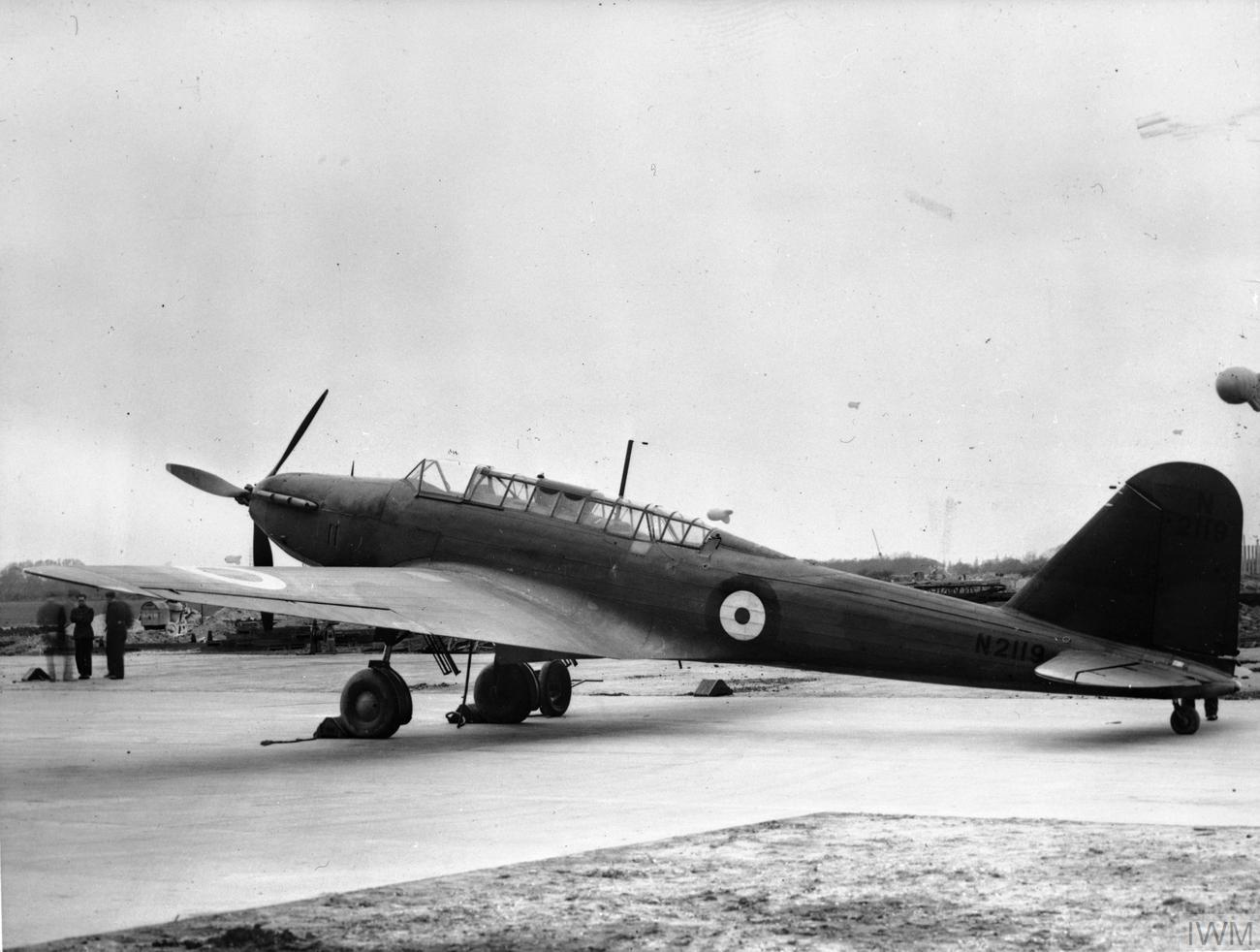
Fairey Battle, N2119, of No. 2 Anti-Aircraft Cooperation Unit, on the ground at Gosport, Hampshire

Around eighteen months of Britain into the Second World War and No. 17 Group had expanded to around ten units across nine Royal Air Force stations.

==== Structure in Spring 1941 ====
- No. 17 Group RAF (T), Air Officer Commanding: Air Commodore T.E.B. Howe, CBE, AFC
  - Group Headquarters Fort Grange located in Gosport
    - RAF Abbotsinch
      - Torpedo Training Unit RAF operated with Bristol Beaufort torpedo bomber
    - RAF Catfoss
      - No. 2 (Coastal) Operational Training Unit RAF aircrew training for Bristol Blenheim light bomber and used Avro Anson multi-role aircraft
    - RAF Chivenor
      - No. 3 (Coastal) Operational Training Unit RAF aircrew training for twin engine aircraft with various aircraft
    - RAF Detling
      - No. 1 Coast Artillery Co-operation Unit RAF operated with Bristol Blenheim light bomber
    - RAF Gosport
      - Torpedo Development Unit RAF operated with various aircraft
      - No. 2 Anti-Aircraft Co-operation Unit RAF operated with various aircraft
    - RAF Greenock
      - Maintenance Unit for Flying Boats
    - RAF Silloth
      - No. 1 (Coastal) Operational Training Unit RAF operated with various aircraft
    - RAF Squires Gate
      - No. 3 School of General Reconnaissance RAF operated with Blackburn Botha reconnaissance and torpedo bomber
    - RAF Stranraer
      - No. 4 (Coastal) Operational Training Unit RAF operated with various aircraft

During 1941 Air Commodore A.W. Mylne took command of No. 17 Group, with Air Commodore T.E.B. Howe retiring. Then on 17 November 1941, Air Commodore H. G. Smart, CBE, DFC, AFC, was appointed Air Officer Commanding of No. 17 Group. Air Commodore Mylne moved to HQ Balloon Command.

No. 6 (Coastal) Operational Training Unit reformed, in No 17 Group, during July 1941 but was now located at RAF Thornaby. Initially equipped with Lockheed Hudson, an American light bomber and coastal reconnaissance aircraft, the units task was to provide aircrew training in general reconnaissance. Then on 29 July 1941, the aircrew training provided by No. 3 (Coastal) Operational Training Unit for Armstrong Whitworth Whitley, a British medium bomber aircraft, and Vickers Wellington, a British twin-engined, long-range medium bomber aircraft, moved to RAF Cranwell, as a lodger unit there. No. 5 (Coastal) Operational Training Unit reformed at RAF Chivenor on 1 August 1941, also within No. 17 Group, taking over the Bristol Beaufort aircrew training section from No. 3 (Coastal) Operational Training Unit. Along with Bristol Beaufort, the unit also operated with Avro Anson and Airspeed Oxford, a British twin-engine monoplane trainer aircraft. January 1942 saw the formation of No. 1441 (Combined Operations Development) Flight at RAF Abbotsinch, under No. 17 Group, equipped with various aircraft types.

On 5 February 1942 No. 17 Group HQ moved north to Scotland, relocating from Gosport to Edinburgh, it was situated at the Mackenzie Hotel, and by late spring in 1942, the group used nine Royal Air Force stations and operated with eleven units.

==== Structure in Spring 1942 ====
- No. 17 Group RAF (T), Air Officer Commanding: Air Commodore H. G. Smart, CBE, DFC, AFC,
  - Group Headquarters Mackenzie Hotel located in Edinburgh
    - RAF Abbotsinch
      - Torpedo Training Unit RAF operated with Bristol Beaufighter multi-role aircraft
      - No. 1441 (Combined Operations Development) Flight RAF operated with Westland Lysander army co-operation and liaison aircraft and Avro Anson multi-role aircraft
    - RAF Catfoss
      - No. 2 (Coastal) Operational Training Unit RAF aircrew training for Bristol Blenheim light bomber and Bristol Beaufighter multi-role aircraft
    - RAF Chivenor
      - No. 5 (Coastal) Operational Training Unit RAF aircrew training for Bristol Beaufort torpedo bomber, operated with various aircraft
    - RAF Cranwell
      - No. 3 (Coastal) Operational Training Unit RAF aircrew training for twin engine aircraft with Armstrong Whitworth Whitley medium bomber and Vickers Wellington long-range medium bomber
    - RAF Gosport
      - Torpedo Development Unit RAF operated with various aircraft.
      - No. 2 Anti-Aircraft Co-operation Unit RAF operated with various aircraft
    - RAF Invergordon
      - No. 4 (Coastal) Operational Training Unit RAF operated with various flying boat and amphibious aircraft.
    - RAF Silloth
      - No. 1 (Coastal) Operational Training Unit RAF RAF Coastal Command landplane aircrew training with various aircraft
    - RAF Squires Gate
      - No. 3 School of General Reconnaissance RAF operated with Blackburn Botha reconnaissance and torpedo bomber
    - RAF Thornaby
      - No. 6 (Coastal) Operational Training Unit RAF operated with Lockheed Hudson light bomber and coastal reconnaissance aircraft

The Torpedo Training Unit remained at RAF Abbotsinch until November 1942, when it then moved to RAF Turnberry, and was shortly afterwards redesignated as No. 1 Torpedo Training Unit, from 1 January 1943. A second training unit for the use of torpedo bomber aircraft was established when No. 2 Torpedo Training Unit was formed within No. 17 Group, on 19 December 1942 at RAF Castle Kennedy.

Consolidated pilot training in photographic reconnaissance was needed within RAF Coastal Command and No 8 (Coastal) Operational Training Unit was formed at RAF Fraserburgh on 18 May 1942, within No 17 Group, by merging 'K' (Photographic Reconnaissance Advanced Training) Flight of No. 1 Photographic Reconnaissance Unit RAF and the Photographic Reconnaissance Conversion Flight of No. 3 School of General Reconnaissance, it was tasked with training Supermarine Spitfire pilots in Photographic Reconnaissance. The unit then moved to RAF Dyce in early 1943, relocating from RAF Fraserburgh, and as well as Supermarine Spitfire aircraft, it also operated de Havilland Mosquito, a British twin-engined, multirole combat aircraft, and various other aircraft types, in photographic reconnaissance instruction. No. 9 (Coastal) Operational Training Unit RAF was formed in June 1942 at RAF Aldergrove, and its role was to train up long range fighter aircrew. It was initially equipped with Bristol Beaufighter, a British multi-role aircraft, Bristol Beaufort, a British twin-engined torpedo bomber, and Airspeed Oxford, a twin-engine monoplane trainer aircraft. The training unit relocated to RAF Crosby-on-Eden in September 1942.

There was a need for a further training unit for flying boat and amphibious aircraft and No. 131 (Coastal) Operational Training Unit RAF was formed in July 1942 at RAF Killadeas. The unit was tasked with training aircrew to use Consolidated Catalina. When formed it started out in No. 15 Group RAF, but in December 1942 the unit transferred to No. 17 Group RAF. No. 132 (Coastal) Operational Training Unit formed on 24 November 1942 at RAF East Fortune by redesignating No. 60 Operational Training Unit RAF. It was initially equipped with Bristol Blenheim and Bristol Beaufighter aircraft. The unit was tasked with pilot training for long range fighter and strike aircraft.

No. 302 Ferry Training Unit formed on 30 September 1942 at RAF Loch Erne, primarily operating with Consolidated Catalina amphibious aircraft and then moved to RAF Stranraer roughly three months later, in December 1942. No. 304 Ferry Training Unit was formed at RAF Port Ellen and No. 306 Ferry Training Unit was formed at RAF Templeton, both on 31 December 1942. The former was equipped with Armstrong Whitworth Albemarle twin-engine transport aircraft, Bristol Blenheim and de Havilland Mosquito, and the latter was equipped with Bristol Beaufort I & IIA, and Bristol Beaufighter X aircraft. In January 1943 it began the training and preparation of aircrew for long distance ferry flights. On 23 March 1943 No. 1 (Coastal) Operational Training Unit moved to RAF Thornaby and the unit also took on training aircrew for Consolidated Liberator, an American heavy bomber, Boeing Fortress an American four-engined heavy bomber, and Handley Page Halifax a British four-engined heavy bomber.

By mid spring of 1943, No. 17 Group had operations from seventeen Royal Air Force stations and provided various training for aircrew across eighteen units.

==== Structure in Spring 1943 ====
- No. 17 Group RAF (T), Air Officer Commanding: Air Vice-Marshal H. G. Smart, CBE, DFC, AFC,
  - Group Headquarters Mackenzie Hotel located in Edinburgh
    - RAF Alness
      - No. 4 (Coastal) Operational Training Unit RAF operated with Short Sunderland flying boat patrol bomber and Consolidated Catalina flying boat and amphibious aircraft
    - RAF Castle Kennedy
      - No. 2 Torpedo Training Unit RAF operated with Bristol Beaufort torpedo bomber and Bristol Beaufighter multi-role aircraft
    - RAF Catfoss
      - No. 2 (Coastal) Operational Training Unit RAF aircrew training for Bristol Blenheim light bomber and Bristol Beaufighter multi-role aircraft
    - RAF Cranwell
      - No. 3 (Coastal) Operational Training Unit RAF aircrew training for twin engine aircraft with Armstrong Whitworth Whitley medium bomber and Vickers Wellington long-range medium bomber
    - RAF Crosby-on-Eden
      - No. 9 (Coastal) Operational Training Unit RAF aircrew training for Bristol Beaufort torpedo bomber, Airspeed Oxford training aircraft and Bristol Beaufighter multi-role aircraft
    - RAF Dyce
      - No. 8 (Coastal) Operational Training Unit RAF aircrew training for photo reconnaissance with de Havilland Mosquito multi-role combat aircraft
      - No. 1509 (Beam Approach Training) Flight RAF operated with Airspeed Oxford training aircraft
    - RAF East Fortune
      - No. 132 (Coastal) Operational Training Unit RAF operated with Bristol Beaufighter multi-role aircraft
    - RAF Killadeas
      - No. 131 (Coastal) Operational Training Unit RAF operated with Consolidated Catalina flying boat and amphibious aircraft
    - RAF Limavady
      - No. 7 (Coastal) Operational Training Unit RAF operated with Vickers Wellington long-range medium bomber
    - RAF Long Kesh
      - No. 5 (Coastal) Operational Training Unit RAF aircrew training, operated with Bristol Beaufort torpedo bomber and Handley Page Hampden medium bomber
    - RAF Port Ellen
      - No. 304 Ferry Training Unit RAF operated with Bristol Beaufighter multi-role aircraft
    - RAF Silloth
      - No. 6 (Coastal) Operational Training Unit RAF operated with Lockheed Hudson light bomber and coastal reconnaissance aircraft
    - RAF Squires Gate
      - No. 3 School of General Reconnaissance RAF operated with Blackburn Botha reconnaissance and torpedo bomber
    - RAF Stranraer
      - No. 302 Ferry Training Unit RAF operated with Consolidated Catalina flying boat and amphibious aircraft
    - RAF Templeton
      - No. 306 Ferry Training Unit RAF operated with Bristol Beaufort torpedo bomber
    - RAF Thornaby
      - No. 1 (Coastal) Operational Training Unit RAF operated with Lockheed Hudson light bomber and coastal reconnaissance aircraft, Avro Anson multi-role aircraft and Airspeed Oxford training aircraft
    - RAF Turnberry
      - No. 1 Torpedo Training Unit RAF operated with Vickers Wellington long-range medium bomber and Handley Page Hampden medium bomber

It was during August 1943 when No. 17 Group's output reached its highest level. 1,007 aircraft were utilised to train 238 aircrew within that period. During the entirety of 1943, No.17 Group saw 255,800 training hours completed, resulting in 11,482 men, of 1,863 aircrew, trained up across 14 different aircraft types, for the year. However, needs were changing and with the reduction of aircrew required for the Lockheed Hudson, on 19 October No. 1 (Coastal) Operational Training Unit was disbanded at RAF Thornaby, and the heavy bomber courses for Handley Page Halifax and Boeing Fortress were taken over by No. 1674 Heavy Conversion Unit RAF at RAF Aldergrove, which had not long formed, on 10 October 1943.

1944 saw a change of requirements, and along with the formation of some specialist training units, meant some older existing units ended. No. 3 (Coastal) Operational Training Unit was disbanded on 4 January 1944 at RAF Haverfordwest and absorbed by No. 6 Operational Training Unit, No. 2 (Coastal) Operational Training Unit disbanded on 15 February 1944 at RAF Catfoss, the demand for Bristol Beaufighter aircrew training had reduced, and No. 7 (C) OTU was disbanded on 16 May 1944 at RAF Haverfordwest and was immediately redesignated No. 4 Refresher Flying Unit RAF.

With the aircrew training becoming more specialised the syllabuses increased to 38 in 1944, from 26 during 1943. The length of each course and the flying hours required also increased. Both Anti-submarine warfare training and General Reconnaissance training were split into two parts, conversion to type and then operation.

By the summer of 1944 the group conducted operations from ten Royal Air Force stations with thirteen units.

==== Structure in Summer 1944 ====
- No. 17 Group RAF (T), Air Officer Commanding: Air Vice-Marshal H. G. Smart, CBE, DFC, AFC,
  - Group Headquarters Mackenzie Hotel located in Edinburgh
    - RAF Aldergrove
      - No. 4 (Coastal) Operational Training Unit RAF operated with Short Sunderland flying boat patrol bomber
      - No. 1674 Heavy Conversion Unit RAF operated with Consolidated Liberator heavy bomber
    - RAF Crosby-on-Eden
      - No. 9 (Coastal) Operational Training Unit RAF aircrew training for Bristol Beaufort torpedo bomber and Bristol Beaufighter multi-role aircraft
      - No. 1674 Heavy Conversion Unit RAF (det) operated with Handley Page Halifax heavy bomber
    - RAF East Fortune
      - No. 132 (Coastal) Operational Training Unit RAF operated with Bristol Beaufighter multi-role aircraft, Bristol Beaufort torpedo bomber and de Havilland Mosquito multi-role combat aircraft
    - RAF Haverfordwest
      - No. 4 Refresher Flying Unit RAF operated with Vickers Wellington long-range medium bomber
    - RAF Killadeas
      - No. 131 (Coastal) Operational Training Unit RAF operated with Consolidated Catalina flying boat and amphibious aircraft
      - No. 12 Flying Instructors School RAF operated with Vickers Wellington long-range medium bomber, Bristol Beaufort torpedo bomber and de Havilland Mosquito multi-role combat aircraft
    - RAF Oban
      - No. 302 Ferry Training Unit RAF operated with Consolidated Catalina flying boat and amphibious aircraft and Short Sunderland flying boat patrol bomber
    - RAF Silloth
      - No. 6 (Coastal) Operational Training Unit RAF operated with Vickers Wellington long-range medium bomber
    - RAF Squires Gate
      - No. 3 School of General Reconnaissance RAF operated with Avro Anson multi-role aircraft
    - RAF Turnberry
      - No. 5 (Coastal) Operational Training Unit RAF operated with Vickers Warwick maritime reconnaissance, air-sea rescue and transport aircraft, Lockheed Ventura maritime patrol aircraft, Bristol Beaufighter multi-role aircraft and Lockheed Hudson light bomber and coastal reconnaissance aircraft
    - RAF Turnhouse
      - No. 17 Group Communication Flight RAF operated with various aircraft

During the Autumn and Winter of 1944 through to Spring 1945, more unit reductions took place. No. 9 (Coastal) Operational Training Unit disbanded on 11 August 1944 at RAF Crosby-on-Eden, and was absorbed by No. 109 (Transport) Operational Training Unit RAF, with its aircrew training for its overseas obligation moving to No. 79 Operational Training Unit RAF. No. 1674 Heavy Conversion Unit disbanded its Boeing Fortress training during September 1944, and No. 4 Refresher Flying Unit disbanded at RAF Mullaghmore on 5 October 1944. No 131 (C) OTUs Short Sunderland flying boat were transferred to No 4 (C) OTU on 13 February 1945, and with the Consolidated Catalina being withdrawn from RAF service, the unit was disbanded on 28 June 1945. By mid summer 1945, No. 17 Group was down to operating from seven Royal Air Force stations with nine units.

==== Structure in Summer 1945 ====
- No. 17 Group RAF (T), Air Officer Commanding: Air Vice-Marshal H. G. Smart, CBE, DFC, AFC,
  - Group Headquarters Mackenzie Hotel located in Edinburgh
    - RAF Aldergrove
      - No. 1674 Heavy Conversion Unit RAF operated with Consolidated Liberator heavy bomber and Handley Page Halifax heavy bomber
    - RAF Alness
      - No. 4 (Coastal) Operational Training Unit RAF operated with Short Sunderland flying boat patrol bomber
      - No. 302 Ferry Training Unit RAF operated with Consolidated Catalina flying boat and amphibious aircraft, and Short Sunderland flying boat patrol bomber
    - RAF East Fortune
      - No. 132 (Coastal) Operational Training Unit RAF operated with Bristol Beaufighter multi-role aircraft, Bristol Beaufort torpedo bomber and de Havilland Mosquito multi-role combat aircraft
    - RAF Silloth
      - No. 6 (Coastal) Operational Training Unit RAF operated with Vickers Wellington long-range medium bomber
    - RAF Squires Gate
      - No. 3 School of General Reconnaissance RAF operated with Avro Anson multi-role aircraft
      - No. 1510 (BABS) Flight RAF operated with Avro Anson multi-role aircraft
    - RAF Turnberry
      - No. 5 (Coastal) Operational Training Unit RAF operated with Vickers Warwick maritime reconnaissance, air-sea rescue and transport aircraft, Bristol Beaufighter multi-role aircraft, and Lockheed Hudson light bomber and coastal reconnaissance aircraft
    - RAF Turnhouse
      - No. 17 Group Communication Flight RAF operated with various aircraft

=== 17 Group Communications Flight ===
No. 17 Group Communications Flight RAF formed at RAF Gosport during August 1938. It operated various types and marks of aircraft:

- Avro Tutor a two-seat British biplane basic trainer
- Miles Magister a two-seat monoplane basic trainer
- Miles Mentor a British single-engined three-seat monoplane training and communications aircraft
- Airspeed Envoy a twin-engined light transport aircraft
- Parnall Heck a British four-seat cabin monoplane
- Percival Proctor III a British radio trainer and communications aircraft
- Avro Anson I a British twin-engine, multi-role aircraft

The flight disbanded at RAF Turnhouse on 18 September 1945.

=== Disbandment ===
No. 17 Group disbanded on 1 September 1945. The requirements for needing the group no longer existed. The active units were moved into No. 18 Group RAF as a temporary measure, until their futures were resolved.

== Air Officer Commanding ==
Note: The ranks shown are the ranks held at the time of holding the appointment of Air Officer Commanding, No. 17 Group Royal Air Force.

No. 17 Group commanding officers
Rank	name	from
	unknown	April 1918
Disbanded		October 1919
Group Captain	W. C. Hicks	January 1937
Air Commodore	Charles Breese	March 1937
Air Commodore	Thomas Howe	November 1938
Air Commodore	Athol Mylne	1941
Air Commodore	Harry George Smart	November 1941

== See also ==
- List of Royal Air Force groups
- RAF Coastal Command
- RAF Coastal Command during World War II
- RAF Coastal Command order of battle during World War II
