= No. 5 (Coastal) Operational Training Unit RAF =

Former Royal Air Force Coastal Command Operational Training Unit

No. 5 (Coastal) Operational Training Unit
- Active: 1 August 1941 - 1 August 1945
- Disbanded: 1 August 1945
- Country: United Kingdom
- Branch: Royal Air Force
- Type: Operational Training Unit
- Role: Aircrew Training
- Part of: RAF Coastal Command; *No. 17 Group RAF

No. 5 (Coastal) Operational Training Unit RAF (5 (C)OTU), was a training unit of the Royal Air Force, within No. 17 Group RAF, which was part of RAF Coastal Command. The unit was established during August 1941 and disbanded during August 1945.

== History ==
No. 5 (Coastal) Operational Training Unit RAF formed on 1 August 1941 at RAF Chivenor, located on the northern shore of the River Taw estuary, on the north coast of Devon, England. Initially it was to have formed at RAF Turnberry and to be tasked with training aircrew on Bristol Beaufort, a British twin-engined torpedo bomber, but was forced to form at RAF Chivenor due to the time taken to complete RAF Turnberry. The unit assumed the responsibility for the Bristol Beaufort training from No. 3 (Coastal) Operational Training Unit RAF, but was also equipped with Airspeed Oxford, a British twin-engine monoplane trainer aircraft, and Avro Anson, a British twin-engine, multi-role aircraft.

On 3 May 1942, No. 5 (Coastal) Operational Training Unit moved to RAF Turnberry, upon the airfield's eventual completion. The training unit ran its courses out of the air station for the next eight months, before moving out on 29 December 1942. RAF Coastal Command had taken control of RAF Long Kesh, located at Maze, Lisburn, in Northern Ireland, in December 1942, and by the end of the month, No. 5 (C) OTU had moved in. RAF Maghaberry, located north of Maghaberry, in County Antrim, Northern Ireland, was used as a satellite station, between February and September 1943. It added Handley Page Hampden, a British twin-engine medium bomber, to its inventory, operating alongside the Bristol Beaufort and Avro Anson. Its two primary tasks were to train aircrew in bombing and torpedo attacks, along with a type conversion course. In February 1943, the Avro Anson training flight was transferred to No. 10 Radio School RAF, and by the end of the year the unit had then taken on, and provided training for, Lockheed Hudson, an American light bomber and coastal reconnaissance aircraft, and Lockheed Ventura, an American twin-engine medium bomber and patrol bomber. There was a reduction over time for the need for Handley Page Hampden and Bristol Beaufort aircrew training, and then in February 1944 the training unit moved out and back to Scotland.

No 5 (Coastal) Operational Training Unit arrived back at RAF Turnberry on 15 February 1944. On 15 May 1944, the Air Sea Rescue Training Unit RAF disbanded at RAF Thornaby, but was absorbed by No. 5 (C) OTU, then on 22 May 1944, No. 1 Torpedo Training Unit RAF, which was based at RAF Thornaby, disbanded and was also absorbed by the OTU. At this point the unit was operating with Bristol Beaufighter, Lockheed Ventura, Lockheed Hudson, Vickers Warwick, a British twin-engined multi-purpose aircraft, Airspeed Oxford and Miles Martinet, a target tug aircraft, and later on it also added Vickers Wellington, a British twin-engined, long-range medium bomber, to its inventory. On 1 August 1945, No 5 (Coastal) Operational Training Unit disbanded at RAF Turnberry, and the Vickers Warwick activity was transferred to No. 6 Operational Training Unit RAF.

== Aircraft operated ==
No. 5 (Coastal) Operational Training Unit was equipped with numerous types and variants of aircraft:

- Avro Anson I twin-engine, multi-role aircraft
- Fairey Battle V single-engine light bomber
- Bristol Blenheim IV twin-engine light bomber
- Westland Lysander II & TT.IIIA army co-operation and liaison aircraft
- Handley Page Hampden I twin-engine medium bomber
- Handley Page Hereford I twin-engine medium bomber
- Lockheed Hudson I & V light bomber and coastal reconnaissance aircraft
- Miles Mentor single-engined three-seat monoplane training and communications aircraft
- de Havilland Moth Minor two-seat tourer/trainer aircraft
- de Havilland Tiger Moth II biplane primary trainer aircraft
- Bristol Beaufort I & II twin-engined torpedo bomber
- Airspeed Oxford I, II twin-engine monoplane trainer aircraft
- Lockheed Ventura I, II, V twin-engine medium bomber and patrol bomber
- Bristol Beaufighter VI twin-engine multi-role aircraft
- Vickers Warwick I twin-engine maritime reconnaissance, air-sea rescue and transport aircraft
- Hawker Hurricane I & IIC single-seat fighter aircraft
- Miles Martinet I target tug aircraft
- Vickers Wellington XIII twin-engined, long-range medium bomber

== Airfields used ==
No. 5 (Coastal) Operational Training Unit used three Royal Air Force stations throughout its existence:

- RAF Chivenor from Aug 1941.
- RAF Turnberry from May 1942 until December 1942.
- RAF Long Kesh from December 1942 until February 1944.
- RAF Turnberry from February 1944 until August 1945

== See also ==
- List of Royal Air Force Operational Training Units
