= No. 3 (Coastal) Operational Training Unit RAF =

Former Royal Air Force training unit

No. 3 (Coastal) Operational Training Unit
- Active: 27 November 1940 - 4 January 1944
- Country: United Kingdom
- Branch: Royal Air Force
- Type: Operational Training Unit
- Role: Aircrew Training
- Part of: RAF Coastal Command; *No. 17 Group RAF

No. 3 (Coastal) Operational Training Unit RAF (3 (C)OTU), was a training unit of the Royal Air Force, within No. 17 Group RAF, which was part of RAF Coastal Command. The unit started operating from late 1940 and disbanded at the start of 1944, being absorbed into No. 6 OTU.

== History ==
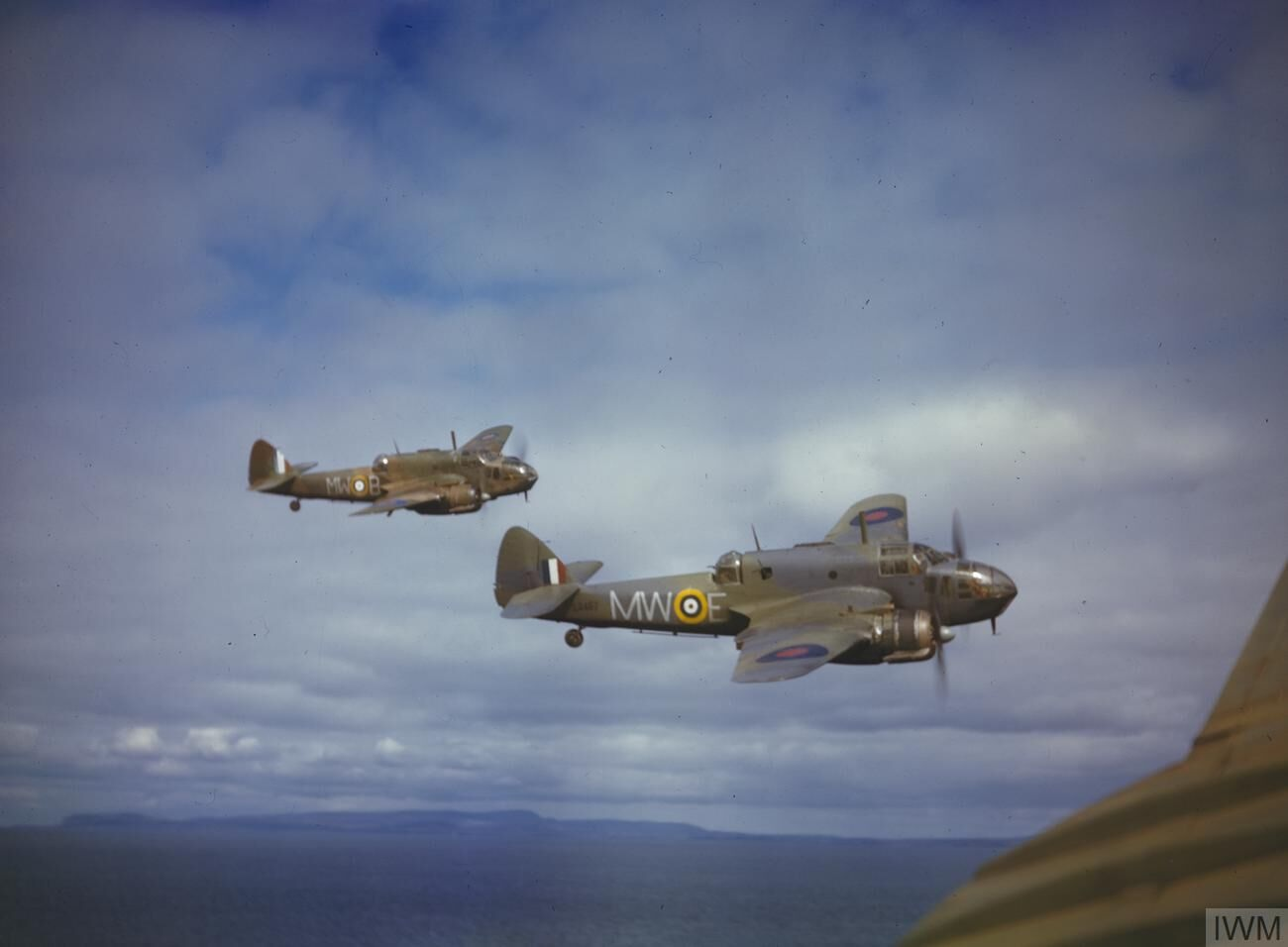
Two Bristol Beaufort (N1173/`MW-E' and AW242/`MW-B') of 217 Squadron, examples of those used by No. 3 (C) OTU

No. 3 (Coastal) Operational Training Unit RAF was formed at RAF Chivenor on 27 November 1940. It was tasked with training aircrew for Avro Anson, a British twin-engine, multi-role aircraft, and Bristol Beaufort, a British twin-engined torpedo bomber aircraft, from No. 1 (C) OTU. Aircrew training for Bristol Beaufort aircraft had been intended for No. 5 (C) OTU, and No. 3 (C) OTU was initially designated for training aircrew for Vickers Wellington, a British twin-engined, long-range medium bomber, and Armstrong Whitworth Whitley, a British medium bomber aircraft, however, slow progress with the construction of new airfields meant the Vickers Wellington and Armstrong Whitworth Whitley aircrew training went to RAF Kinloss, and later RAF Silloth, with the Bristol Beaufort aircrew training remaining at RAF Chivenor.

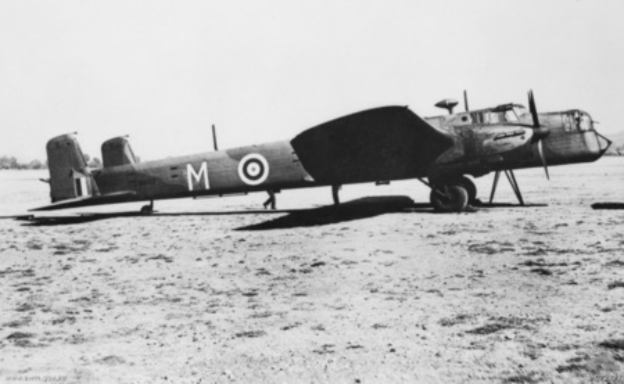
A Royal Air Force Coastal Command Armstrong Whitworth Whitley Mk.VII

On 29 July 1941 the aircrew training for the Whitley and Wellington aircraft moved to RAF Cranwell as a lodger unit, and the Bristol Beaufort aircrew training section became No. 5 Operational Training Unit RAF (5 OTU), when it re-formed at RAF Chivenor on 1 August 1941.

No. 3 (C) OTU was the first unit to be officially based at RAF Haverfordwest. Initially, on the 30 November 1942, four of its Armstrong Whitworth Whitley aircraft, along with ground crew, moved in from RAF Cranwell. Its role was to provide aircrew with reconnaissance training and by June 1943 its full complement of aircraft had arrived. Around the end of April 1943, aircrew training for Armstrong Whitworth Whitley had ended and the unit reorganised its Flights. The Vickers Wellington conversion training was designated ‘A’ Flight, with the two Operational Training flights ‘B’ Flight and ‘D’ Flight. ‘C’ Flight was for the Avro Anson aircrew training.

No 3 (C) OTU's Armstrong Whitworth Whitley aircraft were all eventually withdrawn, being replaced with more Vickers Wellington aircraft. Lack of space at RAF Haverfordwest, meant 'O' Flight operated out of RAF Haverfordwest’s satellite airfield, RAF Templeton. 'O' Flight of was equipped with fourteen Avro Anson I aircraft, and was tasked with the training of aircrew for general reconnaissance and particularly the use of Leigh Lights. This was successfully used against Kriegsmarine submarines by RAF Coastal Command. The flight left RAF Templeton in December 1943, moving to RAF St Athan where it was renamed No. 12 Radio School RAF.

The unit was disbanded on 4 January 1944 at RAF Haverfordwest and absorbed by No. 6 Operational Training Unit RAF (6 OTU).

== Aircraft operated ==
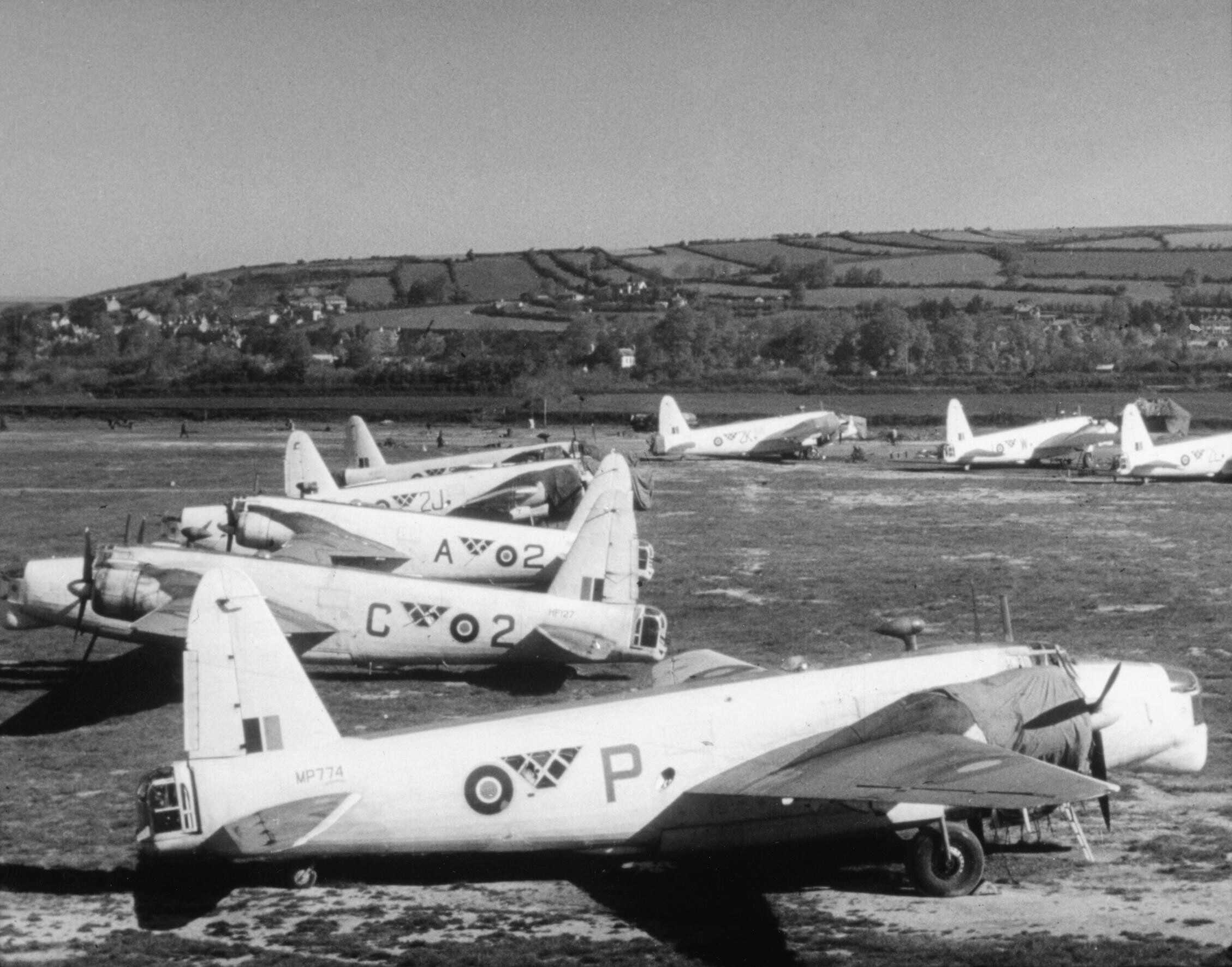
Vickers Wellington GR Mark XIVs at RAF Chivenor, examples of those used by No. 3 (C) OTU

No. 3 (Coastal) Operational Training Unit was equipped with numerous types and variants of aircraft:

- Bristol Blenheim I, IV
- Westland Lysander I, II, III, IIIA
- Avro Anson I
- Fairey Battle
- Airspeed Oxford II
- Armstrong Whitworth Whitley V, VII
- Bristol Beaufort I
- de Havilland Tiger Moth II
- Miles Magister
- Handley Page Hampden I
- Bristol Beaufighter I
- Vickers Wellington I, IA, IC, III, VIII, X, XI, XII, XIII, XIV
- Miles Martinet I

== Officer Commanding ==
Note: The ranks shown are the ranks held at the time of holding the appointment of commanding officer, No. 3 (Coastal) Operational Training Unit RAF.

No. 3 (C) OTU commanding officers
Rank	name	from
Wing Commander	J B M Wallis	30 July 1941
Wing Commander	T B Cooper	17 February 1942
Wing Commander	M G L Foster (reverted to Chief Instructor on move to RAF Haverfordwest)	29 May 1942
Group Captain	W M M Hurley (also Officer Commanding, RAF Haverfordwest)	30 June 1943

== Airfields used ==
The main airfield for the unit was RAF Chivenor however a number of different airfields were also used.

- RAF Chivenor.
- RAF Skellingthorpe.
- RAF Bottesford.
- RAF Wellingore.
- RAF Langham.
- RAF Squires Gate.
- RAF Barkston Heath.
- RAF Steeple Morden.
- RAF Templeton.
- RAF Haverfordwest.

== See also ==
- List of conversion units of the Royal Air Force
