= No. 2 (Coastal) Operational Training Unit RAF =

Former Royal Air Force Coastal Command Operational Training Unit

No. 2 (Coastal) Operational Training Unit
- Active: 1 October 1940-15 February 1944
- Disbanded: 15 February 1944
- Country: United Kingdom
- Branch: Royal Air Force
- Type: Operational Training Unit
- Role: Aircrew Training
- Part of: RAF Coastal Command; *No. 17 Group RAF

Insignia
- Identification markings: ZR Blenheim

No. 2 (Coastal) Operational Training Unit RAF (2 (C)OTU), was a training unit of the Royal Air Force, within No. 17 Group RAF, which was part of RAF Coastal Command. The unit started operating from late 1940 and disbanded during early 1944.

== History ==
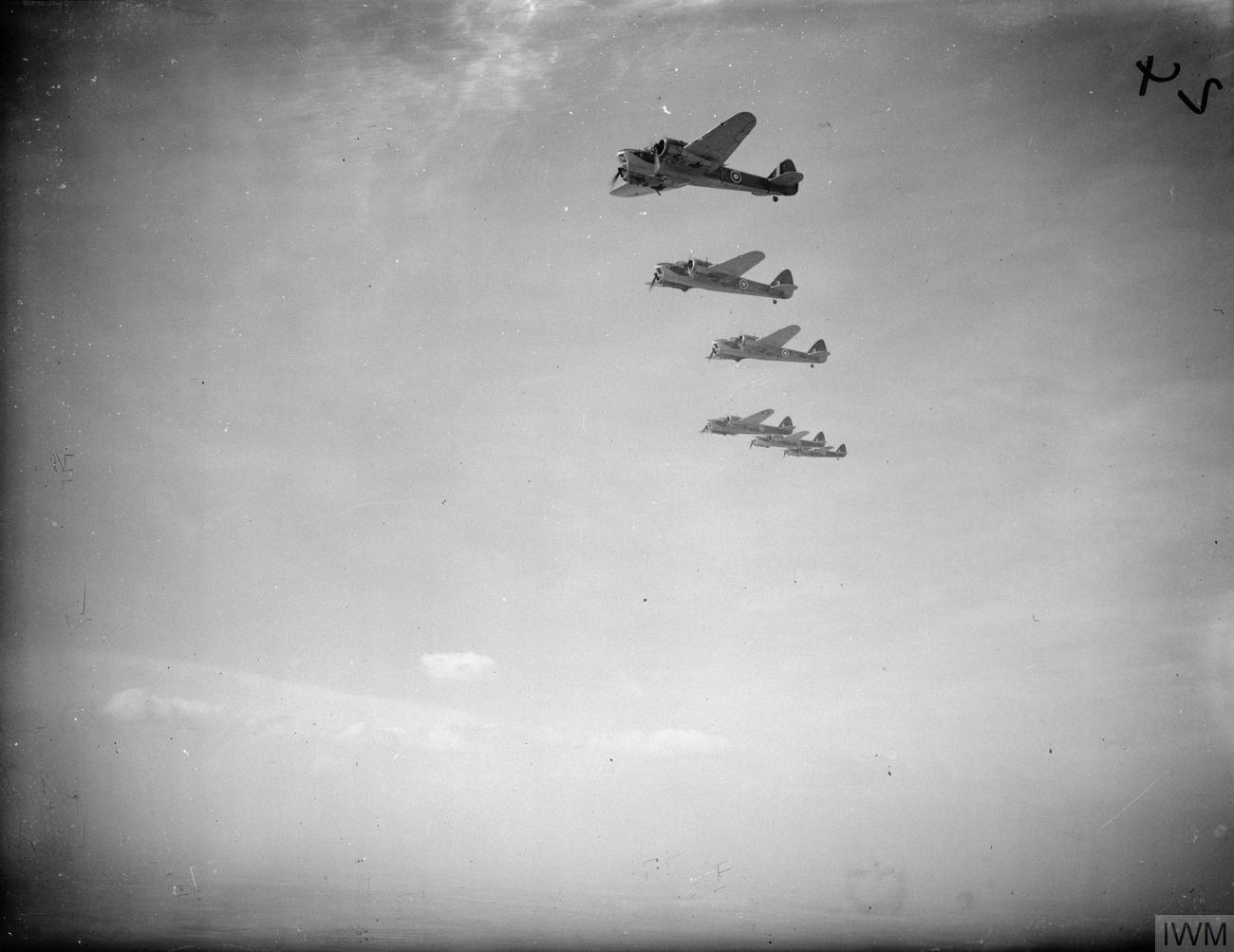
Six Bristol Blenheim Mark IVFs of No. 2 (Coastal) Operational Training Unit based at Catfoss, Yorkshire flying in starboard echelon formation

No. 2 (Coastal) Operational Training Unit RAF was formed on 1 October 1940 at RAF Catfoss. Its role was training strike and twin-engined fighter aircrew. The unit was initially equipped with Bristol Blenheim, a British light bomber aircraft and Avro Anson a British twin-engine, multi-role aircraft, before these were eventually replaced by Bristol Beaufighter a British multi-role aircraft, in 1942.

Other airfields including RAF Driffield, RAF Sherburn-in-Elmet, RAF Hutton Cranswick and RAF Lissett were all occasionally used as relief landing grounds during training sorties. Aircrew were not only trained for squadrons operating within the European theatre, but also for squadrons operating in both the Middle East theatre and the Far East theatre.

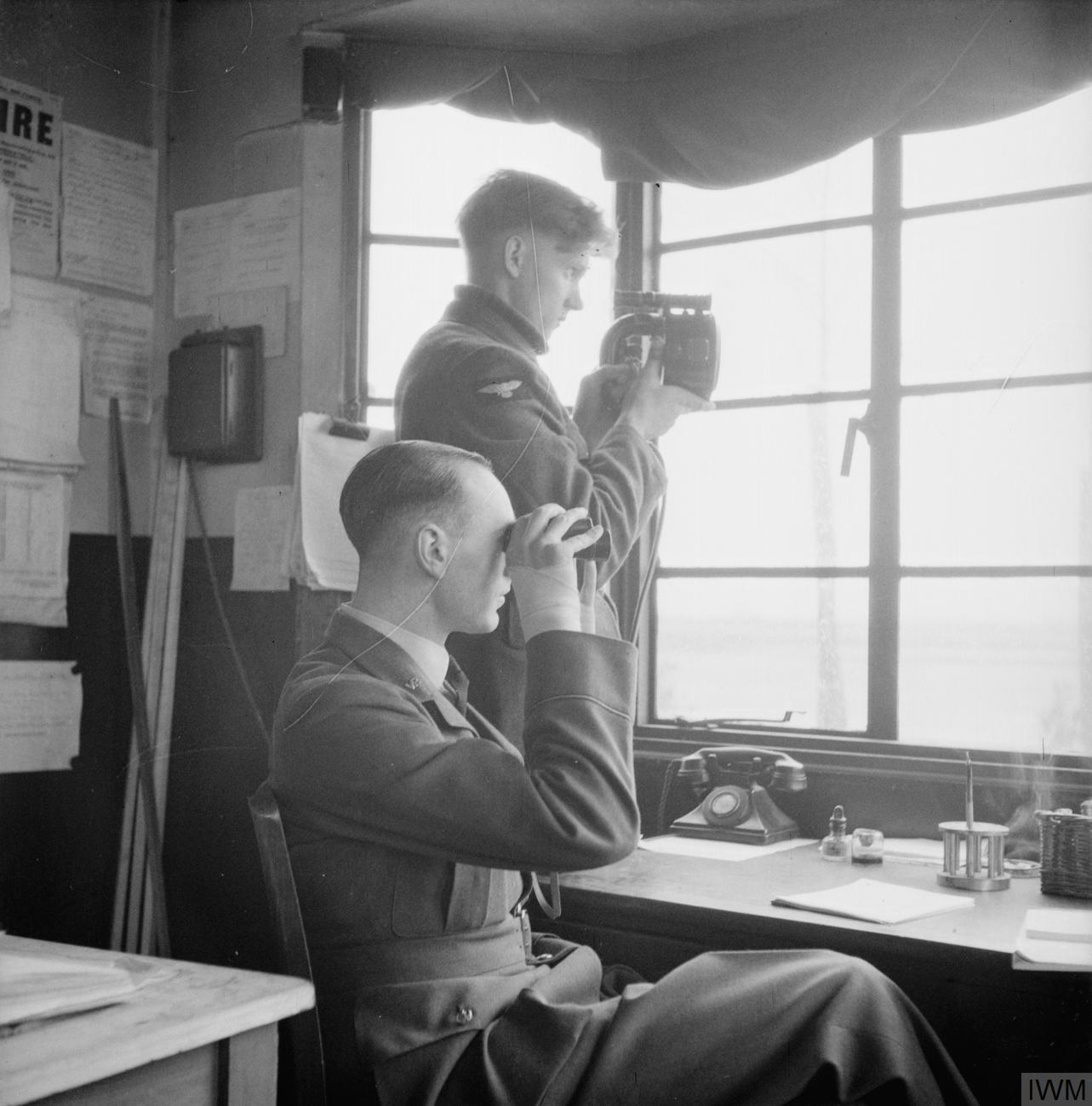
The duty officer in the tower at RAF Catfoss in Yorkshire keeps watch while an airman signals to an aircraft using an Aldis lamp, April 1941. Catfoss was home to No 2 (Coastal) OTU

When the demand for the Bristol Beaufighter aircrew reduced the training was transferred to No. 132 (Coastal) Operational Training Unit RAF and the unit was disbanded on 15 February 1944 at RAF Catfoss.

== Aircraft operated ==
No. 2 (Coastal) Operational Training Unit was equipped with numerous types and variants of aircraft:

- Avro Anson I
- Fairey Battle
- Bristol Blenheim I, IV, V
- Bristol Beaufort I, II
- Airspeed Oxford I, II
- de Havilland Tiger Moth II
- de Havilland Moth Minor
- Westland Lysander III, IIIA
- Handley Page Hampden I
- Bristol Beaufighter IC, VI
- Miles Master II
- Miles Martinet I
- Bristol Blenheim IV

== Officer Commanding ==
Note: The ranks shown are the ranks held at the time of holding the appointment of commanding officer, No. 2 (Coastal) Operational Training Unit RAF.

No. 2 (C) OTU commanding officers
Rank	name	from
Squadron Leader	J M Clarke	1 October 1940
Wing Commander / Group Captain	E F Haylock	27 October 1940
Group Captain	N V Moreton	27 April 1942
Group Captain	C W Busk	8 July 1943
Group Captain	C P Gabriel	27 August 1943

== Airfields used ==
The main airfield for the unit was RAF Catfoss however a number of different airfields were also used as relief landing grounds.

- Main operating base
  - RAF Catfoss.
- Used as relief landing grounds
  - RAF Driffield.
  - RAF Sherburn-in-Elmet.
  - RAF Hutton Cranswick.
  - RAF Lissett.

== See also ==
- List of Royal Air Force Operational Training Units
