= RAF Killadeas =

Former air force station in County Fermanagh, Northern Ireland

RAF Killadeas
- Killadeas, County Fermanagh in Northern Ireland

Site information
- Type: Royal Air Force station
- Owner: Air Ministry
- Operator: Royal Air Force
- Controlled by: RAF Coastal Command * No. 17 (T) Group RAF

Location
- Shown within Northern Ireland RAF Killadeas (the United Kingdom)
- Coordinates: 54°25′19″N 7°40′59″W

Site history
- Built: 1941
- In use: June 1942 - 1945
- Battles/wars: European theatre of World War II

Airfield information
- Elevation: 1 metre (3 ft 3 in) AMSL
- Other: Used Gublusk Bay for runways

Royal Air Force Killadeas, or more simply RAF Killadeas, is a former Royal Air Force station located 3.8 miles (6.1 km) southwest of Irvinestown, County Fermanagh, Northern Ireland and 6.1 miles (9.8 km) northwest of Enniskillen, County Fermanagh.

== History ==
The following units were based here at some point:

- No. 131 (Coastal) Operational Training Unit RAF (July 1942 - June 1945)
- No. 240 Squadron RAF (1941)
- No. 272 Maintenance Unit RAF (August 1945 - February 1947)
- No. 302 Ferry Training Unit RAF (April - July 1945)
- Coastal Command Flying Instructors School RAF (1945)

== Current use ==
The site is now used as the Lough Erne Yacht Club.
