= RAF Crosby-on-Eden =

Former Royal Air Force airfield in Cumbria, England

RAF Crosby-on-Eden
- Near Crosby-on-Eden, Cumbria in England

Site information
- Type: Royal Air Force station
- Code: KX
- Owner: Air Ministry
- Operator: Royal Air Force
- Controlled by: RAF Fighter Command 1941-42 * No. 81 (OTU) Group RAF; RAF Coastal Command 1942-44 * No. 17 Group RAF; RAF Transport Command 1944-

Location
- Shown within Cumbria RAF Crosby-on-Eden (the United Kingdom)
- Coordinates: 54°56′15″N 002°48′33″W

Site history
- Built: 1940/41
- In use: February 1941 - 1947
- Battles/wars: European theatre of World War II

Airfield information
- Elevation: 50 metres (164 ft) AMSL
Runways
Direction	Length and surface
00/00	Tarmac
00/00	Tarmac
00/00	Tarmac

Royal Air Force Crosby-on-Eden, or more simply RAF Crosby-on-Eden, is a former Royal Air Force station located 5.8 miles (9.3 km) north east of Carlisle, Cumbria and 3 miles (4.8 km) west of Brampton, Cumbria. It is nowadays Carlisle Lake District Airport.

== History ==
=== Civil use ===
In the early 1930s, Cumberland County Council opened Kingstown Municipal Airport, at the time outside the borough boundaries which later became the RAF Kingstown and is now Kingstown or Kingmoor Industrial estate. With the outbreak of war in 1939, RAF Kingstown's runway was too small for bombers, so the Royal Air Force developed a new airstrip at Crosby-on-Eden. The new facility came into operation in February 1941 for training operations, designating the station RAF Crosby-on-Eden.

=== Military use ===
The airfield was originally under the command of RAF Fighter Command housing No. 59 Operational Training Unit RAF (OTU) which provided day training for Hawker Hurricane pilots.

Coastal Command

The station was handed over to RAF Coastal Command, hosting No. 9 (Coastal) OTU during August 1942 for training long-range fighter crews on Bristol Beaufort and Bristol Beaufighter conversion squadrons, as well as air firing and night flying.

Transport Command

In August 1944 the station came under the command of RAF Transport Command with Douglas Dakotas of No. 109 (Transport) Operational Training Unit RAF. 109 OTU was then renamed No. 1383 (Transport) Conversion Unit RAF, on 1 August 1945 disbanding at Crosby-on-Eden on 6 August 1946.

The following units were also here at some point:

- Sub site for No. 14 Maintenance Unit RAF (April 1952)
- Detachment of No. 105 (Transport) OTU (August 1945)
- No. 2711 Squadron RAF Regiment

=== Post war ===
Crosby-on-Eden had little post war use and was closed in 1947 with the airfield returning to Carlisle City Council to continue as a municipal airport as what is now named Carlisle Lake District Airport with ownership passing to the Stobart Group.

== See also ==
- List of former Royal Air Force stations
