= No. 9 (Coastal) Operational Training Unit RAF =

Former Royal Air Force Coastal Command Operational Training Unit

No. 9 (Coastal) Operational Training Unit
- Active: 7 June 1942 - 11 August 1944
- Disbanded: 11 August 1944
- Country: United Kingdom
- Branch: Royal Air Force
- Type: Operational Training Unit
- Role: Aircrew Training
- Part of: RAF Coastal Command; *No. 17 Group RAF

No. 9 (Coastal) Operational Training Unit RAF (9 (C)OTU), was a training unit of the Royal Air Force, within No. 17 Group RAF, which was part of RAF Coastal Command. The unit was established during June 1942 and disbanded during August 1944.

== History ==
No. 9 (Coastal) Operational Training Unit RAF formed on 7 June 1942 at RAF Aldergrove, located near the village of Aldergrove in County Antrim, Northern Ireland. Its main purpose was to train up long range fighter aircrew. For this role it was equipped with Bristol Beaufighter, a British multi-role aircraft, Bristol Beaufort, a British twin-engined torpedo bomber, and Airspeed Oxford, a twin-engine monoplane trainer aircraft. The unit spent three months at RAF Aldergrove before relocating to RAF Crosby-on-Eden, which was located around 5.8 miles (9.3 km) north east of Carlisle, Cumbria, during September 1942. At its maximum throughput, while stationed at Crosby-on-Eden, No. 9 (C) OTU was providing aircrew training for seven units, with five for RAF Coastal Command within the European theatre of World War II and two in North Africa. It continued for almost two years and disbanded on 11 August 1944 at RAF Crosby-on-Eden, and was absorbed by No. 109 (Transport) Operational Training Unit RAF, with the aircrew training for the overseas obligation moving to No. 79 Operational Training Unit RAF.

== Aircraft operated ==
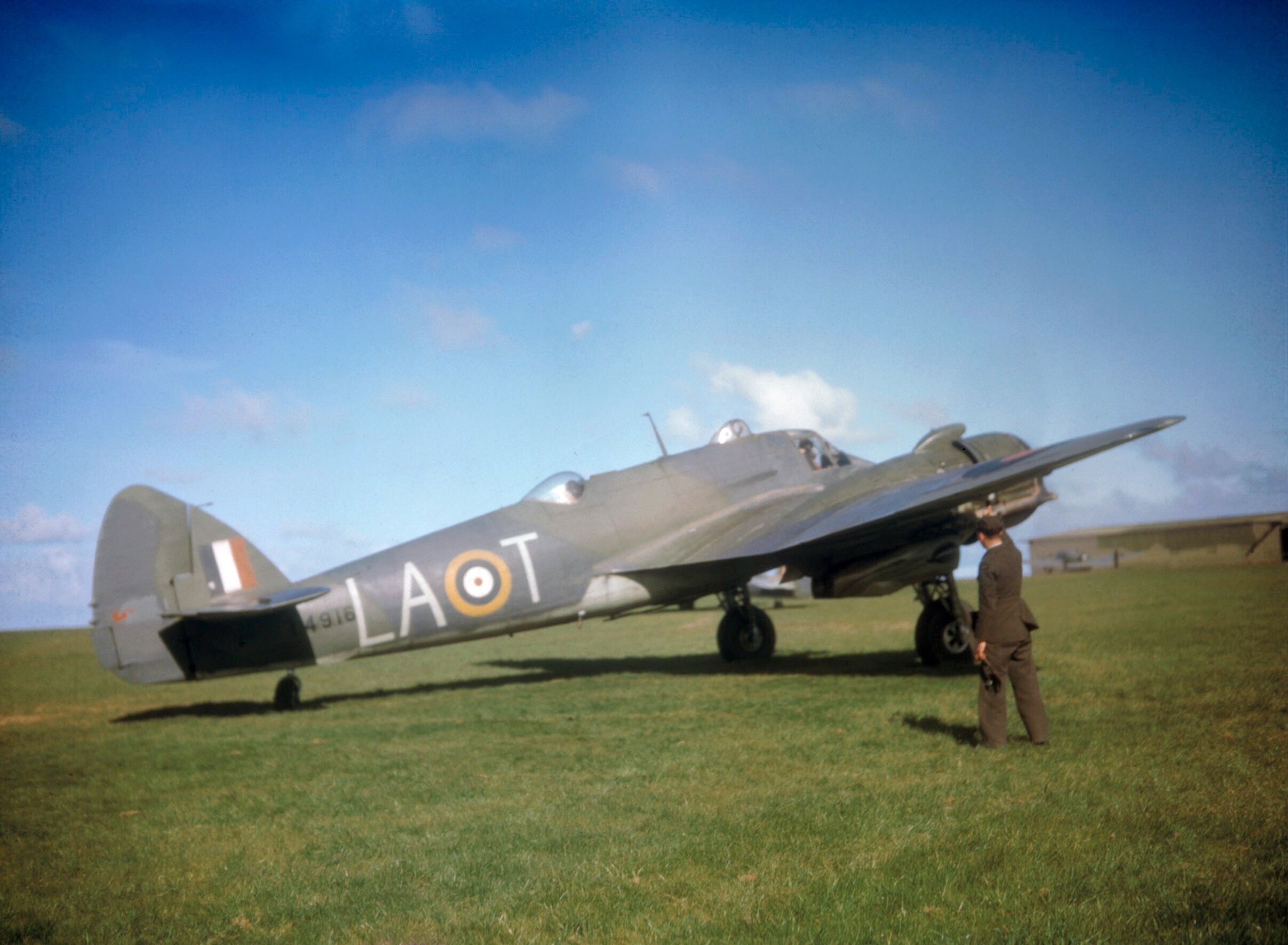
Beaufighter Mark IC, T4916 'LA-T', of No.235 Squadron RAF, preparing to taxy at a Coastal Command airfield, an example of the type used

No. 9 (Coastal) Operational Training Unit was equipped with numerous types and variants of aircraft:

- Bristol Beaufort I & II torpedo bomber
- Bristol Beaufighter IC, VI, X & XI multi role aircraft
- Miles Martinet I target tug aircraft
- de Havilland Tiger Moth II biplane trainer aircraft
- Miles Magister basic trainer
- Airspeed Oxford I & II twin engine trainer aircraft
- Westland Lysander III army co-operation and liaison aircraft

== Airfields used ==
No. 9 (Coastal) Operational Training Unit used two Royal Air Force stations throughout its existence:

- RAF Aldergrove from June 1942.
- RAF Crosby-on-Eden from September 1942 until August 1944.

== See also ==
- List of Royal Air Force Operational Training Units
