= Flying Boat Training Squadron RAF =

Former Royal Air Force Coastal Command Flying Boat Training Squadron

Flying Boat Training Squadron RAF ~~No. 235 Operational Conversion Unit RAF~~ ~~No. 4 (Coastal) Operational Training Unit RAF~~ ~~Seaplane Training Squadron RAF~~ ~~Seaplane Training Flight RAF~~
- Active: 2 January 1939 - 5 October 1956
- Country: United Kingdom
- Branch: Royal Air Force
- Type: Operational Conversion Unit
- Role: Flying boat training
- Part of: RAF Coastal Command

Flying Boat Training Squadron RAF is a former Squadron of the Royal Air Force which was operational between 1931 and 1956 through various names.

== Structure ==
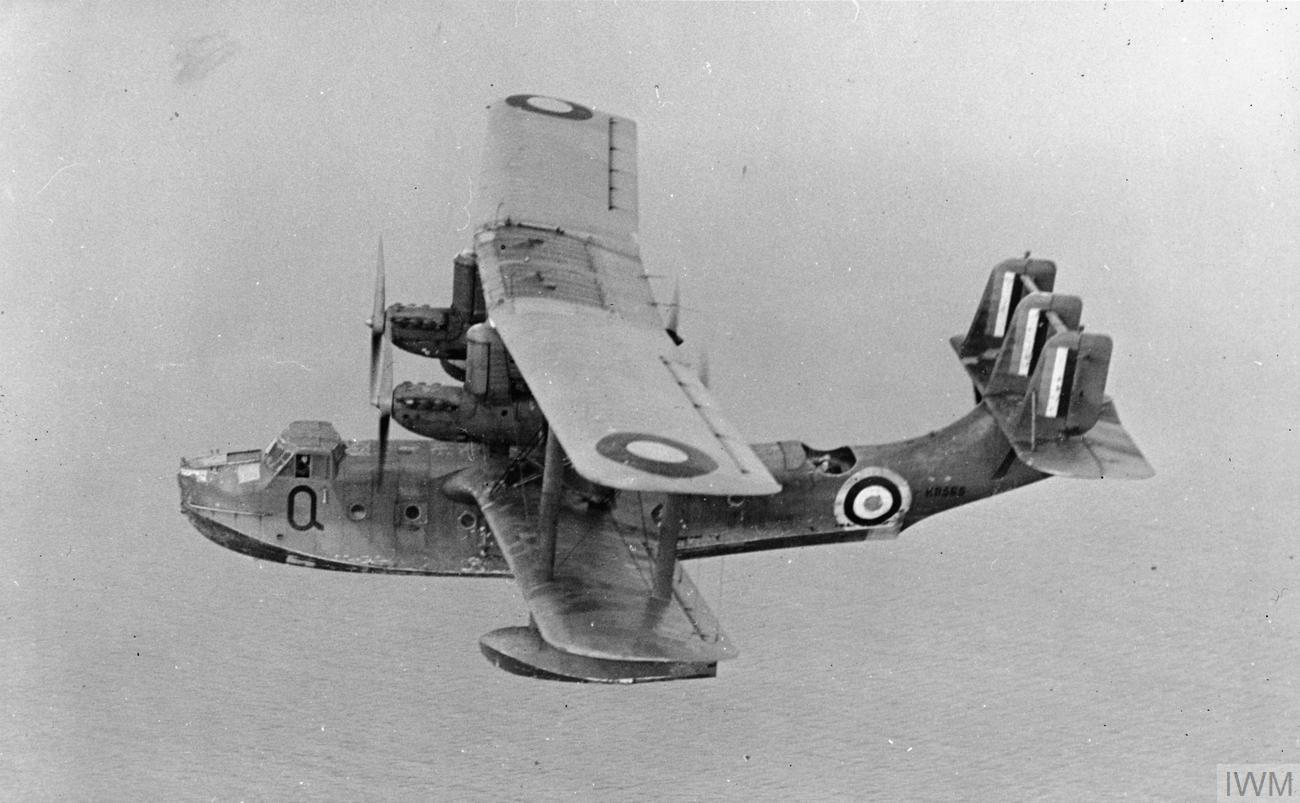
Short Singapore Mark III, K8565 Q, of No. 4 (Coastal) Operational Training Unit based at Stranraer, Ayrshire, in flight over the Irish Sea

The Flying Boat Training Squadron was formed on 2 January 1939 at RAF Calshot. It operated Supermarine Stranraer I, a British biplane flying boat, Supermarine Scapa I, a British general reconnaissance flying boat, and Short Singapore III, a British multi-engined biplane flying boat, before being disbanded and merged with the Seaplane Training Squadron to become No. 4 (Coastal) Operational Training Unit, on 16 March 1941.

History of the Seaplane Training Squadron

The Seaplane Training Squadron formed on 1 October 1931 at RAF Calshot by redesignating the Seaplane Training Flight, which itself had been formed on 5 February 1923 at RAF Calshot by redesignating an element of the disbanding Seaplane Training School, that was equipped with Fairey IIID, Fairey IIIF, and Supermarine Southampton I & II.

The Seaplane Training Squadron had a Floatplane Training Flight and in April 1938 this became independent of the squadron. The squadron operated a number of aircraft types and variants:

- Fairey III IIID & IIIF reconnaissance biplane
- Supermarine Southampton I & II reconnaissance flying boat
- Hawker Osprey I navalised carrier-borne fighter and reconnaissance two-seat biplane
- de Havilland Moth military training aircraft
- Saro Cloud amphibian flying boat
- Supermarine Scapa general reconnaissance flying boat
- Fairey Swordfish I biplane torpedo bomber

The Seaplane Training Squadron disbanded on 16 March 1941 at RAF Wig Bay and merged with the Flying Boat Training Squadron to become No. 4 (Coastal) Operational Training Unit RAF.

History of No. 4 OTU

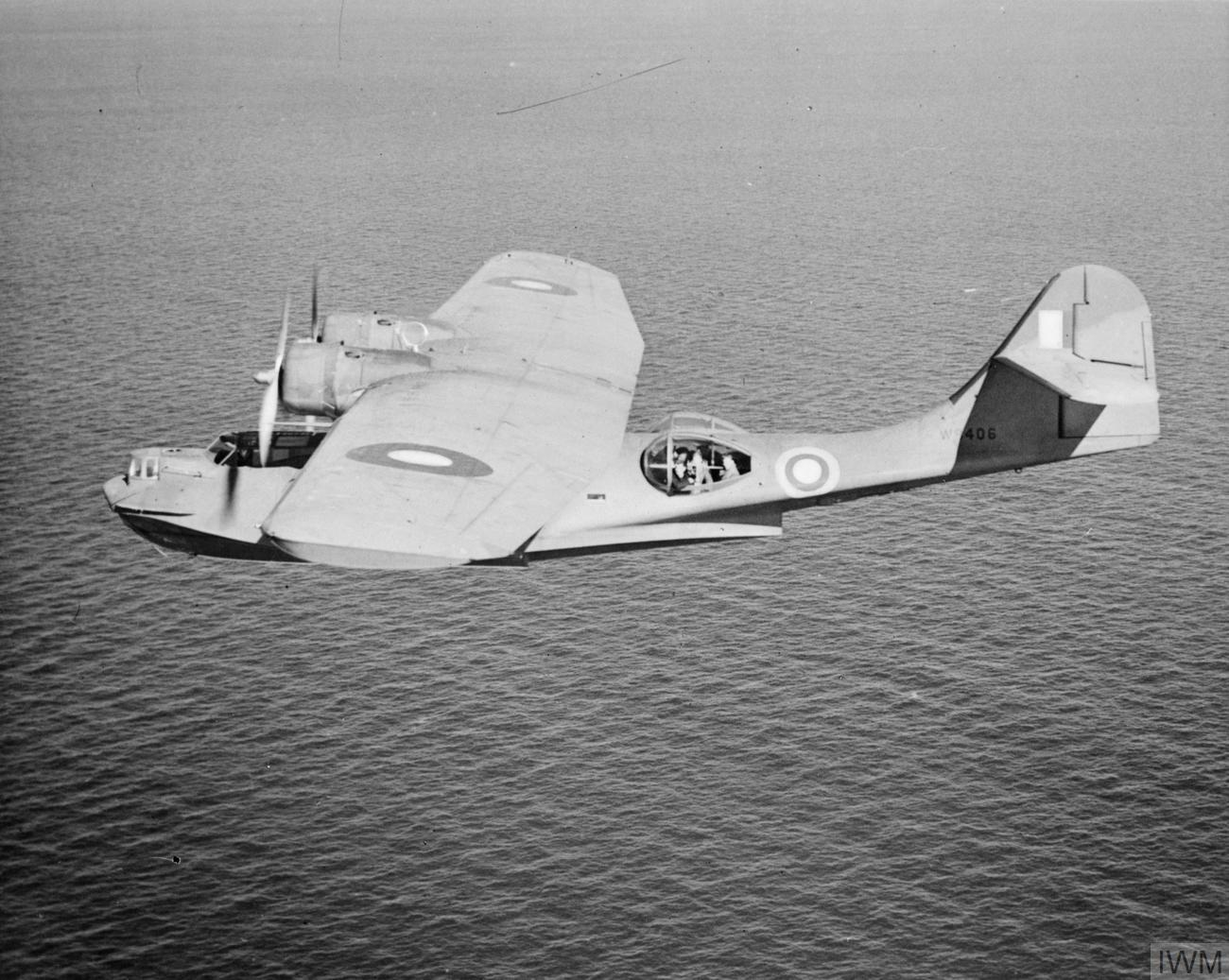
Catalina Mark I, W8406, of No. 4 (Coastal) Operational Training Unit based at Stranraer, Ayrshire, on a training flight over the Irish Sea

No. 4 (Coastal) Operational Training Unit RAF was formed on 16 March 1941. Its role was to train flying boat aircrew for RAF Coastal Command and the unit was formed within No. 17 Group RAF at RAF Stranraer. The unit was initially equipped with Short Singapore III, a British multi-engined biplane flying boat and it later received Supermarine Stranraer flying boat, Consolidated Catalina, a flying boat and amphibious aircraft, and Saunders-Roe A.36 Lerwick, a British flying boat. No. 4 (C) OTU then moved onto RAF Invergordon in June 1941, and in the following December it received Short Sunderland, a British flying boat patrol bomber. No. 4 (Coastal) Operational Training Unit was equipped with numerous types and variants of aircraft:

- Supermarine Stranraer I
- Saro London I & II
- Short Singapore III
- Saunders-Roe A.36 Lerwick I
- Westland Lysander III & IIIA
- Consolidated Catalina I, IB, II, IIA, IIIA IVA
- Short Sunderland I, II, III & V
- Miles Martinet I
- de Havilland Tiger Moth II
- Airspeed Oxford I
- Hawker Hurricane IIC
- Supermarine Spitfire

Flying boat aircrew training was split into two sections in February 1942. Operational training was done at RAF Invergordon, but initial flying boat training was relocated back at RAF Stranraer. However, with an expansion of RAF Invergordon completed, the latter element returned in November. The Consolidated Catalina were transferred to No. 131 (Coastal) Operational Training Unit RAF in Autumn 1943, and from Autumn 1944 the units land based aircraft briefly used RAF Evanton and then moved to RAF Tain. In August 1946 No. 4 (C) OTU moved to RAF Pembroke Dock, but just under twelve months later it disbanded, on 31 July 1947, to become No. 235 Operational Conversion Unit RAF.

History of No. 235 OCU

No. 235 Operational Conversion Unit was formed at RAF Calshot, as a redesignation of No. 4 (C) OTU, on 31 July 1947. It operated Short Sunderland V flying boat, and Short Seaford, a British long range maritime patrol bomber flying boat. Between August 1947 and April 1951 it was assigned the squadron code TA but then from April 1951 until October 1953 it had the squadron code D. The OCU disbanded on 17 October 1953 at RAF Calshot to become the Flying Boat Training Squadron.

Reformation

The Flying Boat Training Squadron was reformed at RAF Pembroke Dock on 17 October 1953 as a redesignation of No. 235 OCU. It operated with Short Sunderland V flying boat, before being disbanded less than 3 years later, on 5 October 1956, still at RAF Pembroke Dock.

== See also ==
- List of Royal Air Force Operational Training Units
- List of Royal Air Force schools
- List of conversion units of the Royal Air Force
