= No. 1 Torpedo Training Unit RAF =

Former Royal Air Force Coastal Command Operational Training Unit

No. 1 Torpedo Training Unit ~~Torpedo Training Unit~~
- Active: February 1936 - May 1944; August 1945 - December 1947
- Country: United Kingdom
- Branch: Royal Air Force
- Type: Training Unit
- Role: Aircrew Training
- Part of: RAF Coastal Command; *No. 17 Group RAF

Insignia
- Identification Markings: Nil (1936 - 1944); 9K Beaufighter, Oxford (1945 - 1947)

No. 1 Torpedo Training Unit RAF, was a training unit of the Royal Air Force. It was later allocated to No. 17 Group RAF, which was part of RAF Coastal Command. The unit was established during February 1936 and initially disbanded during May 1944, reforming in August 1945 and finally disbanding in December 1947

== History ==
'A' Torpedo Training Flight of RAF Base Gosport Training Squadron was redesignated at RAF Gosport, during February 1936, forming the Torpedo Training Unit. The unit moved from RAF Gosport in March 1940, relocating to RAF Abbotsinch located in Paisley, Renfrewshire, west of the city of Glasgow. Its primary role was to train aircrew, for use of torpedo bomber military aircraft, for both the Royal Air Force, and the Royal Navy's Fleet Air Arm. The unit mainly used Fairey Swordfish, a British biplane torpedo bomber, and Bristol Beaufort, a British twin-engined torpedo bomber military aircraft, but also had small numbers of Blackburn Shark, a British carrier-borne torpedo bomber and Blackburn Botha, a British four-seat reconnaissance and torpedo bomber military aircraft. In November 1942 it moved to RAF Turnberry, sited on headland along the Firth of Clyde in Ayrshire, southwest Scotland, overlooking the Isle of Arran and Ailsa Craig, and the Torpedo Training Unit was redesignated as No. 1 Torpedo Training Unit from 1 January 1943 at RAF Turnberry.

No. 2 Torpedo Training Unit

No. 2 Torpedo Training Unit RAF was formed within No. 17 Group RAF, on 19 December 1942 at RAF Castle Kennedy located in Castle Kennedy, Dumfries and Galloway, Scotland. It was equipped with Westland Lysander I, a British army co-operation and liaison aircraft, de Havilland Tiger Moth II, a 1930s British biplane operated as a primary trainer aircraft, Bristol Beaufort I, Airspeed Oxford II, a twin-engine monoplane trainer aircraft and Bristol Beaufighter VI, a British multi-role aircraft. The unit existed for only nine months before being disbanded on 29 September 1943, being absorbed by No. 1 Torpedo Training Unit RAF.

No. 1 Torpedo Training Unit

No. 1 Torpedo Training Unit continued in its role of torpedo bomber aircrew training at RAF Turnberry until it was absorbed by No. 5 (Coastal) Operational Training Unit RAF, with No. 1 TTU disbanding on 22 May 1944.

It reformed on 1 August 1945 at RAF Turnberry, again as No. 1 Torpedo Training Unit, but only operated there providing torpedo bomber aircrew training for less than four months, before relocating to RAF Tain, situated near Tain, Highlands in Scotland, during November 1945. It remained in Scotland for around one year moving south to RAF Thorney Island, located on Thorney Island, West Sussex, England, at the end of 1946.

It was operational for a further year and then No. 1 Torpedo Training Unit disbanded 10 December 1947 at RAF Thorney Island.

== Aircraft operated ==
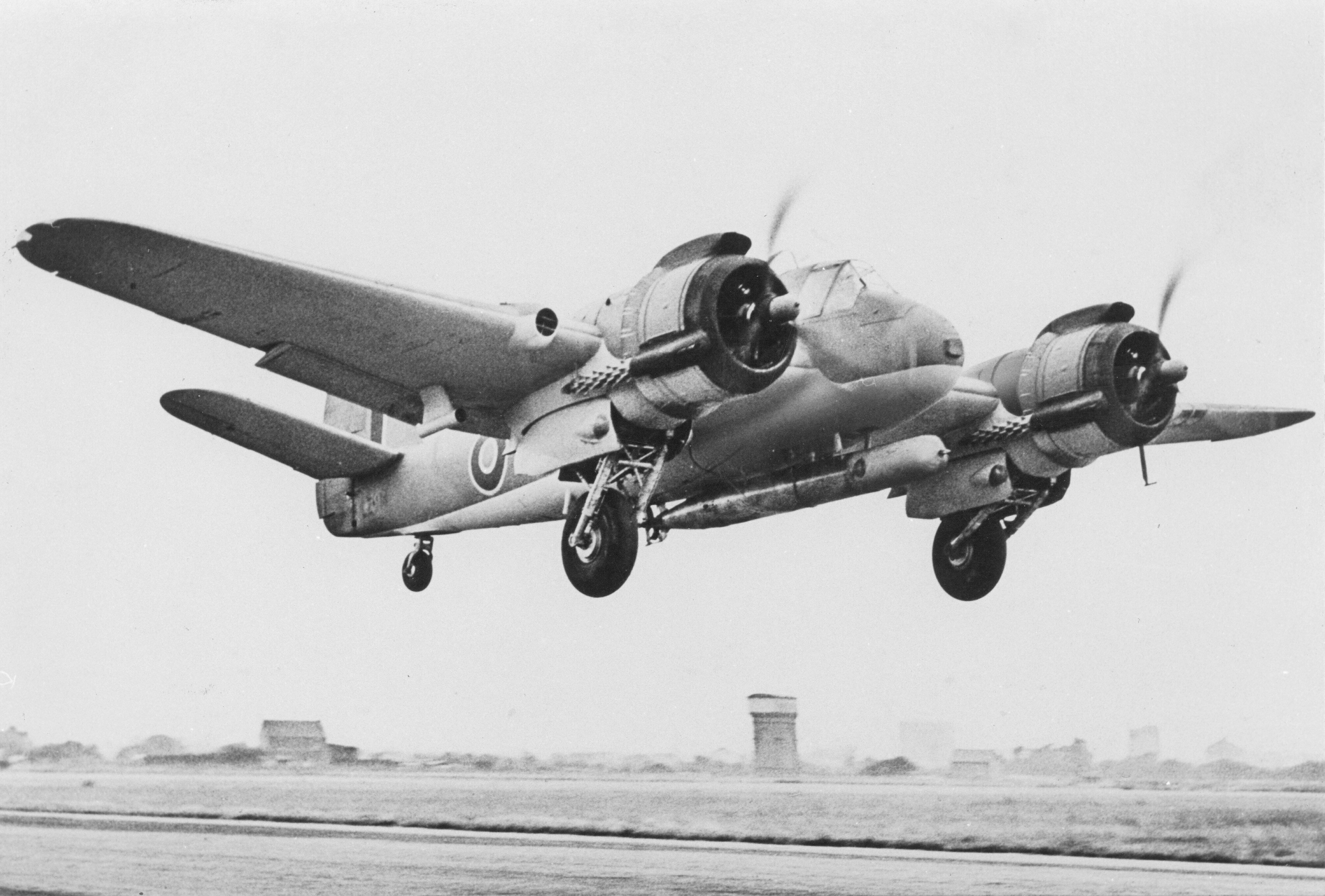
Bristol Beaufighter Mark X, LZ114, taking off from the Bristol Company's aerodrome at Old Mixon near Weston-super-Mare for an engine test, carrying a Mark XII aerial torpedo.An example of the type used by No. 1 TTU

The Torpedo Training Unit / No. 1 Torpedo Training Unit was equipped with numerous types and variants of aircraft:

- Blackburn Shark II & III torpedo-spotter-reconnaissance aircraft
- Fairey Swordfish I biplane torpedo bomber
- Blackburn Botha I reconnaissance and torpedo bomber
- Handley Page Hampden I medium bomber
- Bristol Beaufort I torpedo bomber
- Westland Lysander I army co-operation and liaison aircraft
- de Havilland Tiger Moth II biplane trainer aircraft
- Airspeed Oxford I & II trainer aircraft
- de Havilland Moth Minor tourer/trainer aircraft
- Vickers Wellington VIII & XI long range medium bomber
- Bristol Beaufighter X Heavy fighter / strike aircraft / Torpedo bomber

== Airfields used ==
Torpedo Training Unit / No. 1 Torpedo Training Unit and No. 2 Torpedo Training Unit used a number Royal Air Force stations throughout their existence:

Torpedo Training Unit

- RAF Gosport from February 1936 until March 1940.
- RAF Abbotsinch from March 1940 until November 1942.
- RAF Turnberry from November 1942

No. 1 Torpedo Training Unit

- RAF Turnberry from November 1942 until May 1944
- RAF Turnberry from August 1945 until November 1945
- RAF Tain November 1945 until 1946
- RAF Thorney Island from 1946 until December 1947

No. 2 Torpedo Training Unit

- RAF Castle Kennedy from December 1942 until September 1943

== See also ==
- List of Royal Air Force units & establishments
