= No. 1 (Coastal) Operational Training Unit RAF =

Former Royal Air Force Coastal Command Operational Training Unit

No. 1 (Coastal) Operational Training Unit
- Active: 1 April 1940 – 19 October 1943
- Disbanded: 19 October 1943
- Country: United Kingdom
- Branch: Royal Air Force
- Type: Operational Training Unit
- Role: Aircrew Training
- Part of: RAF Coastal Command; *No. 17 Group RAF

No. 1 (Coastal) Operational Training Unit RAF (1 (C)OTU), was a training unit of the Royal Air Force, within No. 17 Group RAF, which was part of RAF Coastal Command. The unit was established during April 1940 by the redesignating of an existing RAF Coastal Command unit, and disbanded during October 1943.

== History ==
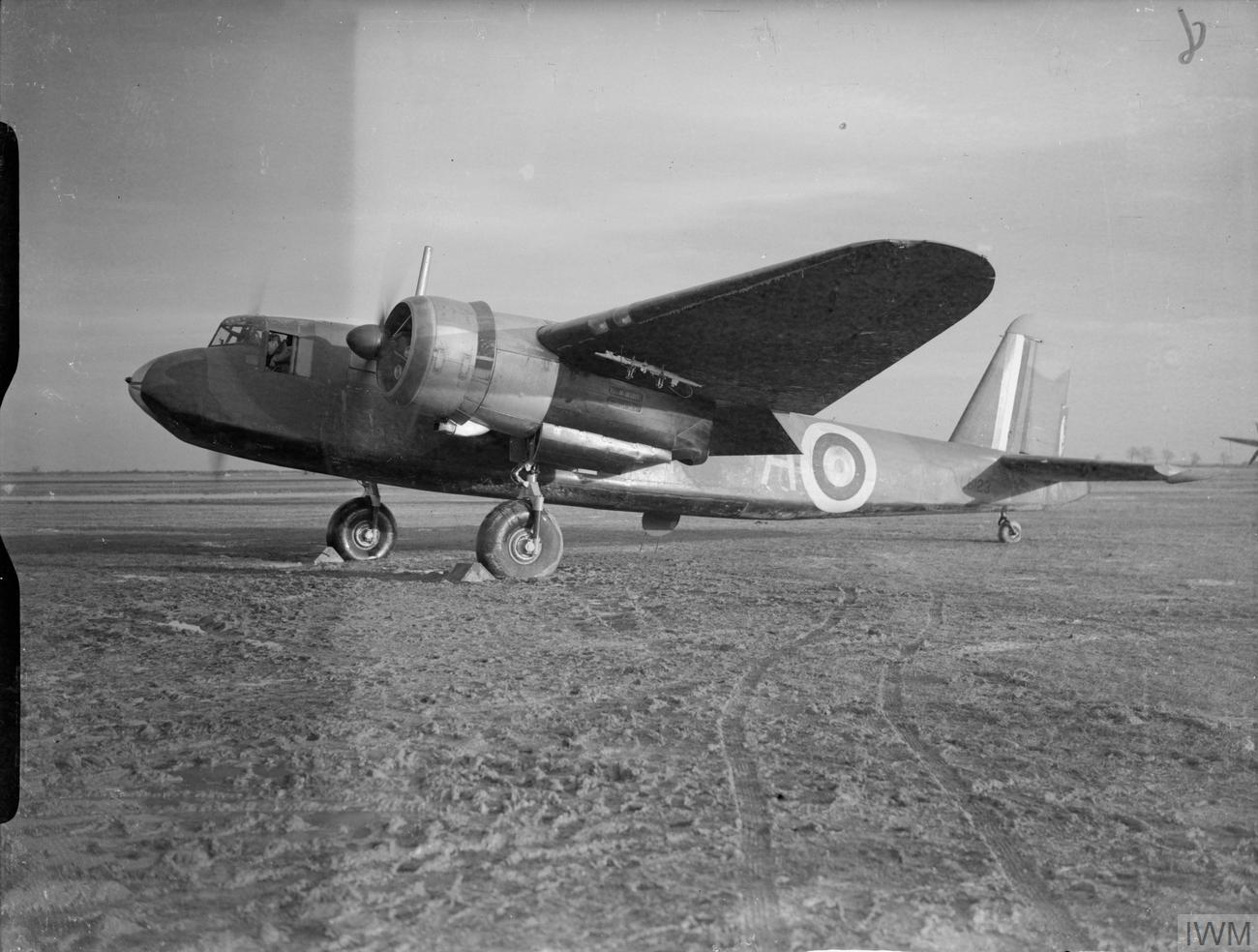
Blackburn Botha L8123 'A', of No. 1 (Coastal) Operational Training Unit, running up its engines at RAF Silloth,

=== Coastal Command Landplane Pilots School ===
The Coastal Command Landplane Pilots School RAF formed at RAF Silloth on 1 November 1939. The school was equipped with Avro Anson I, a British twin-engine, multi-role aircraft, Lockheed Hudson I, a US light bomber and coastal reconnaissance aircraft, Bristol Beaufort I, a British twin-engined torpedo bomber, and Vickers Wellington I, a British twin-engined, long-range medium bomber aircraft. It was operational for around five months, before disbanding, at RAF Silloth, to reform as No. 1 (Coastal) Operational Training Unit.

=== No. 1 (Coastal) Operational Training Unit ===
Forming on 1 April 1940, at RAF Silloth, by redesignating the Coastal Command Landplane Pilots School, No. 1 (Coastal) Operational Training Unit initially trained aircrews for RAF Coastal Command landplanes and was equipped with Avro Anson, Lockheed Hudson, Bristol Blenheim, a British light bomber, and Bristol Beaufort aircraft. However, with the creation of more OTU's the unit started to specialise in training Lockheed Hudson aircrew.

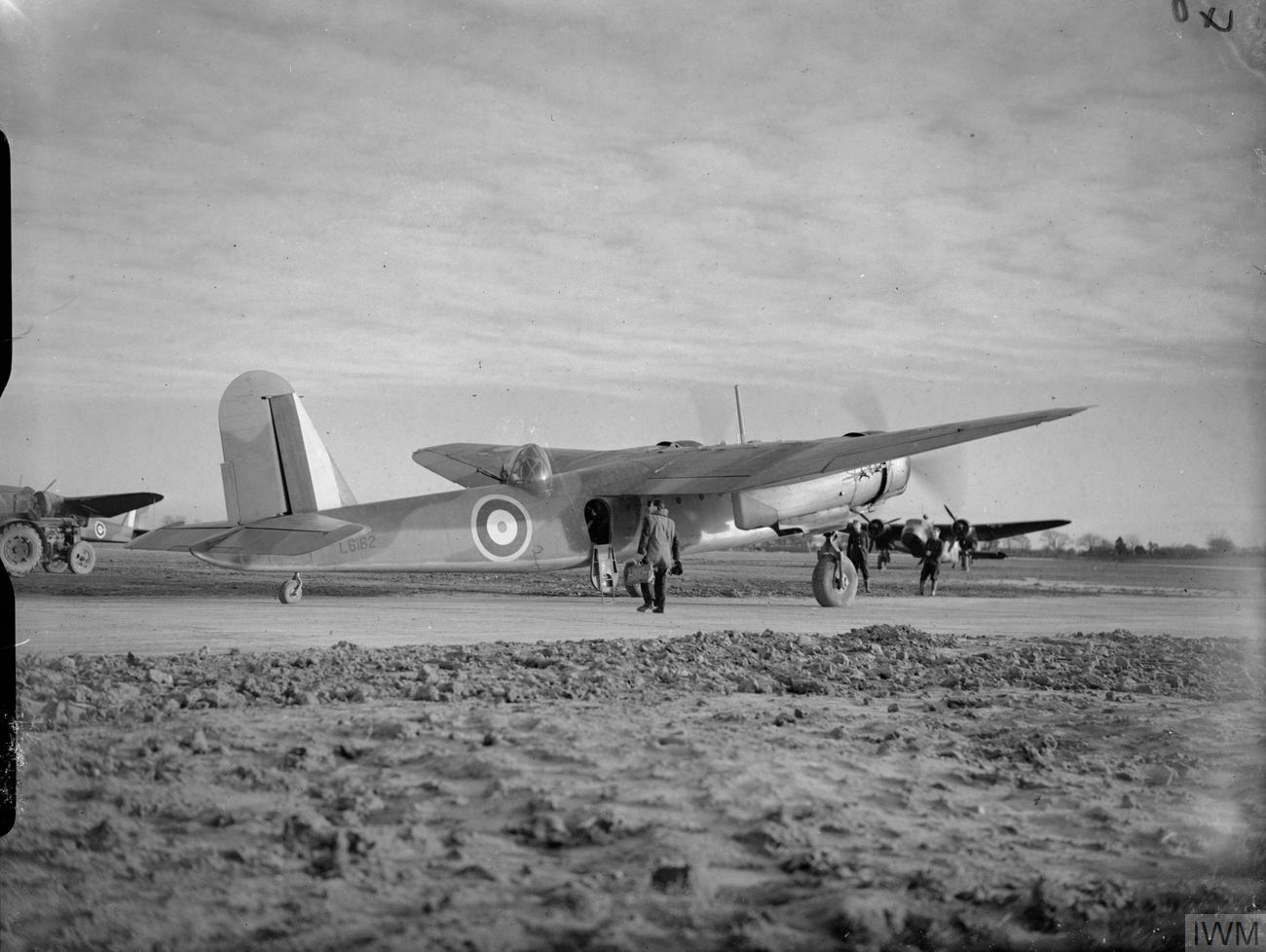
Blackburn Botha I, L6162, of No. 1 (Coastal) Operational Training Unit, preparing for departure on a training flight at RAF Silloth

On 23 March 1943 No. 1 (Coastal) Operational Training Unit moved to RAF Thornaby and the unit also provided aircrew training for Consolidated Liberator, an American heavy bomber, Boeing Fortress an American four-engined heavy bomber, and Handley Page Halifax a British four-engined heavy bomber. Roughly six months later, the Lockheed Hudson training moved to No. 5 (Coastal) Operational Training Unit RAF, before No. 1 (C) OTU disbanded on 19 October 1943, and the heavy bomber courses for Handley Page Halifax and Boeing Fortress were taken over by No. 1674 Heavy Conversion Unit RAF at RAF Aldergrove, which had not long formed, on 10 October 1943.

== Aircraft operated ==
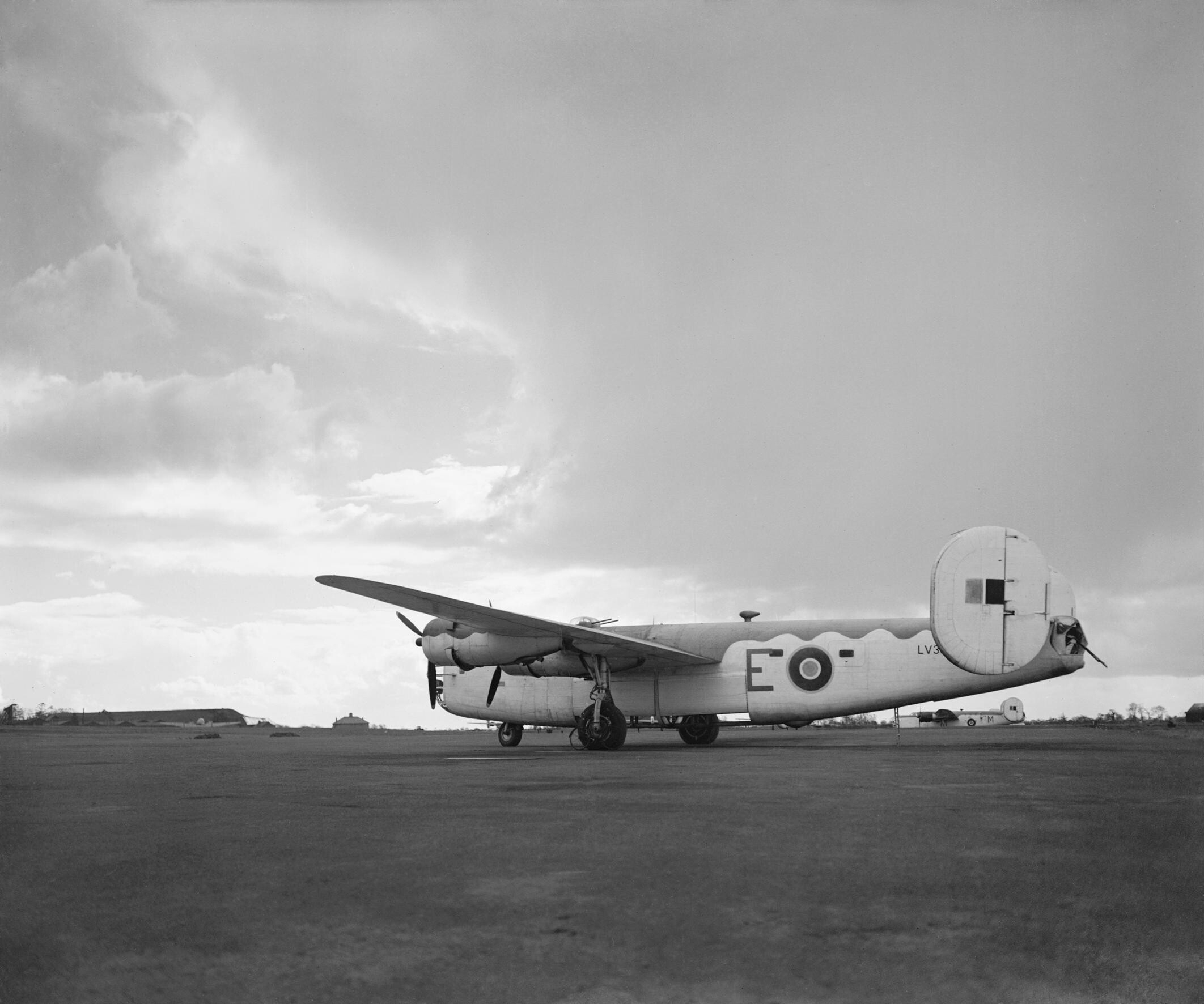
Liberator GR IIIA, LV345 'E', parked in a dispersal at Aldergrove, County Antrim, at the culmination of its service with of No. 86 Squadron RAF, and shortly before joining the Liberator Flight of No. 1 (Coastal) Operational Training Unit

No. 1 (Coastal) Operational Training Unit was equipped with numerous types and variants of aircraft:

- Avro Tutor
- Avro Anson I
- Blackburn Shark II
- Fairey Swordfish I
- Blackburn Roc I
- Bristol Beaufort I
- Fairey Battle
- Blackburn Botha I
- Vickers Wellington I, IA, IC and VIII
- Armstrong Whitworth Whitley V
- Lockheed Hudson I, II, V and VI
- Bristol Blenheim I and IV
- Westland Lysander III and IIIA
- Airspeed Oxford I
- Supermarine Spitfire I
- Handley Page Halifax II
- Miles Magister
- Boeing Fortress I and IIA
- Consolidated Liberator III and V
- Miles Martinet I

== Airfields used ==
- RAF Silloth as Coastal Command Landplane Pilots School RAF from November 1939 and No. 1 (C) OTU from April 1940.
- RAF Thornaby from March 1943 until October 1943.

== Accidents ==
During September 1942 a Lockheed Hudson I N7325 of the unit crashed on Cross Fell in the Peak District.

== See also ==
- List of Royal Air Force Operational Training Units
- List of Royal Air Force schools
- List of conversion units of the Royal Air Force
