= No. 131 (Coastal) Operational Training Unit RAF =

Former Royal Air Force Coastal Command Operational Training Unit

No. 131 (Coastal) Operational Training Unit
- Active: 20 July 1942 - 28 June 1945
- Country: United Kingdom
- Branch: Royal Air Force
- Type: Operational Training Unit
- Role: Aircrew Training
- Part of: RAF Coastal Command; *No. 15 Group RAF (1942); *No. 17 Group RAF (1942 - 1945)

No. 131 (Coastal) Operational Training Unit RAF, was a training unit of the Royal Air Force, initially within No. 15 Group RAF, then transferring to No. 17 Group RAF, both were part of RAF Coastal Command. The unit was established during July 1942 and disbanded during June 1945.

== History ==
No. 131 (Coastal) Operational Training Unit RAF was formed on 20 July 1942 at RAF Killadeas, located near Killadeas, County Fermanagh in Northern Ireland. RAF St Angelo, located near the village of Trory on the southern tip of Lower Lough Erne, also initially acted as parent HQ and was still used by support aircraft once the HQ moved to RAF Killadeas. The unit was tasked with training aircrew to use Consolidated Catalina, a US flying boat and amphibious aircraft. When formed it started out in No. 15 Group RAF, but in December 1942 the unit transferred to No. 17 Group RAF. In October 1943 the unit received No 4 (C) OTU‘s Consolidated Catalina flying boats and took over the units aircrew training on Catalina aircraft. Short Sunderland, a British flying boat patrol bomber, were added to the unit’s inventory during May 1944. They remained with No 131 (C) OTU for around nine months and were then transferred to No 4 (C) OTU on 13 February 1945. The Consolidated Catalina was withdrawn from RAF service, and the unit was disbanded on 28 June 1945.

== Aircraft operated ==
No. 131 (Coastal) Operational Training Unit RAF was equipped with numerous types and variants of aircraft:

- Consolidated Catalina I, IB, II, IIA, IIIA, IVA & IVB flying boat and amphibious aircraft
- Short Sunderland III & V flying boat patrol bomber
- Avro Anson I multi-role aircraft
- Airspeed Oxford I & II training aircraft
- Miles Martinet I target tug aircraft

== See also ==
- List of Royal Air Force Operational Training Units
