= Harry George Smart =

Royal Air Force Air Vice-Marshal (1891-1963)

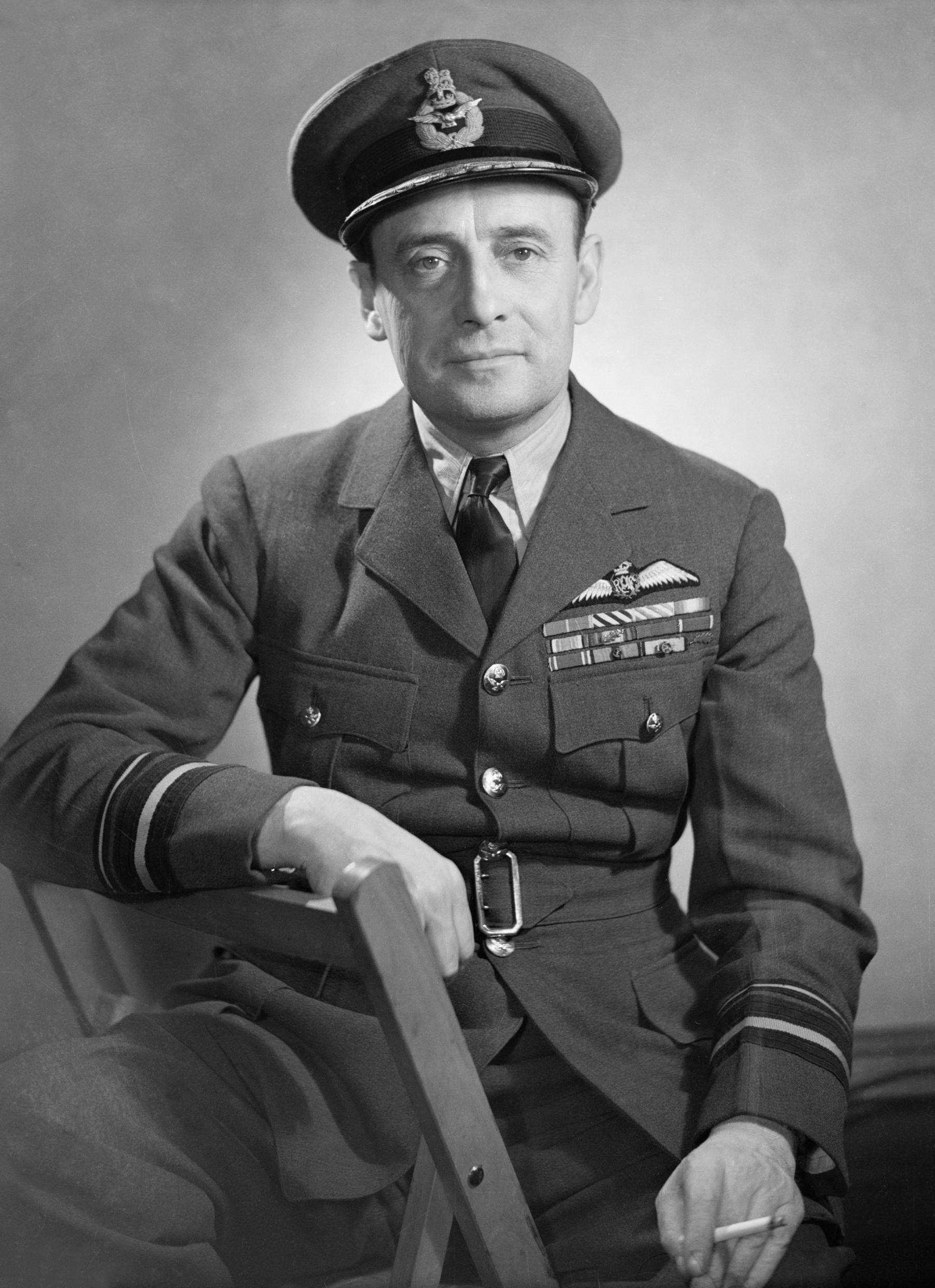
- Air Vice Marshal H G Smart
- Born: 28 June 1891; Newmarket, Suffolk, England
- Died: 28 June 1963 (aged 72)
- Spouse: Doris Constance Corfe (m. 1924)
- Children: Naida P (born 1925)
- Military career
- Allegiance: United Kingdom
- Branch: British Army (c.1915–18); Royal Air Force (1918–45)
- Service years: 1915–45
- Rank: Air Vice Marshal
- Nicknames: Reggie
- Commands: No. 17 (Operational Training) Group (1941–45); British Forces in Iraq (1939–41); RAF Martlesham Heath (1937–38); Central Flying School (1935–37); No. 99 Squadron (1930–32); No. 208 Squadron (1919)
- Conflicts: First World War; Second World War: Anglo-Iraqi War
- Awards: Commander of the Order of the British Empire; Distinguished Flying Cross; Air Force Cross; Mentioned in Despatches; Grand Commander of the Order of the Phoenix (Greece)

Harry George Smart, CBE, DFC, AFC (28 June 1891 – 28 June 1963) is best known for having been the commander of RAF Habbaniya during the first part of the Anglo-Iraqi War. Smart was an officer in the British Army, the Royal Flying Corps and the Royal Air Force. He served during the First World War, during the interwar period, and during the Second World War.

== Biography ==
In 1891, Harry George "Reggie" Smart was born in Newmarket, Suffolk, in the United Kingdom. Smart attended Framlingham College between 1905 and 1907 and joined the British Army sometime thereafter. He served as a Sapper with the Royal Engineers.

On 30 November 1915, Smart received a commission with the Royal Flying Corps. From 29 April 1916, he was a Morane Bullet pilot with No. 60 Squadron on the Western Front. On 23 Jul 1917, Smart was made a squadron Flight Commander and, by 30 Apr 1918, he was Officer Commanding of a squadron. On 14 Jan 1919, Smart was Officer Commanding of No. 208 Squadron. On 1 Aug 1919, Smart was awarded a permanent commission as a captain. By 9 Feb 1920, Smart was a Flight Commander of No. 6 Squadron and, by May 1920, he was made the squadron's acting Officer Commanding. The squadron was located in Mosul in the British Mandate of Iraq and flew Bristol F2B fighters.

=== Interwar period ===
On 4 Feb 1923, Squadron Leader Smart became a Certified Flight Instructor (CFI) at the Central Flying School (CFS). The Commandant of the CFS at that time was Group Captain Felton Holt. On 12 Nov 1927, Smart was seconded to the Royal Australian Air Force (RAAF). On 5 February 1930, his service with the RAAF ended. By 19 February, he was the Officer Commanding No. 99 Squadron.

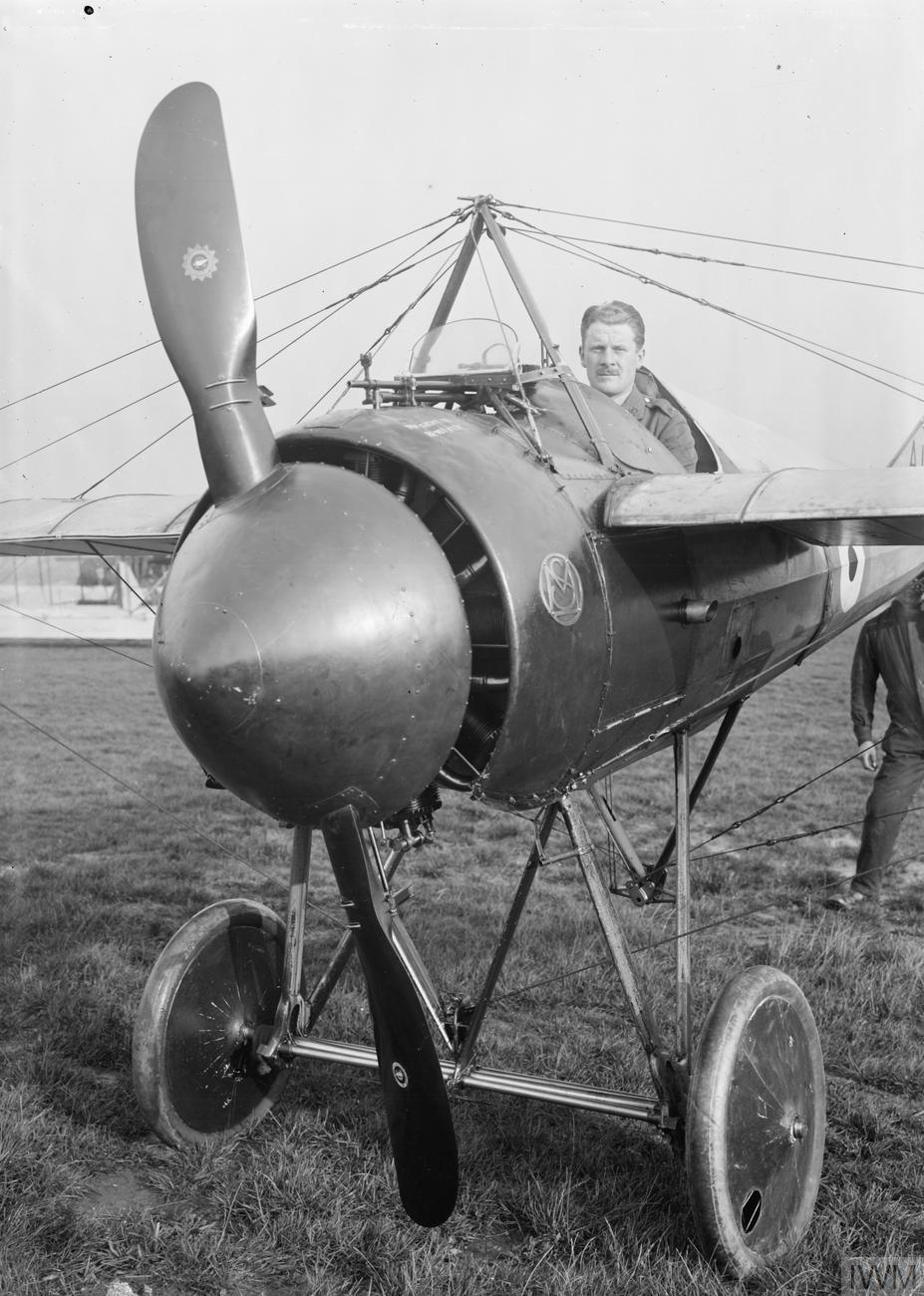
Morane Bullet.

In 1935, Wing Commander Smart was named Commandant of the Central Flying School. He was soon tasked with supervising the relocation of the school from RAF Wittering back to the original RAF Upavon location. Two weeks after completing the move, Smart was sent to the United States to study American instructional methods.

On 18 Jan 1937, Group Captain Smart took command of the Aeroplane and Armament Experimental Establishment at RAF Martlesham Heath where he soon made his opinion of contractors known: "Our job is to test aircraft, not to tell the constructors how to design them." This sentence was from a speech made by Smart during the "Sixteenth Annual Contractors' Dinner." His speech was greeted with applause. The significance of the remark, and the sly dig contained therein, was not lost on any one of those present.

In 1939, Smart became the Commander of the British Forces in Iraq.

=== Second World War ===
Air Vice Marshal Smart was the Air Officer Commanding (AOC) at RAF Habbaniya in the Kingdom of Iraq when Iraqi rebels took up strong positions on the plateau overlooking the base with the objective of overrunning the base. He was also AOC of all RAF forces in Iraq and reported to Arthur Longmore and to Air Vice Marshal (Acting Air Marshal) Arthur Tedder of the RAF Middle East Command. During the tense period of time after the Iraqis positioned themselves on the plateau, Smart communicated directly with the British Ambassador to Iraq, Kinahan Cornwallis who was also in contact with London.

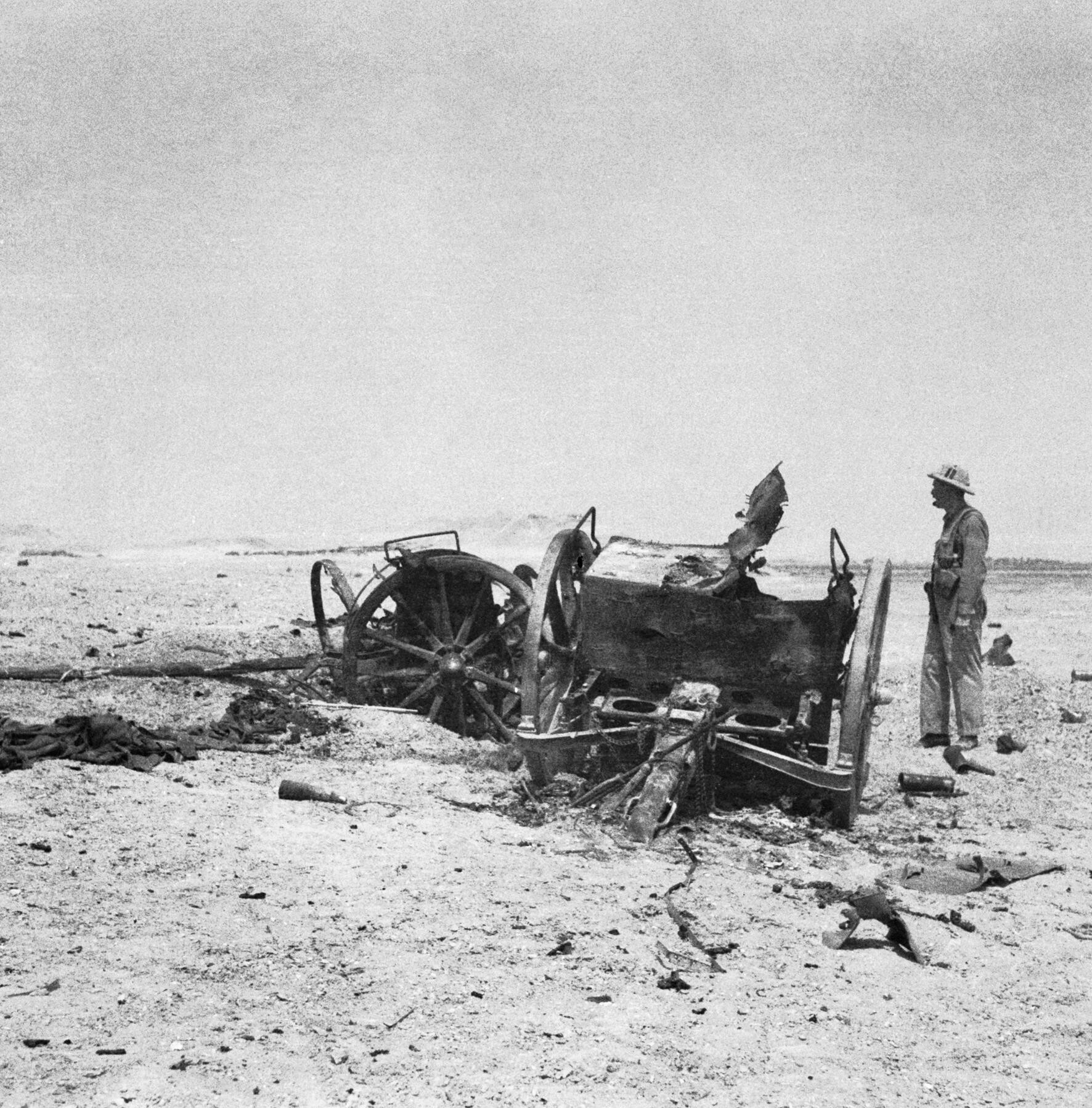
An RAF officer investigates wrecked Iraqi artillery on the plateau above Habbaniya.

Smart's tactics to defend the Habbaniya cantonment was to mount continuous bombing and strafing attacks with as many aircraft as possible. At 05:00 on 2 May, 33 aircraft from Habbaniya, out of the 56 operational aircraft based there, and eight Wellington bombers, from RAF Shaibah, began the attack. What became known as the Anglo-Iraqi War was now under way. British Prime Minister Winston Churchill hoped that Smart would be able to hold out at Habbaniya until Habforce could advance from Palestine and relieve him on 12 May. However, in a matter of days, the Iraqi forces were suffering heavy losses. Late on 6 May, the Iraqis abandoned the plateau and left much equipment. In the end, the flying column of Habforce, Kingcol, did not reach Habbaniya until 18 May. On 25 May, the main body of Habforce arrived.

On 5 May, AVM Smart was injured in a car accident during the night-time blackout and was evacuated from Habbaniya on medical grounds with multiple injuries Smart was evacuated to Basra and then onto India, together with his wife and daughter (who had been tending the wounded in the hospital but were evacuated from Habbaniya to Basrah on the 3rd day of the Siege). Colonel Ouvry Roberts assumed de facto command of the land operations at RAF Habbaniya. AVM John D'Albiac, who had just returned from Greece, took command of the aerial forces.

Also on 7 May, apparently unaware of Smart's injury, Churchill sent the following message to Smart: "Your vigorous and splendid action has largely restored the situation. We are all watching the grand fight you are making. All possible aid will be sent. Keep it up!".

On 17 November 1941, Smart was named AOC of No. 17 (Operational Training) Group. On 1 September 1945, Smart retired from the RAF.

== Honours and awards ==
- 28 October 1921 – Flight Lieutenant Harry George Smart, RAF is awarded the Distinguished Flying Cross For energy, gallantry and leadership. This officer has shown a very fine example to his fellow officers, especially during low bombing raids, when he has frequently descended among heavy rifle fire to very low altitude to ensure accurate bombing of small targets. He has taken part in 25-day bombing raids and two night raids.
- 23 December 1922 – Squadron Leader Harry George Smart, DFC, Royal Air Force is appointed an Officer of the Order of the British Empire
- 1927 Birthday Honours – Squadron Leader Harry George Smart, OBE, DFC is awarded the Air Force Cross
- 23 September 1941 – Acting Air Vice-Marshal Harry George Smart, OBE, DFC, AFC is appointed a Commander of the Order of the British Empire
- 29 December 1942 – Air Commodore Harry George Smart, CBE, DFC, AFC is appointed a Grand Officer of the Royal Order of the Phoenix (Greece) by the King of the Hellenes in recognition of valuable service rendered in connection with the war.
- 1943 – Acting Air Vice-Marshal Harry George Smart, CBE, DFC, AFC is appointed to the Order of the Two Rivers at the Dorchester Hotel by Abdul Illah Regent of Iraq in recognition of assisting his escape from rebel forces during the Anglo-Iraqi War of May 1941.

== Notes ==
Military offices
Preceded by Christopher Courtney	Air Officer Commanding British Forces in Iraq; 1939–1941	Succeeded by John D'Albiac
