= RAF Silloth =

Former RAF airfield in Cumbria, England

RAF Silloth
- Near Silloth, Cumbria in England

Site information
- Type: Royal Air Force Station
- Owner: Air Ministry
- Operator: Royal Air Force
- Controlled by: RAF Coastal Command; RAF Maintenance Command

Location
- Shown within Cumbria RAF Silloth (the United Kingdom)
- Coordinates: 54°52′10″N 003°21′37″W

Site history
- Built: 1939
- In use: 1939 - 1960
- Battles/wars: European theatre of World War II

Airfield information
- Elevation: 7 metres (23 ft) AMSL
Runways
Direction	Length and surface
04/22	1,420 metres (4,659 ft) Asphalt
09/27	980 metres (3,215 ft) Asphalt
18/36	1,050 metres (3,445 ft) Asphalt
- Other airfield facilities: Operational dates.

Royal Air Force Silloth, or more simply RAF Silloth, is a former Royal Air Force station one mile (1.6 km) north-east of Silloth, Cumbria, England, and 6.7 miles (10.8 km) south-west of Kirkbride, Cumbria. The station was used by RAF Coastal Command.

The airfield is also known as Silloth Airfield/Aerodrome.

== Station history ==
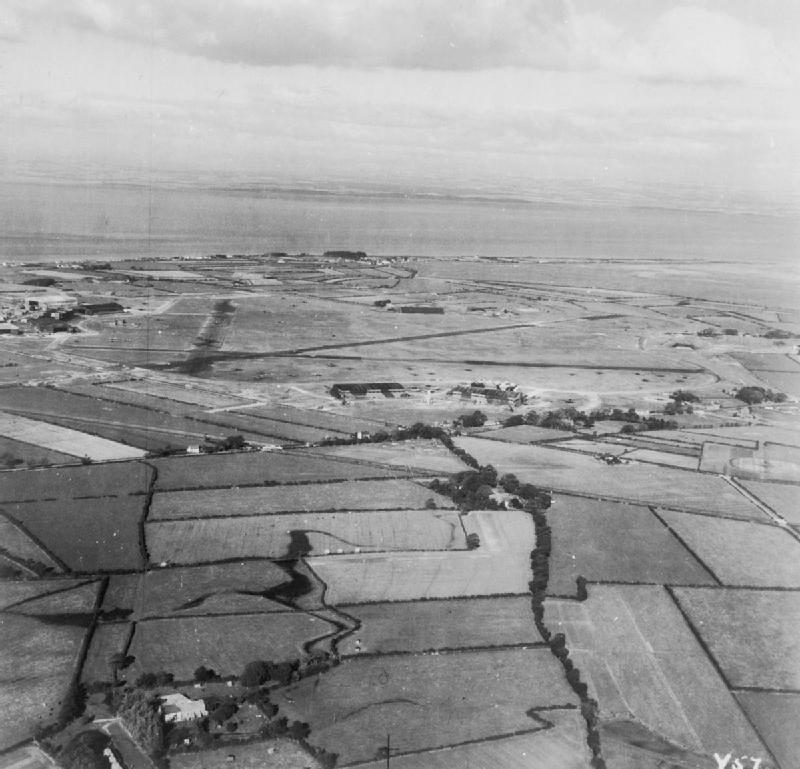
The airfield as camouflaged during World War II

The airfield was originally designed to be used by RAF Maintenance Command but was handed over to Coastal Command in November 1939. It had a satellite at RAF Hornby Hall.

== Airfield defences ==
In February 2026, a Pickett-Hamilton fort, excavated from its originally location at RAF Silloth, was restored and moved, becoming part of the Silloth Military Trail display on The Green, Silloth, Cumbria.

== Based units ==
- No. 1 (Coastal) Operational Training Unit RAF (OTU) using Avro Ansons, Bristol Beauforts and Bothas
- No. 6 Operational Training Unit RAF with the Vickers Wellington and Anson
- No. 215 Squadron RAF using the Wellington
- No. 320 (Netherlands) Squadron RAF using the Avro Anson I
- No. 22 Maintenance Unit RAF
- No. 1353 (Target Towing) Flight RAF using the Supermarine Spitfire and the Vultee A-31 Vengeance
- No. 5 Ferry Pool RAF

== Current use ==
Many of the buildings still survive, including the hangars, but the runways are in a bad condition.

A farmers' market and Solway Holiday Park occupy the outer edge of the airport. A number of private homes are found on the north-west side of the former airfield. Enkev, a natural fibre company, has its UK office at the airfield.

== See also ==
- List of former Royal Air Force stations
