= RAF Catfoss =

Former Royal Air Force station in Yorkshire, England

RAF Catfoss
- Brandesburton, East Riding of Yorkshire in England
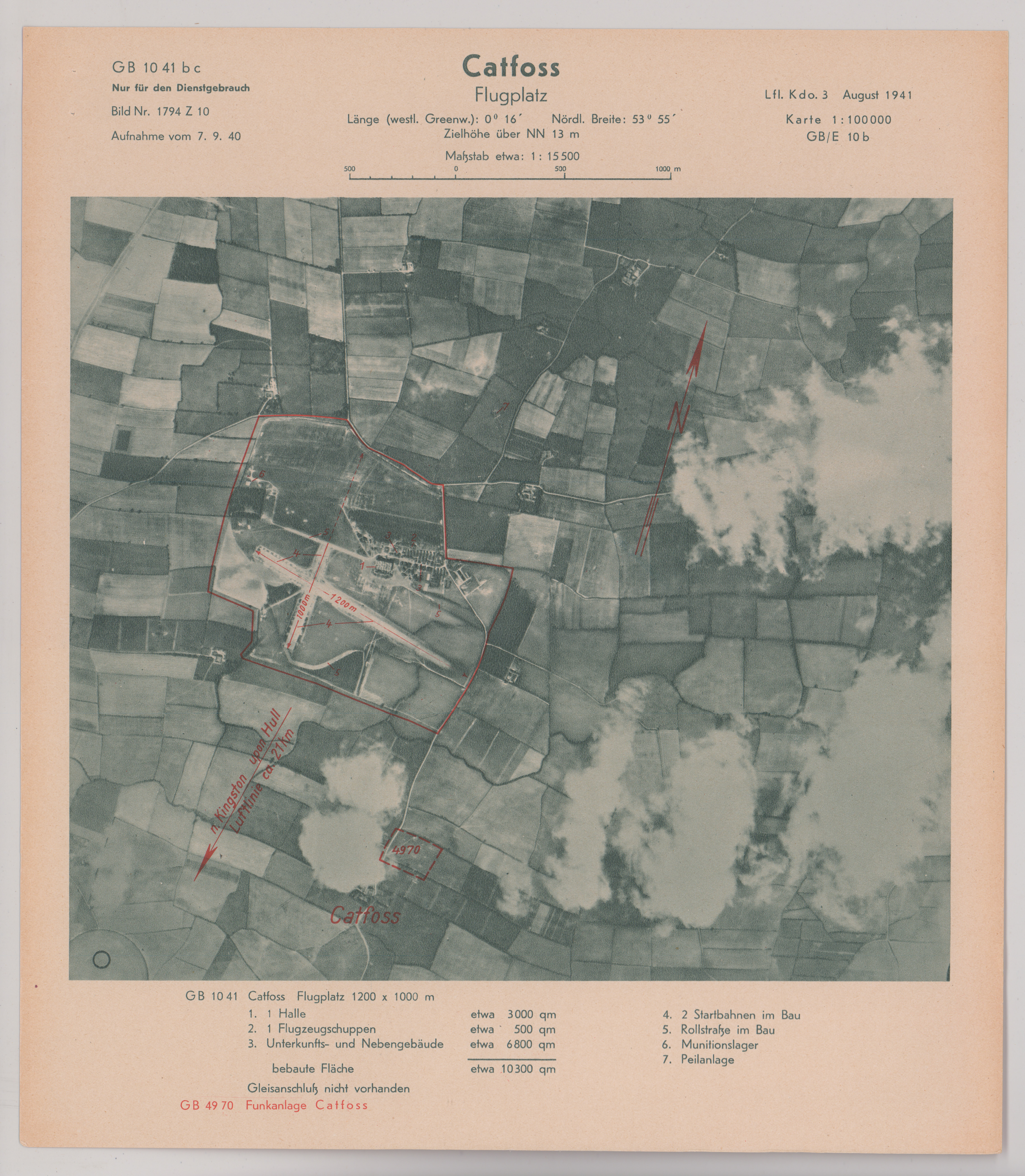
- RAF Catfoss on a target dosier of the german air force, 1941

Site information
- Type: Royal Air Force station
- Owner: Ministry of Defence
- Operator: Royal Air Force
- Controlled by: RAF Coastal Command; RAF Bomber Command

Location
- Shown within East Riding of Yorkshire RAF Catfoss (the United Kingdom)
- Coordinates: 53°55′15″N 000°16′30″W

Site history
- Built: 1930/31
- In use: 1932 - 1945; 1958 - 1963
- Battles/wars: European theatre of World War II

Airfield information
- Elevation: 11 metres (36 ft) AMSL
Runways
Direction	Length and surface
00/00	Concrete and wood chips
00/00	Concrete and wood chips
00/00	Concrete and wood chips

Royal Air Force Catfoss, or more simply RAF Catfoss, is a former Royal Air Force station during the Second World War. It was located 4 miles (6.4 km) west of Hornsea, East Riding of Yorkshire, England and 8 miles (13 km) north-east of Leconfield, East Riding of Yorkshire, with the nearest village being Brandesburton.

The airfield was opened in 1932 for an Armament Training Camp. A small number of fighters were posted there, at the start of the Second World War, before the airfield was rebuilt as a bomber station. It initially closed in November 1945, but re-opened in 1959 as a site for the PGM-17 Thor ballistic missile. It closed again in 1963.

== History ==
Catfoss was originally used as a grass airfield in the 1930s. On 1 January 1932, No. 1 Armament Training Camp was formed there, with a wide variety of aircraft that used the nearby gunnery ranges to teach air-to-air and air-to-ground gunnery, and bombing. In 1935 a number of Handley Page Heyford heavy bombers were based at Catfoss with 97 Squadron. The armament camp continued to be busy into the late 1930s, being renamed No. 1 Armament Training Station. With the approach of war, it was decided that the east coast was too vulnerable to attack for training and the unit moved out during 1939.

A detachment of Supermarine Spitfires of No. 616 Squadron RAF from RAF Leconfield arrived for air defence in 1940. The airfield was expanded and re-opened in August that year. From July to October, No. 16 Operational Training Unit RAF (OTU) used the station and nearby ranges for night-bomber training. The airfield was then transferred to RAF Coastal Command and No. 2 (Coastal) Operational Training Unit RAF was formed on 1 October 1940 to train crews on the command's twin-engined fighter and strike aircraft. The airfield became very busy with different aircraft types and training courses and three concrete runways were built at the end of 1942.

The unit also trained Bristol Beaufighter crews for deployment to Far East and Middle East squadrons. Having completed this work, the OTU was disbanded in October 1944.

The Central Gunnery School transferred in from RAF Sutton Bridge in March 1944, continuing its role of training experienced aircrew to become Gunnery Instructors for both Fighter and Bomber Commands. (For further detail of training undertaken see RAF Sutton Bridge). The principal aircraft used were Spitfires and Vickers Wellingtons, together with support aircraft for roles such as target towing. With the end of the Second World War the number of students reduced and the school moved to RAF Leconfield in October 1945. The station was closed down on 12 November 1945.

A proposal was announced in 1947 to turn Catfoss into a civil airport, but this never eventuated. In 1958 the need to base the new PGM-17 Thor intermediate-range ballistic missile led to a massive concrete launch site being built in the centre of the airfield, under the control of No. 226 Squadron RAF. The site began operating on 1 August 1959. The missiles were withdrawn from service on 9 March 1963 and the airfield was again closed.

== RAF units and aircraft ==
Unit	Dates	Aircraft	Variant	Notes
No. 97 Squadron RAF	1935	Handley Page Heyford	IA	Twin-engined heavy biplane bomber only posted here for a few weeks in September.
No. 226 Squadron RAF	1959–1963	PGM-17 Thor		Intermediate-range ballistic missile.
No. 616 Squadron RAF	1939–1940	Supermarine Spitfire	I	Air defence detachment from RAF Leconfield
No. 2 (Coastal) Operational Training Unit RAF	1940–1944	Bristol Blenheim; Avro Anson; Bristol Beaufighter		RAF Coastal Command training unit

- Central Gunnery School (1944–1945)
- No. 1 Armament Training Camp RAF (1932–1938)
- No. 1 Armament Training Station RAF (1938–1939)

== Current use ==
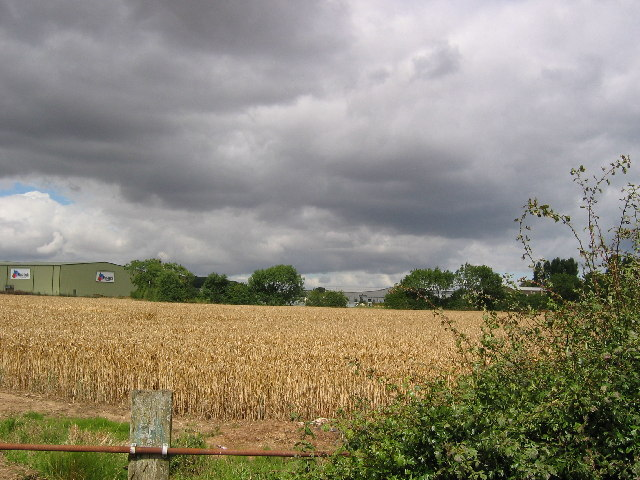
Catfoss Industrial Estate

The site is now used by various businesses and is called the Catfoss Industrial Estate.
