= No. 132 (Coastal) Operational Training Unit RAF =

Former Royal Air Force Coastal Command Operational Training Unit

No. 132 (Coastal) Operational Training Unit
- Active: 24 November 1942 - 15 May 1946
- Disbanded: 15 May 1946
- Country: United Kingdom
- Branch: Royal Air Force
- Type: Operational Training Unit
- Role: Aircrew Training
- Part of: RAF Coastal Command; *No. 17 Group RAF
- Garrison/HQ: RAF East Fortune

Insignia
- Identification Markings: Nil (1942 - 1945); 9Y (1945 - 1946)

No. 132 (Coastal) Operational Training Unit RAF, was a training unit of the Royal Air Force, within No. 17 Group RAF, part of RAF Coastal Command. The unit was established during November 1942 and disbanded during May 1946.

== History ==
No. 132 (Coastal) Operational Training Unit formed on 24 November 1942 at RAF East Fortune by redesignating No. 60 Operational Training Unit RAF. It was initially equipped with Bristol Blenheim, a British light bomber, and Bristol Beaufighter, a British multi-role aircraft. The unit was tasked with pilot training for long range fighter and strike aircraft. From July 1943 it added torpedo dropping and dive bombing training. The unit was later equipped with de Havilland Mosquito, a British twin-engined, multirole combat aircraft, and provided training with these from Spring 1944. Between February and June in 1945 the unit's de Havilland Mosquito aircraft were used by No. 8 (Coastal) Operational Training Unit RAF. No. 132 (C) OTU remained operational for almost a further year before disbanding on 15 May 1946 at RAF East Fortune.

== Aircraft operated ==
No. 132 (Coastal) Operational Training Unit RAF was equipped with numerous types and variants of aircraft:

- Bristol Blenheim I, IV & V light bomber
- Bristol Beaufort I, II & IIA torpedo bomber
- Bristol Beaufighter I, II, VI, X & XI multi role aircraft
- Westland Lysander II army co-operation and liaison aircraft
- de Havilland Tiger Moth II biplane trainer aircraft
- Miles Magister basic trainer aircraft
- Supermarine Spitfire VB fighter aircraft
- Miles Martinet I target tug aircraft
- Airspeed Oxford II trainer aircraft
- de Havilland Mosquito II & III multirole combat aircraft
- Bristol Buckmaster I advanced training aircraft

== See also ==
- List of Royal Air Force Operational Training Units
