= RAF Turnberry =

Former military airfield in Ayrshire, Scotland

RAF Turnberry
- South Ayrshire in Scotland

Site information
- Type: Royal Air Force station
- Owner: Air Ministry
- Operator: Royal Flying Corps; Royal Air Force
- Controlled by: RAF Coastal Command

Location
- Coordinates: 55°19′24″N 4°49′49″W

Site history
- Built: 1917; 1940
- In use: 1917-1919; 1940-1945
- Battles/wars: First World War; European theatre of World War II

Garrison information
- Occupants: 1 Fighting School (North-West Area); No. 618 Squadron RAF

Airfield information
- Elevation: 11 metres (36 ft) AMSL
Runways
Direction	Length and surface
00/00	Concrete/Tarmac
00/00	Concrete/Tarmac
00/00	Concrete/Tarmac

RAF Turnberry was an airfield in Scotland used by the Royal Flying Corps (RFC) and the Royal Air Force (RAF) during the First World War, and again by the RAF in the Second World War. Between the two wars, the site reverted to its pre-1914 use as the Turnberry Golf Course and hotel. It reverted to this use again after the Second World War. Although there is still a disused landing strip, the site is now the Trump Turnberry.

== History ==
=== First World War ===
In WWI Turnberry housed No. 1 School of Aerial Fighting (Loch Doon, to the east, was used for a School of Aerial Gunnery). The school merged with No. 2 (Auxiliary) School of Air Gunnery, becoming No. 1 School of Aerial Fighting and Gunnery, renamed No. 1 Fighting School (North-West Area) on 29 May 1918. It provided pilots with three-week courses in the arts of aerial gunnery and combat. It was disbanded on 25 January 1919. The Turnberry Hotel was used during the war as a hospital for the wounded.

=== Inter war period ===
Following the end of the conflict, all land and property requisitioned for military purposes was returned to civilian ownership. Golf courses 1 and 2 were rebuilt and renamed "Ailsa" and "Arran". A memorial honouring lost airmen at Turnberry was erected on the hill overlooking the 12th green of Ailsa.

=== Second World War ===
With outbreak of the Second World War, the hotel was again commissioned by the British government as a hospital, and the golf courses were requisitioned for air training for the Royal Air Force.

In November 1942 the Torpedo Training Unit RAF arrived from RAF Abbotsinch in Glasgow. Two months later in January 1943 it became No. 1 Torpedo Training Unit RAF, and kept that name until May 1944.

RAF Coastal Command based Consolidated Liberators there for anti-submarine patrols over the Atlantic. The base was also used for training Bristol Beaufighter and Bristol Beaufort crews. Testing of Barnes Wallis's "Highball" bouncing bomb was also performed by 618 Squadron, flying from Turnberry. As Turnberry hotel was used as a Royal Navy hospital, as many as 200 patients died at the base. In 1943, Bruce Forsyth's older brother John, who was serving as a pilot in the RAF, was killed during a training exercise at the base.

The following units were based at Turnberry:

- No. 5 Operational Training Unit RAF (May - December 1942)
- No. 10 Gliding School RAF (May 1945 - January 1948)
- No. 254 Squadron RAF
- Coastal Command Flying Instructors School RAF (June - October 1945) became Coastal Command Instructors School RAF (October - November 1945)
