= No. 236 Operational Conversion Unit RAF =

Operational Training Unit of the Royal Air Force

No. 236 Operational Conversion Unit RAF
- Active: 1939–1992
- Country: United Kingdom
- Branch: Royal Air Force
- Role: Maritime Reconnaissance training
- Last station: RAF Kinloss

No. 236 Operational Conversion Unit was a Royal Air Force Operational Conversion Unit which was active between 1947 and 1992 and formed by re-numbering and merging different units.

== No. 236 OCU ==
The conversion unit was formed at RAF Kinloss on 31 July 1947 and operated a variety of aircraft including Avro Lancasters, Airspeed Oxfords and Bristol Beaufighters until 30 September 1956 when it was disbanded for the first time to become the Maritime Operational Training Unit on 30 September 1956.

The MOTU was formed by the merger of No. 236 OCU and No. 1 Maritime Reconnaissance School at Kinloss and operated Avro Shackletons and Nimrods until 1 July 1970 at St Mawgan.

236 OCU reformed at RAF St Mawgan on 1 July 1970 operating Hawker Siddeley Nimrods borrowed from No. 42 Squadron RAF until the unit was disbanded on 30 September 1992 at Kinloss to become No. 42 (Reserve) Squadron, the Nimrod Operational Conversion Unit

History of No. 1 Maritime Reconnaissance School (1 MRS)

The school was formed on 1 June 1951 at St Mawgan as the School of Maritime Reconnaissance and later renamed to 1 MRS operating Airspeed Oxfords, Lancasters and Avro Ansons until 30 September 1956 at St Mawgan.

== Previous identities ==
The unit was initially No. 11 Group Pool which was formed on 14 August 1939 just before the start of the Second World War at RAF Andover operating Hawker Hurricanes, Miles Mentors and Airspeed Oxfords until 6 March 1940 when at RAF Sutton Bridge it was disbanded and became No. 6 Operational Training Unit RAF.

The OTU operated Gloster Gladiators, Miles Masters and Fairey Battles until 1 November 1940 when the unit became No. 56 OTU.

However No. 6 OTU was reformed at Andover on 1 June 1941 by redesignating No. 2 School of Army Co-operation operating Bristol Blenheims for a short time until 18 July 1941 when the unit became No. 42 OTU.

No. 6 OTU reformed for the last time on 19 July 1941 at RAF Thornaby again operating a wide variety of aircraft including Lockheed Hudsons, de Havilland Tiger Moths and Bristol Buckmasters until 31 July 1947 when at Kinloss the unit was disbanded and became No. 236 OCU.

== See also ==
- List of conversion units of the Royal Air Force
