= St Michael's Church, Rudbaxton =

Church in Pembrokeshire, Wales

Coordinates: 51.846°N 4.961°W

St Michael's Church
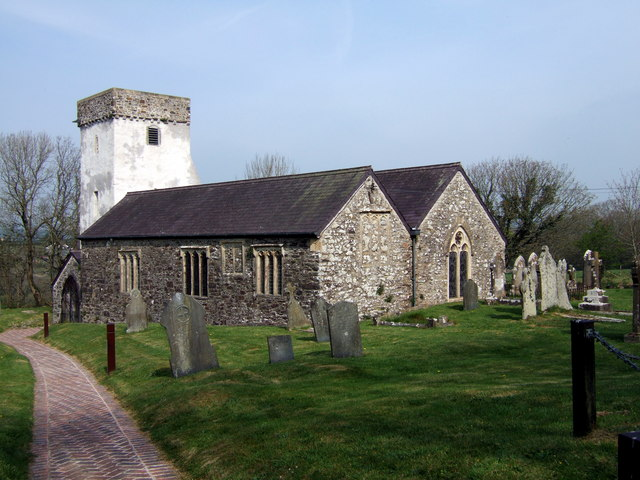
- St Michael's Church, Rudbaxton

- Location in Pembrokeshire
- Country: Wales
- Denomination: Church in Wales

History
- Dedication: St Michael

Architecture
- Heritage designation: Grade I
- Architectural type: Church

St Michael's Church is a Grade I listed building and parish church in the community and parish of Rudbaxton in Pembrokeshire, Wales. The building dates from the 15th century, and has a 12th-century font. It was listed on 1 March 1963 as a fine example of a substantial mediaeval double-nave church with important memorials.

== Parish history ==
The ancient parish of Rudbaxton was in the hundred of Dungleddy, a corruption of the Welsh for two Cleddau, referring to the Eastern and Western Cleddau rivers, which form part of the parish boundary. It appeared as Redbaxton on a 1578 parish map of Pembrokeshire. The Haverfordwest to Fishguard turnpike (now the A40) ran through the western half of the parish. Once entirely rural and agricultural, the parish now includes the northeastern part of the expanding county town of Haverfordwest. There were two chapels of ease in the parish, dedicated to St Margaret and St Catherine, but both were in ruins before the 1830s. The former parish of Rudbaxton is now in the combined parish of Daugleddau in the Diocese of St Davids.

Opposite the church is Rudbaxton Rath, the remains of a prehistoric fortification whose origins are obscure.

== Church ==
The earliest record of a church on the site was made by Wizo, one-time lord of Wiston, in a grant to the Knights Hospitallers of St John of Jerusalem in the 12th century, referring to it as Ecclesia Rudepagstona. Before it was dedicated to St Michael, a church on the site was dedicated to St Madoc. A royal commission in 1920 listed the church as having 13th century origins with a later added aisle and a two-storey tower with 24 stairs, and noted that a spring outside the churchyard was named St Madoc's Well.

=== Structure ===
The parish church of St Michael was originally established prior to the fifteenth century (there is a 12th-century font), but the present building, built of rubble stone with slate roofing, retains some late-15th or early-16th century features. The building was restored "from a state of ruin" by the rector in the 19th century. The tower has a vaulted base. The nave is probably earlier than the chancel, the arch of which, along with the roofs, was replaced in 1845 by Ewan Christian.

In 1892, the church was further restored by R. G. Pinder of Bournemouth, who replaced all the roofs and many of the fittings, bringing the building to its present state whilst retaining many parts of the earlier structures. The internal walls are plastered and painted. The tower was lime-rendered in 2000.

=== Fittings ===
The oak pulpit is 20th century. The font, rectangular and scalloped with a round base, is 12th century. The 1892 renovation added simple pine pews to the nave and chancel; the pews in the aisle are earlier, grained wood. Several windows have stained or coloured glass fitted in the 19th, 20th and 21st centuries.

=== Memorials ===
==== Howard ====
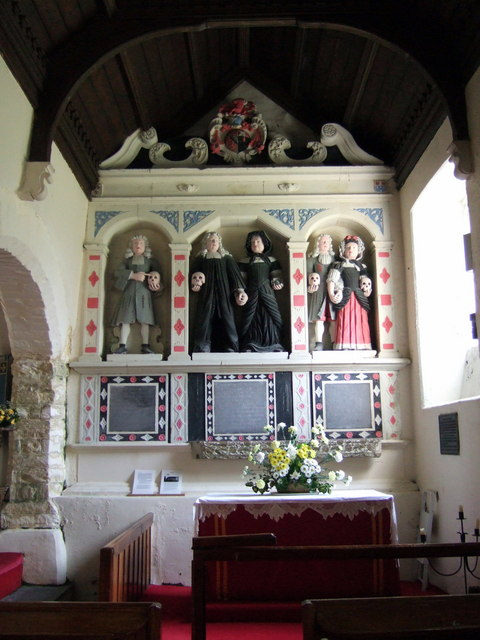
Howard Memorial

There is a significant monument to the local Howard family, probably commissioned by Joanna, wife of the Reverend James Howard in 1685 and depicting several family members and described as one of the finest memorials in the county. Pevsner describes it as "splendidly large" and notes that the carved figures have no parallels in Pembrokeshire, suggesting that they may have been imported from Bristol. The authors criticise the modern repainting, undertaken "without research as to the original scheme".

==== Picton ====
Lieutenant-General Sir Thomas Picton, the most senior officer to die at the Battle of Waterloo, has a memorial slab in the chancel floor and a Romanesque bust in the wall. Picton was born in Haverfordwest in 1758, and grew up at Poyston Hall in the parish. Other Pictons are memorialised in the church, including Thomas's brother John, also a general in the army, who is buried in the church, and another General Picton, William, who died in 1811 and was buried in the family vault in St George's, Hanover Square. John Picton's memorial is framed by a lion, a shield and banners, although Pevsner notes that the sculptor, Daniel Mainwaring of Carmarthen, had "clearly never seen a lion".

==== Others ====
There are numerous other 18th, 19th and 20th century monuments and memorials dating from 1665 to 1909 to local people from servant to architect to archbishop, this last being a brass plate to William Laud, who was rector from 1622 to 1626, during his time as Bishop of St Davids. There is a plaque remembering six parishioners who lost their lives during World War I.
