= Crundale =

Crundale may refer to:

- Crundale, Kent, a village and civil parish in the Ashford District of Kent, England
- Crundale, Pembrokeshire, Wales
