= Rudbaxton Rath =

Hillfort in Pembrokeshire, Wales

Coordinates: 51.83191°N 4.92545°W

- The Rath
- Interactive map of Rudbaxton Rath
- Type: Hillfort
- Location: Rudbaxton, Pembrokeshire, Wales
- Region: Wales

History
- Built: Iron Age

Site notes
- Condition: Earthworks

Location in Pembrokeshire

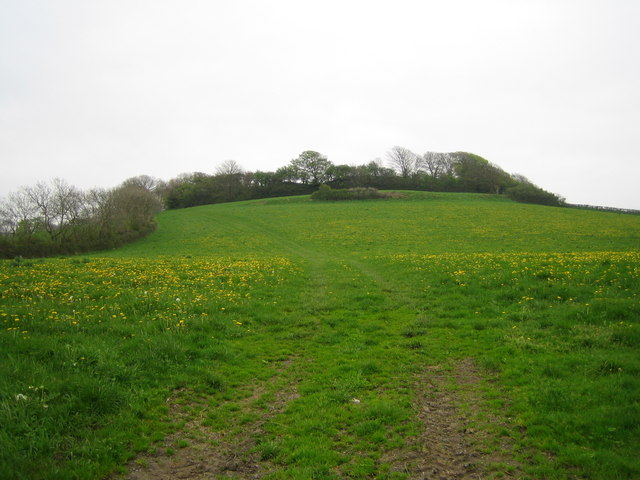
Rudbaxton Rath viewed from Tori-gwddwg Hill

Rudbaxton Rath is a ring-shaped enclosure together with a ringed keep in the parish of Rudbaxton, Pembrokeshire, Wales. It is situated roughly 1.54 km northeast of Crundale and about 2.39 km east of Haverfordwest Aerodrome.

It is the remains of an Iron Age defensive ringfort, hillfort or castle, probably made of timber. At the site are the remains of light earthwork. The nearly circular interior area is surrounded by a counterscarp and measures around 100 metres north to south by 95 metres east to west. A possible entrance has been identified at the north side. There is a rampart that is around 3 metres high. Within the western rampart an elliptical enclosure can be seen, measuring (north-northwest to south-southeast) roughly 50 metres by 32 metres.

Artefacts at the site include unspecified armour and two rings made of iron approximately 20 cm across. Two twisted iron rings were discovered about 20 cm in diameter. It is possible that they were once torcs. Also found at the site is a half-scale model of a human hand, also made of iron. This hand may be Roman or Iron Age.

Exterior to the enclosure at the east are the remains of a medieval chapel.

The site is a scheduled monument.
