= Gage Sise =

Officer in the Royal New Zealand Air Force

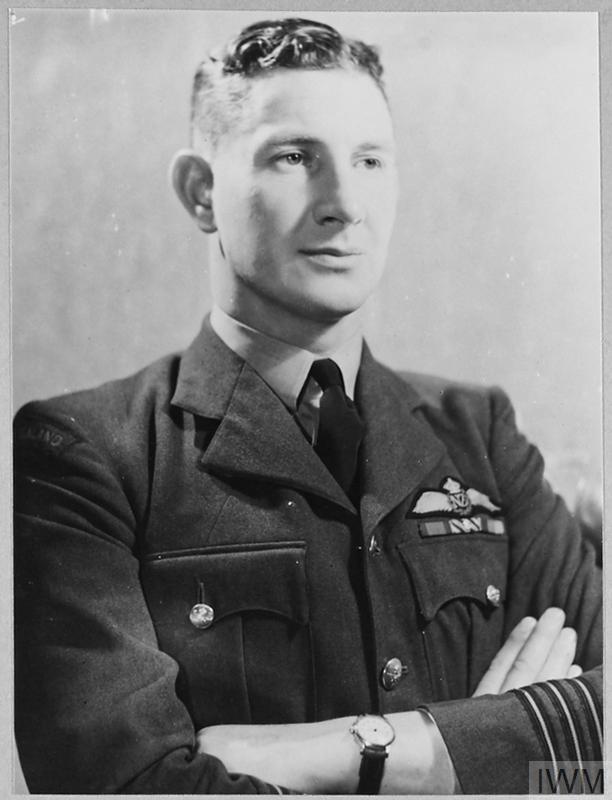
- Portrait of Sise, 1944
- Born: 21 January 1917; Dunedin, New Zealand
- Died: 23 December 2003 (aged 86); Melbourne, Australia
- Military career
- Allegiance: New Zealand
- Branch: Royal New Zealand Air Force; Royal Air Force
- Service years: 1940–1947 (RNZAF); 1947–1967 (RAF)
- Rank: Group Captain
- Commands: No. 254 Squadron (1943); No. 248 Squadron (1944–1945); RAF Church Fenton
- Conflicts: Second World War; Cold War
- Awards: Distinguished Service Order & Bar; Distinguished Flying Cross & Bar

Gage Darwent Sise DSO & Bar, DFC & Bar (21 January 1917 – 23 December 2003) was an officer of the Royal New Zealand Air Force (RNZAF) during the Second World War. A recipient of multiple gallantry awards, he was one of the most decorated New Zealanders to have flown in Coastal Command.

From Dunedin, Sise joined the RNZAF on the outbreak of the Second World War and once his training was completed was sent to the United Kingdom to serve with the Royal Air Force (RAF). Posted to Coastal Command's No. 254 Squadron, he flew several anti-shipping sorties and from late 1942 was involved in the first operations conducted by the North Coates Strike Wing. He later commanded No. 254 Squadron for a time in 1943 and from July 1944 to March 1945 was leader of No. 248 Squadron. He was a specialist in anti-shipping operations and was Coastal Command's leading 'ship-buster'. After the war, he formally transferred to the RAF and served until 1967, when he retired as a group captain. He returned to New Zealand and settled in Wānaka before relocating to Melbourne, in Australia, where he died in 2003 at the age of 86.

== Early life ==
Gage Darwent "Bill" Sise was born in Dunedin, New Zealand, on 21 January 1917. He was educated at Otago Boys' High School and proceeded to study accounting at the University of Otago. He joined the civil reserve of pilots in 1938 but had yet to receive formal pilot training by the time of the outbreak of the Second World War.

== Second World War ==
Sise joined the Royal New Zealand Air Force (RNZAF) in October 1939. After initial training at Taieri Aerodrome, he completed his training at the RNZAF base at Wigram, from where he passed out with his 'wings' in May 1940. Along with several other RNZAF flying personnel, he was sent to the United Kingdom to serve with the Royal Air Force (RAF).

After his arrival in the United Kingdom, Sise was granted a commission as a pilot officer and posted to No. 254 Squadron, which operated Bristol Blenheim heavy fighters from Dyce. On his first orientation flight after his arrival, he crashed his Blenheim after undershooting his landing. His concerns that he would be immediately posted away were unfounded, and he went on to fly several sorties with the squadron. On one of these, carried out in January 1941, Sise was patrolling near Bergen, in Norway, and attacked a merchantman but was intercepted by a Messerschmitt Bf 109 fighter. He was able to evade his pursuer and return safely to his base.

=== Anti-shipping campaign ===
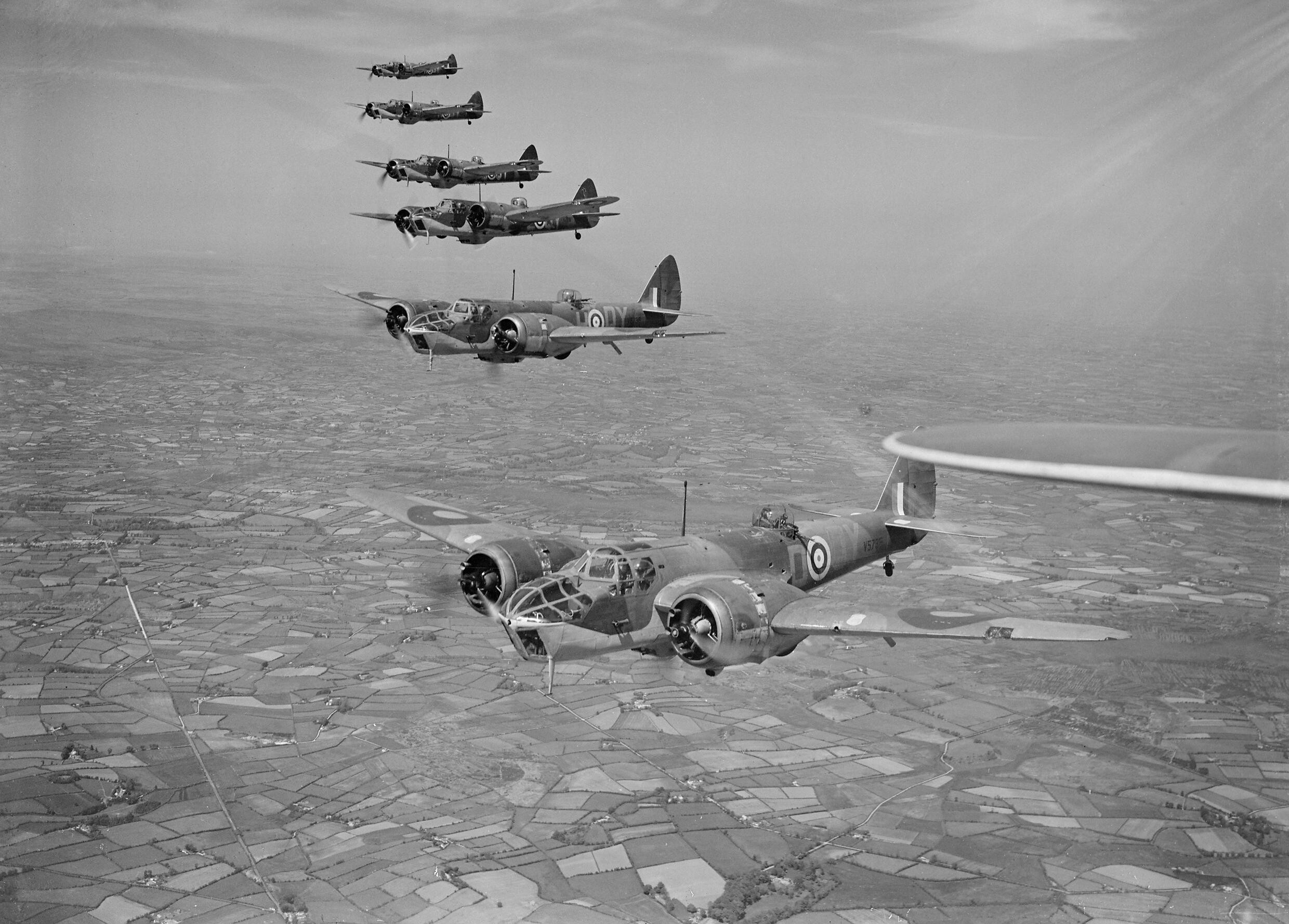
Bristol Blenheims of No. 254 Squadron, flying over Northern Ireland in May 1941

By 1942, superior aircraft, in the form of the Bristol Beaufighter heavy fighter, were becoming available to the RAF's Coastal Command. Based on experience gained in the Mediterranean, new tactics were devised for attacking shipping and involved the use of large formations of 30 or more aircraft. This led to the formation of strike wings. The first of these was the North Coates Strike Wing, which included Sise's No. 254 Squadron, alongside No. 236 Squadron.

Sise, now in the rank of squadron leader, was part of the strike wing's first sortie, carried out on 20 November 1942. Flying one of the nine torpedo-equipped aircraft and accompanied by thirteen aircraft of No. 236 Squadron, the North Coates Strike Wing was tasked with attacking a large shipping convoy traversing the Dutch coast. A fighter escort failed to appear and together with poor weather and poor coordination between the Beaufighters, affected the sortie. Sise attacked a merchantman but his Beaufighter was damaged by flak from escorting ships. He was also intercepted by German fighters but was able to evade these and make a crash landing along the Essex coast. The poor results of the sortie saw Strike Wing operations deferred while tactics were revised and the constituent squadrons underwent further training. However, in recognition of his exploits on 20 November, Sise was awarded the Distinguished Flying Cross (DFC). This was formally announced in February 1943.

=== Squadron command ===
In April 1943, No. 254 Squadron's commanding officer, Wing Commander R. Mack, was lost on operations. Sise took command of the squadron in an acting capacity until a permanent replacement was found. On 18 April 1943, when the North Coates Strike Wing carried out its first sortie of the year, Sise led a contingent of torpedo-carrying Beaufighters, accompanied by twelve Beaufighters operating in an anti-flak role, to the Dutch coastline to attack an armed shipping convoy. A 5,000 ton collier was sunk and four escort vessels damaged, all without loss to the RAF aircraft involved. Another successful sortie was carried later in the month, with two merchant ships sunk. Sise was then rested from operations. In recognition of his service with, and subsequent leadership of, No. 254 Squadron, Sise was awarded the Distinguished Service Order in July 1943.

In July 1944, after a period of service at the headquarters of Coastal Command, Sise, now holding the rank of wing commander, was appointed to command of No. 248 Squadron. This operated de Havilland Mosquito heavy fighters from Portreath into the Bay of Biscay. Two months later it was transferred to Banff to join Coastal Command's strike wing based there and tasked with anti-shipping operations in Norwegian waters as part of the Banff Strike Wing. From 14 September, it carried out numerous anti-shipping sorties, including to Gironde Estuary in which two minesweepers were sunk. Sise was awarded a Bar to his DFC in late September and the citation, published in The London Gazette, read:

Within recent weeks, Wing Commander Sise has participated in a number of sorties during which several enemy ships of varying type have been sunk and others damaged. Much of the success achieved can be attributed to this officer's great skill, inspiring leadership and great determination.

— London Gazette, No. 36723, 29 September 1944

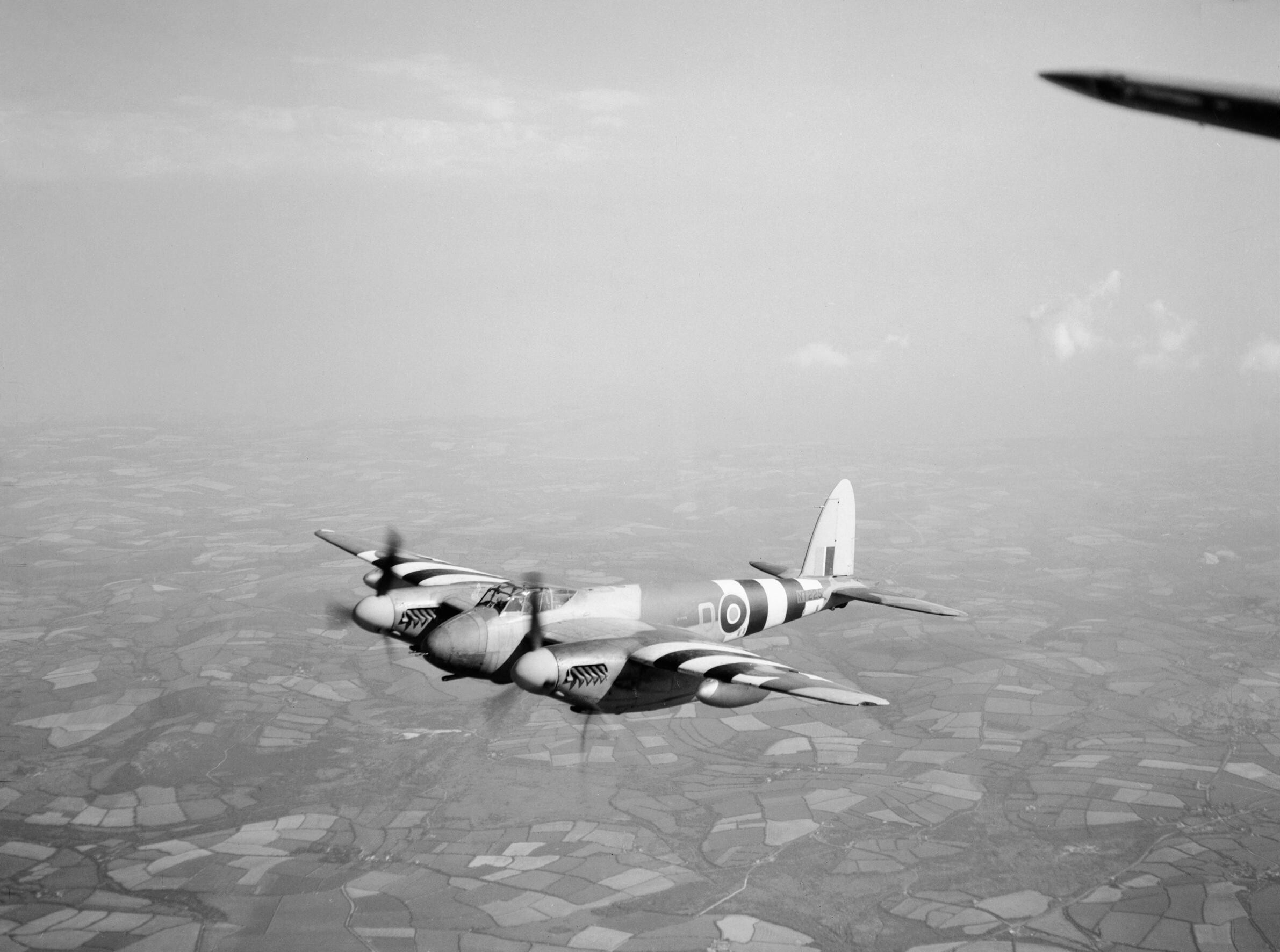
A de Havilland Mosquito flying from Portreath in August 1944

Continuing to be involved in strike wing operations, Sise was the wing leader for operations to Florø Harbour and Nord Gulen fjord in Norway, both of which resulted in several ships being sunk or damaged. The squadron's Mosquitos were now utilising rocket projectiles in its operations and beginning to attack port infrastructure in Norway. He was awarded a Bar to his DSO with the citation, published on 19 January 1945, reading:

This officer has displayed great gallantry in operations against the enemy. He is a brilliant leader whose personal example and untiring efforts have done much towards raising his squadron to the highest standard of fighting efficiency. Since ibeing awarded a bar to the Distinguished Flying Cross, he has led formations of aircraft in several attacks on enemy shipping. In November, 1944, Wing Commander Sise participated in an attack on shipping in Floro Harbour. Much anti-aircraft fire was encountered. Wing Commander Sise's aircraft was hit. One engine caught fire but he pressed home his attack and afterwards flew his damaged aircraft to base. Some days later this officer led a very large formation of aircraft in an operation off Aalsund. His great skill and forceful leadership played a large part in the success of the operation.

— London Gazette, No. 36899, 19 January 1945

Sise was rested from operations in March, and was appointed commander of the RAF station at Mount Farm. The final months of his wartime service were spent on instructing duties at an Operational Training Unit at Haverfordwest and then Denson. He ended the war having been involved with over 150 operational sorties and according to the Official History of New Zealanders in the Royal Air Force, was "regarded as Coastal Command's leading ‘ship-buster’". Being a two-time recipient of both the DSO and DFC, he was one of the most decorated New Zealanders to have flown for Coastal Command.

== Postwar career ==
Remaining in military service in the postwar period, Sise formally transferred from the RNZAF to the RAF in July 1947 and was granted a permanent commission as a squadron leader. In the interim he had returned to New Zealand for a short furlough although, due to an accident, he spent part of it in hospital. In July 1952, he was promoted to wing commander. In 1958 he was appointed the commander of Church Fenton, a fighter station near York. He was promoted to group captain in July 1958. He retired at this rank in early 1967.

== Later life ==
Sise returned to New Zealand and initially lived in Dunedin before settling in Wānaka. He returned to the United Kingdom for the unveiling on 28 September 1989 at Banff of a memorial to the Banff Strike Wing. His final years were spent in Australia, living in Melbourne, the same city in which his son resided. He died in Vermont South on 23 December 2003.
