= RAF Limavady =

Former Royal Air Force station in County Londonderry, Northern Ireland

RAF Limavady RNAS Limavady
- Limavady Aerodrome
- Limavady, County Londonderry in Northern Ireland

Site information
- Type: Royal Air Force satellite station
- Owner: Air Ministry; Admiralty
- Operator: Royal Air Force; Royal Navy
- Controlled by: RAF Coastal Command * No. 15 Group RAF * No. 17 (T) Group RAF; Fleet Air Arm
- Condition: Disused

Location
- Shown within Northern Ireland RAF Limavady (the United Kingdom)
- Coordinates: 55°04′23″N 006°56′15″W

Site history
- Built: 1940
- In use: 1940 - August 1945
- Fate: Industry
- Battles/wars: European theatre of World War II; Cold War

Airfield information
- Elevation: 20 metres (66 ft) AMSL
Runways
Direction	Length and surface
00/18	1,069 yards (977 m) x 50 yards (46 m) Concrete/Tarmac
10/28	1,530 yards (1,399 m) x 50 yards (46 m) Concrete/Tarmac
00/00	1,370 yards (1,253 m) x 50 yards (46 m) Concrete/Tarmac
- Source: Royal Navy Research Archive

Royal Air Force Limavady, or more simply RAF Limavady, is a former Royal Air Force satellite station, also known as Aghanloo airfield, near the city of Derry, Northern Ireland.

== History ==
The station was built in 1940 during the Second World War. The airfield was part of RAF Coastal Command and was important in the fight against U-boats in the Atlantic Ocean.

=== Royal Navy ===
RAF Limavady was also used by the Fleet Air Arm. Lodger facilities were granted during 1944, but it was later transferred to the Admiralty from No. 15 Group RAF on loan from 1 December 1945 and known as Royal Naval Air Station Limavady, or more simply RNAS Limavady. 825 Naval Air Squadron was based at RNAS Limavady after moving from RNAS Machrihanish, Argyll and Bute, on 29 September 1943, operating with Fairey Swordfish II and Hawker Sea Hurricane Mk.IIc aircraft before departing for RAF Mullaghmore in November 1943. During 1944, 811 Naval Air Squadron operated from the airfield on several occasions after disembarking from the escort carriers HMS Biter and HMS Vindex, flying Fairey Swordfish II and Grumman Martlet IV aircraft. 846 and 850 Naval Air Squadrons were also stationed at RNAS Limavady during 1944, operating Grumman Avenger Mk II and Grumman Wildcat Mk IV aircraft.

Following the war, the airfield was retained on a war reserve basis under Admiralty control. In early 1950, aircraft of 737 Naval Air Squadron, part of the Operational Flying Training School at RNAS Eglinton, used RNAS Limavady for Airfield Dummy Deck Landing training with Supermarine Seafire and Fairey Firefly aircraft during the period of the Korean War.

== Units ==
Sqn	Aircraft	Joined	Departed	From → To	Notes
48	Avro Anson I Bristol Beaufort I Lockheed Hudson V/III	16 July 1940	20 October 1941	RAF Hooton Park; RAF Stornoway; RAF Skitten	On detachment initially from RAF Hooton Park then squadron moved to RAF Stornoway then on to RAF Skitten.
53	Lockheed Hudson V	July 1941	February 1942	RAF Bircham Newton → RAF St Eval	On detachment then squadron moved to RAF St Eval and continued its detachment.
143	Bristol Blenheim IV	23 April 1942	11 June 1942	RAF Aldergrove → RAF Thorney Island	Squadron move.
153	Boulton Paul Defiant I Bristol Beaufighter IF	October 1941	December 1942	RAF Ballyhalbert → RAF Portreath	On detachment.
172	Vickers Wellington XIV	1 September 1944	4 June 1945	RAF Chivenor → DB	Squadron disbanded.
221	Vickers Wellington IC	November 1940	25 December 1941	RAF Bircham Newton → RAF Docking	On detachment from RAF Bircham Newton then from RAF Reykjavik.
224	Lockheed Hudson II	15 April 1941	20 December 1941	RAF Leuchars → RAF St Eval	Squadron move.
245 (Northern Rhodesian)	Hawker Hurricane I	20 July 1940	1 September 1941	RAF Aldergrove → RAF Chilbolton	On detachment.
281	Supermarine Sea Otter	31 March 1941	13 August 1945	RAF Mullaghmore → RAF Ballykelly	Squadron move.
304	Vickers Wellington XIII	21 September 1944	6 March 1945	RAF Benbecula → RAF St Eval	On detachment.
407	Vickers Wellington XI	29 January 1944	28 April 1944	RAF Chivenor → RAF Chivenor	Squadron move.
500 (County of Kent) AAF	Bristol Blenheim IV	30 May 1941	22 March 1942	RAF Bircham Newton → RAF Stornoway	On detachment then squadron move.
502 (Ulster) AAF	Armstrong Whitworth Whitley V	27 January 1941	10 January 1942	RAF Aldergrove → RAF Bircham Newton	Squadron move.
612 (County of Aberdeen) AAF	Armstrong Whitworth Whitley V	1 April 1941	15 December 1941	RAF Wick → RAF Reykjavik	On detachment then squadron move.
811 Naval Air Squadron		1944	1944		
819 Naval Air Squadron					
825 Naval Air Squadron		1944	1944		
846 Naval Air Squadron		1944	1944		
850 Naval Air Squadron		1944	1944		

The following units were also here at some point:

- No. 7 (Coastal) Operational Training Unit RAF (April 1942 - May 1944)
- No. 22 Air Crew Holding Unit
- No. 2754 Squadron RAF Regiment
- Loran Training Unit RAF (April 1945) became Coastal Command Anti U-Boat Devices School RAF (April - August 1945)

During the Second World War the airfield was further used by the Fleet Air Arm when it was known as RNAS Limavady until 1958 when it was finally sold off.

== Current use ==
After it was vacated by the military, the site was partly converted into an industrial estate with the rest returning to agricultural purposes. The runways and taxiways can still be seen from aerial imagery.
