= 850 Naval Air Squadron =

Defunct flying squadron of the Royal Navy's Fleet Air Arm

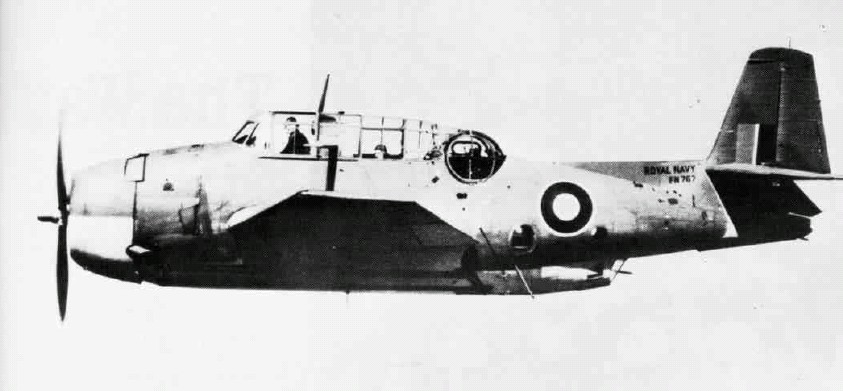
- A Fleet Air Arm Grumman Avenger Mk.I; an example of the type used by 850 NAS
- Active: 1943; 1943–1944
- Disbanded: 24 December 1944
- Country: United Kingdom
- Branch: Royal Navy
- Type: Torpedo Bomber Reconnaissance squadron
- Role: Carrier-based: anti-submarine warfare (ASW); anti-surface warfare (ASuW)
- Size: twelve aircraft
- Part of: Fleet Air Arm
- Engagements: World War II: European theatre of World War II; Battle of the Atlantic
- Battle honours: Normandy 1944; Atlantic 1944

Insignia
- Identification symbol: single letters (Avenger); 4A+ (Avenger December 1943); single letters (Wildcat)

Aircraft flown
- Bomber: Grumman Avenger
- Fighter: Grumman Wildcat

850 Naval Air Squadron (850 NAS), sometimes referred to as 850 Squadron, was a Fleet Air Arm (FAA) naval air squadron of the United Kingdom’s Royal Navy (RN). It was last operational with the Royal Navy during the Second World War operating Grumman Avenger torpedo bomber aircraft and Grumman Wildcat fighter aircraft.

Intended to be formed to operate Curtiss Seamew as a long-range reconnaissance squadron at the start of 1943, it actually formed in the autumn of that year in the United States, before emarking in an escort carrier for passage across the Atlantic Ocean to the UK for operations, where it also briefly had a Grumman Wildcat fighter flight.

The squadron was reformed as 850 Squadron RAN in 1953.

== History ==
The aircrew were designated to 850 Naval Air Squadron, which was scheduled to be established at RNAS Quonset Point (HMS Asbury), the US Naval Air Station Quonset Point, Rhode Island, loaned to the Admiralty, on 1 January 1943, with the purpose of serving as a long-range reconnaissance squadron. The squadron was to be equipped with twelve Curtiss SO3C Seamew aircraft. Lieutenant J.H .Dundas, DSC, RN, was selected to lead the squadron; however, the formation was ultimately cancelled, and the squadron was officially disbanded on 31 January.

The Squadron was re-established in the United States on 1 September 1943, at the US Naval Air Station Squantum, Massachusetts, which was loaned to the Admiralty from September 1943, operating as Royal Naval Air Station Squantum. The squadron was commanded by Lieutenant Commander(A)(P) A.P. Boddani-Whetham, DSC, RN, and was equipped with twelve Grumman Tarpon Mk I aircraft.

The Grumman Avengers provided to the FAA were supplied through Lend-Lease agreements, starting in 1943. Until January 1944, the British designation Tarpon was utilised. The Tarpon Mk I (later known as the Avenger Mk I) served as the British counterpart to the United States Navy's TBF-1. Following the familiarisation with the aircraft and equipment, the squadron commenced rigorous training to ready itself for active service. The twelve-week preparation phase encompassed various facets of the operations of torpedo bomber reconnaissance squadrons, incorporating navigation drills, low-altitude flying, formation flying, combat strategies, as well as techniques for torpedo and depth charge attacks. Deck landing training was done aboard the USS Charger.

At the conclusion of the work-up, the squadron made preparations for a cross-country journey from Squantum to Vancouver, British Columbia, located on Canada's west coast, in anticipation of boarding an Escort Carrier. The squadron traversed the United States, making overnight stops in Detroit, Minneapolis, North Dakota, Montana, and Washington State before arriving in British Columbia in December.

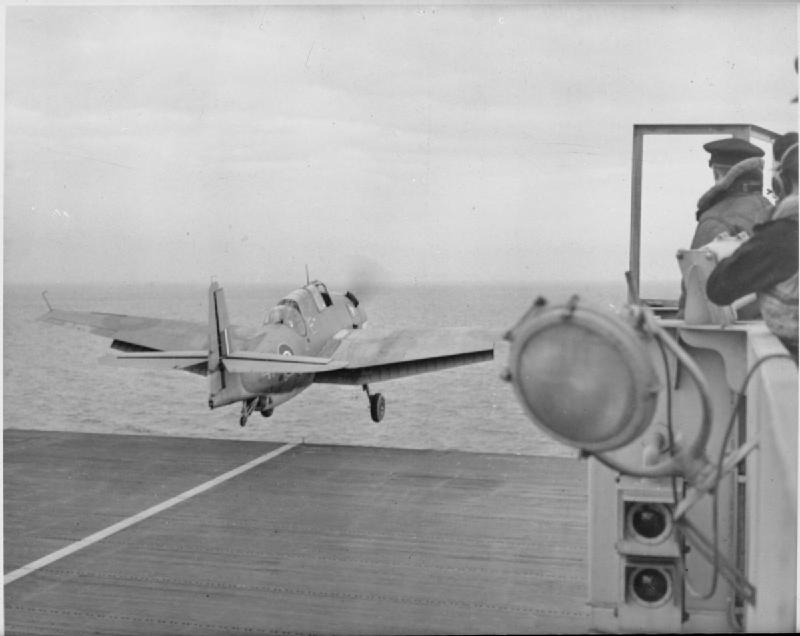
A Grumman Avenger taking off from HMS Empress

On 17 February 1944, 850 Naval Air Squadron boarded the Ruler-class escort carrier HMS Empress as the carrier set sail from Vancouver, heading towards the UK, with stops in Norfolk, Virginia and New York. Upon her arrival in New York on March 26, she joined the Liverpool-bound convoy CU.19 on the morning of 28 March. She reached Greenock on 8 April. Subsequently, the Avengers of 850 Squadron departed on 10, heading towards RNAS Lee-on-Solent (HMS Daedalus), Hampshire.

The squadron dedicated a fortnight at RNAS Lee-on-Solent prior to its assignment to collaborate with RAF Coastal Command, arriving at RAF Perranporth, Cornwall, on 16 April. From this point, the squadron conducted anti-shipping and anti-submarine missions in the English Channel and the western approaches. In conjunction with 816 and 849 Naval Air Squadrons during the Normandy landings, the squadron successfully sank one enemy merchant ship and inflicted damage on another near the Channel Islands on July 24th.

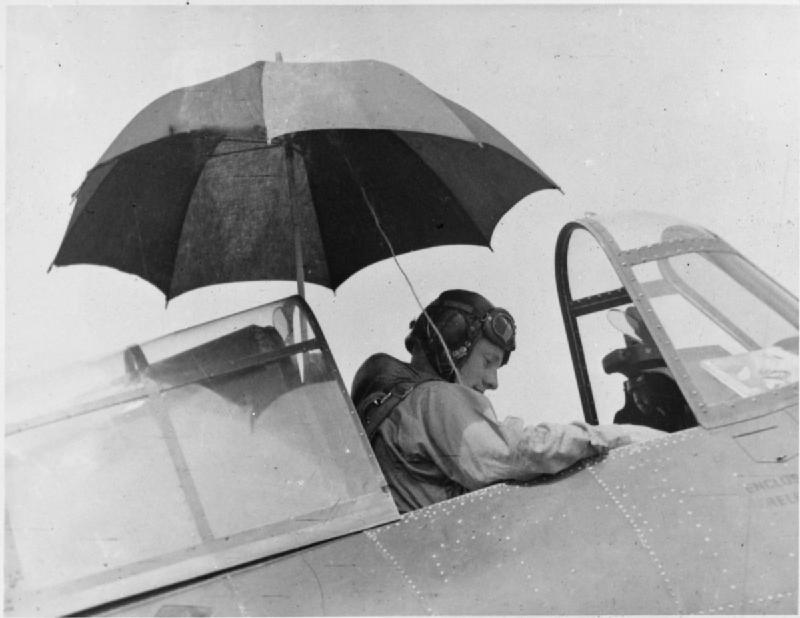
The pilot of a Grumman Wildcat, at readiness aboard HMS Fencer

On 30 July, a flight of four Grumman Wildcat Mk Vs was established at RNAS Eglinton (HMS Gannet), County Londonderry, from T' Flight of 1832 Squadron, yet it operated separately from the main contingent of 850 Squadron. From RNAS Eglinton, the flight boarded the Attacker-class escort carrier HMS Fencer on 23 September, subsequently transferring to the Nairana-class escort carrier HMS Campania on 18 October. The flight was disembarked at RNAS Machrihanish (HMS Landrail), Argyll and Bute, on 16 November; they proceeded south, making a stop at RNAS Burscough (HMS Ringtail), Lancashire, on the 29 and reaching RNAS Yeovilton (HMS Heron), Somerset, on the 30. The flight was officially disbanded on 3 December 1944.

The squadron relocated to RAF Limavady, County Londonderry, on 1 August; however, this was merely a temporary assignment, as they transferred to RNAS Maydown (HMS Shrike), County Londonderry. Anti-submarine patrols were conducted from RNAS Maydown until 6 November, at which point the squadron was once more in transit, this time to RAF Mullaghmore, County Antrim. They were officially disbanded at this air station on 24 December 1944..

== Aircraft flown ==
The squadron has flown a couple of different aircraft types:

- Grumman Avenger Mk I torpedo bomber (September 1943 - December 1944)
- Grumman Wildcat Mk V fighter aircraft (August - September 1944)
- Grumman Wildcat Mk VI fighter aircraft (August - December 1944)

== Battle honours ==
The following Battle Honours have been awarded to 850 Naval Air Squadron:

- Normandy 1944
- Atlantic 1944

== Naval air stations ==
850 Naval Air Squadron operated from a number of naval air stations of the Royal Navy in the UK and overseas, a number of Royal Air Force stations and also a Royal Navy escort carrier and other airbases overseas:

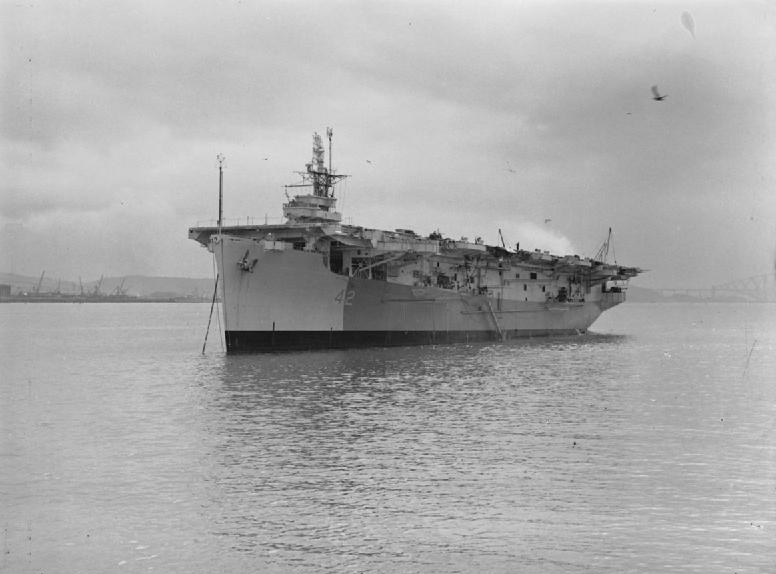
HMS Empress

- Royal Naval Air Station Quonset Point (HMS Asbury), Rhode Island, (1 - 30 January 1943)
- disbanded - (30 January 1943)
- RN Air Section Squantum, Massachusetts, (1 September - 2 December 1943)
  - RN Air Section Norfolk, Virginia, (Detachment Deck Landing Training (DLT) USS Charger 9 - 12 November 1943)
- transit - (2 - 12 December 1943)
- RCAF Station Sea Island, British Columbia, (12 December 1943 - 17 February 1944)
  - HMS Empress (DLT 19 January - 7 February 1944
- HMS Empress (17 February - 10 April 1944)
  - Naval Air Station San Diego, California, (Detachment February 1944)
- Royal Naval Air Station Lee-on-Solent (HMS Daedalus), Hampshire, (10 - 23 April 1944)
- Royal Air Force Perranporth, Cornwall, (23 April - 1 September 1944)
- Royal Air Force Limavady, County Londonderry, (1 - 13 September 1944)
- Royal Naval Air Station Maydown (HMS Shrike), County Londonderry, (13 - 26 September 1944)
- Royal Air Force Limavady, County Londonderry, (26 September - 6 November 1944)
- Royal Air Force Mullaghmore, County Antrim, (6 November - 30 December 1944)
- Royal Naval Air Station Donibristle (HMS Merlin), Fife, (aircraft) (29 December 1944)
- disbanded - (30 December 1944)

=== Fighter Flight ===
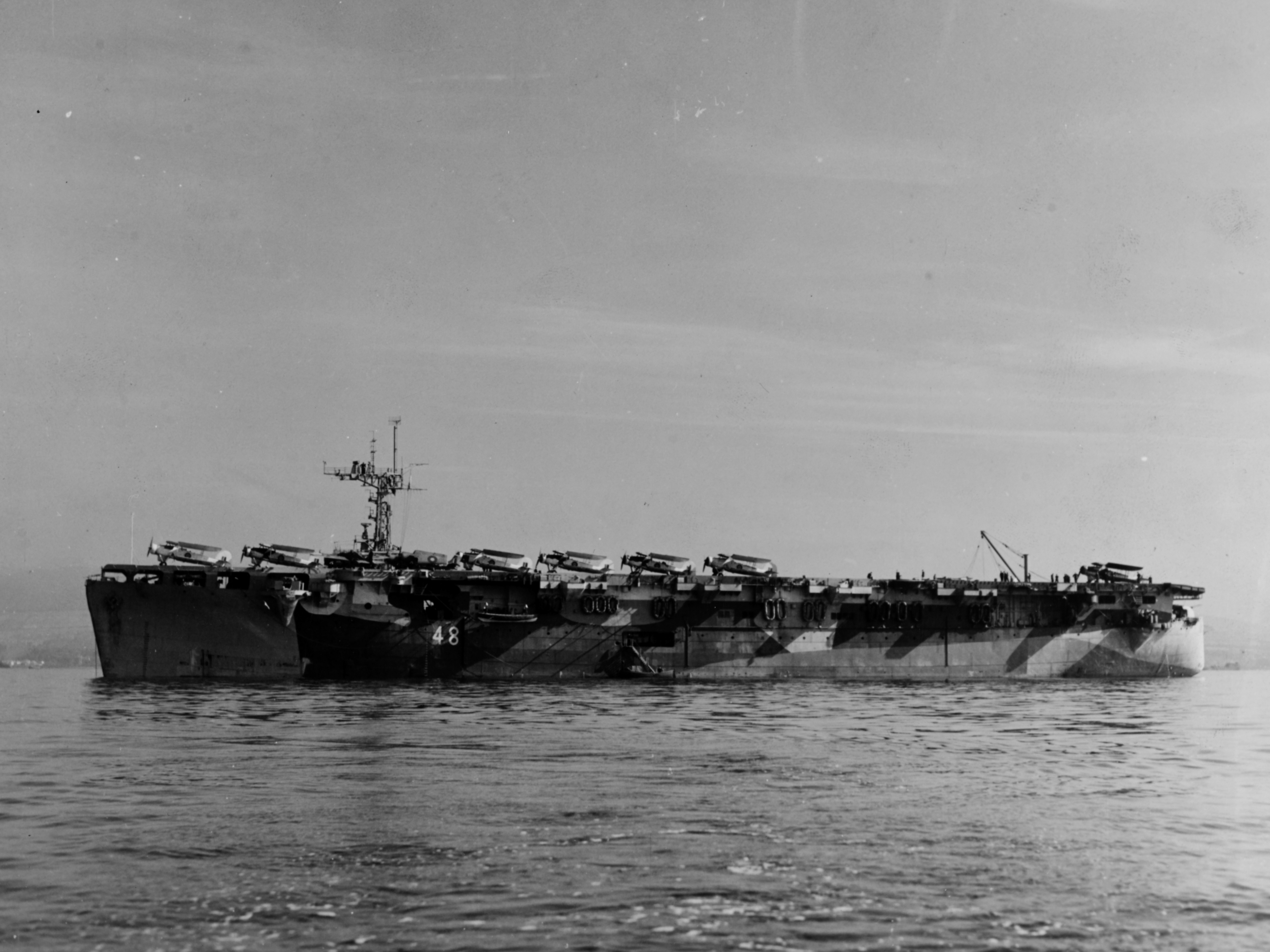
HMS Campania

- Royal Naval Air Station Eglinton (HMS Gannet), County Londonderry, (30 July - 26 September 1944)
- HMS Fencer (26 September - 18 October 1944)
- HMS Campania (18 October - 16 November 1944)
- Royal Naval Air Station Machrihanish (HMS Landrail), Argyll and Bute, (16 - 29 November 1944)
- Royal Naval Air Station Burscough (HMS Ringtail), Lancashire, (29 - 30 November 1944)
- Royal Naval Air Station Yeovilton (HMS Heron), Somerset, (30 November - 30 December 1944)
- disbanded - 3 December 1944

== Commanding officers ==
List of commanding officers of 850 Naval Air Squadron:

- Lieutenant J.H Dundas, DSC, RN, from 1 January 1943
- disbanded - 30 January 1943
- Lieutenant Commander A.P. Boddam-Whetham, DSC, RN, from 1 September 1943
- Lieutenant Commander(A) B. White, DSC, RNVR, from 28 May 1944
- Lieutenant Commander(A) F.S. Martin, RNVR, from 18 December 1944
- disbanded - 30 December 1944

Note: Abbreviation (A) signifies Air Branch of the RN or RNVR.
