= No. 248 Squadron RAF =

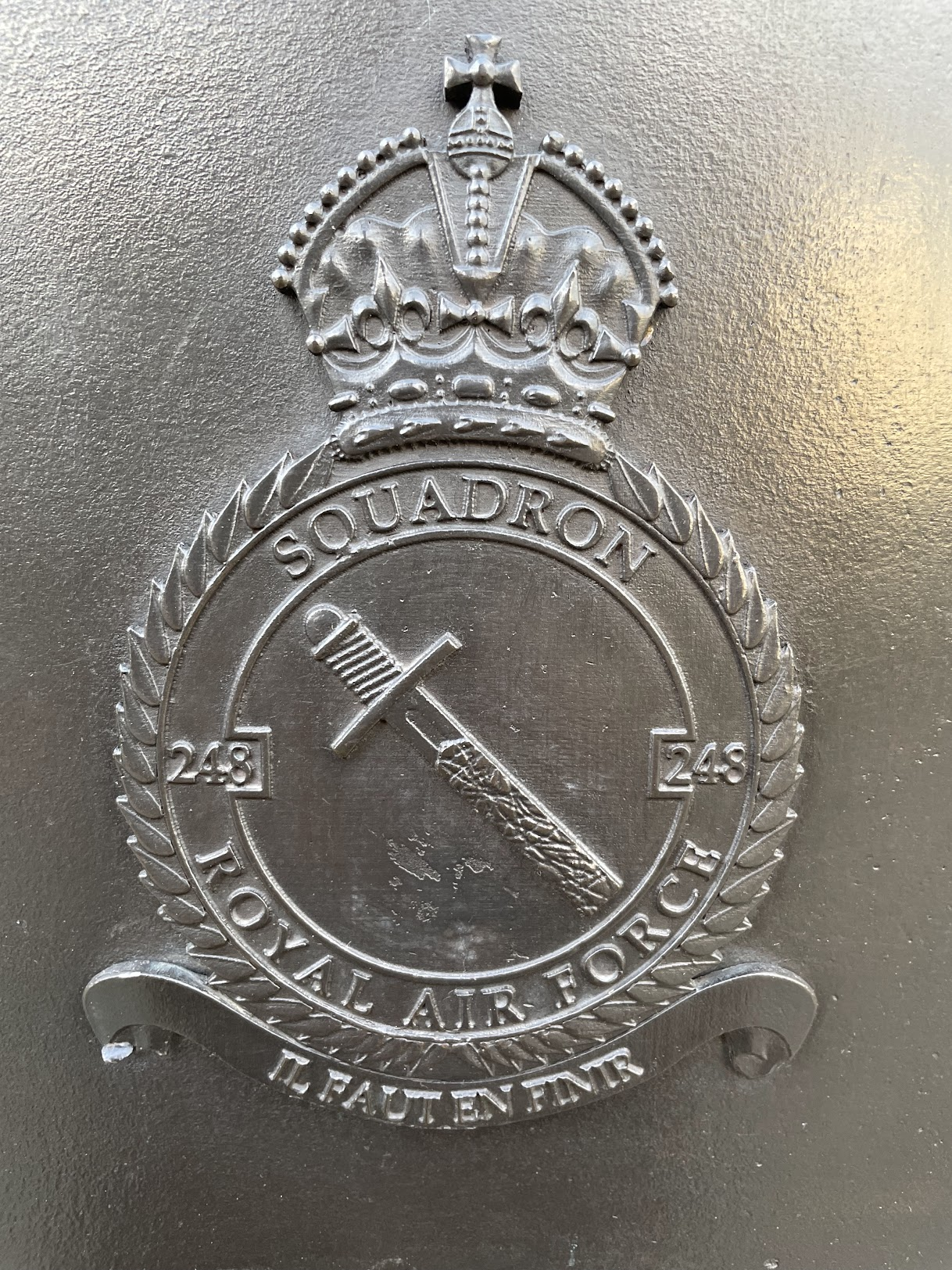
- The heraldic badge of the squadron as it appears on the Battle of Britain Monument in London.
- Active: August 1918 - 6 March 1919; 30 October 1939 – 30 September 1946
- Country: United Kingdom
- Branch: Royal Air Force
- Mottos: French: Il faut en finir ("It is necessary to make an end of it")

Insignia
- Squadron Badge heraldry: A demi-sword in bend partly withdrawn from the scabbard.
- Squadron Codes: WR (Oct 1939 - Oct 1943); DM (Oct 1943 - 1945)

No. 248 Squadron was a squadron of the Royal Air Force, active immediately after World War I, and again during World War II.

== Service history ==
=== First World War ===
248 Squadron RAF was formed at Hornsea Mere in the East Riding of Yorkshire in August 1918 by merging the seaplane flights based at Hornsea Mere (No. 404, 405 and 453 Flights). The new squadron was equipped with Short 184 and Fairey Hamble Baby floatplanes, and was employed in flying anti-submarine patrols off the Yorkshire coast until the end of the First World War in November 1918. It disbanded on 6 March 1919.

=== Second World War ===
The Squadron remained disbanded until after the outbreak of the Second World War, reforming at RAF Hendon as a Night Fighter squadron. It received its first aircraft, Bristol Blenheim IFs, a fighter modification of the twin engined light bomber in December that year. The squadron was still working up when it was transferred to Coastal Command in February 1940, swapping its Blenheim IFs for slightly more modern Blenheim IVFs and moving to RAF North Coates in Lincolnshire. It transferred back to Fighter Command on 22 April 1940, flying fighter patrols over the North Sea from RAF Dyce, Aberdeen and RAF Montrose, and returning to Coastal Command control on 20 June.

The squadron moved to RAF Sumburgh in the Shetland Islands on 31 July 1940, flying reconnaissance and anti-shipping missions off the coast of Norway until it returned to Dyce in January 1941, adding convoy escort to its reconnaissance missions, with a detachment based at RAF Wick in Caithness. In June 1941 the squadron transferred to RAF Bircham Newton in Norfolk, where it re-equipped with the Bristol Beaufighter in July, flying its first missions with the new aircraft on 14 August. It carried out convoy escort missions and strikes against shipping off the Dutch coast from Bircham Newton, while a detachment from the squadron was sent to Cornwall to carry out long-range fighter patrols over the Western Approaches between September and December that year. The squadron moved back to Dyce again in February 1942, flying patrols and escorting strikes by Bristol Beaufort torpedo bombers off Norway.

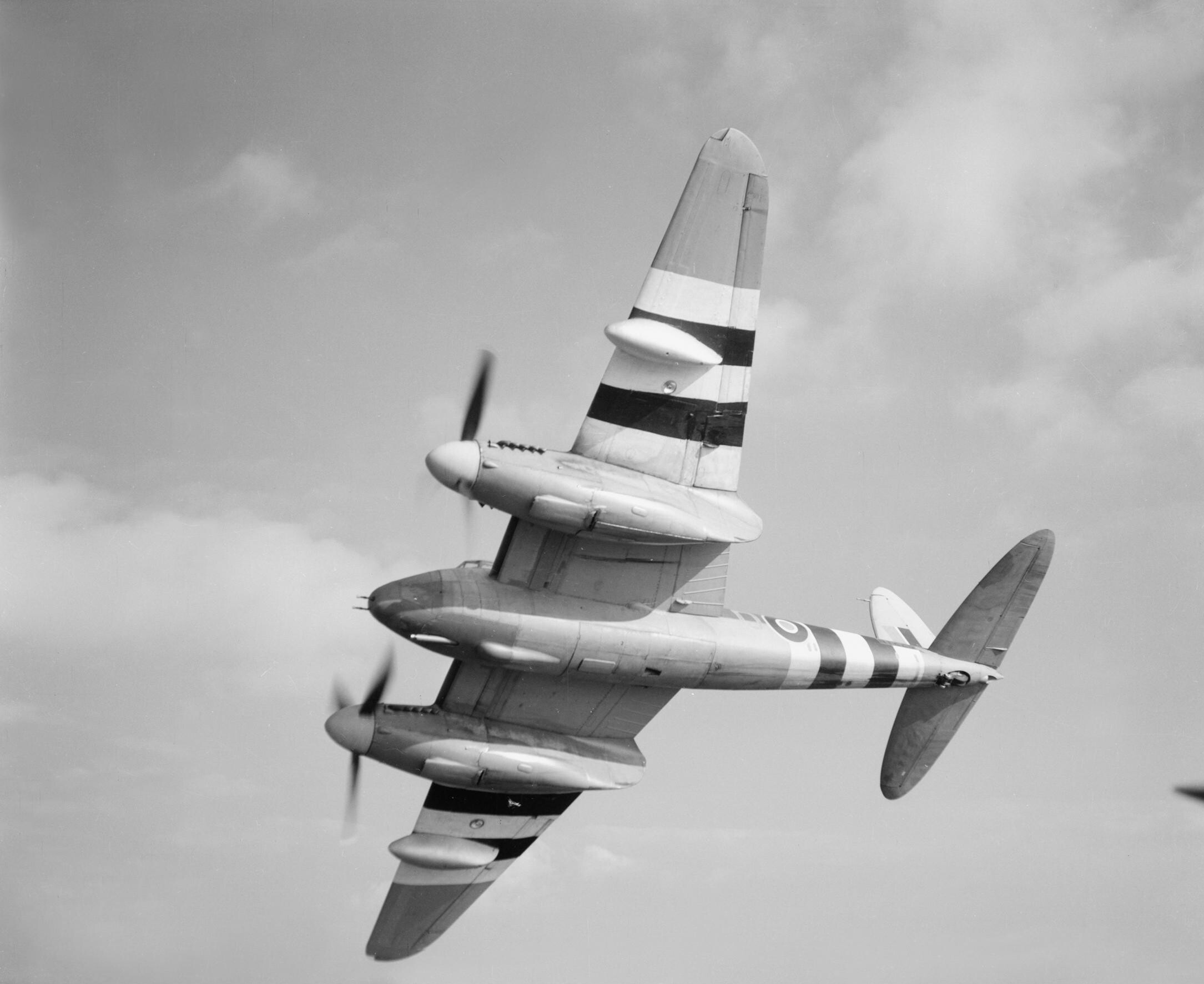
Mosquito FB Mark XVIII, NT225 O, of No. 248 Squadron RAF Special Detachment based at RAF Portreath, Cornwall, banking away from the camera while in flight, showing the 57mm Molins gun mounted underneath the nose

In July 1942, the squadron deployed to Malta, flying long-range fighter support for the Malta Convoy Operation Pedestal, attacking airfields on Sardinia and a convoy off Corfu before it returned to the UK, leaving its aircraft behind. Once back in the UK and with a fresh set of Beaufighters, the Squadron was tasked with carrying out fighter patrols over the Western Approaches and Bay of Biscay as part of No. 19 Group RAF from RAF Talbenny in Pembrokeshire. Together with fellow Beaufighter squadron No. 235, 248 had the particular role of opposing German Junkers Ju 88 fighters that were attacking Allied anti-submarine aircraft over the Bay of Biscay, with repeated combats taking place though the spring and summer of 1943, with the Squadron receiving Beaufighter Xs in June 1943, adding anti-shipping strikes to its missions and operating a detachment from Gibraltar.

In December 1943, the Squadron started to receive de Havilland Mosquito FB VI fighter-bombers, flying its final missions on the Beaufighter in January 1944 and its first patrols on the Mosquito in February that year. In March its Mosquito FB.VIs were supplemented by a detachment of ex-618 Squadron Mosquito FB.XVIIIs (nicknamed Tsetse), equipped with a 6-pounder (57 mm) cannon. The squadron used the Tsetses to attack shipping, and in particular German submarines, while the more conventional Mosquito FB.VIs provided fighter cover.

On 10 May 1944, six Mosquitos of 248 Squadron, including two Tsetse aircraft, were ordered to attack the Japanese submarine I-29, carrying a cargo of rubber, tungsten, gold bullion and 25 Japanese senior naval officers, off Cape Peñas in northern Spain. The I-29 had a heavy escort, including two destroyers and two torpedo boats, together with air cover of eight Ju 88s. 248 Squadron claimed to have shot down three Ju 88s (one by the six-pounder gun of one of the Tsetses) and damaged I-29. In fact, only one Ju 88 was shot down and I-29 was undamaged. On 25 March 1944, six 248 Squadron Mosquitos, including two Tsetses, attacked and sunk the German submarine U-976 off Saint Nazaire. During June 1944, the squadron was heavily deployed in support of Operation Overlord, the Allied invasion of Normandy, flying 274 sorties that month. The squadron damaged U-212 on 6 June, sank U-821 in conjunction with a Liberator bomber of 206 Squadron on 10 June and damaged another U-boat, U-155 off Lorient on 23 June.

In September 1944 the squadron left Cornwall for Banff in Scotland and, led by Wing Commander Gage Sise, operated as part of the Banff Strike Wing, flying anti-submarine and anti-shipping operations off the coast of Norway. It continued these operations until the end of the war in Europe. It moved to RAF Chivenor in July 1945, and was renamed 36 Squadron on 30 September 1946.

== Commanding officers ==
Commanding officers of No. 248 Squadron have included:

- W/Cdr F. E. Burton DFC (July 1943–January 1944)
- W/Cdr J. M. Barron DFC (February–March 1944)
- W/Cdr A. D. Phillips DSO, DFC (April–June 1944)
- W/Cdr G. D. Sise DSO & Bar, DFC & Bar (July 1944–March 1945)
- W/Cdr R. K. Orrock DFC (March 1945)
- W/Cdr H. N. Jackson-Smith DFC (March–September 1945)
- W/Cdr J. V. Hoggarth (October 1945)
