= RAF North Coates =

Former Royal Air Force station in Lincolnshire, England

RAF North Coates RAF North Coates Fitties
- North Coates, East Lindsey, Lincolnshire
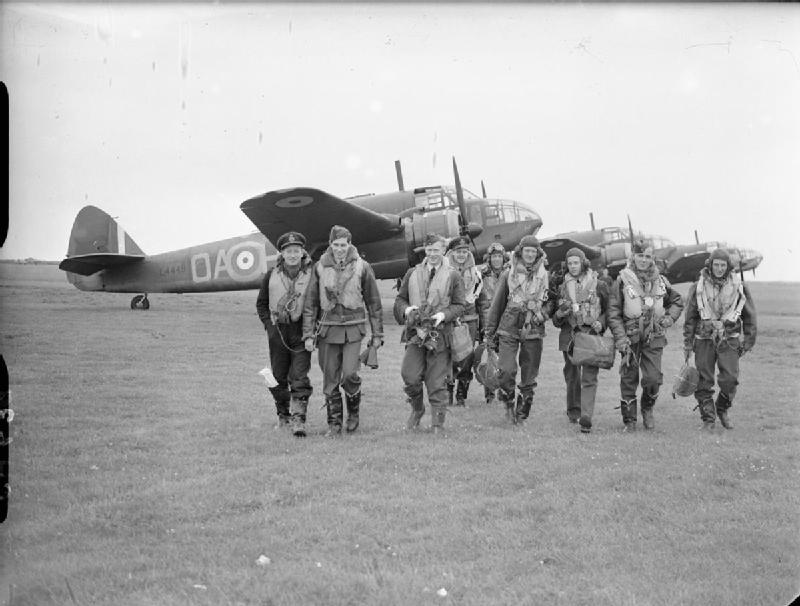
- Aircrew and Bristol Beaufort Mk Is of No. 22 Squadron at North Coates

Site information
- Code: NC
- Operator: Royal Flying Corps; Royal Air Force
- Condition: Mainly returned to agricultural use; part occupied by North Coates Flying Club
- Website: www.northcoatesflyingclub.co.uk

Location
- Location in Lincolnshire
- Coordinates: 53°29′59.3″N 0°3′57.7″E

Site history
- Built: 1914
- In use: 1916–1919; 1926–1990
- Fate: Sold to private ownership
- Battles/wars: First World War; Second World War

Garrison information
- Occupants: See list below

Airfield information
- Identifiers: ICAO: EGYO
- Elevation: 17 ft (5.2 m) AMSL
Runways
Direction	Length and surface
07/25	4,260 ft (1,300 m) Concrete (closed)
NW/SE	4,380 ft (1,340 m) Grass (closed)
05/23	760 m (2,490 ft) Grass (current)

Royal Air Force North Coates or more simply RAF North Coates is a former Royal Air Force station in Lincolnshire, England, 6 miles (10 km) south-east of Cleethorpes, and close to the mouth of the Humber estuary. It was an active air station during the First World War, and then again from the mid-1920s. Between 1942 and 1945, during the Second World War, it was the home of a Coastal Command Strike Wing, and from 1958 was a base for Bloodhound surface-to-air missiles, until it closed in 1990.

== First World War ==
The camp at North Coates Fitties (Note: The word "Fitties" is derived from an Old English term meaning salt marsh.) was opened by the army in 1914 and occupied by men of the Lincolnshire Regiment. In 1916 it was converted into a forward landing ground for aircraft from the Royal Flying Corps' No. 33 (Home Defence) Squadron, based at Brattleby, and tasked with coastal patrols in North Lincolnshire. From October 1918 it was occupied by No. 248 Squadron RAF, but after the armistice the airfield was gradually run down and eventually closed in March 1919, and the land was returned to its original owner.

== Inter-war period ==
The site was reacquired in 1926 to serve as a base for aircraft using the bombing range at nearby Donna Nook, and designated No. 2 Armament Practice Camp RAF. The station also served as a training facility for observers and air gunners from 1936 up until the beginning of the Second World War.

== Second World War ==
Following the declaration of war on 3 September 1939, the training units were transferred elsewhere, and No. 2 Recruit Training Pool was formed at the airfield, followed by the Ground Defence Gunnery School in November.

=== Coastal Command ===
In February 1940 the station was transferred to No. 16 Group, Coastal Command, and was first occupied by No.'s 235, 236 and 248 Squadrons, flying the Blenheim in both bomber and long-range fighter variants, until April 1940. North Coates was then occupied by a number of Coastal Command squadrons over the next two years, mostly RAF, but including Fleet Air Arm and Royal Canadian Air Force units, flying a variety of aircraft, mainly Bristol Beaufort torpedo bombers and Lockheed Hudson light bombers, but also Handley Page Hampden medium bombers and Fairey Swordfish torpedo bombers, Avro Anson reconnaissance aircraft and Martin Maryland light bombers.

=== North Coates Strike Wing ===
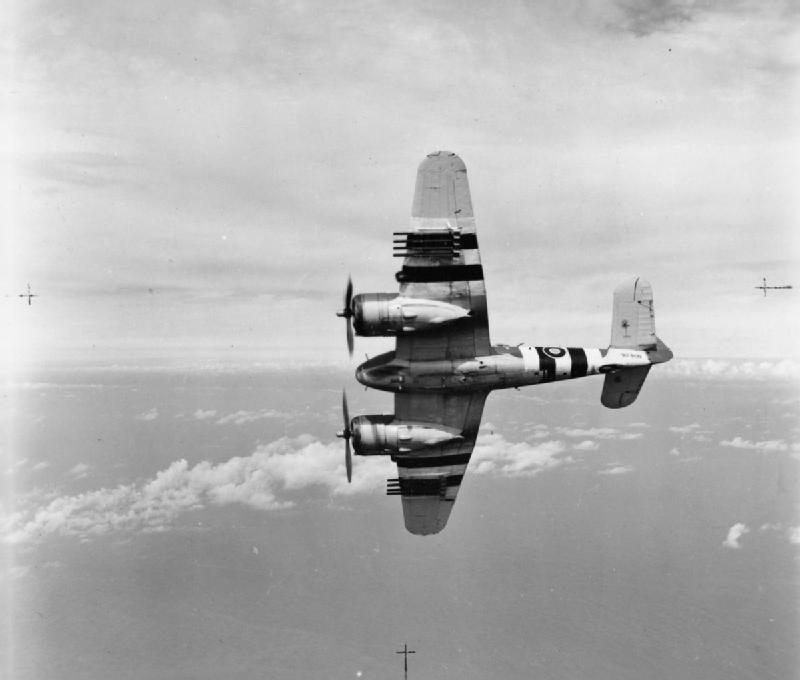
A Beaufighter TF Mark X of No. 236 Squadron RAF based at North Coates, showing the rocket rails. The aircraft is painted with invasion stripes.

In September 1942 it became the base for the North Coates Strike Wing formed from 143, 236 and 254 Squadrons, flying the Bristol Beaufighter as a heavy fighter, bomber and "Torbeau" torpedo bomber variants, to attack enemy shipping in the North Sea. The first operation of the Strike Wing took place on 20 November 1942 when Beaufighters from 236 and 254 Squadrons, the latter led by Squadron Leader Gage Sise, took off to attack a convoy of twelve to sixteen ships heading towards Rotterdam. The weather was poor, the squadrons lost contact with each other and the convoy was protected by Focke-Wulf Fw 190 fighters. Only three enemy ships were damaged but three Beaufighters were shot down and four so badly damaged that they crashed or made forced landings. The Strike Wing was promptly withdrawn from service for intensive training, during which time, between November 1942 and early 1943, the east-west concrete runway was laid.

It was not until 18 April 1943 that the Wing launched its second operation, when nine "Torbeaus" of 254 Squadron, six Beaufighter bombers of 236 Squadron, and six Beaufighter heavy fighters of 143 Squadron, with Supermarine Spitfires and North American P-51 Mustangs providing air cover, attacked a heavily escorted convoy off the Dutch coast. While the Beaufighters attacked the escort vessels with bombs, machine-gun and cannon fire, the "Torbeaus" attacked the largest merchant vessel. In the attack two M-class minesweepers were set on fire and an armed trawler was also damaged. Two confirmed torpedo strikes were made on the merchant vessel, which was left listing and on fire. The co-ordinated attack lasted only 15 minutes and only slight damage was sustained by two or three aircraft. Another operation at the end of the month resulted in the sinking of two merchant vessels and a trawler, with damage to several escort ships, for the loss of one Beaufighter. In June the Strike Wing began to use the RP-3 rocket projectile and by the middle of the year had, along with the minelayers of Bomber Command and the Royal Navy's Nore Flotilla, rendered the Port of Rotterdam almost unusable. Ship captains bringing in iron ore from Sweden began to demand bonuses of up to 300 per cent for risking their ships. By the end of the year the Strike Wing had sunk thirteen ships totalling 34,076 gross register tons and by the end of the war in May 1945 had sunk over 150,000 tons of shipping, as well as two U-boats; U-418 in the Bay of Biscay on 1 June 1943 and U-2338 off the Danish coast on 5 May 1945. They had also lost 120 aircraft and 241 aircrew.

The RAF North Coates Strike Wing War Memorial in Cleethorpes

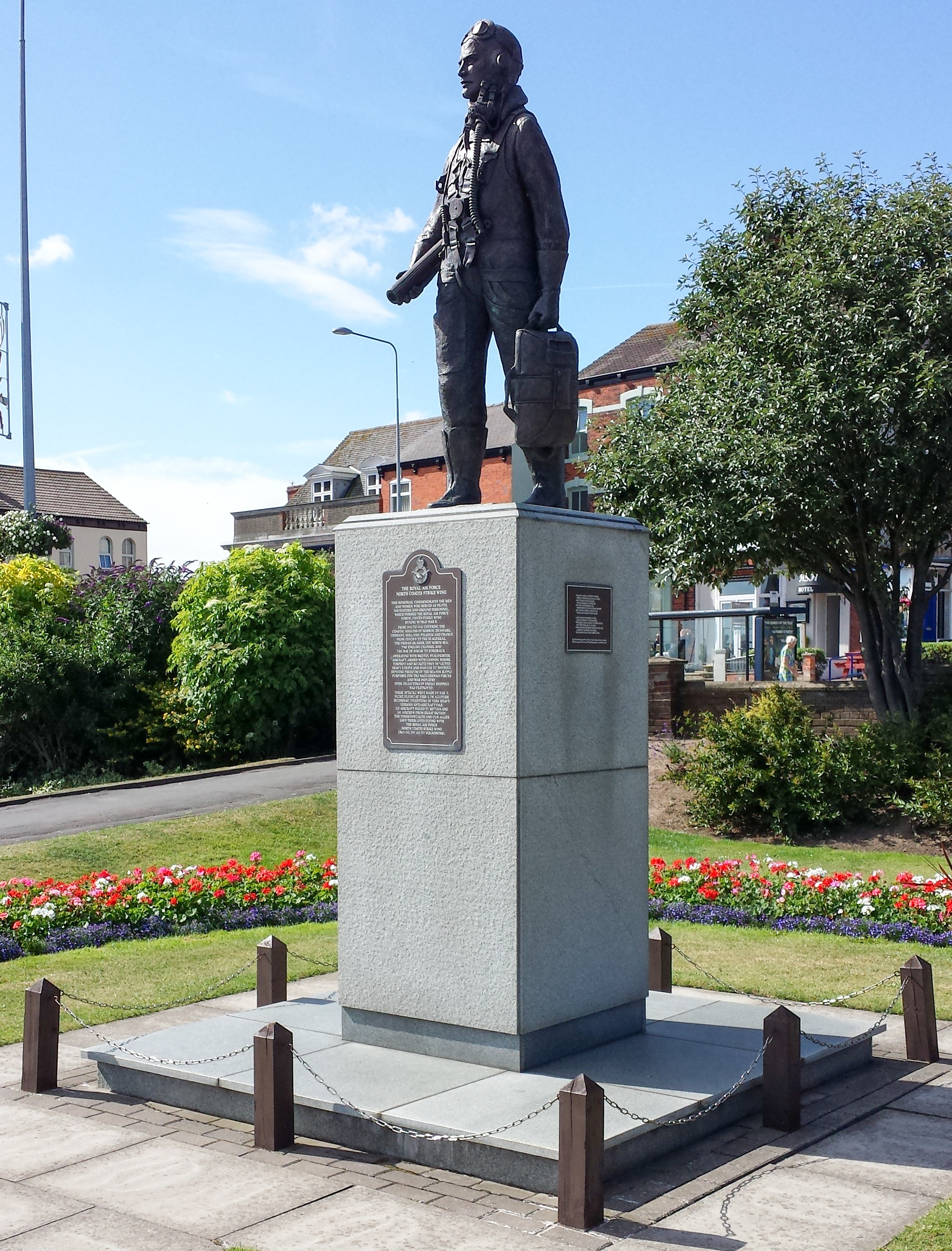
The memorial

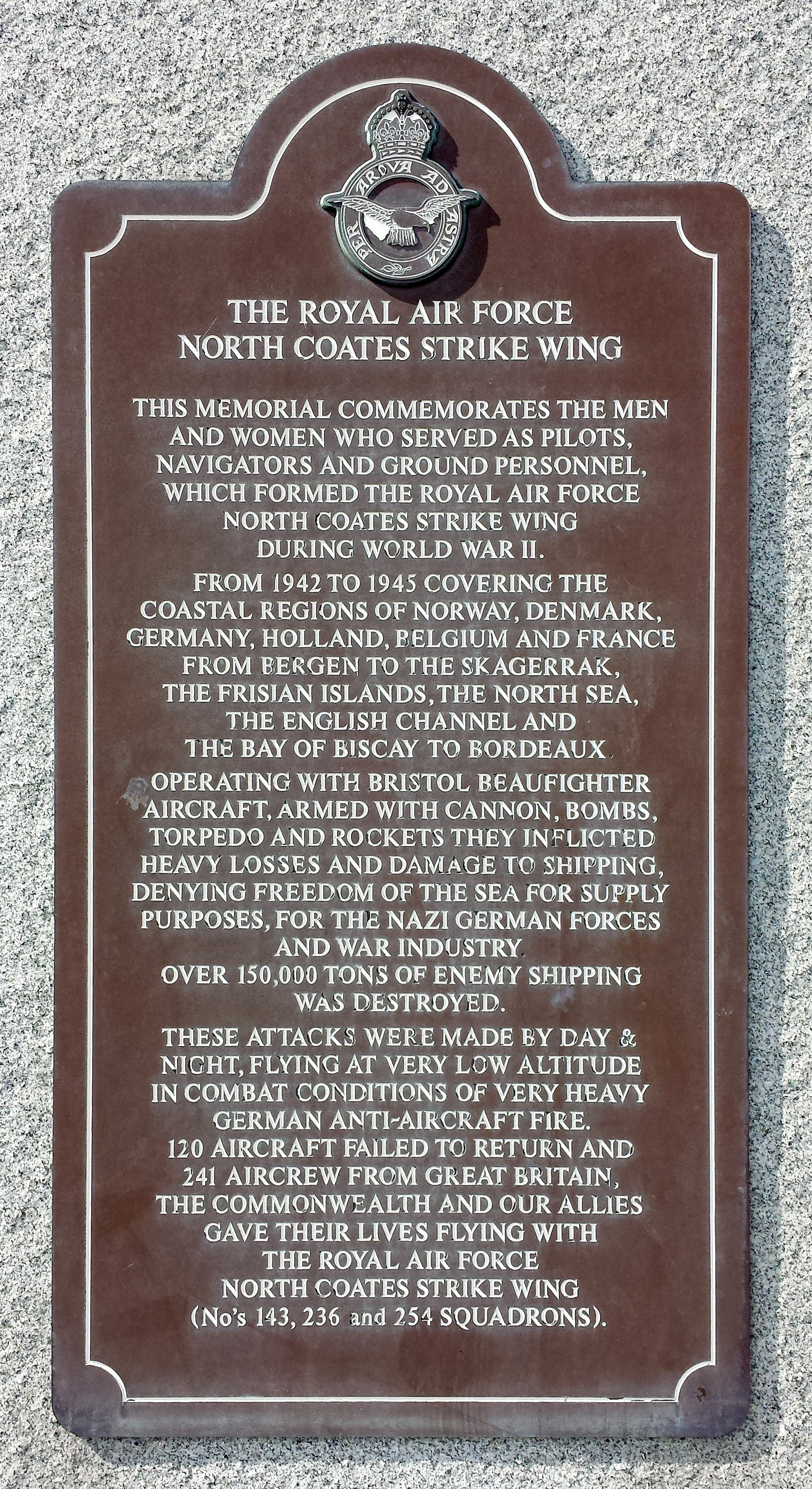
Plaque on front

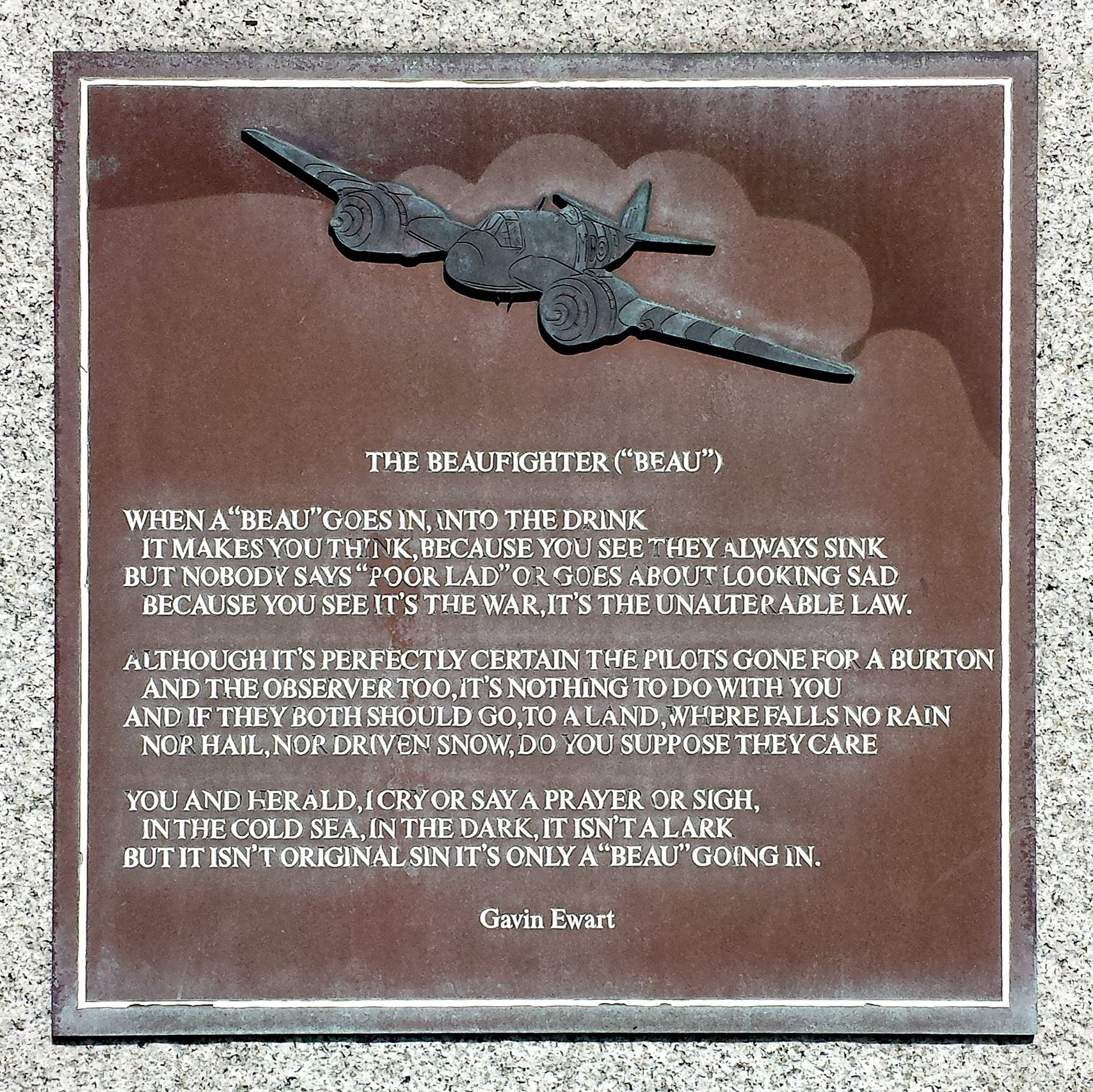
Plaque on left side

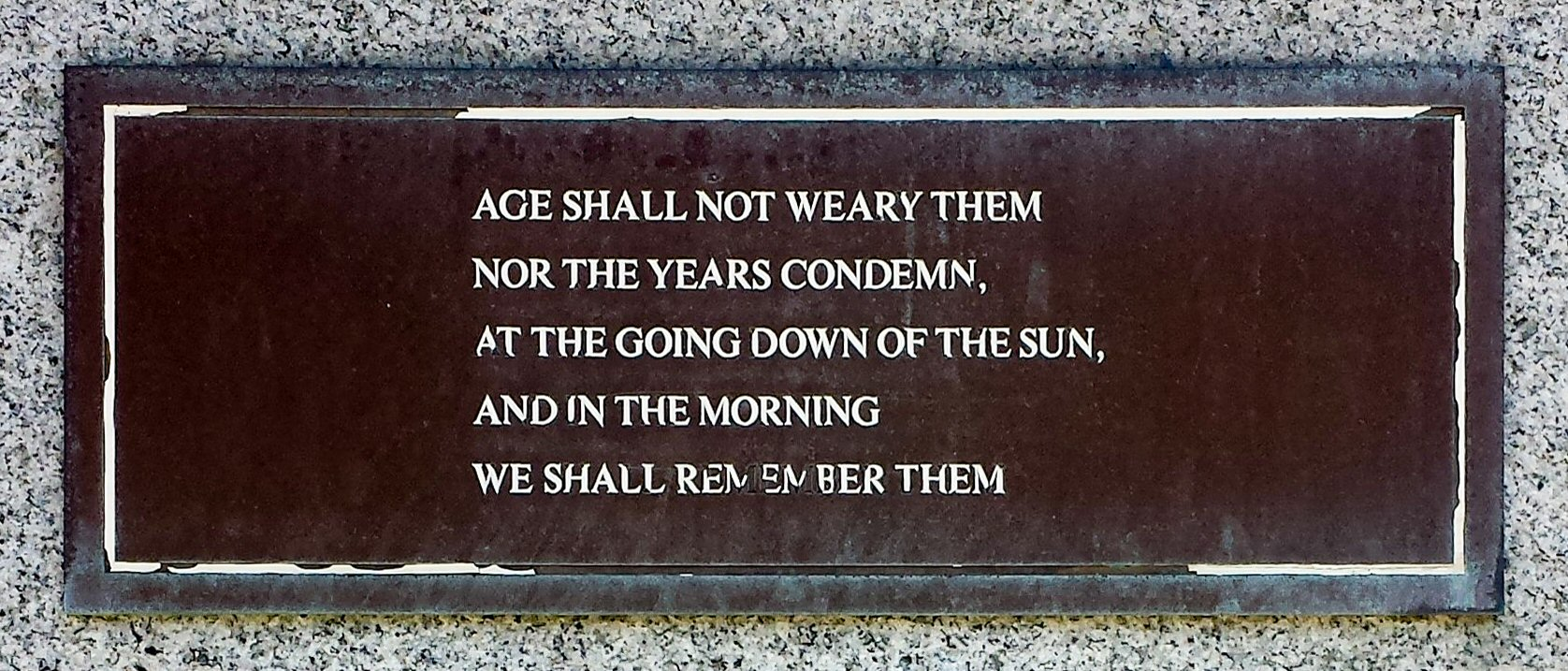
Plaque on back

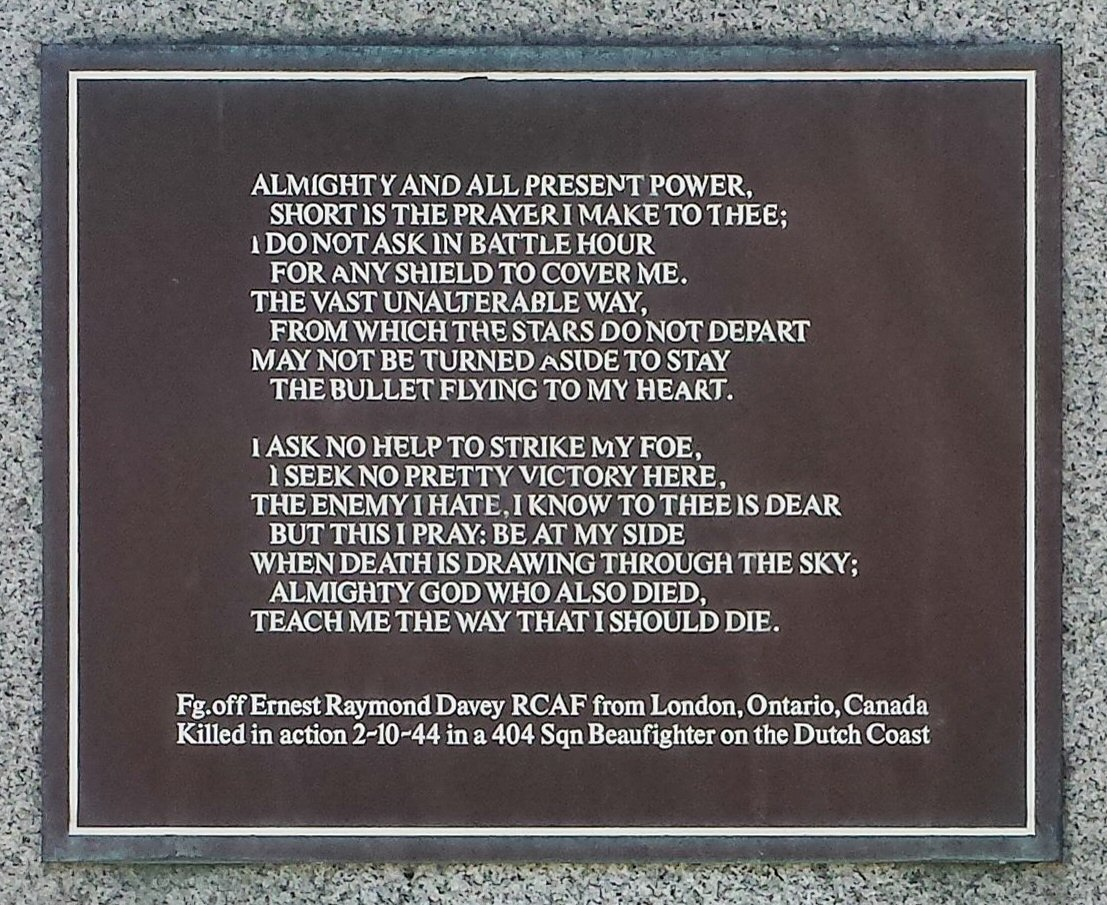
Plaque on right side

== Post-war ==
North Coates was closed in August 1946 and transferred to Maintenance Command, becoming a storage site for No. 25 Maintenance Unit RAF, and was then transferred to No. 61 Maintenance Unit RAF in October. In December 1946 the station was transferred to Flying Training Command, and in January 1947 became No. 1 Initial Training School. However the airfield’s isolation during the severe winter of 1947 meant that the Officer Cadets were soon relocated.

In May 1948 it was transferred to No. 24 Group, Technical Training Command, and became the location of the School of Explosives Inspection (15 S of T.T) and also No. 5131 Bomb Disposal Wing. In January 1953 the airfield again fell victim to the weather, being overwhelmed during the North Sea flood and was temporarily abandoned when flooded to a depth of 3 feet (0.91 m). In August 1953 the station became the home of No. 54 Maintenance Unit RAF, tasked with breaking up redundant and crashed aircraft for spare parts, coming under No. 43 Group, Maintenance Command, in December 1954. Between February 1955 and October 1957 North Coates was the base of "B" Flight, No. 275 (Air Sea Rescue) Squadron flying Bristol Sycamore HR.14. helicopters.

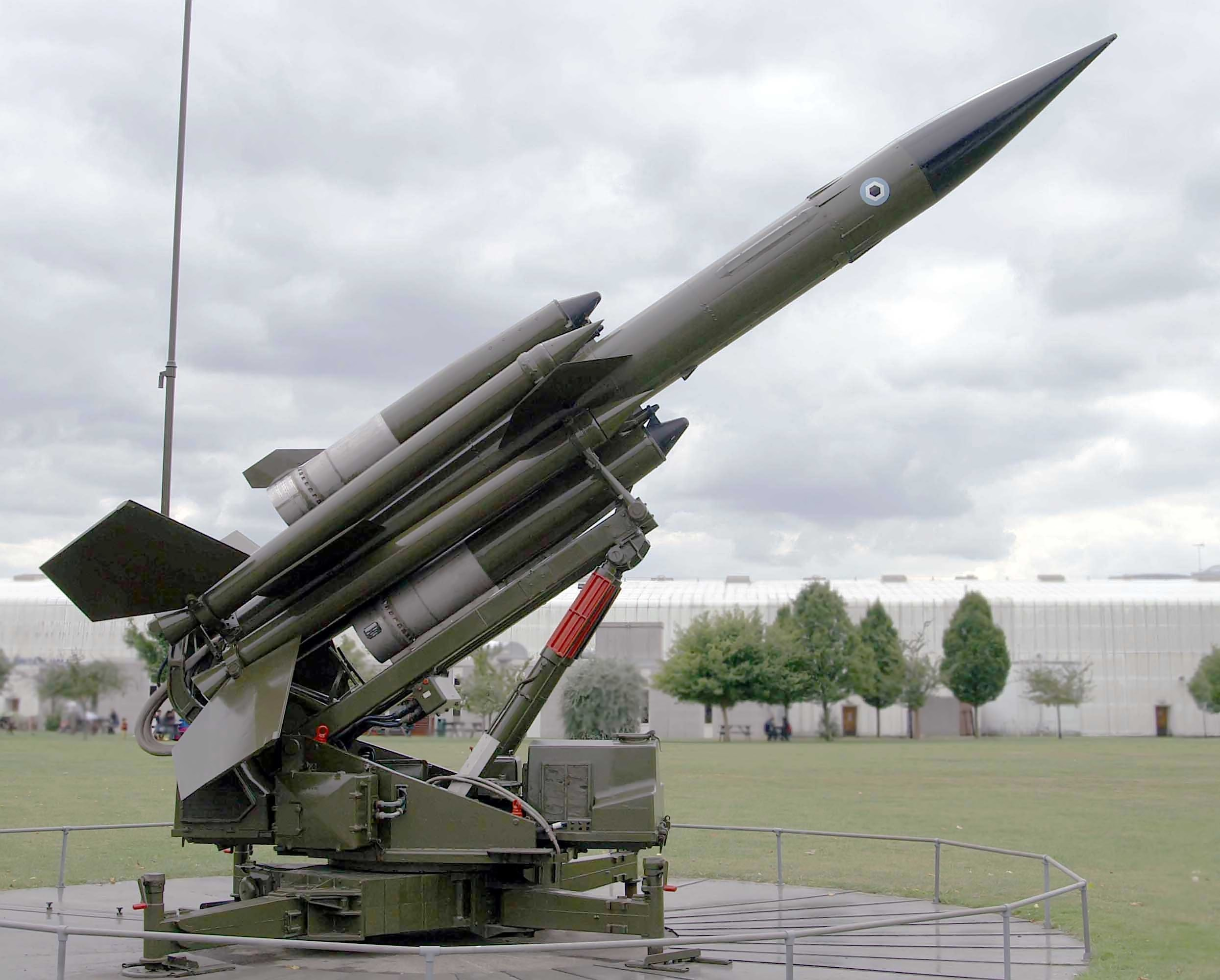
Bloodhound Mk II SAM, formerly of No. 85 Squadron

In April 1956 the airfield was selected as the site of the RAF's first Surface to Air Guided Weapons base, housing forty-eight Bloodhound surface-to-air missiles. In July 1956 work began on the construction of the missile facility, including missile pads, Tactical Control Centre, Missile Repair Section, and Servicing Hangar. In October 1957 No. 17 Joint Services Trials Unit was formed there to carry out operational trials of the Bloodhound Mk. II. The Bloodhounds remained at North Coates until mid-1990, and the station was finally closed in December, and the site transferred to the Defence Land Agency for disposal.

In April 1992 the entire airfield, technical and domestic site including the NCO and officers married quarters were sold to Roger Byron-Collins' Welbeck Estate Group. Over the ensuing 8 years the individual houses were sold and new uses were found for a variety of buildings including the Station HQ, Officers and Junior ranks messes, accommodation blocks, NAAFI and church. The airfield and related land were sold in 1999 to local farmer George Henry Parker who returned the majority of the airfield back to agriculture and demolished many ancillary buildings relating to the airfield. The concrete runway, hard standings and the taxiways were removed. One hangar is still used by the North Coates Flying Club, who laid a grass airstrip alongside the line of the old runway.

In May 2020, a wreck believed to be Beaufighter JM333 of No. 254 Squadron was uncovered by shifting sands on Cleethorpes beach near Grimsby. The aircraft was ditched on April 21, 1944 shortly after takeoff from North Coates when both engines failed. The crew survived uninjured.

== Squadrons ==
Units based at North Coates
Dates	Name	Notes
1914 – 1916	Lincolnshire Regiment	
1916 – September 1918	No. 33 Squadron RFC/RAF	Royal Aircraft Factory B.E.2.
October 1918 – March 1919	No. 248 Squadron RAF	Airco DH.6, Sopwith Baby and Sopwith Tabloid.
Closed March 1919 – 1926
February 1927 – October 1936	No. 2 Armament Practice Camp	Renamed No. 2 Armament Training Camp in December 1932.
January 1936 – 2 September 1939	Air Observers School	Renamed No. 2 Air Armaments School on 1 November 1937, and then No. 1 Air Observers School on 1 March 1938.
1934 – July 1945	North Coates Station Flight	Fairey Gordon and Westland Wallace, and a Fairey IIIF, Miles Magister M.14A, Avro Tutor and de Havilland DH.60 Gypsy Moth.
9 April 1938 – 7 May 1938	No. 144 Squadron RAF	Bristol Blenheim Mk I.
September 1939 – June 1940	No. 2 Recruit Training Pool	
December 1939 – June 1940	Ground Defence Gunnery School	Westland Wallace, Hawker Hart and Gloster Gauntlet.
January 1940 – August 1940	Detachment, No. 611 (West Lancashire) Squadron AAF	Supermarine Spitfire Mk I.
February 1940 – April 1940	No. 248 Squadron RAF	Bristol Blenheim IVF.
February 1940 – April 1940	No. 235 Squadron RAF	Bristol Blenheim Mk IA & IVF.
February 1940 – April 1940	No. 236 Squadron RAF	Bristol Blenheim Mk IA & IVF.
April 1940 – June 1941	No. 22 Squadron RAF	Bristol Beaufort Mk I, Avro Anson Mk I and Martin Maryland.
May 1940 – March 1941	812 Naval Air Squadron	Fairey Swordfish.
August 1940 – February 1941	Detachment, No. 616 (South Yorkshire) Squadron AAF	Supermarine Spitfire Mk I.
March 1941 – May 1941	816 Naval Air Squadron	Fairey Swordfish.
May 1941 – December 1941	No. 86 Squadron RAF	Bristol Beaufort Mk I.
June 1941	No. 6 Anti Aircraft Co-operation Unit	de Havilland DH.87 Leopard Moth and Westland Lysander.
July 1941 – February 1942	No. 407 Squadron RCAF	Lockheed Hudson Mk V.
November 1941 – January 1943	"D" Flight, No. 278 Squadron RAF	Westland Lysander and Boulton Paul Defiant ASR Mk. 1.
January 1942 – August 1942	No. 59 Squadron RAF	Lockheed Hudson Mk V and two Consolidated B-24 Liberator Mk III.
January 1942 – May 1942	No. 53 Squadron RAF	Lockheed Hudson Mk I & V.
February – March 1942	776 Naval Air Squadron	Blackburn Roc.
February 1942 – November 1943	No. 7 Anti Aircraft Co-operation Unit	Westland Lysander, Miles Master, de Havilland DH.85 Leopard Moth, and an Airspeed Oxford.
April – May 1942	No. 42 Squadron RAF	Bristol Beaufort Mk I.
June – August 1942	No. 415 Squadron RCAF	Handley Page Hampden TB Mk I.
August 1942 – August 1943	No. 143 Squadron RAF	Bristol Blenheim Mk IV and Bristol Beaufighter Mk IIF.
September 1942 – October 1942	Detachment, No. 608 (North Riding) Squadron AAF	Lockheed Hudson Mk V.
September 1942 – May 1945	No. 236 Squadron RAF	Bristol Beaufighter.
November 1942 – June 1945	No. 254 Squadron RAF	Bristol Beaufighter, de Havilland Mosquito Mk XVIII, a Bristol Beaufort and an Avro Anson.
January – March 1944	No. 415 Squadron RCAF	Vickers Wellington XIII.
February – May, & September 1944	No. 143 Squadron RAF	Bristol Beaufighter, a Bristol Blenheim and a de Havilland Mosquito.
September – October 1945	No. 25 Maintenance Unit	
October 1945 – December 1946	No. 61 Maintenance Unit	
January – October 1947	No. 1 Initial Training School	
May 1948 – August 1953	No 15 S of T T	
July 1948 – August 1953	No. 5131 Bomb Disposal Wing	
August 1953 – July 1956	No. 54 Maintenance Unit	
Mid-1954 – June 1990	RAF North Coates Station Flight	Avro Anson.
November 1954 – October 1957	"B" Flight, No. 275 (Air Sea Rescue) Squadron RAF	Bristol Sycamore HR.14.
December 1958 – November 1962	No. 264 Squadron RAF	Bristol Bloodhound Mk I.
February 1962 – December 1966	No. 17 Joint Services Trials Unit	Bristol Bloodhound Mk II.
February 1963 – April 1964	No. 148 (SAM) Service Wing	Bristol Bloodhound Mk I.
October 1963 – January 1971	No. 25 Squadron RAF	Bristol Bloodhound Mk I, converted to Mk II in 1964.
October 1963 – August 1964	Surface to Air Missile Operational Training School	Bristol Bloodhound Mk II. Absorbed into No. 25 Squadron RAF.
March 1976 – April 1990	"B" Flight, No. 85 Squadron RAF	Bristol Bloodhound Mk II.
April 1987 – June 1990	Bloodhound Missile System Maintenance School	Bristol Bloodhound Mk II.

== See also ==
- List of former Royal Air Force stations
