= RAF Haverfordwest =

Former Royal Air Force station in Pembrokeshire, Wales

RAF Haverfordwest
- Haverfordwest, Rudbaxton, Pembrokeshire in Wales

Site information
- Type: Royal Air Force station
- Owner: Air Ministry
- Operator: Royal Air Force
- Controlled by: RAF Coastal Command * No. 17 (T) Group RAF

Location
- Shown within Pembrokeshire RAF Haverfordwest (the United Kingdom)
- Coordinates: 51°49′53″N 004°57′49″W

Site history
- Built: 1942
- In use: 1943-1945
- Fate: became Haverfordwest Airport
- Battles/wars: European theatre of World War II

Garrison information
- Occupants: 1944; Officers - 232 (12 WAAF); Other Ranks - 1,107 (366 WAAF)

Airfield information
- Elevation: 50 metres (164 ft) AMSL
Runways
Direction	Length and surface
03/21	1,460 metres (4,790 ft) Concrete/Tarmac
09/27	1,030 metres (3,379 ft) Concrete/Tarmac
16/34	1,080 metres (3,543 ft) Concrete/Tarmac

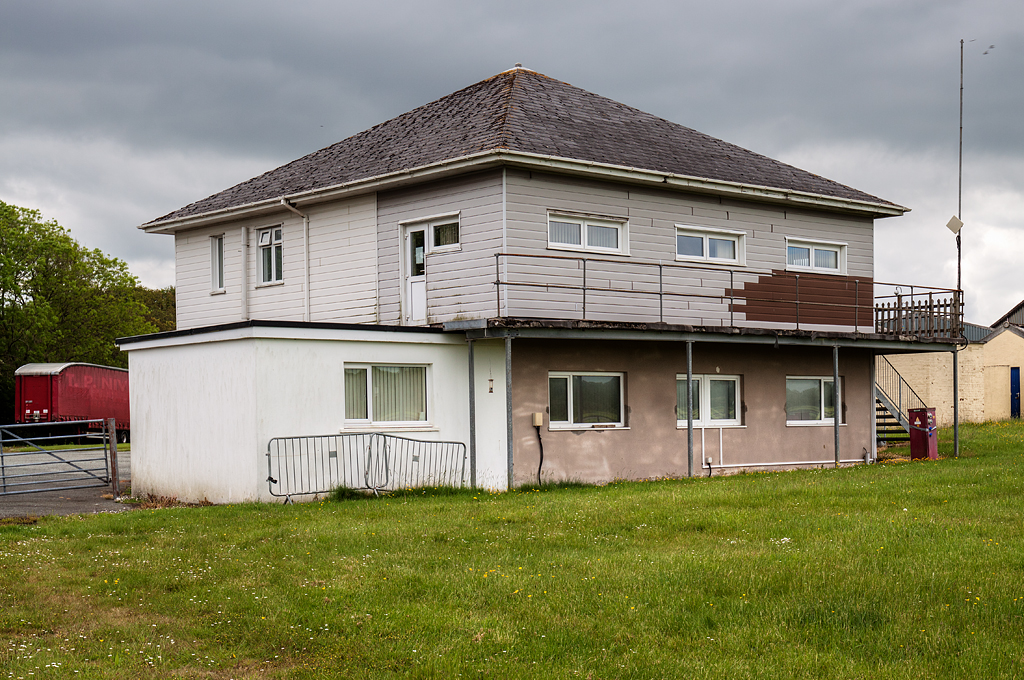
The former RAF control tower has been altered somewhat, with a new slate roof above its original flat concrete one, but otherwise retains many of its original features, including its concrete balcony and railings

Royal Air Force Haverfordwest or more commonly RAF Haverfordwest, is a former Royal Air Force station located 2.1 miles (3.4 km) north of Haverfordwest, Pembrokeshire and 11 miles (18 km) south of Fishguard, Pembrokeshire, Wales.

Situated north of Haverfordwest, at Withybush, in the community of Rudbaxton, its satellite airfield was RAF Templeton It was operational between 1943 and 1945 and was controlled by No. 17 (T) Group of RAF Coastal Command. On the 1 June 1946 the site was passed over to the Board of Trade.

== History ==
In March 1941 approval for land acquisition, for the construction of an airfield for RAF Coastal Command to use as a bomber operational training unit, was given for an area of fields between the villages of Rudbaxton and Crundale, just outside Haverfordwest.

While the location itself provided no major difficulties, it was quite level with mostly hedges as field boundaries, it took longer than anticipated to construct the airfield with resources in short supply due to conflicting priorities over which airfield to build.

=== Station design ===
Haverfordwest airfield, also referred to as Withybush, was constructed with thirty two dispersal hard stands, and a connecting perimeter track. The airfield had three runways, constructed in triangular pattern, 04/22 1554 m (5100 ft) long, 17/35 1152 m (3780 ft) long, and 10/28 1097 m (3600 ft) long. It had two T2 hangars, with seventeen dispersal pans and a nearby technical site next to the administration blocks.

An oil powered electric generator was installed at the airfield to supply it with electric power. Initially the airfield was fed from Haverfordwest's power station, unfortunately, this resulted in the airfield overloading it, causing a blackout both at Haverfordwest and the airfield.

=== RAF Coastal Command ===
The station opened on the 10 November 1942, however, it was incomplete with the site still undergoing construction, and only the control tower and runways finished. Four aircraft from No. 3 (Coastal) Operational Training Unit RAF were the first to arrive at RAF Haverfordwest on the 30 November. Initially civilian tankers were needed for aircraft refuelling, making regular daily visits. Eventually in June 1943, No. 3 (C) OTU began full general reconnaissance training when all of its aircraft types arrived which included, Armstrong Whitworth Whitley, a British medium bomber aircraft, Vickers Warwick, a multi-purpose twin-engined British aircraft, used across maritime reconnaissance, air-sea rescue and transport roles, Vickers Wellington, a British twin-engined, long-range medium bomber, and Avro Anson, a British twin-engine, multi-role aircraft. No. 3 (C) OTU's Polish Flight arrived in October 1943, equipped with Vickers Wellington aircraft.

In January 1944, No. 3 (C) OTU was disbanded and No. 7 (Coastal) Operational Training Unit RAF relocated from RAF Limavady in Northern Ireland. It was also equipped with Vickers Wellington aircraft and tasked with a general reconnaissance training role. No. (C) 7 OTU was later re-designated as No. 4 Refresher Flying Unit RAF in May 1944, tasked with delivering aircraft to various RAF Coastal Command stations and providing aircraft repair facilities. The General Reconnaissance Aircraft Pool formed around the same time, its role was to provide a ready supply of Handley Page Halifax, a British four-engined heavy bomber, Consolidated Liberator, an American heavy bomber, and Vickers Wellington bomber aircraft, for RAF Coastal Command. No. 4 Refresher Flying Unit was disbanded in September and the General Reconnaissance Aircraft Pool relocated to RAF St Davids in October 1944.

In January 1945, No. 8 (Coastal) Operational Training Unit RAF arrived at RAF Haverfordwest, moving in from RAF Dyce, near Aberdeen. It provided training in photographic reconnaissance, operating de Havilland Mosquito and Supermarine Spitfire aircraft. Up until April 1945, as a secondary task, No. 8 (C) OTU performed an aerial survey of Great Britain. In June 1945, the unit moved to RAF Mount Farm. The last unit to be based at RAF Haverfordwest was an RAF Aircrew Holding Unit (ACHU) which left for RAF Thorney Island, before Haverfordwest closed on 22 November 1945.

=== Haverfordwest Airport ===
Pembrokeshire County Council purchased the site and it re-opened in 1952, with Cambrian Air Services flying from Haverfordwest to Cardiff. The old Welsh Airways terminal has now been rebuilt and houses a café and flying school.

== Royal Air Force operational history ==
=== Operational Training Units ===
==== No 3 Operational Training Unit ====
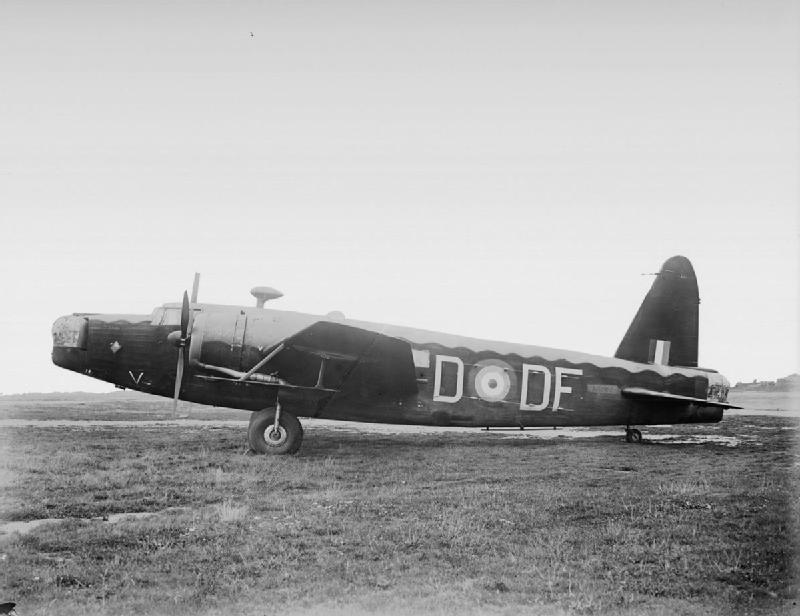
Vickers Wellington GR Mark VIII, an example of the type used by No. 3 (C)OTU

No. 3 (Coastal) Operational Training Unit RAF was the first unit to be officially based at RAF Haverfordwest. Initially, on the 30 November 1942, four of its Armstrong Whitworth Whitley aircraft, along with ground crew, moved in from RAF Cranwell. Its role was to provide reconnaissance training and by June 1943 its full complement of aircraft had arrived, it operated with:

- Airspeed Oxford II
- Armstrong Whitworth Whitley V & VII
- Avro Anson I
- Bristol Beaufighter I
- Bristol Beaufort I
- Bristol Blenheim I & IV
- de Havilland Tiger Moth II
- Fairey Battle
- Handley Page Hampden I
- Miles Magister
- Miles Martinet I
- Vickers Warwick
- Vickers Wellington I, IA, IC, III, VIII, X, XI, XII, XIII & XIV
- Westland Lysander I, III & IIIA

Between the 5 October 1943 and the 1 November 1944, No. 3 (C) OTU's Polish flight, equipped with Vickers Wellington aircraft, operated out of RAF Haverfordwest.

No 3 (C) OTU's Armstron Whitworth Whitley aircraft were eventually withdrawn, being replaced with Vickers Wellington aircraft. Lack of space at RAF Haverfordwest, meant 'O' Flight operated out of the satellite airfield, RAF Templeton. In December 1943 the unit's Avro Anson aircraft moved to RAF St Athan and became part of No. 12 Radio School RAF.

No. 3 (C) OTU was disbanded at RAF Haverfordwest, on 4 January 1944.

==== No 7 Operational Training Unit ====
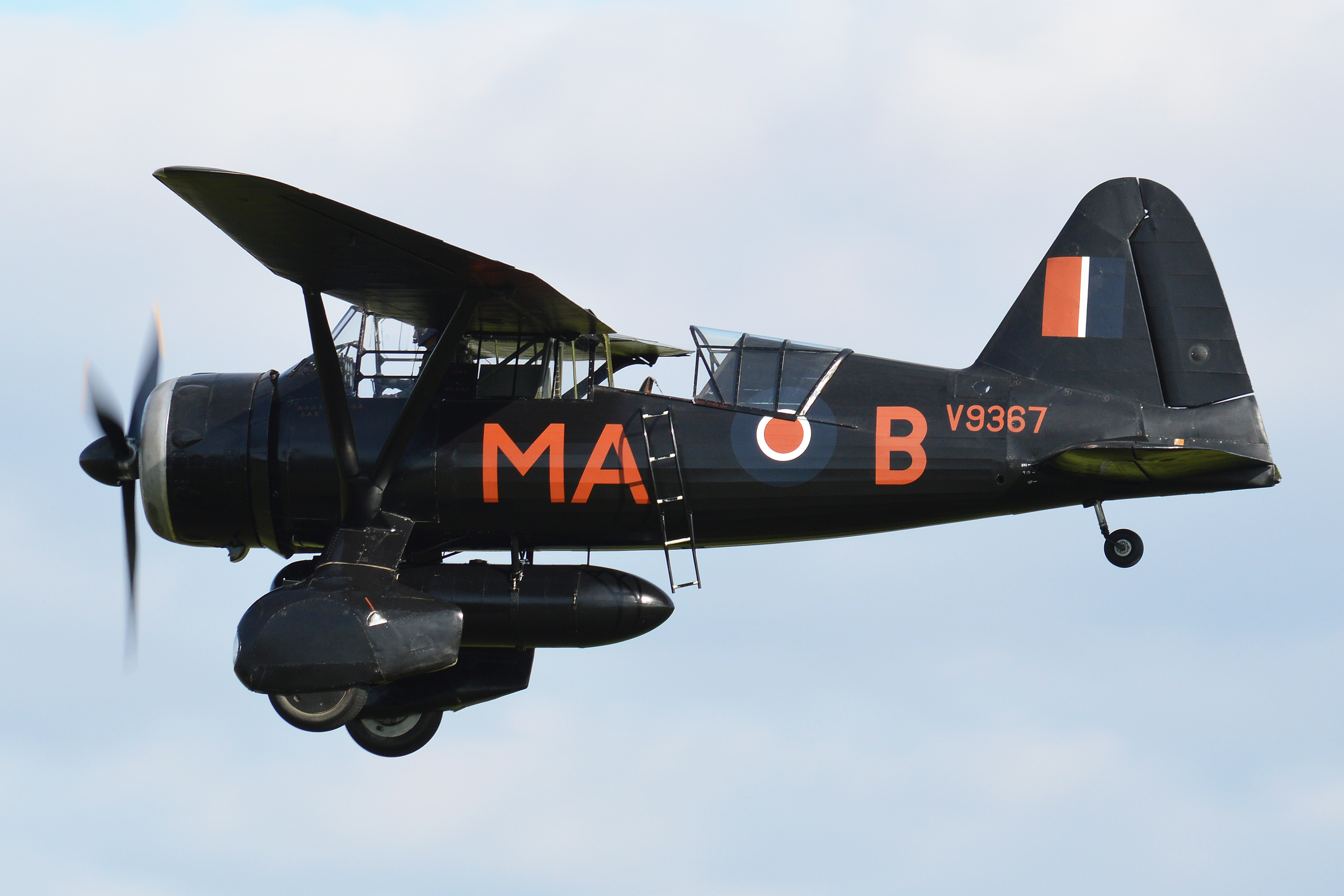
Westland Lysander IIIa 'V9367 - MA-B', an example of the type used by No. 7 (C)OTU

No. 7 (Coastal) Operational Training Unit RAF arrived on the 4 January 1944, from RAF Limavady. The unit was tasked with both ASV radar and Reconnaissance training. It operated with various aircraft:

- Vickers Wellington IA, IC, VIII, XI, XIII & XIV
- Avro Anson I
- Westland Lysander III & IIIA
- Miles Magister
- de Havilland Tiger Moth II
- Miles Martinet I

No. 7 (C) OTU was disbanded on 16 May 1944 at RAF Haverfordwest and became No. 4 Refresher Flying Unit. The newly formed unit had a secondary role in top of that of RAF Coastal Command aircrew training, the unit also moved aircraft around the UK to numerous other Coastal Command units. No. 4 RFU was equipped with Vickers Wellington aircraft, operating variants: III, X, XI, XIII and XIV. No. 4 Refresher Flying Unit disbanded at Haverfordwest in September 1944.

==== No 8 Operational Training Unit ====
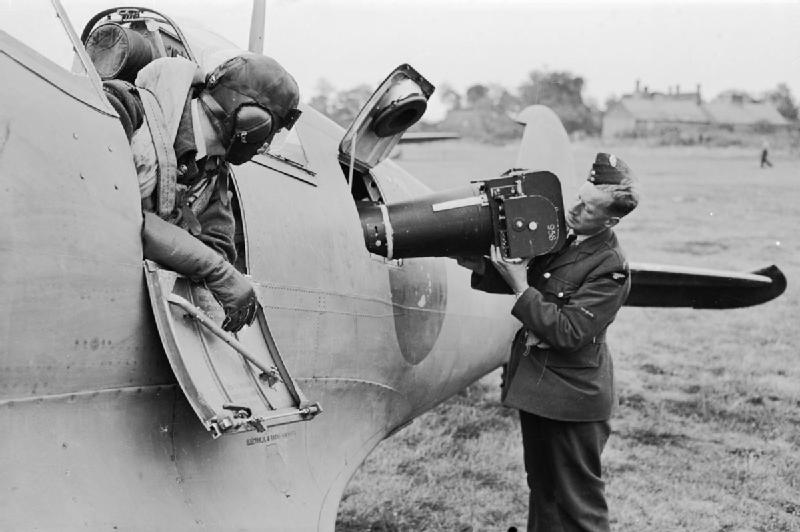
A Type F.8 Mark II (20-inch lens) aerial camera being loaded into the vertical position in a Supermarine Spitfire PR Mark IV

No. 8 (Coastal) Operational Training Unit RAF, which provided photo-reconnaissance Pilot training for the RAF, transferred from RAF Dyce. The training instruction consisted both high and low flying, with areas around the Preseli Mountains used for low-level training. The unit arrived in January 1945 and was equipped with de Havilland Mosquito and Supermarine Spitfire.

On the 27 February 1945, a combination of around thirty Spitfire and Mosquito aircraft, from No. 8 OTU, moved to RAF Brawdy due to a lack of parking space at RAF Haverfordwest, as it had twice as many aircraft as it had been designed to take. The detachment became a lodger and remained at Brawdy until June when it relocated to RAF Mount Farm.

No. 8 OTU had a secondary task up until April 1945. It conducted an aerial survey of the British Isles, which then was continued by a specialist survey unit. The unit was formed of five flights. 'A' flight was stationed at RAF Templeton airfield. Four other ‘B', 'C’, 'D' and 'F’ operated out of Haverfordwest. On the 21 June 1945, No. 8 OTU moved to the main photographic reconnaissance base RAF Mount Farm.

=== Other Units ===
General Reconnaissance Aircraft Preparation Pool

General Reconnaissance Aircraft Preparation Pool was formed, in May 1944, at RAF Haverfordwest. Vickers Wellington GR Mark XIV, Consolidated Liberator GR Mk.V & GR Mk.VI, and Handley Page Halifax GR.II aircraft, were readied for immediate RAF Coastal Command use. The unit moved to RAF St Davids on the 1 October 1944.

No. 516 Squadron RAF

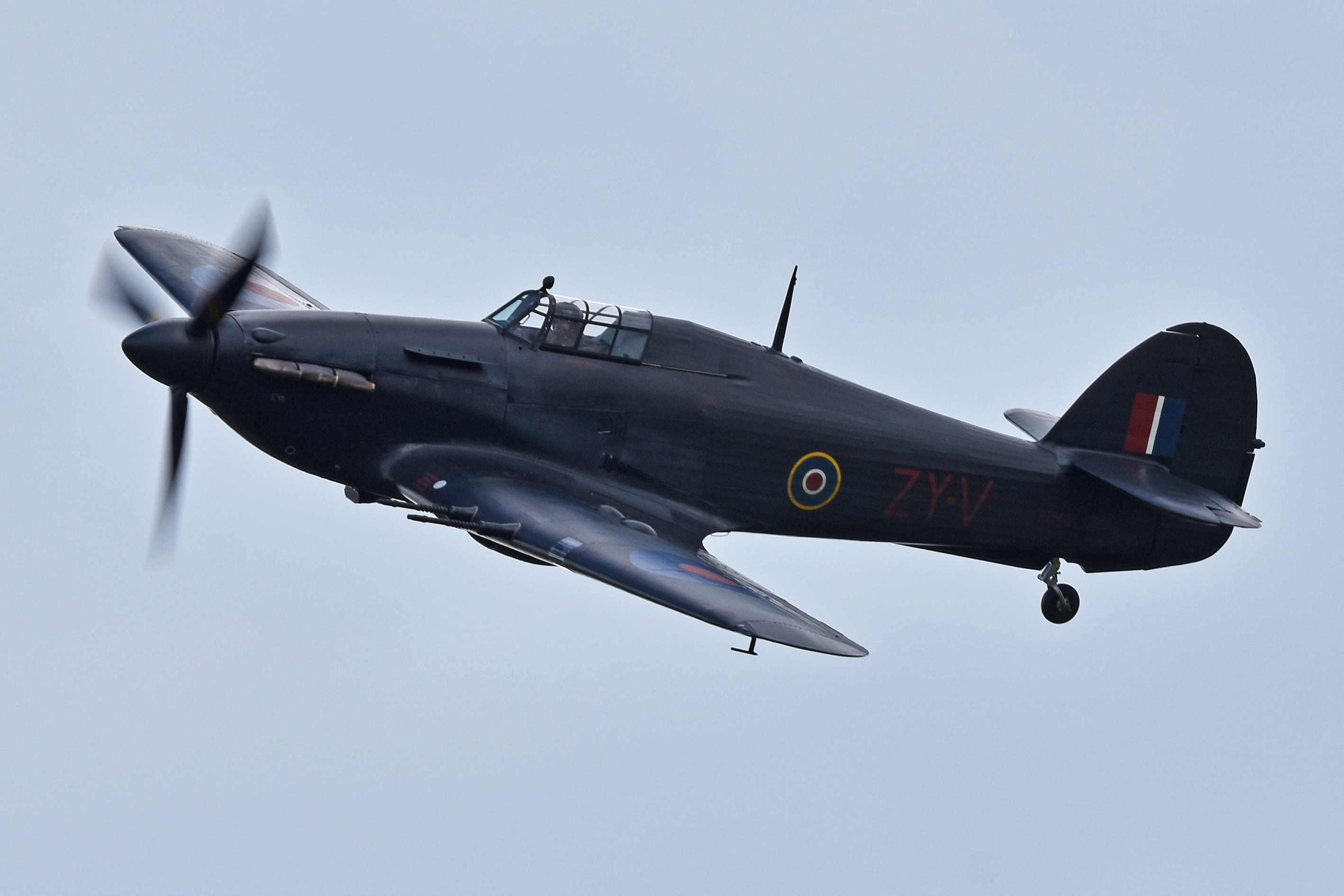
Hawker Hurricane IIc ‘PZ865 ZY-V’, an example of those used by 516 Sqn

No. 516 Squadron RAF was an army co-operation squadron. It was involved in Combined Operations training, tasked to provide realistic low-level attacks against commando and assault troops undergoing training. The squadron operated a detachment out of RAF Haverfordwest between the 27 August and the 11 September 1944, it was equipped with Hawker Hurricane IIC

RAF Templeton

RAF Haverfordwest had a satellite airfield at RAF Templeton, which was used as a relief landing ground and to resolve space and parking issues at Haverfordwest.

RAF Regiment

No. 2710 Squadron RAF Regiment converted to the Rifle role in July 1944. It moved from Gibraltar to Haverfordwest on 4 November 1944; moved on to RAF St Davids 21 December 1944.

No. 2776 Squadron RAF Regiment was an Anti Aircraft flight. It moved from RAF Dyce to Haverfordwest on the 30 January 1943; moved on to RAF Davidstow Moor on the 3 May 1943.

Air Crew Holding Unit

No 20 Air Crew Holding Unit RAF was formed on 18 June 1945 under the control of No. 17 Group RAF at RAF Haverfordwest. This was followed by No 21 Air Crew Holding Unit RAF on the 15 August. These units were set up to take in aircrew from the British Commonwealth Air Training Plan to be used as reinforcements. Both units left RAF Haverfordwest on the 15 November 1945.

== Current use ==
The site is currently used by Haverfordwest Airport, a public-use general aviation airport.

== Previous units ==
The following units were here posted here at some point:

- No. 3 (Coastal) Operational Training Unit RAF between June 1943 and January 1944 when the unit disbanded, using the Vickers Wellington, Avro Anson and Airspeed Oxford
- Polish Flight was here and part of No. 3 (C) OTU between October 1943 and January 1944
- No. 7 (Coastal) Operational Training Unit RAF between January and May 1944 when the unit disbanded, using the Wellington and Anson
- No. 4 Refresher Flying Unit RAF
- No. 8 (Coastal) Operational Training Unit RAF between January and June 1945 using the Supermarine Spitfire and de Havilland Mosquito
- No. 20 Air Crew Holding Unit RAF between June and September 1945
- No. 21 Air Crew Holding Unit RAF between August and November 1945
- No. 516 Squadron RAF
- No. 2710 Squadron RAF Regiment
- No. 2776 Squadron RAF Regiment
- General Reconnaissance Aircraft Preparation Pool between May and October 1944 with Wellingtons, Consolidated Liberators & Handley Page Halifaxes
- Navigators 'W' Holding Course between September and October 1944

== See also ==
- List of former Royal Air Force stations
- List of Royal Air Force Operational Training Units
- RAF Templeton, satellite airfield for RAF Haverfordwest
