= RAF Mullaghmore =

Former Royal Air Force station in County Antrim, Northern Ireland

RAF Mullaghmore USAAF Station AAF-240
- Ballymoney, County Antrim in Northern Ireland

Site information
- Type: Satellite Station
- Owner: Air Ministry
- Operator: Royal Air Force; Royal Navy; United States Army Air Forces
- Controlled by: RAF Coastal Command; Fleet Air Arm

Location
- Shown within Northern Ireland RAF Mullaghmore (the United Kingdom)
- Coordinates: 55°01′33″N 006°35′49″W

Site history
- Built: 1942
- In use: 1942-1946
- Battles/wars: European theatre of World War II

Airfield information
- Elevation: 7 metres (23 ft) AMSL
Runways
Direction	Length and surface
00/00	Concrete
00/00	Concrete

Royal Air Force Mullaghmore or more simply RAF Mullaghmore is a former Royal Air Force station located 4.2 miles (6.8 km) southwest of Ballymoney, County Antrim, Northern Ireland and 4.9 miles (7.9 km) northeast of Garvagh, County Londonderry.

== History ==
It was a United States Army Air Forces 8th Air Force Composite Command base until being passed to the Royal Air Force in May 1944 for use as a training establishment.

Between December 1943 and February 1944 the airfield was used the United States Army Air Forces (USAAF)'s 6th Replacement and Training Squadron (Bombardment) and the 6th Combat Crew Replacement Centre before the unit moved to RAF Cheddington. The airfield was then used for storage until May 1944.

The following units were based there:

- No. 4 Refresher Flying Unit RAF which moved from RAF Haverfordwest and stayed between October 1945 and March 1945
- No. 7 (Coastal) OTU flying Vickers Wellingtons between December 1942 and January 1944
- No. 104 (Transport) OTU arrived from RAF Maghaberry flying Vickers Wellingtons between October 1943 and January 1944
- No. 281 Squadron RAF
- 815 Naval Air Squadron
- 825 Naval Air Squadron
- 842 Naval Air Squadron
- 850 Naval Air Squadron
- 1771 Naval Air Squadron
- Loran Training Unit RAF (October 1944 – April 1945)

The airfield was closed and placed on care and maintenance during May 1945.

== Current use ==
The airfield, now in private hands, is used as a microlight base known locally as Aghadowey Aerodrome. Other uses include a racing circuit built on one of the old runways and a short-oval track hosting Stock car and Banger racing on selected weekends.

== See also ==
- List of former Royal Air Force stations
