= Rudbaxton =

Village, parish and community in Pembrokeshire, Wales

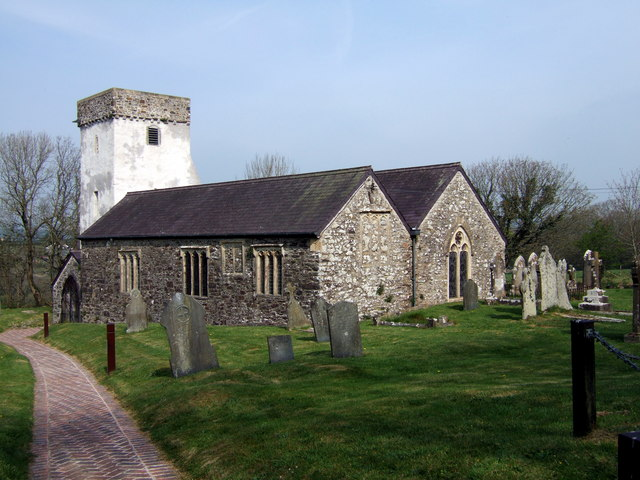
- St Michael's Church

- Location within Pembrokeshire
- Population: 768 (2011)
- OS grid reference: SM 961 205
  - Cardiff: 80.6 mi (129.7 km)
  - London: 208.3 mi (335.2 km)
- Community: Rudbaxton
- Principal area: Pembrokeshire
- Country: Wales
- Sovereign state: United Kingdom
- Post town: Haverfordwest
- Postcode district: SA62
- Police: Dyfed-Powys
- Fire: Mid and West Wales
- Ambulance: Welsh
- UK Parliament: Preseli Pembrokeshire
- Senedd Cymru – Welsh Parliament: Ceredigion Penfro
- List of places UK Wales Pembrokeshire 51.846°N 4.961°W Map of the community

Rudbaxton is a village, parish and a local government community in the county of Pembrokeshire, Wales. It is 81 miles (130 km) from Cardiff and 208 miles (335 km) from London.

== Description ==
The community includes the expanding village of Crundale and the settlements of Poyston Cross, Bethlehem and Rudbaxton Water.

In 2011, the population of Rudbaxton was 768 with 18.2 per cent able to speak Welsh and in 2015 the population was estimated at 850 in 450 dwellings.

== History ==
Rudbaxton parish was in the hundred of Dungleddy, a corruption of the Welsh for two Cleddau, referring to the Eastern and Western Cleddau rivers, which form part of the parish boundary. The Haverfordwest to Fishguard turnpike (now the A40) ran through the western half of the parish. It appeared as Redbaxton on a 1578 parish map of Pembrokeshire. Once entirely rural and agricultural, the former parish now includes the northeastern part of the expanding county town of Haverfordwest, and is in the parish of Daugleddau in the Diocese of St Davids.

By 1708, efforts were being made by a "neighbouring Gentleman" to clothe and educate the poor children of the parish. A school was established by the SPCK and the philanthropist Sir John Philipps. In 1833 the population of the parish was 621, and the school educated 11 pupils, partly funded by the Baptist movement. A National School was established in 1877 and the school's minutes and correspondence papers from 1877 to 1966 are held at Pembrokeshire Record Office.

In 1831, about 75 per cent of males over 20 years were occupied in agriculture. The population in 1870 was 586, occupying 130 houses. The population had expanded from 472 in 1801 to 669 in 1851, and then fell to 405 by 1961.

In 1942, a large area of the parish was taken over to build RAF Haverfordwest, later becoming Withybush Airport.

== Governance ==
Rudbaxton has been an electoral ward to Pembrokeshire County Council since 1995, electing one county councillor.

The community also elects up to ten members of Rudbaxton Community Council, which meets regularly at Crundale Community Hall.

== Prehistoric remains ==
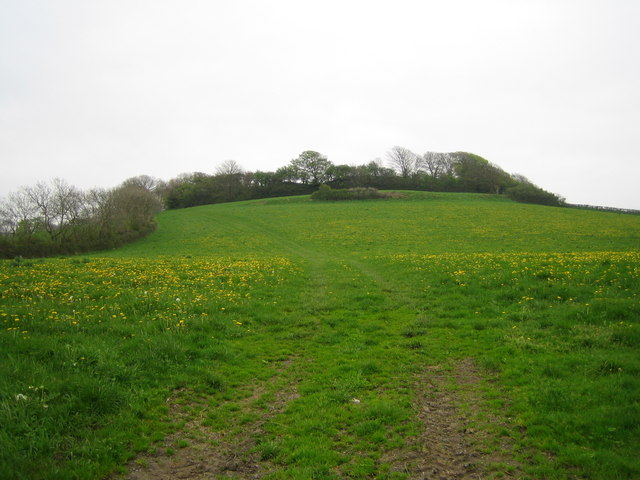
The Rath from a gateway on Tori-gwddwg Hill on the road from New Bridge to Crundale

Rudbaxton Rath is a hillfort within the community: a subcircular banked, ditched enclosure measuring around 100m by 95m; inside the western ramparts is a second enclosure of 50m by 32m.

== Listed and other buildings ==
The parish church of St Michael was originally established in the early 13th century and is a Grade I listed building. It is built of rubble stone with slate roofing, and retains some late-15th or early-16th century features. It was restored "from a state of ruin" by the rector in the 19th century.

Grade II listed buildings in the parish include several houses and two bridges. There are 14 listed buildings in the parish.

There are 49 buildings and other structures of interest listed by the Royal Commission on the Ancient and Historical Monuments of Wales within the community of Rudbaxton.

There is a Congregational chapel in Crundale, built in 1837, rebuilt in 1882 and modified in 1830.

== Notable people ==
- Lieutenant-general Sir Thomas Picton (1758–1815), born at Poyston, grew up at Poyston Hall in the parish. He died at the Battle of Waterloo.

== See also ==
- List of localities in Wales by population
