= Coastal Command Anti U-Boat Devices School RAF =

Former Royal Air Force Coastal Command training school

Coastal Command Anti U-Boat Devices School RAF ~~Loran Training Unit RAF~~ ~~No. 4 Refresher Flying Unit RAF~~ ~~No. 7 (Coastal) Operational Training Unit RAF~~ ~~No. 7 Operational Training Unit RAF~~
- Active: 15 June 1940 - 1 November 1940; 1 April 1942 - 25 August 1945
- Country: United Kingdom
- Branch: Royal Air Force
- Type: Operational Training Unit
- Role: Aircrew Training
- Part of: RAF Coastal Command
- Last base: RAF Limavady

Coastal Command Anti U-Boat Devices School RAF was a training unit of the Royal Air Force and part of RAF Coastal Command. The unit was established during April 1945 by the redesignating of an existing RAF Coastal Command unit. The unit had several different identities beforehand. It began as the short lived No. 7 Operational Training Unit which only existed during 1940, before reforming in 1942 as No. 7 (Coastal) Operational Training Unit. It disbanded and was redesignated a few more times before becoming the Coastal Command Anti U-Boat Devices School.

== History ==
The Coastal Command Anti U-Boat Devices School RAF was formed on 20 April 1945 at RAF Limavady. It operated the Vickers Wellington GR VIII, a British twin-engined, long-range medium bomber, until August 1945 and disbanded at RAF Limavady.

No. 7 Operational Training Unit

The School was initially No. 7 Operational Training Unit RAF which was formed on 15 June 1940 at RAF Hawarden operating a variety of aircraft including Supermarine Spitfire, a British single-seat fighter aircraft and Fairey Battle, a British single-engine light bomber aircraft. The unit was initially disbanded on 1 November 1940 to become No. 57 OTU.

No. 7 (Coastal) Operational Training Unit

The unit reformed on 1 April 1942 at RAF Limavady as No. 7 (Coastal) Operational Training Unit RAF using Vickers Wellington, long-range medium bomber aircraft and Avro Anson a British twin-engine, multi-role aircraft.

It started at half strength with a focus on training Vickers Wellington aircrew especially in torpedo training, and then in December 1942 the unit increased to full strength. The requirement around torpedo training had vastly reduced by August 1943, which meant the units size was decreased and in the November the unit lost its Preliminary Signals Training Flight to No. 12 Radio School RAF.

On 28 September, 1942, one of the units Canadian Wellingtons, HX448, went missing on a navigation exercise in the North Atlantic with its crew (Note: Sergeant T S White (RAF), Sergeant E R Hutton (RCAF), Sergeant J E Oatway (RCAF), Sergeant J R Coffee (RCAF), Sergeant J L T Chartier (RCAF), Sergeant H W Adams (RCAF)) eventually presumed dead. A Wellington crashed on uninhabited St Kilda sometime between 1942 and 1943, however, it was never identified and wasn't investigated until 1978 with a RCAF badge being found among the degraded wreckage leading some to assume it was HX448. However, another RCAF Wellington, LA995 of the 303 Ferry Training Unit also went missing in the same area on 23 February 1943.

No. 7 (C) OTU moved to RAF Haverfordwest on 4 January 1944 from RAF Limavady. The unit was tasked with both ASV radar, and Reconnaissance training. It operated with numerous types and variants of aircraft:

- Vickers Wellington IA, IC, VIII, XI, XIII & XIV
- Avro Anson I
- Westland Lysander III & IIIA
- Miles Magister
- de Havilland Tiger Moth II
- Miles Martinet I

The OTU was disbanded on 16 May 1944 at RAF Haverfordwest and was immediately redesignated No. 4 Refresher Flying Unit.

No. 4 Refresher Flying Unit

No. 4 Refresher Flying Unit was a short lived unit formed at RAF Haverfordwest on 16 May 1944. The newly formed unit had a secondary role on top of that of RAF Coastal Command aircrew training, the unit also moved aircraft around the UK to numerous other Coastal Command units. No. 4 RFU operated Vickers Wellington aircraft, operating variants: III, X, XI, XIII and XIV. The unit disbanded at RAF Mullaghmore on 5 October 1944 to become the Loran Training Unit.

Loran Training Unit

The United States built LORAN navigation system was at that time entering service with RAF Coastal Command. The Loran Training Unit was formed at RAF Mullaghmore by redesignating No. 4 Refresher Flying Unit on 5 October 1944. It operated Vickers Wellington XIII medium bomber aircraft, but was disbanded six months later, on 20 April 1945, to become the Coastal Command Anti U-Boat Devices School RAF.
