= Haverfordwest Airport =

Haverfordwest Airport Maes Awyr Hwlffordd
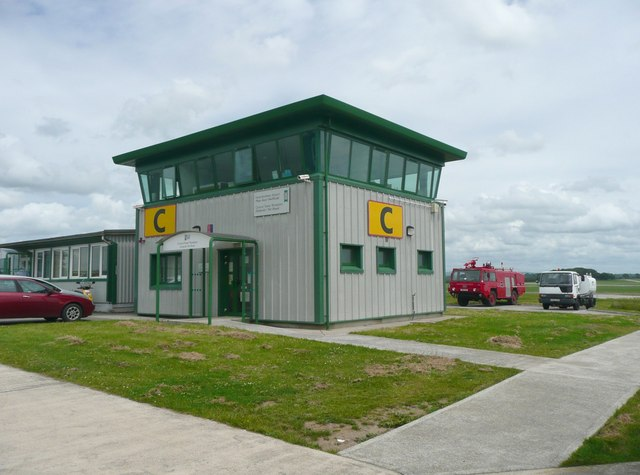
- IATA: HAW; ICAO: EGFE

Summary
- Airport type: Public
- Owner: Pembrokeshire County Council
- Operator: Haverfordwest Airport Limited
- Location: Rudbaxton, Pembrokeshire, Wales, UK
- Elevation AMSL: 159 ft (48 m)
- Coordinates: 51°49′59″N 004°57′40″W

Map
- Location in Pembrokeshire EGFE (the United Kingdom)

Runways
Direction	Length		Surface
Direction	m	ft	Surface
03/21	1,524	5,000	Asphalt
09/27	1,095	3,593	Asphalt
- Sources: UK AIP at NATS

Haverfordwest Airport (Welsh: Maes Awyr Hwlffordd) (IATA: HAW, ICAO: EGFE), also known as Withybush Airport, is a minor airport located 2 NM (3.7 km; 2.3 mi) north of Haverfordwest, Pembrokeshire. It is on the site of the former RAF Haverfordwest, which was operational between 1943 and 1945. Pembrokeshire County Council bought the site in the 1950s, and it has been a civil airfield since, with a number of other organisations also using it.

== Operations ==
Haverfordwest Airport has been licensed by the Civil Aviation Authority (CAA), since 1974. It has a CAA Ordinary Licence (Number P595) that allows flights for the public transport of passengers or for flying instruction, as authorised by the licensee, Pembrokeshire County Council. On 4 April 2025, the Council granted a lease to Haverfordwest Airport Limited to manage and operate the airport. Outside CAA-licensed opening hours, Haverfordwest operates unlicensed.

Fixed wing light aircraft experience flights and flying lessons are conducted by Fly Wales. The airport has two runways: 03/21 and 09/27.

The Royal Navy's Fleet Air Arm use the airport for refuelling their helicopters, when undertaking training exercises at the Pendine and Castlemartin ranges.

== Facilities ==
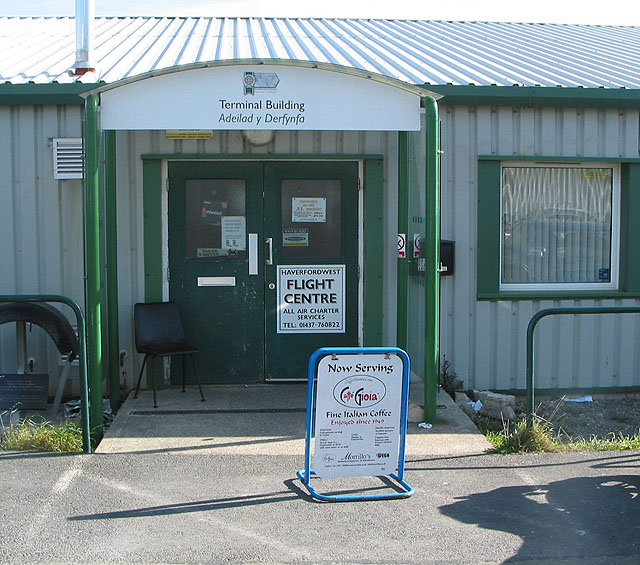
Terminal building at Haverfordwest (Withybush) Airport

The airport operates at RFS Category 1 for Rescue Fire Fighting Service. The firefighting vehicle fleet is two Isuzu D-Max TACR3 (a bespoke rapid response vehicle). It has an Abbreviated Precision approach path indicator (APAPIS) system of lights on the side of the airport runway, for visual descent guidance during final approach.

The airport operates an aircraft ground handling service. Jet A-1 and Avgas Aviation fuel can be obtained at the airport. Overnight hangarage is also available, and there is a Café which is open seven days a week.

== History ==
The airfield was officially opened in November 1942 for No. 17 Group RAF of RAF Coastal Command, but was not fully operational until the following year. The airfield had three runways: 04/22 5,100 feet, 17/35 3,780 feet and 10/28 3,600 feet, with connecting perimeter track and dispersal hard standings. It had two T2 hangars, a technical site and administration blocks. The accommodation blocks and other communal sites were situated just off the A40 road, in nearby fields.

=== RAF Coastal Command ===
The first unit to be based at RAF Haverfordwest was No. 3 (Coastal) Operational Training Unit RAF. It disbanded the same day in January 1943 as No. 7 (Coastal) Operational Training Unit RAF arrived, but this unit was later renamed in May, as No. 4 Refresher Flying Unit. Another unit based at the airfield at the time was the General Reconnaissance Aircraft Preparation Pool. No. 4 RFU was disbanded in September 1944. In January 1945 No. 8 (Coastal) Operational Training Unit RAF moved in to the airfield and stayed until June. The last units to leave Haverfordwest were Nos 20 and 21 Air Crew Holding Units, before the airfield closed in November 1945.

=== Pembrokeshire County Council ===
In 1949 a need for a civil airport in West Wales was identified. Haverfordwest Council put forward the ex-RAF airfield, to the Ministry of Transport, versus another Council's submission for ex-RAF Templeton. Minor alterations were required, but most of the initial infrastructure including runways was in better condition, and was therefore selected. Pembrokeshire County Council obtained Withybush airfield from the Air Ministry in 1952.

Proving flights took place by a number of companies. Varied types of aircraft were used including de Havilland Dragon Rapide, Douglas DC-3, Percival Proctor, and de Havilland Dove aircraft.

Cambrian Airways

On the 24 May 1952, Cambrian Airways began a twice daily scheduled service to Cardiff, ex-RAF Pengam Moors, using a de Havilland Dragon Rapide, registration G-AJCL. A stopover at Swansea Airport was later added. Cambrian Airways bought one of the Haverfordwest's T2 hangars. It was dismantled and then moved to Rhoose Airport for Cambrian's engineering department.

The service continued until 1955, when Cambrian Airways withdrew from the route. By 1958 the runways had deteriorated and when Morton Air Services wanted to set up a service from Pembrokeshire to Croydon they found the aerodrome to be unusable, so chose Brawdy instead.

Channel Airways

During the 1960s, Channel Airways planned an air ferry service between Haverfordwest and Cork, in Ireland. The airline added a concrete ramp to enable cars to be loaded into their Bristol B170 Freighter aircraft. It converted a Maycrete hut for use as a terminal building and a car park was constructed. The council funded the resurfacing of one of the runways along with other facilities for the airport. However, the airline cancelled the project and dismantled all the work it had done.

=== Dyfed County Council ===
Dyfed County Council was created on 1 April 1974 under the Local Government Act 1972, taking over the functions of Pembrokeshire. The aerodrome saw some redevelopment during the 1970s and 1980s. The World War II control tower was refurbished into an office. The engineering section was sold and became a number of small businesses. The West Wales Gliding Club was formed and regularly used the airfield. Various air taxis also continually used the airfield. A local air taxi, Welsh Airways, planned a regular scheduled service between Haverfordwest, Cardiff and London, but lacked the financial backing. Most of the remaining buildings were occupied by local companies, while the one remaining T2 hangar was used by an agriculture firm and on Sundays as a market. To support oil and gas exploration activities off the Welsh coast during 1974 and 1975, Air Swift (Wales), a subsidiary of the Blackbushe air taxi service, ran a service between Haverfordwest, Swansea and Cardiff.

The International Air Rally has previously used Haverfordwest. The aerodrome usually has two fly-ins each year, one in May and the second in August, along with the British Precision Pilots Association's (BPPA) Regional Competition held in June and October. The BPPA Rally is held after the June competition, and the initial event took place on the 9 August 1989. Sixty different aircraft from eighteen separate countries attended it.

=== Pembrokeshire County Council ===
Dyfed County Council was abolished under the Local Government (Wales) Act 1994, being replaced in April 1996 by a new Pembrokeshire County Council, covering the area where Haverfordwest is situated, and assuming ownership of the airport. Haverfordwest Airport movements were at ~10,000 per year, during the 1990s. More redevelopment saw a new operations room constructed in 1990 and this was followed by a new second hangar, in 1996. The airport profile was raised in 1996 when it was used to support the Marine Pollution Control Unit (MPCU) response for the Sea Empress oil spill.

On the 16 February 1996 the Sea Empress oil spill occurred at the entrance to the Milford Haven Waterway in Pembrokeshire, Wales, spilling over 70,000 tons of North Sea crude oil. The MPCU organises the UK response to oil spills and policy relies on dispersants. It had six Douglas DC-3 aircraft, under contract, converted for applying dispersants, with direction given from light aircraft. Air Atlantique specialised in operating classic aircraft. Its Douglas DC-3 Dakota flew from Haverfordwest Airport over the following two weeks dropping dispersant on the spill, before returning to the Air Atlantique base at Coventry Airport.

Redevelopment of the airport continued, in 2000 a new hangar, a small terminal waiting room and a café were constructed. In 2004 a new control tower opened. A review of the same year, 'Aviation in the UK', emphasised a need for a flexible air service in Wales. Cardiff would be the hub and Haverfordwest would be one of the satellite airfields.

Two new hangars have been built with parking aprons and a new apron in front of the terminal. One of the original runways has been upgraded, (04/22), which now has a permanent inset lightning system and APAPIS.

== See also ==
- RAF Haverfordwest
- List of airports in the United Kingdom and the British Crown Dependencies
