= Crundale, Pembrokeshire =

Village in Pembrokeshire, Wales

Coordinates: 51.825°N 4.945°W

Crundale
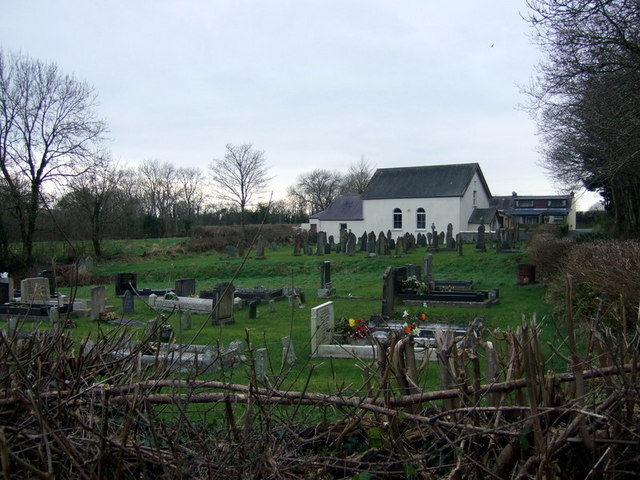
- Crundale United Reformed Church

- Location within Pembrokeshire
- Population: 584
- OS grid reference: SM9718
- Principal area: Pembrokeshire
- Country: Wales
- Sovereign state: United Kingdom
- Post town: Haverfordwest
- Postcode district: SA62
- Police: Dyfed-Powys
- Fire: Mid and West Wales
- Ambulance: Welsh
- UK Parliament: Preseli Pembrokeshire
- Senedd Cymru – Welsh Parliament: Preseli Pembrokeshire

Crundale is a village near Haverfordwest in south Pembrokeshire, southwest Wales. It is the principal residential area of Rudbaxton community. The population was around 584 in 2011.

== Location ==
Crundale lies on the rural B4329 road 1.5 miles (2.4 km) northeast of Haverfordwest and to the southeast of Withybush Airport.

== Description ==
The village is in the community of Rudbaxton, and is the main residential area in the community with some 450 houses and growing. The population of the community is about 750, and the village has a community hall and football pitch. The village Post Office closed in 2020, and was replaced by a mobile service on two weekdays at the community hall.

== History ==
Crundale House, dating from 1756 and from which the village may have taken its name, is now a guest house.

Crundale had an inn, the Boot & Shoe Inn, now closed and converted into residential properties.

In February 2013 an Adopted Local Development Plan was published by Pembrokeshire County Council.

== Religion ==
Crundale United Reformed Church dates back to 1837.

== Industry ==
In November 2013 Fenton Home Farm was granted approval to build a solar farm. The project, a joint British-German venture, took eight weeks to complete and began generating power on 12 September 2014. With a projected 37.8MW output of photovoltaic power, its operators believe it to be one of the largest in the UK.
