= Stewkley =

Village in Buckinghamshire, England

Coordinates: 51.9262°N 0.7610°W

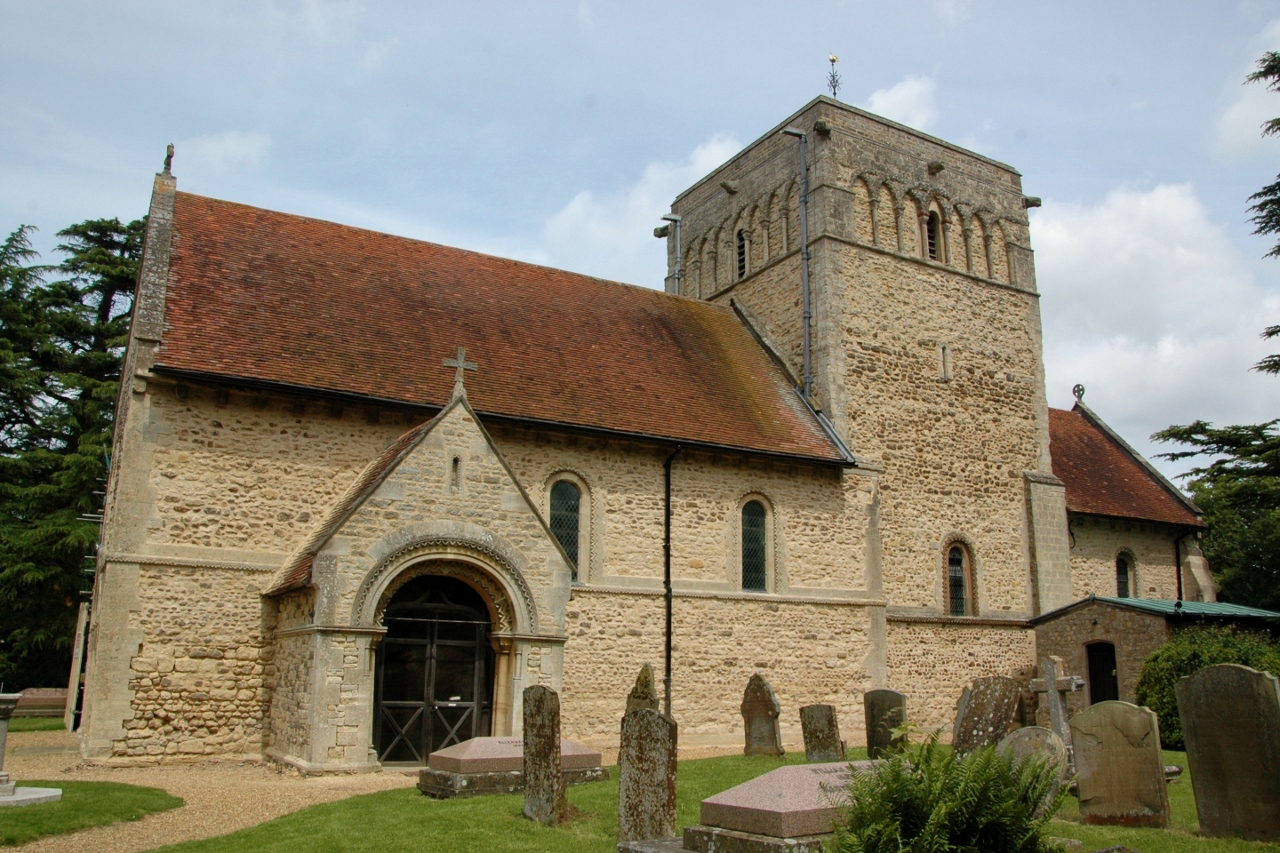
- St Michael & All Angels parish church

- Location within Buckinghamshire
- Population: 1,840 (2011 Census)
- OS grid reference: SP853261
- Civil parish: Stewkley
- Unitary authority: Buckinghamshire
- Ceremonial county: Buckinghamshire
- Region: South East
- Country: England
- Sovereign state: United Kingdom
- Post town: LEIGHTON BUZZARD
- Postcode district: LU7
- Dialling code: 01525
- Police: Thames Valley
- Fire: Buckinghamshire
- Ambulance: South Central
- UK Parliament: Buckingham and Bletchley
- Website: Stewkley Parish Council

Stewkley is a village and civil parish in Buckinghamshire, England. The village is about 5 miles (8 km) east of Winslow and about 4 miles (6 km) west of Leighton Buzzard. The civil parish includes the hamlets of North End and Stewkley Dean.

The toponym Stewkley is derived from the Old English for woodland clearing with tree stumps. The Domesday Book of 1086 records it as Stiuclai.

== History ==
The principal manor in Stewkley was once held by the son of Geoffrey Chaucer, who was an occasional visitor to the village. The Church of England parish church of St Michael and All Angels is one of the least-altered of England's 6,000 Norman churches. There is a Methodist chapel in High Street South. St Michael's Church of England Combined School teaches children aged 4–11.

Stewkley has one of, if not, the longest village high streets in Britain at 2 miles long, a title also claimed by Combe Martin in Devon, whose 1.5 mile (previously thought to be 2 miles) long high street is not as continuously populated as Stewkley's high street. Southeast of the village is Aylesbury Vale Golf Club.

In World War 2, the village was a popular destination for personnel serving at nearby RAF Wing.

== Campaign against London's third airport ==
In 1968 the Roskill Commission was charged with looking into finding a site for London's third airport. The report was published in 1970, with the proposal that Stewkley would be destroyed along with some other nearby villages. However two local residents, Desmond Fennell and Bill Manning, set up the Wing Airport Resistance Association (WARA), which successfully campaigned against the proposal. The Airport Monument and Spinney was erected in Stewkley to mark the successful campaign.

== Notable people ==
- Alastair Cook, England cricket captain, was married at the Methodist Chapel on 31 December 2011.
- Arthur Hughes, actor, known for his roles in The Innocents (2018) and The Archers.
- The Earl and Countess of Orkney lived at Tythe House.
- Darren Gough, former England cricketer, previously lived in and played football for the village.
- Al Murray, stand-up comedian, best known for his persona "The Pub Landlord", was born in Grove Cottage on High Street South.
