= RAF Barford St John =

Former RAF station in Oxfordshire, England

RAF Barford St John
- Near Bloxham, Oxfordshire in England
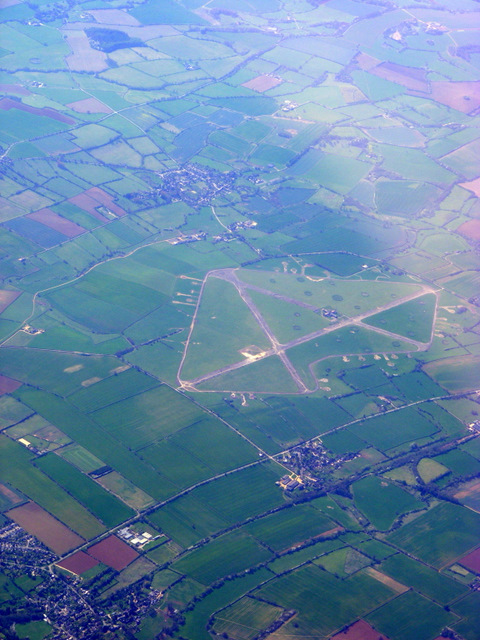
- Aerial view of RAF Barford St John during 2011

Site information
- Type: Royal Air Force station (US Visiting Forces)
- Code: BJ
- Owner: Ministry of Defence
- Operator: United States Air Force
- Controlled by: US Air Forces in Europe – Air Forces Africa formerly RAF Flying Training Command (1941-42); RAF Bomber Command * No. 92 (OTU) Group RAF
- Condition: Operational

Location
- Shown within Oxfordshire RAF Barford St John (the United Kingdom) RAF Barford St John (Europe)
- Coordinates: 52°00′13″N 001°21′36″W

Site history
- Built: 1941
- In use: 1941 – 1946 (Royal Air Force); 1951 – present (US Air Force)

Airfield information
- Elevation: 380 feet (116 m) AMSL
Runways
Direction	Length and surface
09/27	1,670 metres (5,479 ft) Asphalt
16/34	1,215 metres (3,986 ft) Asphalt
02/20	1,210 metres (3,970 ft) Asphalt
- Notes: Flying ceased in 1946

Royal Air Force Barford St John or more simply RAF Barford St John is a Royal Air Force station just north of the village of Barford St. John, Oxfordshire, England. It is now a non-flying facility, operated by the United States Air Force as a communications centre with many large communications aerials, and is a satellite of RAF Croughton.

== History ==
=== RAF use ===
RAF Barford St John was opened on 30 July 1941 as a training facility for RAF Flying Training Command. It had three grass runways, used primarily by Airspeed Oxfords of No. 15 Service Flying Training School RAF from RAF Kidlington. The airfield was rebuilt as an RAF Bomber Command airfield with paved runways and night operations equipment and reopened as a satellite for RAF Upper Heyford in December 1942. In 1943 the station served as flight test centre for its Gloster E.28/39 and Gloster Meteor jet aircraft. Bomber Command and No. 16 Operational Training Unit was stationed there with Vickers Wellingtons until December 1944. No. 1655 Mosquito Training Unit RAF replaced the Wellingtons at that time. After the war the airfield was closed in 1946 and placed into care and maintenance.

The site was used for some background filming for the 1949 film Twelve O'Clock High.

The following units were also there at some point:

- No. 4 Squadron RAF
- Satellite for No. 21 Heavy Glider Conversion Unit RAF (December 1944)
- No. 169 Squadron RAF
- No. 170 Squadron RAF

=== USAF use ===
In 1951 the United States Air Force opened a communications (transmitter) centre on the airfield. The site has a Scope Signal III installation which was used to modernize "Giant Talk", Strategic Air Command's world-wide command and controls network, which operates from RAF Croughton.

== See also ==
- List of Royal Air Force stations
- United States Air Forces in Europe – Air Forces Africa
