= RAF Chipping Warden =

RAF Chipping Warden
- Chipping Warden, Northamptonshire in England

Site information
- Type: Royal Air Force station Parent station
- Code: CW
- Owner: Air Ministry
- Operator: Royal Air Force
- Controlled by: RAF Bomber Command * No. 6 (T) Group RAF * No. 92 (OTU) Group RAF

Location
- Shown within Northamptonshire RAF Chipping Warden (the United Kingdom)
- Coordinates: 52°08′36″N 1°16′38″W

Site history
- Built: 1940/41
- In use: August 1941 -1953
- Battles/wars: European theatre of World War II

Airfield information
- Elevation: 139 metres (456 ft) AMSL
Runways
Direction	Length and surface
00/00	Concrete
00/00	Concrete
00/00	Concrete

Royal Air Force Chipping Warden or more simply RAF Chipping Warden was a Royal Air Force station located 6 miles (10 km) north-east of Banbury near the village of Chipping Warden, Northamptonshire, England.

The station was built in early 1941 and opened in July of that year. It had three concrete runways, several permanent hangars and a watch office with meteorology section.

== History ==
Throughout its operational history, the base was used by RAF Bomber Command. Between July 1941 and June 1945 it was used by No. 12 Operational Training Unit RAF, based at RAF Benson and part of No. 1 Group RAF. During this period Avro Anson and Vickers Wellington bombers operated from the airfield.

On 1 December 1942 a Vickers Wellington bomber crashed on take off, hitting the control tower and hangars, killing two people and causing many other casualties.

Between August 1945 and January 1946, the airfield was home to No. 10 Air Navigation School RAF. Until December 1946 the base was then used as a storage unit by No. 6 Maintenance Unit RAF at Brize Norton, and storing Airspeed Horsa gliders awaiting disposal. RAF Chipping Warden then closed until September 1952, when it became home to a Relief Landing Ground for No. 9 Advanced Flying Training School RAF (September 1952 - August 1953) which became No. 9 Flying Training School RAF (August - October 1953) until the airfield closed for a second time.

The following units were also here at some point:

- Satellite of No. 13 OTU ? - July 1945)
- No. 1517 (Beam Approach Training) Flight RAF (November 1942 - May 1945)

== Current use ==
The site is now the Appletree Trading Estate.

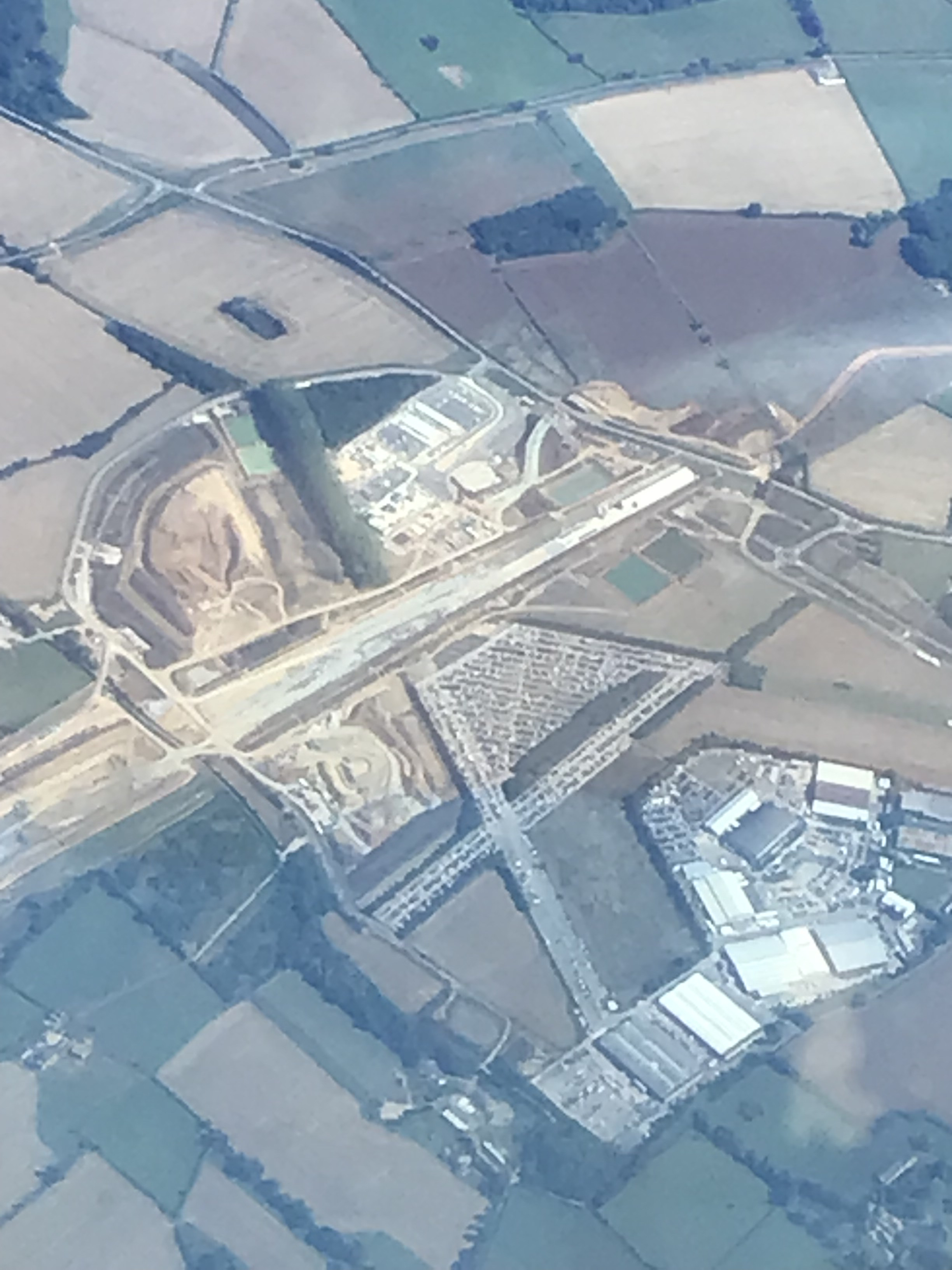
RAF Chipping Warden being bisected by the works for HS2 - September, 2022.

== See also ==
- List of former Royal Air Force stations
