= London's third airport =

Since the 1950s, London's primary passenger airport has been at Heathrow, with a second one at Gatwick. London's third airport may refer to:

- London City Airport
- London Stansted Airport
- Luton Airport
- The abandoned plans by the Commission on the Third London Airport for sites at Cublington, Foulness, Nuthampstead or Thurleigh
- various proposals for a Thames Estuary Airport.

== See also ==
- Airports of London
