= RAF Market Harborough =

Former Royal Air Force station

RAF Market Harborough
- Market Harborough, Leicestershire in England

Site information
- Type: Royal Air Force station
- Code: MB
- Owner: Air Ministry
- Operator: Royal Air Force
- Controlled by: RAF Bomber Command * No. 92 (OTU) Group RAF

Location
- Shown within Leicestershire RAF Market Harborough (the United Kingdom)
- Coordinates: 52°29′30″N 000°57′00″W

Site history
- Built: 1942
- Built by: J. Mowlem & Co Ltd
- In use: May 1943 - May 1947
- Battles/wars: European theatre of World War II

Airfield information
- Elevation: 110 metres (361 ft) AMSL
Runways
Direction	Length and surface
11/29	1,170 metres (3,839 ft) concrete
14/32	1,170 metres (3,839 ft) concrete
18/36	1,590 metres (5,217 ft) concrete

Royal Air Force Market Harborough or more simply RAF Market Harborough is a former Royal Air Force station near the town of Market Harborough in the county of Leicestershire, United Kingdom. Today part of the site of the former airbase is occupied by HMP Gartree.

== History ==
=== Construction & layout ===
Land for the development of an RAF aerodrome was earmarked by the Air Ministry in 1941, and work commenced on the construction of the Station during 1942. The construction work was undertaken by J.R. Mowlem & Co. and was completed in 1943.

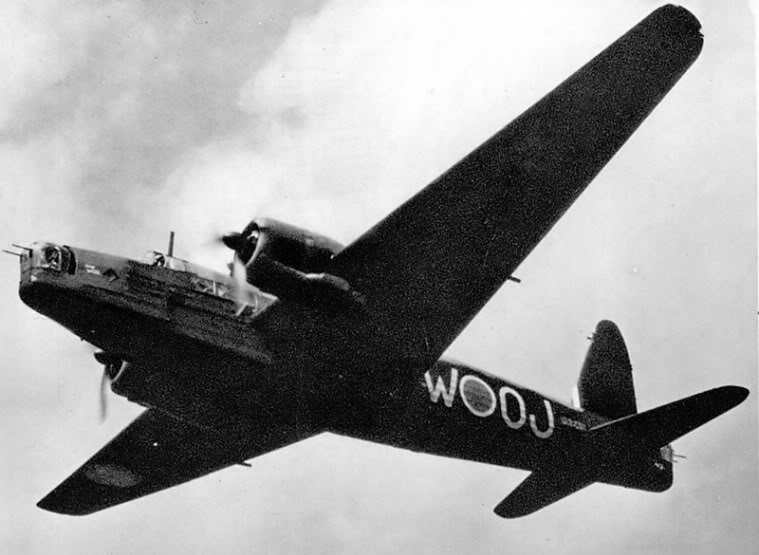
Vickers Wellingtons were by far the most numerous type operated from RAF Market Harborough

RAF Market Harborough conformed to the layout of a typical RAF aerodrome, that is the specifications set by the British Air Ministry which called for three converging strips, each containing a concrete runway optimally placed (if practicable at the site) at 60 degree angles to each other in a triangular pattern.

=== RAF Operational life ===
The first Royal Air Force personnel arrived on the Station on 1 June 1943. RAF Market Harborough came under the control of No. 92 Group RAF (Bomber Command), and became the parent Station to the nearby RAF Husbands Bosworth when that Station was commissioned in August of that year.

The complement of aircraft on the Stations as of 1943 is listed as 61 Vickers Wellingtons, 4 Miles Martinets and an Avro Anson. The Wellingtons were the primary training aircraft by that time largely withdrawn from front-line operations, the Martinets would have been used for the target towing operations and the Anson would have served as the Station's communication aircraft.

No. 14 Operational Training Unit

On 1 August 1943, No. 14 Operational Training Unit (No. 14 OTU) was re-formed at Market Harborough with the transfer of the unit from RAF Cottesmore. The OTU was tasked with the training of crews for RAF Bomber Command in both daylight and night operations. No.14 OTU continued to be housed on the Station until it was disbanded on 24 June 1945.

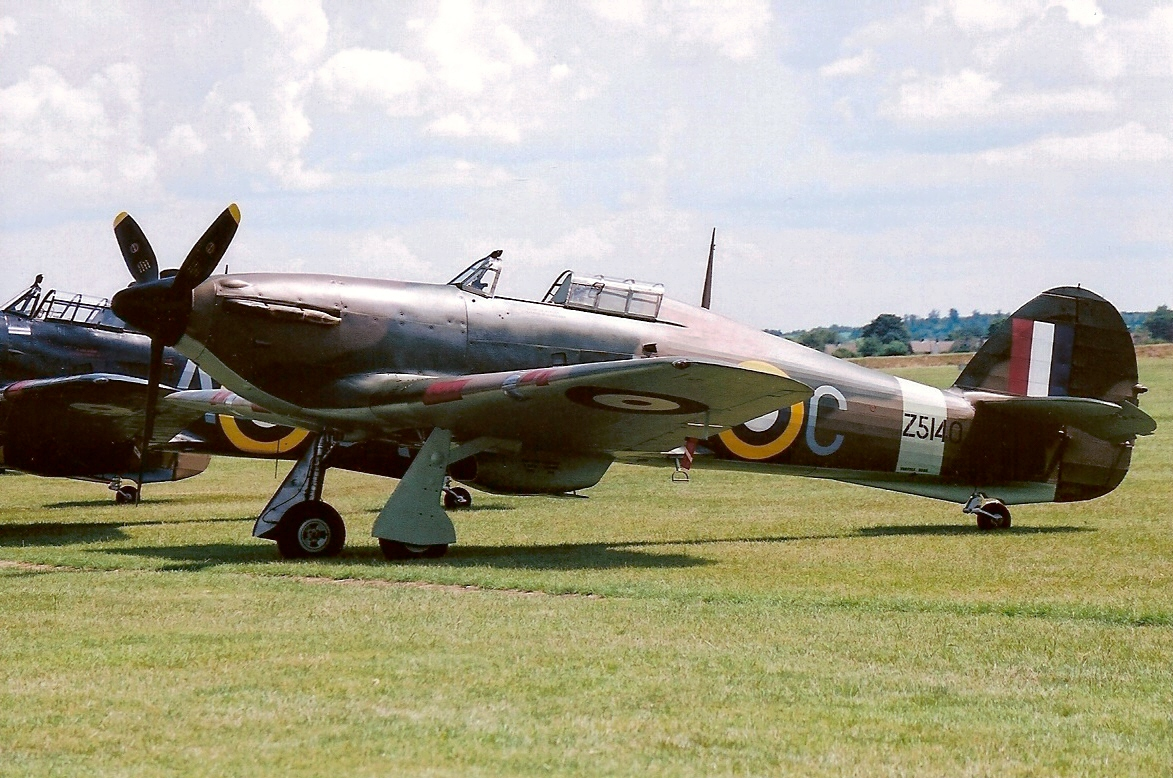
Hawker Hurricanes also operated from RAF Market Harborough with 1683 BDTF

No. 1683 (Bomber) Defence Training Flight

In addition to the Wellingtons of No.14 OTU, RAF Market Harborough also operated Hawker Hurricanes and Curtiss Tomahawks which comprised No. 1683 (Bomber) Defence Training Flight RAF (1683 BDTF). The Flight transferred from RAF Bruntingthorpe on 3 February 1944 and disbanded on 1 August 1944.

No. 26 Air Crew Holding Unit

Following the cessation of hostilities in 1945, RAF Market Harborough became home to No. 26 Air Crew Holding Unit from 21 August 1945 until 18 September 1946.

No. 273 Maintenance Unit

No. 273 Maintenance Unit RAF (No. 273 MU) were occupants of the base from February 1946 until 5 October 1949.

Care & Maintenance

Flying operations at RAF Market Harborough ceased on 18 August 1945, following which the airfield was placed on care and maintenance managed by No. 273 MU.

=== British Army ===
Control of the former RAF Market Harborough was transferred to the British Army in 1948, the Station becoming known as 72 Brigade Vehicle Depot (72 BVD). The army retained custody of the Station until they finally left in the late 1950s.

== Today ==
Because of the proximity of HMP Gartree, no aviation activity now takes place on the site and today it is largely used for agricultural purposes. In 1990 an application was submitted to develop some of the site into a cattle market on the area known as Airfield Farm. In the mid 1990s a further application was submitted to convert some of the land for offices, leisure facilities and an agricultural showground. In the late 1990s a further ideas concerned a Christian theme park together with a recreation of the Garden of Eden.

=== HMP Gartree ===
Following the cessation of military activity on the site at the end of the 1950s, part of the former RAF Market Harborough was earmarked for the construction of HMP Gartree in the 1960s.

Opening in 1965, HMP Gartree was initially used as s Category C training center before it was upgraded to a maximum security facility. The most notorious episode occurred in December 1987 and concerned the escape of two inmates who were helped with the aid of a hijacked Bell 206 helicopter. Today the prison houses Category B prisoners.
