= Eustace Roskill, Baron Roskill =

British lawyer and public servant

The Right Honourable The Lord Roskill PC

Lord of Appeal in Ordinary
- In office 1980–1986

Personal details
- Born: Eustace Wentworth Roskill; 6 February 1911 London, United Kingdom
- Died: 3 October 1996 (aged 85) Reading, Berkshire, United Kingdom
- Spouse: Elisabeth Roskill (m. 1947)
- Children: 3
- Education: Exeter College, Oxford

Eustace Wentworth Roskill, Baron Roskill, PC (6 February 1911 – 3 October 1996) was a British barrister and judge.

== Background and education ==
Roskill was the youngest of four sons of John Roskill KC. His mother Sybil was the daughter of the traveller and politician Ashton Wentworth Dilke. Roskill's oldest brother was Sir Ashton Roskill QC; another older brother Stephen was a Royal Navy officer and historian. He was educated as an exhibitioner at Winchester College and went then to Exeter College, Oxford, where he graduated first class with a Bachelor of Arts in 1932, winning an honorary scholarship in modern history. Roskill studied afterwards as a Harmsworth Law Scholar at the Middle Temple and was called to the bar in 1933. Thereafter he worked at the Commercial Bar.

== Career ==
With the beginning of the Second World War in 1939, Roskill, having previously suffered from tuberculosis, was not conscripted into active service, but became employed at the Ministry of Shipping until 1941 and subsequently at its successor the Ministry of War Transport until the end of the war in 1945. He was nominated a Justice of the Peace in 1950, assigned to Hampshire and became deputy chairman of the county's Quarter Sessions in the year thereafter. Roskill was appointed a Queen's Counsel in 1953 and chaired the Quarter Session from 1960. A year later he became Commissioner of Assize, serving in Birmingham, and was elected a bencher by the Middle Temple.

In 1962 Roskill received an appointment as judge on the High Court of Justice (Queen's Bench Division) and was therefore knighted. He became the new president of the Senate of the Inns of Court and the Bar, when it was formed in 1967. Roskill filled a vacancy as Lord Justice of Appeal in 1971 and on this occasion was sworn of the Privy Council. Following the death of Reginald Manningham-Buller, 1st Viscount Dilhorne in 1980, he replaced him as Lord of Appeal in Ordinary, receiving the usual life peerage with the title Baron Roskill, of Newtown, in the County of Hampshire. Six years later he retired.

From 1957 Roskill chaired the trust of the Horris Hill School. When the Parole Board for England and Wales was established in 1968, he was chosen as its first vice-chairman. From 1968 to 1971 he chaired the Roskill Commission (formally the Commission on the Third London Airport) which recommended Cublington in Buckinghamshire as the site of a new airport for London.

During his time as Lord of Appeal he sat in the Appellate Committee as well as in the Judicial Committee of the Privy Council. After his retirement in 1986, Roskill chaired the Fraud Trials Committee and a year later became also chairman of the appeals committee of the Panel on Takeovers and Mergers, a position he held until 1993. In his last years he served as an arbitrator.

== Family ==
In 1947, he married Elisabeth, third daughter of Thomas Frame Jackson; the couple had a son and two daughters. Roskill died at Reading, Berkshire in 1996. Lady Roskill died in January 2014.

== Arms ==
Coat of arms of Eustace Roskill, Baron Roskill
Escutcheon Gules a lion rampant quarterly Argent and Or in chief two green woodpeckers respectant Proper.
