= RAF Wing =

Former RAF base in Buckinghamshire, England

RAF Wing
- Near Wing, Buckinghamshire in England
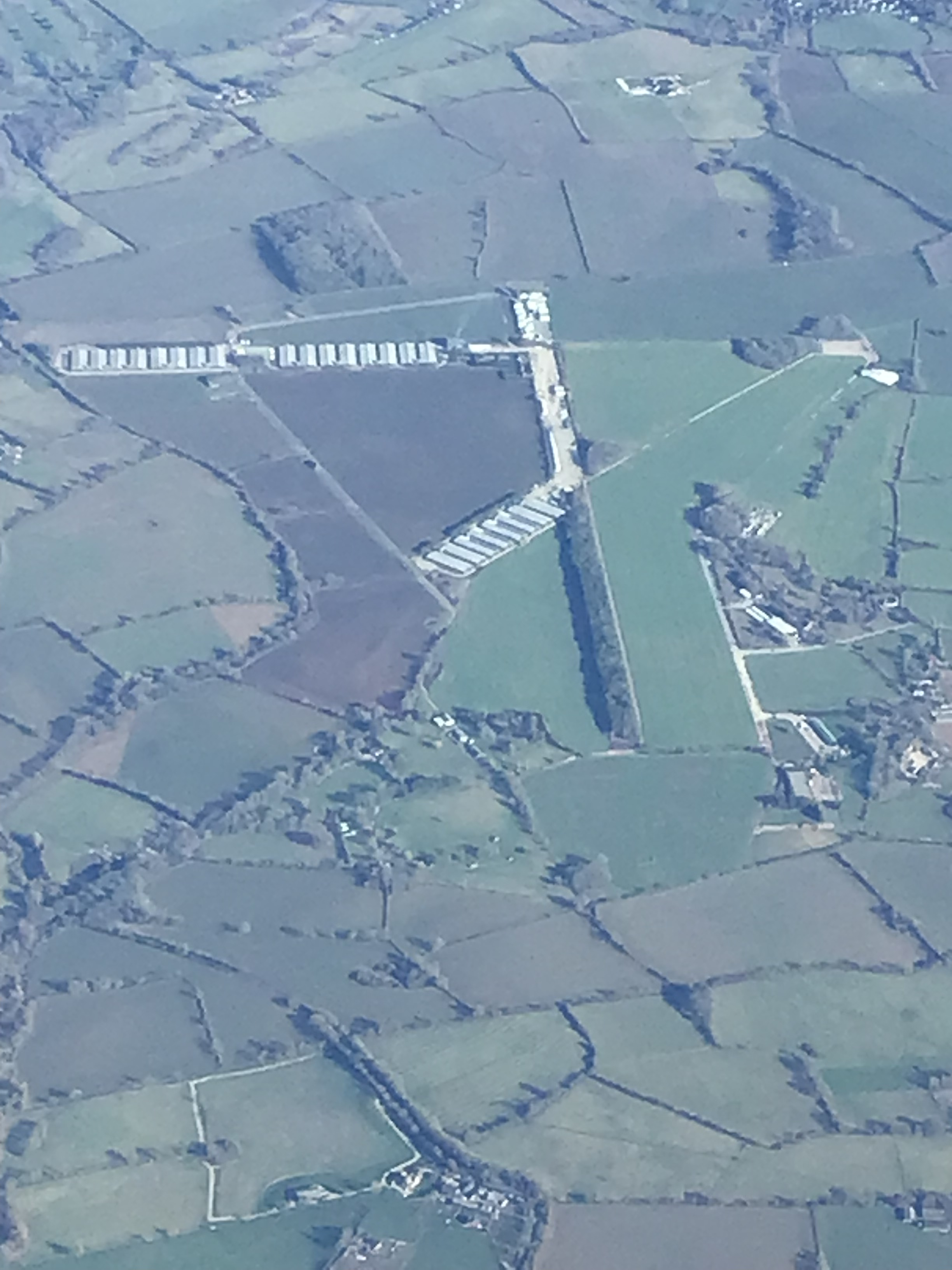

Site information
- Type: Royal Air Force station
- Code: UX
- Owner: Air Ministry
- Operator: Royal Air Force
- Controlled by: RAF Bomber Command * No. 7 (T) Group RAF * No. 92 (OTU) Group RAF

Location
- Shown within Buckinghamshire RAF Wing (the United Kingdom)
- Coordinates: 51°54′11″N 000°44′54″W

Site history
- Built: 1940/41
- In use: November 1941 - April 1960
- Battles/wars: European theatre of World War II

Airfield information
- Elevation: 143 metres (469 ft) AMSL
Runways
Direction	Length and surface
00/00	Concrete
00/00	Concrete
00/00	Concrete

Royal Air Force Wing or more simply RAF Wing is a former Royal Air Force station, situated just west of the village of Wing, in the Aylesbury Vale district of Buckinghamshire, England.

== History ==
=== Construction ===
RAF Wing was built on a parcel of land between North Cottesloe and South Cottesloe. Construction included five hangars for the aircraft, three concrete runways, offices, a canteen, rest rooms, blast shelters, ammunition and bomb dumps, radio and telegraph rooms, a library, Link trainer, gunnery and Celestial Navigation training rooms, a chapel, gym, squash court, rugby and football field, tailors, barbers, shoemakers, Post Office, a cinema, and stores. The main entrance to the airfield was via an already existing farm lane off Cublington Road, where a guardhouse was constructed. This road passed through the Instructional Site and on to the Technical Site. It now leads directly to the airfield memorial (see later item).

Opposite the main entrance is the lane leading to the Communal Site, on which the gym and a few other airfield facilities still survive as business units. The original Church of England chapel has recently been replaced by a metal industrial building, but still sits on the same foundations. The chapel was dedicated on November 1, 1942, by the Bishop of Buckingham, the Right Reverend Philip Eliot, in a service with commanding officers from the overall 92 Group and from RAF Wing. The Bishop was accompanied in the service by Group Captain J.F. Cox who was the Assistant Chaplain General and would in 1943 become appointed as an Honorary Chaplain to the King.

Further down Cublington Road towards the village of Cublington, another entrance gave direct access to hangars and stores at the western end of the main runway and a direct route to the bomb and ammunition dumps.

By 1944, over two and a half thousand personnel were stationed on site - approximately 2000 men and 500 women. Thirteen sites of living quarters were erected and dispersed over a wide area, each with up to 20 Nissen huts, some toilets, and one or two air-raid shelters. Members of the Women's Auxiliary Air Force had their own site close to Wing village on Cublington Road, much of which can still be seen today. There was also a hospital and mortuary constructed close to Cublington that is still partially standing. A new sewage works was also constructed just south of Cublington Road to serve the airfield and its associated sites. These sewage works still exist today and serve local communities.

=== Operations ===
RAF Wing airfield opened on 17 November 1941, although the upgraded runways were not finished and the first flight was not until March 1942. The station was used primarily as a ‘crewing up’ and operational training facility, but Bullseye, Nickel Raids and operational missions were also flown including participation in the majority of the ‘Thousand Bomber Raids’ during which multiple crews and aircraft from the unit were lost. No. 26 Operational Training Unit RAF for Bomber Command was formed at Wing on 15 January 1942 as a 2/3 status unit (means the unit was formed with one less flight than other OTU's) within No. 7 Group, equipped with Vickers Wellingtons, Avro Ansons and six Hawker Hurricane fighters to train night bomber crews.

The two operational squadrons who came for a short period were No. 268 Squadron RAF and No. 613 Squadron RAF. 613 Squadron arrived on 1 March 1943 with North American Mustangs, and 268 joined a day later with the same type of aircraft. On 6 March 1943, 268 Squadron left, and 613 Squadron left one day later, going to RAF Bottisham.

RAF Cheddington opened in March 1942 as the early satellite station to RAF Wing, but this was soon replaced by a dedicated airfield, RAF Little Horwood which was constructed a few miles north-west of RAF Wing. RAF Little Horwood also housed part of the Special Operations Executive, whose work included building radio devices for the resistance and covert agents and dropping them into occupied Europe. A Q-type decoy airfield was constructed between Wingrave and Rowsham just off the Aylesbury to Wing road to confuse enemy bombers.

In April and May 1945, RAF Wing was given orders to become a key gateway for Operation Exodus, which involved the repatriation of allied prisoners of war from the European theatre. 1,269 flights landed at RAF Wing, bringing back nearly 33,000 allied prisoners of war from over 21 nations. The main aircraft landing were Lancasters, Stirlings and Dakotas, with the operational records recording them coming in so regularly that the landing aircraft were unable to clear the runway before the next one arrived. A plaque commemorating the event now sits on the main airfield memorial.

=== Nearby activity ===
The airmen cycled to local pubs in Wing, Stewkley, Cheddington and Cublington in the evenings or to the local train stations in Leighton Buzzard, Winslow and Swanbourne on their days off so they could go home and see their families. Often entertainment was put on at the airfield as well, such as dancing, theatre productions and films shown at the station cinema. Cricket was a regular pastime, hosted at the Rothschild Ascott House between Wing and Leighton Buzzard.

There were also regular dances at Wing and Stewkley village hall, and a wide range of entertainment available in nearby Leighton Buzzard, which housed thousands of other RAF personnel involved with Bletchley Park, RAF Leighton Buzzard (later RAF Stanbridge) and Radar Command Headquarters.

=== Wartime incidents ===
- On 12 September 1942, the prototype Martin-Baker MB 3 fighter, R2492, crashed on its tenth flight after its engine seized shortly after takeoff from RAF Wing at a height of around 100 feet. A crank on one of the Napier Sabre II's sleeve valves had failed. While trying to land in a field without power, Captain Valentine Baker (Company manager, aircraft-designer and test pilot) was forced to turn to port and his wing clipped a hay pile, cartwheeled through a hedge and burst into flames on land now occupied by the Aylesbury Vale Golf Club, killing him. A memorial to Captain Valentine ‘Bake’ Baker was installed at the golf club in 2021 after the crash site was discovered by local aviation researchers in December 2020. The memorial consists of a plaque, information board, pieces of wreckage, a commemorative bust and the main function room is now named ‘The Captain Valentine Baker Suite’. The MB 3 had arrived at RAF Wing for trials in August.
- On 5 February 1943, Sergeant Sidney John Dean (1385334) was the Bombardier aboard Wellington Mk.Ic Z8970 which had completed a night training exercise. After the aircraft taxyed to the dispersal and came to a halt, the bombardier left the aircraft by the front underneath exit without the pilots knowledge to place chocks under wheels. He was struck by the port propeller and died of his injuries on the airfield at 0640. Sidney was formally pronounced dead at the RAF Hospital at Halton, Buckinghamshire and his death registered in Aylesbury, Buckinghamshire. He is buried at Saint Andrews Graveyard, Sonning, Berkshire.
- On the night of 3/4 June 1943, a Vickers Wellington Type 440 B Mk. X bomber, HE746, of 26 OTU, RAF, was on a flight from RAF Wing, departing there at 2340 hrs, when it suffered a failure to one of its Bristol Hercules engines. "The crew advised flying control at RAF Dumfries of their situation and requested an emergency landing; unfortunately the aircraft crashed 2 miles from the airfield runway." Three of the crew were killed and two others were seriously injured. This aircraft was to become the catalyst for the foundation of the Dumfries and Galloway Aviation Museum.
- On the night of 23 September 1943, B-17 Flying Fortress 42-3449 WW-X piloted by Immanuel J Klette (Manny Klette) crashed in a wood just short of the RAF Wing runway, while returning battled damaged from flak, on one engine and with little fuel after a bombing mission to Nantes, France. The crew survived, but Klette and his Navigator were badly injured. Rehabilitated at RAF Halton and at the Churchill Hospital Oxford, Lt. Col Klette went on to fly more missions than any other USAAF bomber pilot and was buried with full military honours at Arlington Cemetery. A plaque to the incident has been mounted in the private wood by the landowner and an aviation researcher.
- One of the five hangars was destroyed when Wellington HE854 crashed on 9 June 1944 while taking off to complete a flying test, killing its two crew (Harry Wilkes DFM 156139 & Francis ‘Dickie’ Hubbard 161253), two WAAFs (Emily Dickens 2021702 & Ann Reeves 2025511) and a male member of maintenance unit crew (Corporal Harold ‘Frank’ Hoare 32810). Two Wellington aircraft (HE854 & HE786) were destroyed in the subsequent fire along with a Queen Mary transporter that had a Tomahawk fighter on its trailer.

=== Closure ===
RAF Wing was closed 4 April 1956.

=== After closure ===
Soon after closing, all the hangars were removed. In the late 1950s, a large battery chicken farm was built on the northern end of the north-south runway. In the early 1960s, a large pig breeding farm, operated by Anglian Pig Breeders, was established on the airfield, occupying some of the old RAF buildings: new sheds were erected on the sites of old hangars and large open air pig pens in other areas of the airfield. This farm ceased trading in the mid 1960s. During this period, a section of runway at the south eastern side of the airfield was dug up and removed. A model aircraft club used the western end of the main runway in the 1960s, but that too was dug up and removed a few years later. The control tower, located south of the east-west runway, remained in a derelict state for many years before being demolished in the 1970s. In the 1980s part of the airfield was used as a testing station for containers of oxygen and other gases.

==== RAF Wing Memorial ====
In June 2021, Greg Smith (Member of Parliament for Buckingham) and Lynn Taylor Overend (daughter of RAF Wing veteran and Physical Training Instructor Eric Taylor) unveiled a memorial to those who served and flew at RAF Wing. The three walled brick built memorial sits by the perimeter track where the main parades took place, and just across from the old main runway. It has individual aluminium plaques to No.26 Operational Training Unit, to the final take off site of Captain Valentine Baker and the ill fated Martin Baker MB3 aircraft in 1942 and to the major repatriation role played by the airfield in 1945 in Operation Exodus. The memorial site was donated by an airfield farmer, the project funded by the local citizen and business community and led by local resident Nick Ellins and the Aircrew Remembrance Society. Remembrance plaques are also mounted on the memorial fence to those killed at the airfield itself, including to Sergeant Sidney John Dean who died nearby in February 1943 (see Wartime Incidents above) and to the five killed nearby, when Wellington HE854 crashed in June 1944. Two aircrew, two WAAFs and one male ground personnel were killed in the incident - See Wartime Incidents. A further remembrance plaque, bust and information board have been installed by Nick Ellins, the Martin-Baker Aircraft Company and the Aylesbury Vale Golf Club at the nearby crash site of Captain Valentine Baker and the Martin-Baker MB3, and another by Nick Ellins and farmer Henry Hunt at the 1943 crash site of the B-17 Flying Fortress piloted by legendary American aviator Immanuel J Klette - See Wartime Incidents.

=== London Airport ===
In the late 1960s the former airfield was considered for the site of the third London Airport following a publication of a report by the Roskill Commission. Wing (officially referred to as Cublington in the report), was considered to be ideally situated for access from all parts of the country and only fifty miles from London. Within a few days of Wing being identified as a possible site a local airport resistance association was formed to oppose the airport. A public inquiry was opened at Aylesbury on 14 July 1969 after a protest by 2,000 people through Aylesbury. As a result of the protest and also revised government thinking, the new airport plan was abandoned. As a permanent celebration of the victory, Buckinghamshire County Council planted a spinney of over 400 trees and a monument on a 3-acre site that would have been at the centre of the airport that would have dwarfed Heathrow in size.

== RAF units and aircraft ==
Unit	Dates	Aircraft	Variant	Notes
No. 268 Squadron RAF	1943	North American Mustang	I	Based for a few days in March 1943
No. 613 Squadron RAF	1943	North American Mustang	I	Based for a few days in March 1943
No. 26 Operational Training Unit RAF	1942-1946	Vickers Wellington		Also operated a wide range of training and support aircraft, for example the Avro Anson, carried out operational sorties in 1942.
No. 60 Group Communications Flight	1945-1946	Vickers Wellington		Also operate a DH Tiger Moth and a DH Moth Minor
No. 60 Group Radar Nav Aids Test Flight	1945	Vickers Wellington	X	
No. 282 Maintenance Unit RAF	1952-1954	None		Explosives Storage - Operated from 1952-1954 as a sub-site, transferred to the USAF in 1954.

== Modern day ==
Most of the former airfield has been returned to agriculture. As of 2018, all ex RAF buildings on the airfield site have been removed apart from the former gymnasium and outbuildings at the Communal Site, parts of the hospital and mortuary infrastructure at the Sick Quarters site, store and transport workshop buildings located by South Tinkers Hole Farm used by the old pig farm and parts of the incendiary and bomb facility known as the Bomb Store. Of the original runways (that have not been built on) approximately half of the main runway still exists; its eastern end used as an articulated lorry trailer park. A few Sections of the slabbed concrete perimeter road and taxiways still exist and the airfield memorial now sits on one. The old ammunition dump, just north of the western end of the main runway, is now a private ornamental lake. Opposite the main airfield entrance on Cublington Road is a lane leading to the gym. This building is still in existence and there is a sign on Cublington Road that reads: 'The Old Gymnasium'. Further down Cublington Road towards the village of Cublington are the remains of barracks that were built near the sewage works, with the concrete bases of all eight barrack buildings and concrete pathways still there.

== Motto ==
The motto written on the Navigation Section at Wing was "MAN IS NOT LOST". Someone had written graffiti underneath this: "But occasionally is completely unaware of his exact location".
