= Frant =

Village and parish in East Sussex, England

Coordinates: 51°05′46″N 0°16′16″E

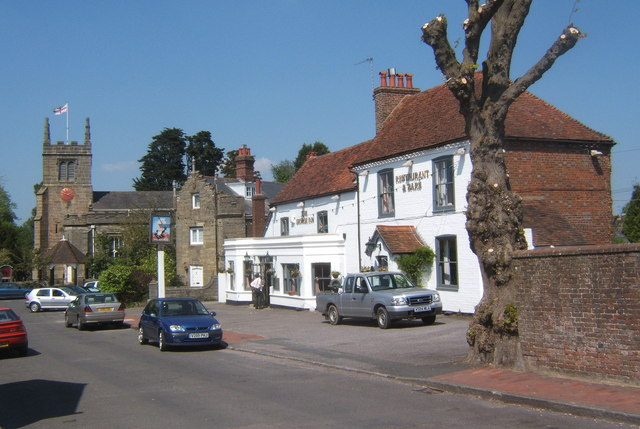
- A view of Frant

- Location within East Sussex
- Area: 31.9 km^{2} (12.3 sq mi)
- Population: 1,645 (2011)
  - Density: 111/sq mi (43/km^{2})
- OS grid reference: TQ590354
  - London: 33 miles (53 km) NNW
- District: Wealden
- Shire county: East Sussex
- Region: South East
- Country: England
- Sovereign state: United Kingdom
- Post town: TUNBRIDGE WELLS
- Postcode district: TN3
- Dialling code: 01892
- Police: Sussex
- Fire: East Sussex
- Ambulance: South East Coast
- UK Parliament: Sussex Weald
- Website: http://www.frant.info/

Frant is a village and civil parish in the Wealden District of East Sussex, England, on the Kentish border about three miles (5 km) south of Royal Tunbridge Wells.

When the iron industry was at its height, much of the village was owned by ironmasters. Smuggling occurred here in the 17th and 18th centuries, and one of the turnpike roads (now the A267) came through here at that time.

Frant church is dedicated to St Alban and there is a church school. St Alban's Frant was a major surveying point for the Anglo-French Survey (1784–1790) calculating the precise distance and relationship between the Paris Observatory and the Royal Greenwich Observatory, undertaken by General William Roy.

There are three public houses in the parish: the Abergavenny Arms on the A267 in Frant, the George Inn in the High Street and the Brecknock Arms at Bells Yew Green. The George Inn plays host to the Sloe Gin World Championships each December, attracting entries from around the globe.

Lieutenant-Colonel John By, the Royal Engineer who headed the Rideau Canal project in Ottawa, 1826–1832, is buried here. He was also the builder of Bytown, which became Ottawa, the capital of Canada.

== History ==
Frant is an ancient village and some of its Victorian buildings (the old Frant Church of England Primary School and other High Street buildings) still stand. Although it was not mentioned in the Domesday Book of 1086, a settlement certainly predates the Norman Conquest; indeed, excavations in 1929 by S. E. Winbolt uncovered pottery fragments and ironworkings that indicated the presence of a settlement dating back to 100 BC. There is also evidence that a pre-Norman road, with military posts, ran from Frant to Crowborough.

The first mention of an area within the parish was in 742, when the Saxon chief Æðelberht granted the manor of Ridrefelde (Rotherfield) and Ramslye to the Abbey of St Denis in France; though part of Royal Tunbridge Wells today, Ramslye was at the time part of the parish of Frant.

Broadwater Down was part of Frant parish until 1894, when it became part of Tunbridge Wells in Kent.

The village was within the Rape of Pevensey and the hundred of Rotherfield.

=== Toponymy ===
From the 12th century onwards Frant appears in charters and records, in as diverse spellings as Fernet, Fernthe, Fernth, Ferthe, Ferring, Vernthe, Franthe, Fraunte, Feruthe, Frenthe and Fant; these variations notwithstanding, the etymology of the name has its roots in the Anglo-Saxon meaning "place of the fern" or "place of the bracken", a reflection of the verdant countryside around the settlement.

=== Research institute ===
The Wellcome Veterinary Research Station was established in the 1940s, and conducted important work during the war, for the Far East campaign. It made the vaccine for Scrub typhus.

The site was 325 acres. It was set up by Sam Hignett, who died in March 1994, aged 85. It was on the Ely Grange Estate, owned by George Gee. George Gee (1888-1943) was managing director and chairman of the Derbyshire construction company Gee, Walker & Slater Ltd. He died at Little Horwood in Buckinghamshire on February 24 1943, aged 55. He was a millionaire. His company built the neighbouring RAF Little Horwood. Wellcome bought the site in November 1943.

Robert Francis Montgomerie (1898- December 14 1968) was educated at Rothesay Academy, and was the head of veterinary research at Wellcome. Wellcome sold the site in 1973, and it became a site for racing greyhound kennels. Research of Wellcome moved to the Cooper Research Station in Dacorum in Hertfordshire.

== Governance ==
Frant is part of Wealden District and, along with Withyham, makes up one of the District's 35 wards. The population of this ward (called Frant/Withyham) at the 2011 census was 5,274. The ward contributes two of the District's 55 Councillors.

The Member of Parliament for Wealden is the Conservative Nus Ghani. She was elected in 2015 with a majority of 22,967.

== Geography ==
Frant is just inside the border of East Sussex with Kent, about three miles (5 km) south of Tunbridge Wells and 36 miles (58 km) south of London.

The village is at the northern edge of the High Weald, a ridge of hard sandstone that runs across southern England from Hampshire along the borders of Surrey, West Sussex, East Sussex and Kent. The River Teise, a tributary of the Medway, runs through the parish.

There are a number of Sites of Special Scientific Interest within the parish. Eridge Park is a site of biological interest, consisting of park and ancient woodland, hosting a wide variety of flora and fauna. The site encloses the National Trust reserve known as Nap Wood. Eridge Green is an area of ancient woodland with outcrops of sandstone that hosts some unusual fauna. Another site is High Rocks, an area of geological interest due to the weathering patterns of the local sandstone.

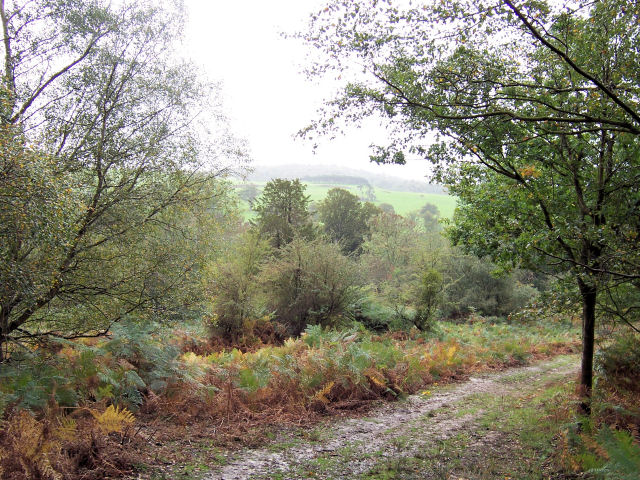
Path in Whitehill Wood, Eridge Park

== Demography ==
The population of Frant rose steadily from just under 1,100 in 1801 to a peak in 1891 of around 3,500. The records show a marked drop to 1,692 in 1901, but this is due to the transfer of the Broadwater Down parish to Tunbridge Wells that took place in 1894. Over the course of the 20th century the number of people living in the parish has declined slowly, and a 2007 estimate by East Sussex County Council put the population of Frant at 1,367.

Population of Frant
Year	1801	1811	1821	1831	1841	1851	1861	1871	1881	1891
Population	1090	1439	1727	2071	2280	2447	2469	3263	3481	3565
Year	1901	1911	1921	1931	1941	1951	1961	1971	1981	1991
Population	1692	1671	1621	1604	?	1513	1445	1403	?	?
Year	2001	2007								
Population	1387	1367								

== Transport ==
Frant is on the A267, which runs south from Tunbridge Wells to Hailsham. The B2099, which branches off the A267 just south of the village, runs south east to Wadhurst.

The village is served by Frant railway station which is located on the Hastings Line in the hamlet of Bells Yew Green, approximately 1.2 miles from the village. The station is served by hourly Southeastern services (half-hourly during the peak hours) between Hastings and London Charing Cross.

The village is also served by the Stagecoach South East bus routes 51 and 254. These buses provide connections to Tunbridge Wells, Heathfield and Hawkhurst.

== See also ==
Listed buildings in Frant
