= No. 76 Operational Training Unit RAF =

No. 76 Operational Training Unit RAF 76 OTU
- Active: 1 October 1943 - 30 July 1945
- Country: United Kingdom
- Branch: Royal Air Force
- Type: Training
- Role: RAF operational training
- Garrison/HQ: RAF Aqir, British Mandate of Palestine
- Nickname(s): 76 OTU
- Engagements: Second World War

Aircraft flown
- Bomber: Vickers Wellington

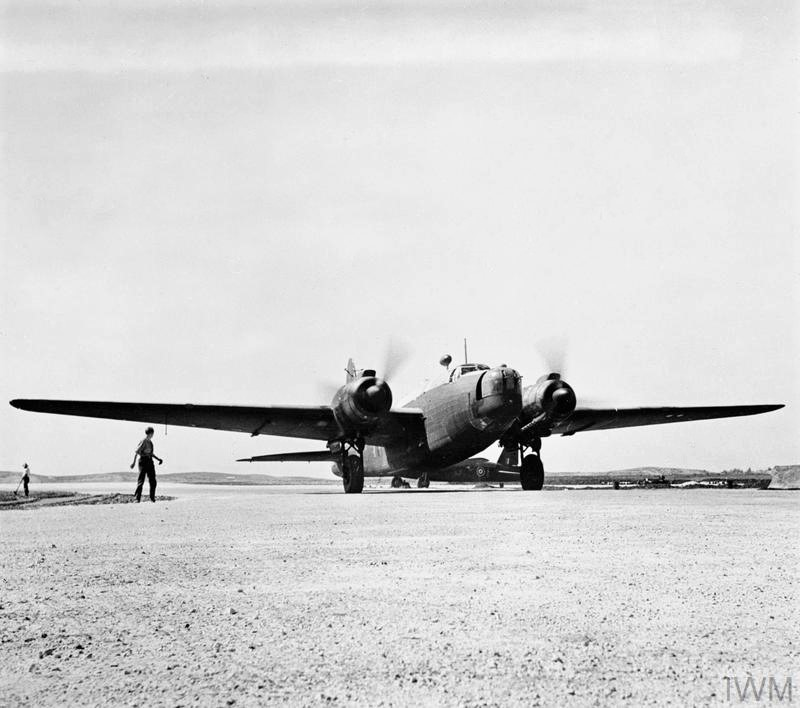
A Vickers Wellington of No. 76 Operational Training Unit taxies out for a training flight at Aqir, Palestine. ©IWM CM 5756

No. 76 Operational Training Unit RAF (76 OTU) was a Royal Air Force operational training unit during the Second World War.

The unit was formed at RAF Aqir on 1 October 1943. Throughout its existence it was equipped with Vickers Wellington bombers - Mk. III and Mk. Xs. By October 1944 all the aircraft were Mk. Xs) and trained crews for night bombing operations with RAF squadrons in the Middle East.

The unit was disbanded on 30 July 1945.

The bomber pilot Cyril Spurdens flew with the unit.
