= No. 92 Group RAF =

Former Royal Air Force operations group

No. 92 Group RAF No. 92 (Operational Training) Group No. 92 (Bomber OTU) Group
- Active: 11 May 1942 - 15 July 1945
- Country: United Kingdom
- Branch: Royal Air Force
- Type: Royal Air Force group
- Role: Controlled Bomber OTU's
- Part of: RAF Bomber Command
- Last base: Winslow Hall, Winslow, Buckinghamshire

No. 92 Group RAF is a former Royal Air Force group.

The group was formed on 11 May 1942 at Winslow Hall, Winslow, Buckinghamshire within RAF Bomber Command as No. 92 (Operational Training) Group RAF, it was previously No. 7 Group RAF. It was disbanded on 15 July 1945.

== Structure ==
- February 1943 at Winslow
  - No. 11 Operational Training Unit RAF at RAF Westcott with the Vickers Wellington I
  - No. 11 Operational Training Unit RAF at RAF Oakley with the Vickers Wellington I
  - No. 12 Operational Training Unit RAF at RAF Chipping Warden with the Vickers Wellington I
  - No. 12 Operational Training Unit RAF at RAF Turweston with the Vickers Wellington I
  - No. 13 Operational Training Unit RAF at RAF Bicester with the Bristol Blenheim I, IV
  - No. 13 Operational Training Unit RAF at RAF Finmere with the Bristol Blenheim I, IV
  - No. 14 Operational Training Unit RAF at RAF Cottesmore with the Vickers Wellington I
  - No. 14 Operational Training Unit RAF at RAF Saltby with the Vickers Wellington I
  - No. 16 Operational Training Unit RAF at RAF Upper Heyford with the Vickers Wellington I, III
  - No. 16 Operational Training Unit RAF at RAF Hinton-in-the-Hedges with the Vickers Wellington I, III
  - No. 17 Operational Training Unit RAF at RAF Upwood with the Bristol Blenheim I, IV
  - No. 26 Operational Training Unit RAF at RAF Wing with the Vickers Wellington I, III
  - No. 26 Operational Training Unit RAF at RAF Little Horwood with the Vickers Wellington I, III
  - No. 29 Operational Training Unit RAF at RAF North Luffenham with the Vickers Wellington I, III
  - No. 81 Operational Training Unit RAF at RAF Tilstock with the Armstrong Whitworth Whitley V
- February 1944 at Winslow
  - No. 11 Operational Training Unit RAF at RAF Westcott with the Vickers Wellington III, X
  - No. 11 Operational Training Unit RAF at RAF Oakley with the Vickers Wellington III, X
  - No. 12 Operational Training Unit RAF at RAF Chipping Warden with the Vickers Wellington III, X
  - No. 12 Operational Training Unit RAF at RAF Edgehill with the Vickers Wellington III, X
  - No. 14 Operational Training Unit RAF at RAF Market Harborough with the Vickers Wellington III, X
  - No. 14 Operational Training Unit RAF at RAF Husbands Bosworth with the Vickers Wellington III, X
  - No. 16 Operational Training Unit RAF at RAF Upper Heyford with the Vickers Wellington III, X
  - No. 16 Operational Training Unit RAF at RAF Barford St John with the Vickers Wellington III, X
  - No. 17 Operational Training Unit RAF at RAF Silverstone with the Vickers Wellington III, X
  - No. 17 Operational Training Unit RAF at RAF Turweston with the Vickers Wellington III, X
  - No. 26 Operational Training Unit RAF at RAF Wing with the Vickers Wellington III, X
  - No. 26 Operational Training Unit RAF at RAF Little Horwood with the Vickers Wellington III, X
  - No. 28 Operational Training Unit RAF at RAF Wymeswold with the Vickers Wellington III, X
  - No. 28 Operational Training Unit RAF at RAF Castle Donington with the Vickers Wellington III, X
  - No. 29 Operational Training Unit RAF at RAF Bruntingthorpe with the Vickers Wellington III, X
  - No. 29 Operational Training Unit RAF at RAF Bitteswell with the Vickers Wellington III, X
  - No. 84 Operational Training Unit RAF at RAF Desborough with the Vickers Wellington III, X
- February 1945 at Winslow
  - No. 11 Operational Training Unit RAF at RAF Westcott with the Vickers Wellington X
  - No. 11 Operational Training Unit RAF at RAF Oakley with the Vickers Wellington X
  - No. 12 Operational Training Unit RAF at RAF Chipping Warden with the Vickers Wellington X
  - No. 12 Operational Training Unit RAF at RAF Edgehill with the Vickers Wellington X
  - No. 14 Operational Training Unit RAF at RAF Market Harborough with the Vickers Wellington X
  - No. 16 Operational Training Unit RAF at RAF Upper Heyford with the Vickers Wellington X & the de Havilland Mosquito III, IV, VI
  - No. 16 Operational Training Unit RAF at RAF Barford St John with the Vickers Wellington X & the de Havilland Mosquito III, IV, VI
  - No. 17 Operational Training Unit RAF at RAF Silverstone with the Vickers Wellington X
  - No. 17 Operational Training Unit RAF at RAF Turweston with the Vickers Wellington X
  - No. 26 Operational Training Unit RAF at RAF Wing with the Vickers Wellington III, X
  - No. 26 Operational Training Unit RAF at RAF Little Horwood with the Vickers Wellington III, X
  - No. 29 Operational Training Unit RAF at RAF Bruntingthorpe with the Vickers Wellington X
  - No. 84 Operational Training Unit RAF at RAF Desborough with the Vickers Wellington X
  - No. 85 Operational Training Unit RAF at RAF Husbands Bosworth with the Vickers Wellington X
