= RAF Bruntingthorpe =

Former Royal Air Force station in Leicestershire, England

RAF Bruntingthorpe
- Near Bruntingthorpe, Leicestershire in England
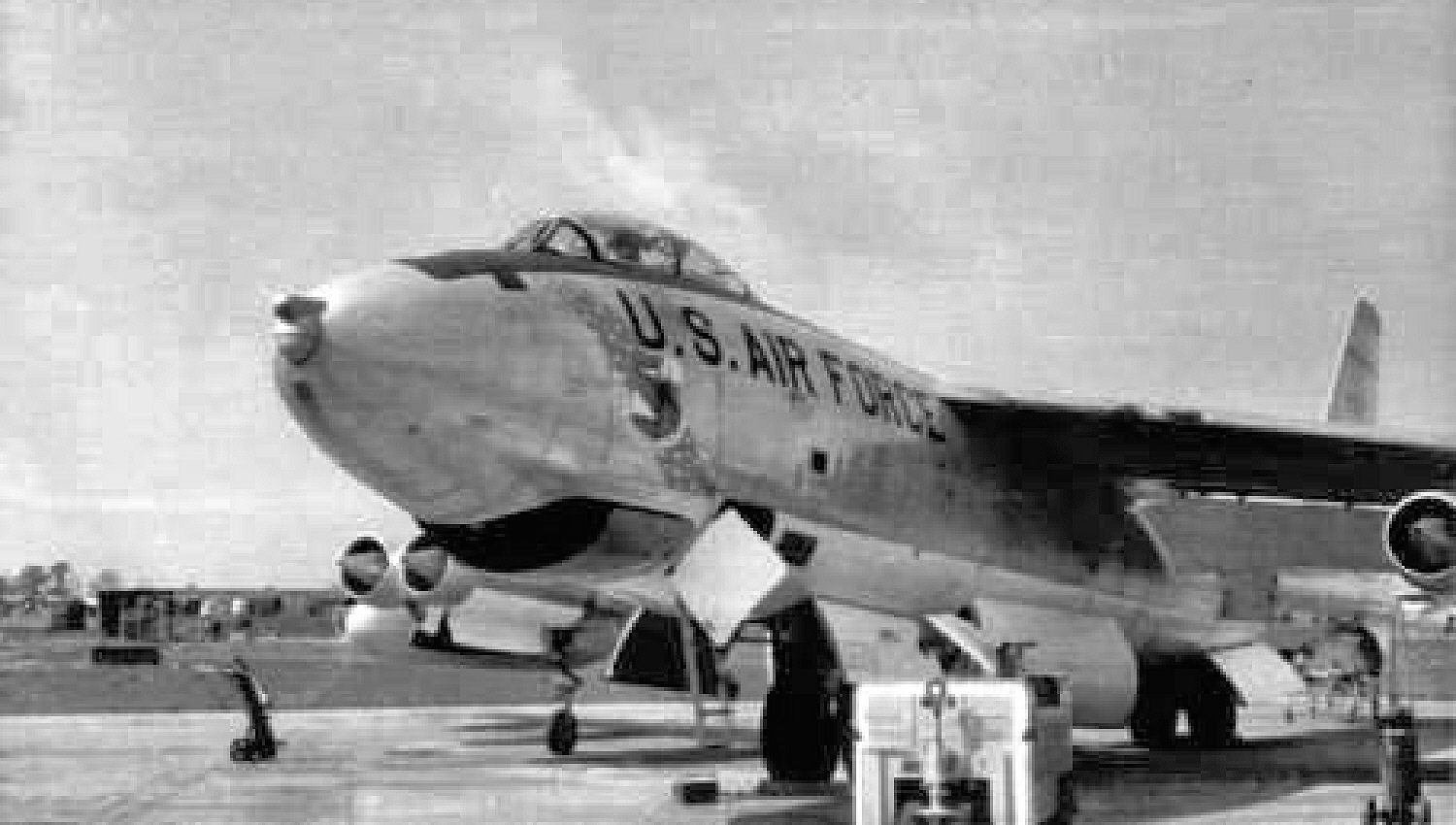
- B-47 Stratojet of the 100th Bombardment Wing parked at RAF Bruntingthorpe, 1958

Site information
- Type: Royal Air Force station
- Code: BP
- Owner: Ministry of Defence
- Operator: Royal Air Force; United States Air Force
- Controlled by: RAF Bomber Command * No. 92 (OTU) Group RAF

Location
- Shown within Leicestershire RAF Bruntingthorpe (the United Kingdom)
- Coordinates: 52°29′49″N 001°06′48″W
- Grid reference: SP599665

Site history
- Built: 1941/42
- In use: November 1942 - 1962
- Battles/wars: European theatre of World War II

Airfield information
- Elevation: 450 feet (137 m) AMSL
Runways
Direction	Length and surface
00/00	Concrete
00/00	Concrete
00/00	Concrete

Royal Air Force Bruntingthorpe or more simply RAF Bruntingthorpe is a former Royal Air Force station located 4 miles (6.4 km) north east of Lutterworth, Leicestershire and 10 miles (16 km) south of Leicester, Leicestershire, England.

It was operational between 1942 and 1962 and it is currently known as Bruntingthorpe Aerodrome.

== History ==
=== Royal Air Force use ===
The station was opened in November 1942 as the home of No. 29 Operational Training Unit RAF operating the Vickers Wellington.

After the Second World War ended, the airfield was used to test Gloster Meteor jet fighters by the Power Jets Unit. It was placed into RAF care and maintenance status and remained unused until January 1957.

The following units were also here at some point:

- No. 11 Air Crew Holding Unit RAF
- No. 44 Gliding School RAF (December 1945 - May 1946 & June - December 1949)
- No. 1683 Bomber (Defence) Training Flight RAF (June 1943 - February 1944)
- Bombing Analysis School RAF (July - December 1944)

=== United States Air Force use ===
On 13 November 1953, control of Bruntingthorpe was allocated to the United States Air Force, however the airfield remained unused for most of the decade.

In 1955, a massive reconstruction plan was approved to transform the airfield and station into a Strategic Air Command (SAC) bomber base. The USAF planned to use Bruntingthorpe as an advanced Operation Reflex base for forward deployment of the new Boeing B-47 Stratojet medium range nuclear bomber. SAC wanted to disperse its nuclear bomber force and have about half of its B-47s stationed at forward bases in Western Europe and North Africa. Because the borders of the Soviet Union and Warsaw Pact controlled areas were within the range of the B-47, the Reflex deployments would base the bombers for 90-day rotations of crews and aircraft.

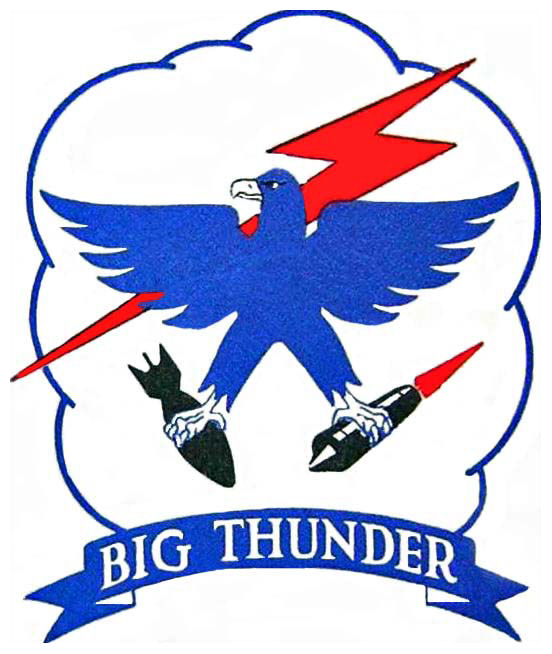
Emblem of the 3912th Air Base Squadron

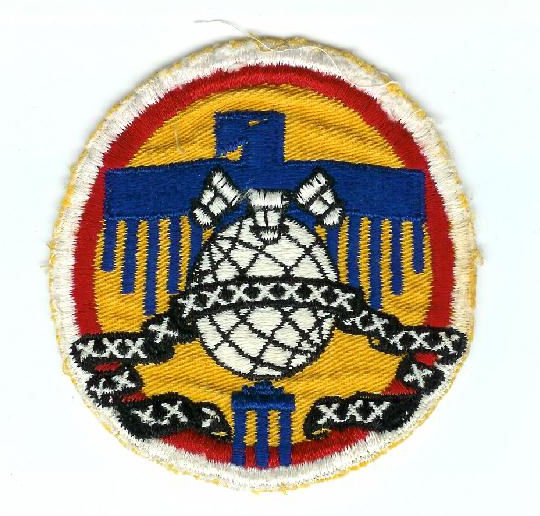
Emblem of the 19th Tactical Reconnaissance Squadron

The wartime airfield's northeast/southwest runway was widened to 200 feet and increased in length from 6,000 to 10,800 feet in addition to a new parallel taxiway. To accommodate this, thirty-four farmlands were acquired to expand the size of the runway. In addition, a large dispersal area for aircraft parking, an underground refueling pipeline network and also the removal of the wartime crosswind runways. The station area required a large number of administrative and service buildings, a new main hangar, a new control tower and other airfield support buildings. Personnel barracks and other buildings, such as officer housing and, recreation facilities.

On 1 March 1957, RAF Bruntingthorpe was activated by Strategic Air Command. The base was placed under the command of the 3912th Air Base Squadron, 7th Air Division. The first operational use of the base began in March 1958 when 43 B-47s of the 100th Bombardment Wing deployed from Pease AFB, New Hampshire arrived over a three-day period. The squadron participated in operational training missions until returning to the United States in November. The 96th Bombardment Wing from Dyess AFB, Texas, deployed its B-47s during the summer of 1959.

Following French President General de Gaulle's requirement for all foreign nuclear forces to leave France, there was a major readjustment of USAF deployments in Western Europe, and the B-47 deployments ended. On 1 September 1959, jurisdiction of Bruntingthorpe was transferred from SAC to the United States Air Forces in Europe (USAFE) and control of the facility was assigned to the 10th Tactical Reconnaissance Wing at RAF Alconbury, which had been moved from West Germany to England. The 10th TRW could not accommodate all four squadrons of the wing at Alconbury, so one was based at Bruntingthorpe, which became its satellite. The mission was changed to support Douglas RB-66B Destroyer Reconnaissance aircraft of the 19th Tactical Reconnaissance Squadron. The first B-66s arrived at the base on 26 August and by mid-September 18 were present. The squadron's activities consisted of taking high-resolution aerial photographs of Soviet and Warsaw Pact military forces and activities.

The 19th TRS remained at Bruntingthorpe for almost three years until the summer of 1962. At that time, it was decided to forward deploy the squadron to the then-unused Toul-Rosières Air Base, France. The first aircraft departed for France on 22 July, with the final aircraft departing by the end of August. With the departure of the B-66s, the USAF turned over control of Bruntingthorpe to the British Ministry of Defence on 28 September, and this ended military use of the facility.

== Current use ==
With the departure of the USAF, the MoD decided to sell off parts of the facility and to demolish buildings that it judged were no longer of use, or those World War II buildings that remained but were determined to be in a poor condition. Nearly all of the barracks, recreational and social buildings were torn down, along with a World War II hangar. In addition the USAF control tower, the crash and rescue building along with some of the buildings used during Whittle's testing of the Meteor jet during the postwar era were removed. In 1965 a public auction of land formerly used for the USAF support area was conducted.

Much of the former RAF airfield remains, including the 3000m runway built in the 1950s. Many dispersal pads for jet bombers remain, the large USAF hangar is still in use, along with the aircraft parking ramp on the south side. The airfield is now known as Bruntingthorpe Aerodrome, and was, for a time the home of the only airworthy Avro Vulcan XH558, until the aircraft left at the start of the 2009 display season and is now based at Doncaster Sheffield Airport. It is also home to the several aircraft preservation groups including Classic British Jets Collection Buccaneer Aviation Group, Lightning Preservation Group who come together with other groups to present the Cold War Jets Collection Open days.

== See also ==
- RAF Alconbury
- List of former Royal Air Force stations
- Strategic Air Command in the United Kingdom
