= Valentine Baker (pilot) =

British Armed Forces pilot (1888–1942)

Valentine Henry Baker
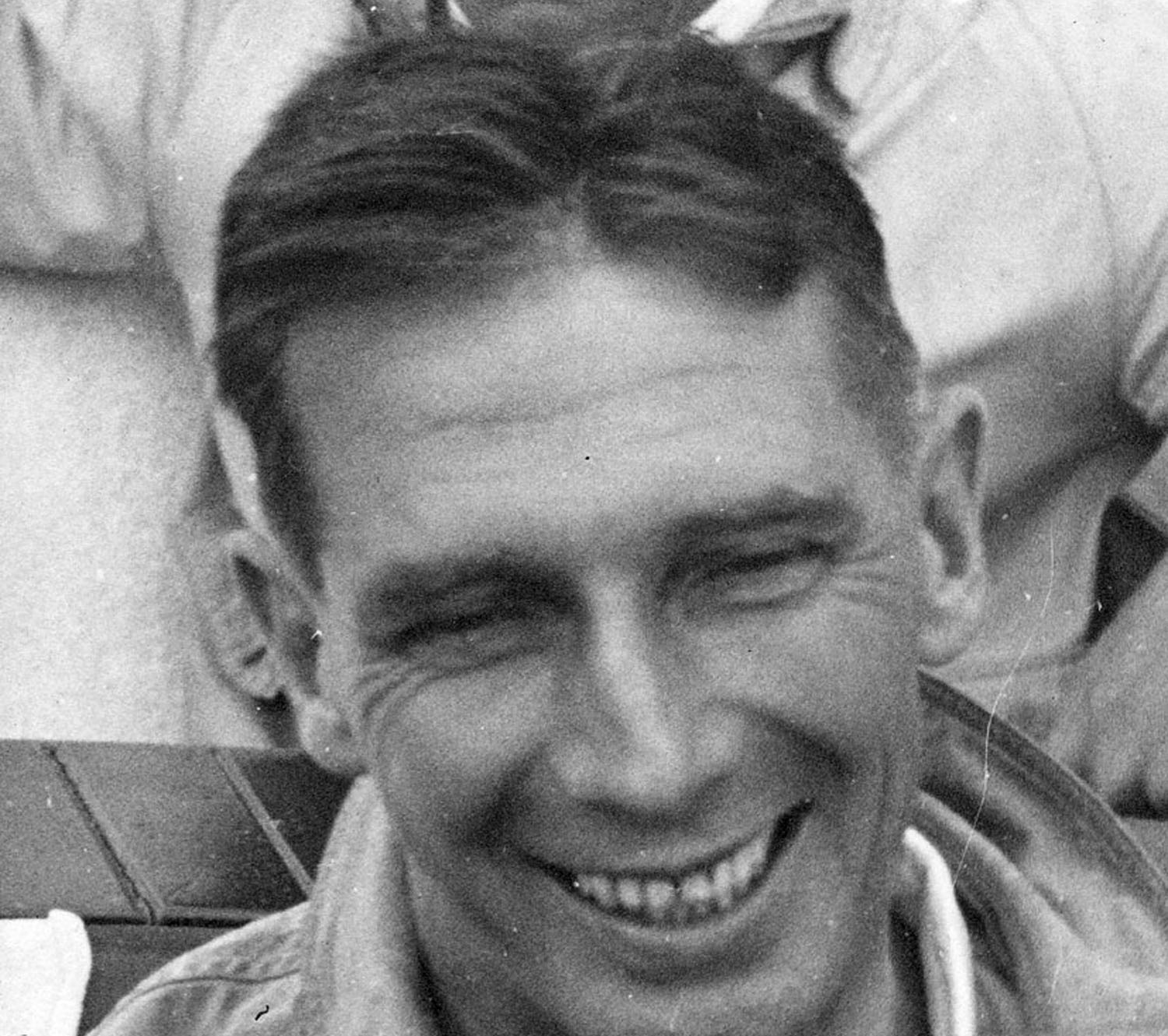
- Born: 24 August 1888; Llanfairfechan, Wales
- Died: 12 September 1942 (aged 54); RAF Wing, Buckinghamshire, England
- Relatives: Denys Val Baker (son)
- Military career
- Allegiance: United Kingdom
- Branch: Royal Navy; British Army; Royal Air Force
- Service years: 1914–1921
- Rank: Captain
- Nickname: Bake
- Units: Royal Naval Air Service Armoured Car Section; Royal Welch Fusiliers; No. 41 Squadron RFC; No. 18 Squadron RAF
- Conflicts: World War I
- Awards: Military Cross; Air Force Cross
- Other work: Flying instructor Founder of Martin-Baker Aircraft Co. Ltd.

Captain Valentine Henry Baker MC AFC (24 August 1888 – 12 September 1942), nicknamed "Bake", served in all three of the British Armed Forces during the First World War. After the war he became a civilian flight instructor, and co-founder of the Martin-Baker Aircraft Company. He was the father of novelist Denys Val Baker.

== Military career ==
Born in Llanfairfechan, Wales, Baker joined the Royal Navy ("for land service") on 27 October 1914, and was immediately rated petty officer mechanic, and assigned to the Royal Naval Air Service Armoured Car Section as a despatch rider. At the time he joined up he was described as being five feet eight and four-fifths inches tall, with a thirty-eight inch chest, "medium brown" hair, blue eyes and a "medium" complexion. Five months later, in the Gallipoli campaign, he was wounded by a bullet in his neck which lodged near his spinal column. Doctors informed him that any operation to remove it might be fatal, so Baker told them to "leave it alone then", and he lived the remainder of his life with it in his neck.

He was discharged from the RNAS on 31 August 1915, but he returned to military service with the Royal Welch Fusiliers as a temporary second lieutenant in November 1915. The following spring, after his marriage to Dilys Eames, he was posted to the School of Aero Flying and graduated as a pilot in September 1916; he was appointed a flying officer in the Military Wing of the Royal Flying Corps and transferred to the General List on 25 September.

Baker was assigned to 41 Squadron, with which he spent his entire nine-month combat flying career, during which time he was reputed to have shot down several German aircraft. He also earned the Military Cross, awarded on 26 July 1917, the citation read:

2nd Lt. Valentine Henry Baker, Gen. List and R.F.C. For conspicuous gallantry and devotion to duty. In a large number of aerial combats, he showed the greatest daring and determination. On one occasion, alone, he flew at a low altitude over the enemy lines, attacking and dispersing enemy artillery, infantry, and transport, and returned with a valuable reconnaissance report concerning the retiring enemy.

The RFC decided that his skills as a flying ace would be best used to train new pilots, and in June 1917 he became a flight instructor, teaching at Turnberry, Catterick, and Cramlington. During this period, his son was born, and he was successively promoted to temporary lieutenant, and captain on 27 August 1917.

Baker transferred to the new Royal Air Force on its formation as a merger of the RFC and RNAS on 1 April 1918. He was awarded the Air Force Cross in the 1918 King's Birthday Honours; the announcement was made the same day that the medal was instituted. Because Baker was first in the alphabetically ordered list of recipients, he is sometimes stated to be the first recipient of the medal. He was assigned to No. 18 Squadron, then sent to Beverley in September 1919 to supervise the closing of the aerodrome there, followed by an assignment to Grantham aerodrome. On 24 October 1919 he was given a regular short service commission in the rank of flight lieutenant. His final job for the military was in the Secret Codes Department, Air Ministry, from May 1920 until he resigned his commission on 1 October 1921, and was permitted to retain the rank of captain.

== Civilian life ==
Baker's first civilian job was for Vickers Limited, which took him to the Dutch East Indies. There, he became affiliated with the Netherlands Naval Aviation Service and worked for them as an instructor for three years. However, his wife became ill and they returned to England. Soon after, he took another job for Vickers, this time to Chile where he demonstrated the company's aircraft as well as trained Chilean pilots.

Upon his return to England, he noticed that there was a great deal of interest in civilians learning to fly, and he successively taught at the Lancashire Flying Club, London Aeroplane Club, and finally at Heston Aerodrome. At Heston, Baker founded the air school and it became the most famous flight school in the United Kingdom. During his career as an instructor in England, Baker personally taught many notable pupils, including Edward, Prince of Wales, Lord Londonderry of the Air Ministry, Lord Lloyd, Amy Johnson, Prince George, Duke of Kent, and Grace Marguerite Hay Drummond-Hay.

== Martin-Baker ==
In 1934, Baker left Heston to join his friend James Martin to found the Martin-Baker Aircraft Company, where Baker was the company's test pilot. During a test flight of the Martin-Baker MB 3 prototype from RAF Wing in Buckinghamshire during the late afternoon of 12 September 1942, the engine seized and he was forced into an emergency landing, during which the aircraft struck a hay rick, cartwheeled through a hedge and he was killed. The crash site was located in December 2020 and now sits on the land of the Aylesbury Vale Golf Club near to Stewkley, Buckinghamshire, where a memorial has been created along with a commissioned bust of Valentine and relics from the crash site. The main function room has been named ‘The Captain Valentine Baker Suite’. A further memorial to Valentine sits by the main runway of RAF Wing, and next to the hangar site where the MB3 was stored during the trials. Baker's death affected his partner deeply, so much so that pilot safety became Martin's primary focus and led to the reorganisation of the company to focus on ejection seats.
