= Listed buildings in Frant =

Historic structures in East Sussex, England

Frant is a village and civil parish in the Wealden District, East Sussex, England. It contains one grade I, two grade II* and 80 grade II listed buildings that are recorded in the National Heritage List for England.

This list is based on the information retrieved online from Historic England..

== Key ==
Grade	Criteria
I	Buildings that are of exceptional interest
II*	Particularly important buildings of more than special interest
II	Buildings that are of special interest

== Listing ==
Name	Grade	Location	Type	Completed (Note: The date given is the date used by Historic England as significant for the initial building or that of an important part in the structure's description.)	Date designated	Grid ref. (Note: The grid reference is based on the British national grid reference system, sometimes known as OSGB36, used by the Ordnance Survey.) Geo-coordinates	Notes	Entry number (Note: The "List Entry Number" is a unique number assigned to each listed building and scheduled monument by Historic England.)	Image	Wikidata
The Dower House	II*	Bayham Abbey, Bayham Road			18 March 1977	TQ6492936461; 51°06′13″N 0°21′16″E		1028367	Upload Photo	Q17556257
The Ruins of Bayham Abbey	I	Bayham Road			26 November 1953	TQ6501936498; 51°06′15″N 0°21′20″E		1192095	Upload Photo	Q4874529
Yew Trees	II	Bell Yews Green			31 December 1982	TQ6097236196; 51°06′09″N 0°17′52″E		1028368	Upload Photo	Q26279450
Rushlye Farm Barn	II	Bells Yew Green			10 January 1984	TQ6128236624; 51°06′22″N 0°18′09″E		1252462	Upload Photo	Q26544327
Barn about 40 Metres East South East of Manor Farmhouse	II	Bells Yew Green			19 August 1988	TQ6025635311; 51°05′41″N 0°17′14″E		1353719	Upload Photo	Q26636628
Lowfield	II	Bells Yew Green			31 December 1982	TQ6096536122; 51°06′07″N 0°17′52″E		1192139	Upload Photo	Q26486821
The South West Gateway of Bayham Abbey	II	Bells Yew Green			31 December 1982	TQ6134436738; 51°06′26″N 0°18′12″E		1353527	Upload Photo	Q26636446
Frant Station	II	Bells Yew Green			31 December 1982	TQ6073836366; 51°06′15″N 0°17′40″E		1192129	Upload Photo	Q1913083
Rushlye Farmhouse	II	Bells Yew Green			31 December 1982	TQ6131436599; 51°06′22″N 0°18′10″E		1028369	Upload Photo	Q26279451
Stables about 30 Metres East of Manor Farmhouse	II	Bells Yew Green			19 August 1988	TQ6024535312; 51°05′41″N 0°17′13″E		1027951	Upload Photo	Q26278919
Higham Farmhouse	II	Bells Yew Green			26 November 1953	TQ6179835675; 51°05′51″N 0°18′34″E		1353526	Upload Photo	Q26636445
Sunninglye Farmhouse	II	Benhall Mill Road			26 November 1953	TQ6223137834; 51°07′01″N 0°18′59″E		1192154	Upload Photo	Q26486837
Sunninglye Barn	II	Benhall Mill Road			15 March 1988	TQ6223237900; 51°07′03″N 0°19′00″E		1252525	Upload Photo	Q26544379
Broadwater Lodge	II	Broadwater			31 December 1982	TQ5632236900; 51°06′36″N 0°13′54″E		1028370	Upload Photo	Q26279453
Oasthouses and Granary to the North of Rowden Farmhouse	II	Down Lane			31 December 1982	TQ5905333986; 51°04′59″N 0°16′10″E		1353546	Upload Photo	Q26636465
Dundale Bridge	II	Dundale Road			7 August 2000	TQ6288938476; 51°07′21″N 0°19′34″E		1245926	Upload Photo	Q26538392
Staircase Villa	II	Eridge Green			31 December 1982	TQ5574135602; 51°05′55″N 0°13′22″E		1353548	Upload Photo	Q26636467
Thatched Cottage	II	Eridge Green			31 December 1982	TQ5567135534; 51°05′53″N 0°13′19″E		1028331	Upload Photo	Q26279403
The Cottage	II	Eridge Green			31 December 1982	TQ5550235402; 51°05′49″N 0°13′10″E		1028333	Upload Photo	Q26279406
Holy Trinity Church	II	Eridge Green			31 December 1982	TQ5576335644; 51°05′56″N 0°13′24″E		1028329	Upload Photo	Q26279400
The Nevill Crest and Gun Hotel	II	Eridge Green			31 December 1982	TQ5581935753; 51°06′00″N 0°13′27″E		1028328	Upload Photo	Q26279399
Windmill Lodge, With The Gateway Adjoining In The Grounds Of Eridge Castle,	II	Eridge Green			31 December 1982	TQ5645236338; 51°06′18″N 0°14′00″E		1028334	Upload Photo	Q26279407
1 and 2 Yew Tree Cottages, Frant	II	1 and 2 Yew Tree Cottages, Eridge Green			31 December 1982	TQ5559835478; 51°05′51″N 0°13′15″E		1028332	Upload Photo	Q26279405
Cricket Pavilion on South Side of Cricket Ground at Tq 5615 3585	II	Eridge Park, Eridge			14 September 1992	TQ5615535832; 51°06′02″N 0°13′44″E		1027971	Upload Photo	Q26278940
Beehive Cottage, Ebenezer Cottage And Wisteria Cottage	II	Eridge Road, Eridge Greet			31 December 1982	TQ5571735575; 51°05′54″N 0°13′21″E		1028330	Upload Photo	Q26279402
Frant Bottom Lodge in the Grounds of Eridge Castle	II	Eridge Road			31 December 1982	TQ5843036539; 51°06′23″N 0°15′42″E		1192215	Upload Photo	Q26486894
The Coach House, Nevill Crest And Gun,	II	Eridge Road, TN3 9JR, Eridge Green			31 December 1982	TQ5583535772; 51°06′00″N 0°13′27″E		1353547	Upload Photo	Q26636466
Old Marlying	II	Eridge Road (A267)			26 November 1953	TQ5884834208; 51°05′07″N 0°16′00″E		1192246	Upload Photo	Q26486921
Chase Farmhouse	II	Frant Road, TN3 9HG			31 December 1982	TQ5846736339; 51°06′16″N 0°15′44″E		1286689	Upload Photo	Q26575261
Chasewood Cottage	II	Frant Road			31 December 1982	TQ5853036070; 51°06′07″N 0°15′46″E		1028336	Upload Photo	Q26279409
Whitehill Lodge, With The Gateway Adjoining In Grounds Of Eridge Castle	II	Frant Road			31 December 1982	TQ5872635678; 51°05′54″N 0°15′56″E		1028335	Upload Photo	Q26279408
1 and 2, Yew Tree Cottage	II	Frant Road, TN3 9HB			31 December 1982	TQ5830136992; 51°06′37″N 0°15′36″E		1028337	Upload Photo	Q26279410
Entrance Building to High Rocks	II	High Rocks, TN3 9JJ			31 December 1982	TQ5585838270; 51°07′21″N 0°13′33″E		1192324	Upload Photo	Q26486997
High Rocks Inn	II	High Rocks			31 December 1982	TQ5583438297; 51°07′22″N 0°13′31″E		1028345	Upload Photo	Q26279422
The Iron Railing at Manor Cottage to the East of the House	II	High Street			31 December 1982	TQ5904135489; 51°05′48″N 0°16′12″E		1028347	Upload Photo	Q26279424
The Old School and the Saddlery	II	High Street, TN3 9DT			31 December 1982	TQ5900535584; 51°05′51″N 0°16′10″E		1028348	Upload Photo	Q26279425
Manor Cottage	II	High Street			31 December 1982	TQ5902935504; 51°05′48″N 0°16′11″E		1192330	Upload Photo	Q26487003
The Parish Church of St Alban	II	High Street			26 November 1953	TQ5903135656; 51°05′53″N 0°16′11″E		1353515	Upload Photo	Q26636435
The George Public House	II	High Street			31 December 1982	TQ5904035603; 51°05′52″N 0°16′12″E		1353537	Upload Photo	Q26636456
Greenwood Lodge	II	High Street, The Green			18 April 1973	TQ5902635463; 51°05′47″N 0°16′11″E		1028346	Upload Photo	Q26279423
The Gates and Gatepiers to Ely Grange	II	High Street			31 December 1982	TQ5905235629; 51°05′52″N 0°16′13″E		1028310	Upload Photo	Q26279377
Little Wyndhams	II	3, High Street			31 December 1982	TQ5903135525; 51°05′49″N 0°16′11″E		1192334	Upload Photo	Q26487007
Virginia Cottage	II	4, High Street			31 December 1982	TQ5905535521; 51°05′49″N 0°16′13″E		1028306	Upload Photo	Q26279372
5 and 7, High Street	II	5 and 7, High Street			31 December 1982	TQ5902735542; 51°05′50″N 0°16′11″E		1353516	Upload Photo	Q26636436
Lilac Cottage	II	12, High Street			31 December 1982	TQ5905535537; 51°05′50″N 0°16′13″E		1353536	Upload Photo	Q26636455
Stone House	II	14, High Street			31 December 1982	TQ5906035546; 51°05′50″N 0°16′13″E		1028307	Upload Photo	Q26279374
16-32, High Street	II	16-32, High Street			31 December 1982	TQ5905535564; 51°05′50″N 0°16′13″E		1028308	Upload Photo	Q26279375
19, High Street	II	19, High Street			31 December 1982	TQ5901835560; 51°05′50″N 0°16′11″E		1192340	Upload Photo	Q26487013
Rymans Cottages	II	25 27 29 and 31, High Street			31 December 1982	TQ5901235596; 51°05′51″N 0°16′10″E		1192347	Upload Photo	Q26487019
33, 35 and 37, High Street	II	33, 35 and 37, High Street, TN3 9DT			31 December 1982	TQ5900635613; 51°05′52″N 0°16′10″E		1353535	Upload Photo	Q26636454
Priory Cottages	II	38 40 42 and 44, High Street			31 December 1982	TQ5904235617; 51°05′52″N 0°16′12″E		1028309	Upload Photo	Q26279376
Myrtle Cottage	II	Mayfield Road			31 December 1982	TQ5883434205; 51°05′07″N 0°15′59″E		1353549	Upload Photo	Q26636468
Barn Adjoining Pococks Gate to the West	II	Mayfield Road			31 December 1982	TQ5844633440; 51°04′42″N 0°15′38″E		1353510	Upload Photo	Q26636430
Pococks Gate	II	Mayfield Road			31 December 1982	TQ5846433442; 51°04′42″N 0°15′39″E		1192270	Upload Photo	Q26486944
Rowden House Farmhouse	II	Mayfield Road			31 December 1982	TQ5866933786; 51°04′53″N 0°15′50″E		1028338	Upload Photo	Q26279411
Deer Park Cottage	II	Mayfield Road			31 December 1982	TQ5867333968; 51°04′59″N 0°15′50″E		1192265	Upload Photo	Q26486939
The White House	II	The Green			31 December 1982	TQ5888735410; 51°05′46″N 0°16′04″E		1353514	Upload Photo	Q26636434
Park Hill	II	The Green			26 November 1953	TQ5891035127; 51°05′36″N 0°16′04″E		1286650	Upload Photo	Q26575229
The Albert Memorial Well	II	The Green			31 December 1982	TQ5880435570; 51°05′51″N 0°16′00″E		1286653	Upload Photo	Q26575232
The Victoria Well	II	The Green			31 December 1982	TQ5905335475; 51°05′47″N 0°16′12″E		1286674	Upload Photo	Q26575249
The Limes	II	The Green			31 December 1982	TQ5895535460; 51°05′47″N 0°16′07″E		1353511	Upload Photo	Q26636431
East Lodge	II	The Green			31 December 1982	TQ5903835220; 51°05′39″N 0°16′11″E		1353512	Upload Photo	Q26636432
Garden Railing to West of Stone Cottage	II	The Green			31 December 1982	TQ5902135211; 51°05′39″N 0°16′10″E		1028342	Upload Photo	Q26279418
Stone House	II	The Green			31 December 1982	TQ5903035193; 51°05′38″N 0°16′11″E		1028343	Upload Photo	Q26279419
Frant Post Office	II	The Green			31 December 1982	TQ5891135428; 51°05′46″N 0°16′05″E		1192282	Upload Photo	Q26486956
Stone Cottage	II	The Green			31 December 1982	TQ5902835205; 51°05′39″N 0°16′11″E		1192301	Upload Photo	Q26486975
One Ash	II	The Green			31 December 1982	TQ5890835368; 51°05′44″N 0°16′05″E		1192318	Upload Photo	Q26486991
The Abergavenny Arms Hotel	II	The Green			31 December 1982	TQ5887235482; 51°05′48″N 0°16′03″E		1028339	Upload Photo	Q26279413
Shernfold Lodge	II	The Green			31 December 1982	TQ5895335123; 51°05′36″N 0°16′07″E		1192306	Upload Photo	Q26486980
Eridge Cottage	II	The Green			31 December 1982	TQ5888435457; 51°05′47″N 0°16′04″E		1192278	Upload Photo	Q26486952
Gable Cottage	II	The Green			31 December 1982	TQ5913735446; 51°05′46″N 0°16′17″E		1192296	Upload Photo	Q26486971
Two Sets of Gatepiers and Linking Wall at Entrance to Shernfold Park	II	The Green			31 December 1982	TQ5895835131; 51°05′36″N 0°16′07″E		1353513	Upload Photo	Q26636433
Mastingate and Tollgate	II	The Green			31 December 1982	TQ5909735506; 51°05′48″N 0°16′15″E		1028341	Upload Photo	Q26279416
Post Office	II	The Green, Tunbridge Wells, TN3 9DR			13 July 2017	TQ5892035422; 51°05′46″N 0°16′05″E		1444524	Upload Photo	Q66478635
Park View	II	1-4, The Green			31 December 1982	TQ5889235435; 51°05′46″N 0°16′04″E		1028340	Upload Photo	Q26279414
Court Cottages	II	1-4, The Green			31 December 1982	TQ5892435187; 51°05′38″N 0°16′05″E		1028344	Upload Photo	Q26279421
Barelands Farmhouse	II				26 November 1953	TQ6088135224; 51°05′38″N 0°17′46″E		1286776	Upload Photo	Q26575337
Oasthouses and Granary to the North of Barelands Farmhouse	II				31 December 1982	TQ6087835254; 51°05′39″N 0°17′46″E		1353524	Upload Photo	Q26636443
Frant Court and Attached Wall	II				24 August 1998	TQ5893435256; 51°05′41″N 0°16′06″E		1376149	Upload Photo	Q26656798
Shernfold Park	II				31 December 1982	TQ5907334905; 51°05′29″N 0°16′12″E		1028366	Upload Photo	Q26279449
Cornhill Cottages	II				31 December 1982	TQ6005535373; 51°05′43″N 0°17′04″E		1028365	Upload Photo	Q26279448
Lightlands	II*				26 November 1953	TQ5964333353; 51°04′38″N 0°16′39″E		1192089	Upload Photo	Q17556865
Spratsbrook Farmhouse	II				10 December 1987	TQ5672037080; 51°06′42″N 0°14′15″E		1027992	Upload Photo	Q26278966

== See also ==
- Grade I listed buildings in East Sussex
- Grade II* listed buildings in East Sussex

== Sources ==
- Antram, Nicholas; Pevsner, Nikolaus (2012) [1965], Sussex: East, The Buildings of England, New Haven and London: Yale University Press, ISBN 978-0-300-18473-0
