= RAF Little Horwood =

Former RAF base in Buckinghamshire, England

RAF Little Horwood
- Near Little Horwood, Buckinghamshire in England
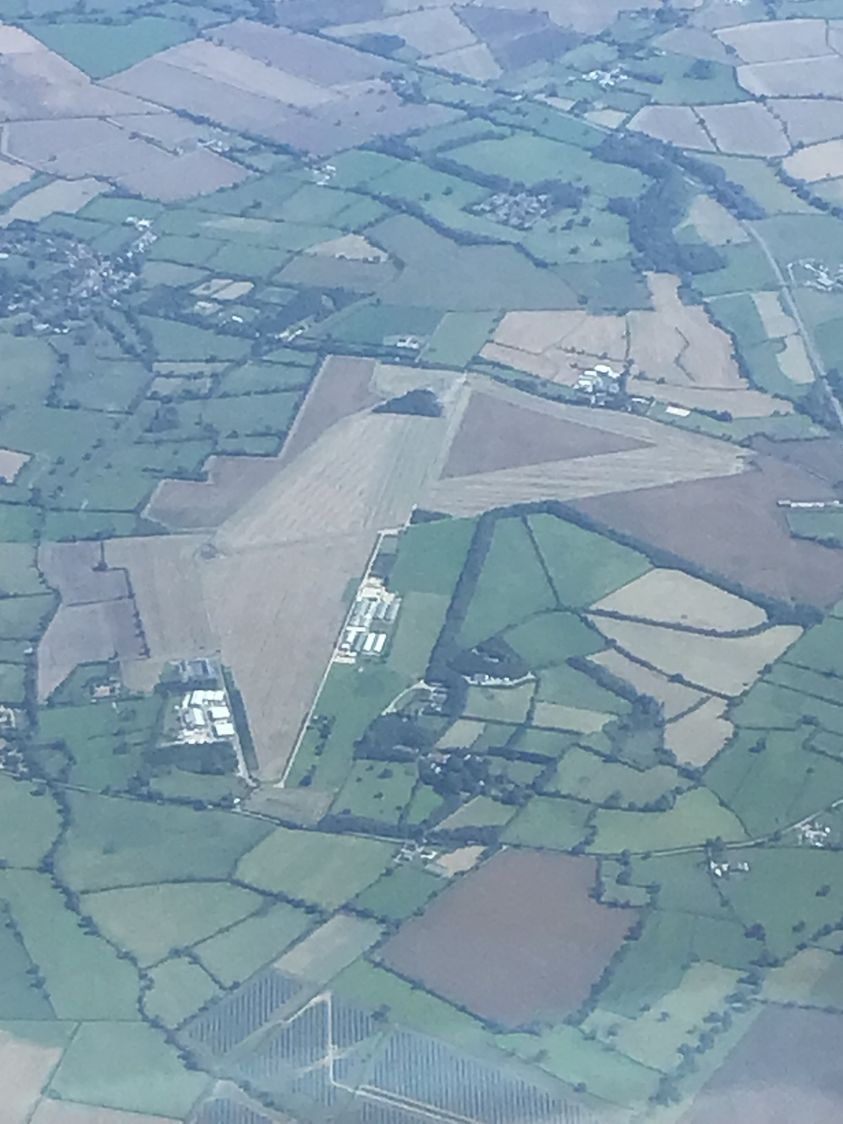
- RAF Little Horwood (September 2023)

Site information
- Type: Royal Air Force satellite station
- Code: LH
- Owner: Air Ministry
- Operator: Royal Air Force
- Controlled by: RAF Bomber Command * No. 92 (OTU) Group RAF

Location
- Shown within Buckinghamshire RAF Little Horwood (the United Kingdom)
- Coordinates: 51°57′51″N 000°52′21″W

Site history
- Built: 1942
- In use: September 1942 - November 1947
- Fate: Returned to civilian use
- Battles/wars: European theatre of World War II

Garrison information
- Garrison: No 26 OTU; No 71 MU; No 92 Gp Comms Flight; No 1684 (Bomber) Defence Training Flight

Airfield information
- Elevation: 117 metres (384 ft) AMSL
Runways
Direction	Length and surface
00/00	1,800 metres (5,906 ft) Concrete
00/00	1,260 metres (4,134 ft) Concrete
00/00	1,260 metres (4,134 ft) Concrete

Royal Air Force Little Horwood or more simply RAF Little Horwood is a former Royal Air Force satellite station. It was established during the Second World War, and is located on the site of Greenway Farm in Aylesbury Vale, north east Buckinghamshire. The airfield sits within a triangle formed by Little Horwood, Great Horwood, and Winslow. It was in operation from September 1942 until January 1946. It is now mostly returned to agricultural use.

== History ==
The airfield was established as a base for Operational Training Units to train recruits for combat and also for "nickelling", the dropping of propaganda leaflets. The airfield went operational on 2 September 1942 and served as a satellite for RAF Wing.

The runway was built of rubble from bomb damaged London. Vickers Wellington bombers from No. 26 OTU arrived along with OTU Gunnery section and the 92 Group Communications flight to commence the basic training of recruits.

No. 1684 OTU Bomber Defence Training Flight moved to Little Horwood on 5 June 1943 and simulation battles were undertaken using Curtiss Tomahawk aircraft. Flying ended at Little Horwood on 30 November 1945 with the remnants of No. 26 OTU remaining until January 1946.

On 7 August 1943, a Wellington Bomber X3790 from the airfield crashed into Winslow town centre killing four crew and 13 civilians.

The site has been subject to several major development proposals in recent years, but these have not been well received locally and have all been rejected.
