= RAF Toome =

RAF Toome
- Toome, County Antrim in Northern Ireland

Site information
- Type: Satellite Station
- Owner: Air Ministry
- Operator: Royal Air Force
- Controlled by: RAF Flying Training Command

Location
- Shown within Northern Ireland RAF Toome (the United Kingdom)
- Coordinates: 54°45′15″N 006°29′42″W

Site history
- Built: 1943
- In use: 2 January 1943 -1959
- Battles/wars: European theatre of World War II

Airfield information
Runways
Direction	Length and surface
00/00	Asphalt
00/00	Asphalt
00/00	Asphalt

Royal Air Force Toome or more simply RAF Toome is a former Royal Air Force satellite station located in Toome, County Antrim, Northern Ireland.

== History ==
The following units were here at some point:

- Relief Landing Ground of No. 2 Flying Training School RAF (February 1953 - ?)
- 'A' Flight of No. 104 (Transport) Operational Training Unit RAF (July - September 1943)
- No. 203 Gliding School RAF (July 1953 - April 1955)
- Mobile Transport Servicing Unit of No. 217 Maintenance Unit RAF (October 1945 - February 1946)
- No. 257 Maintenance Unit RAF (June 1945 - March 1947)
