= Ashton Roskill =

British barrister and public servant

Sir Ashton Wentworth Roskill, QC (1 January 1902 – 23 June 1991) was a British barrister and public servant.

Ashton Roskill was the eldest of the four sons of the barrister John Henry Roskill KC and his wife Sybil Mary Wentworth, née Dilke (1879–1931), daughter of Ashton Wentworth Dilke MP, who was the younger brother of the republican MP Sir Charles Dilke, 2nd Baronet. Ashton Roskill's three brothers all achieved distinction: Stephen Wentworth Roskill (1903–1982) was a distinguished naval officer and historian, Oliver Wentworth Roskill (1906–1994), was one of the United Kingdom's first industrial consultants, and Eustace Wentworth Roskill, Baron Roskill of Newtown (1911–1996), was a lord of appeal in ordinary.

Roskill was educated at Winchester College and at Exeter College, Oxford, where he was a scholar and took first-class honours in modern history. He was called to the bar by the Inner Temple in 1925, having obtained a certificate of honour in his bar examinations. After pupillage with D. N. Pritt, he joint Pritt's chambers and built a general practice. His legal career was interrupted by the Second World War, during which he worked for MI5 from 1940 to 1945. Returning to the bar after the war, he was made a King's Counsel in 1949. His practice, then mainly commercial, was said to be one of high quality, though of limited size, which was thought to have prevented his elevation to the High Court bench.

Having been a part-time member of the Monopolies Commission since 1960, he was appointed chairman of the Monopolies Commission in 1965. He was knighted in 1967, and stepped down as chairman in 1975, after a successful tenure.
