= RAF Desborough =

RAF Desborough
- Desborough, Northamptonshire in England

Site information
- Type: Royal Air Force station Parent station
- Code: DS
- Owner: Air Ministry
- Operator: Royal Air Force
- Controlled by: RAF Bomber Command * No. 92 (OTU) Group RAF

Location
- Shown within Northamptonshire RAF Desborough (the United Kingdom)
- Coordinates: 52°28′08″N 0°47′51″W

Site history
- Built: 1943
- In use: September 1943 - 1953
- Battles/wars: European theatre of World War II

Airfield information
- Elevation: 140 metres (459 ft) AMSL
Runways
Direction	Length and surface
00/00	Tarmac
00/00	Tarmac
00/00	Tarmac

Royal Air Force Desborough or more simply RAF Desborough is a former Royal Air Force station located near Desborough, Northamptonshire, England

== History ==
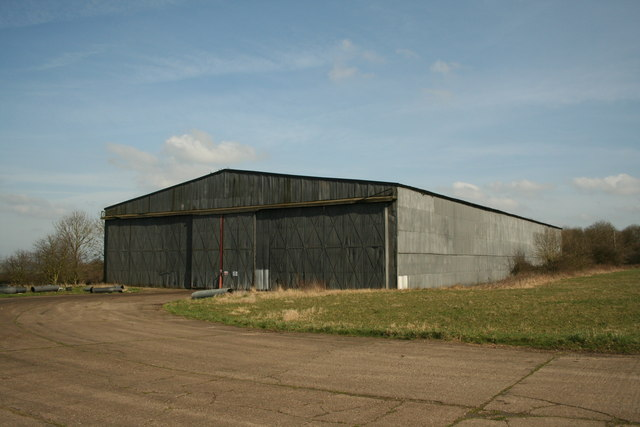
T.2 hangar during 2009

The following units were here at some point:

- No. 108 Gliding School RAF (September 1945 - June 1949)
- No. 84 Operational Training Unit RAF (September 1943 - June 1945)
- No. 1381 (Transport) Conversion Unit RAF (November 1945 - January 1947)
- Satellite of No. 102 Flying Refresher School RAF (May - November 1951)

== Current use ==
The site has reverted to farmland. An original Ministry of Aircraft Production B.1 type aircraft hangar was destroyed by fire there in the 1980s

A major fire on 20th March 2025 destroyed one of the remaining T.2 type hangars which was being used for storage.
