= RAF Husbands Bosworth =

Former RAF base in Leicestershire, England

RAF Husbands Bosworth
- Husbands Bosworth, Leicestershire in England
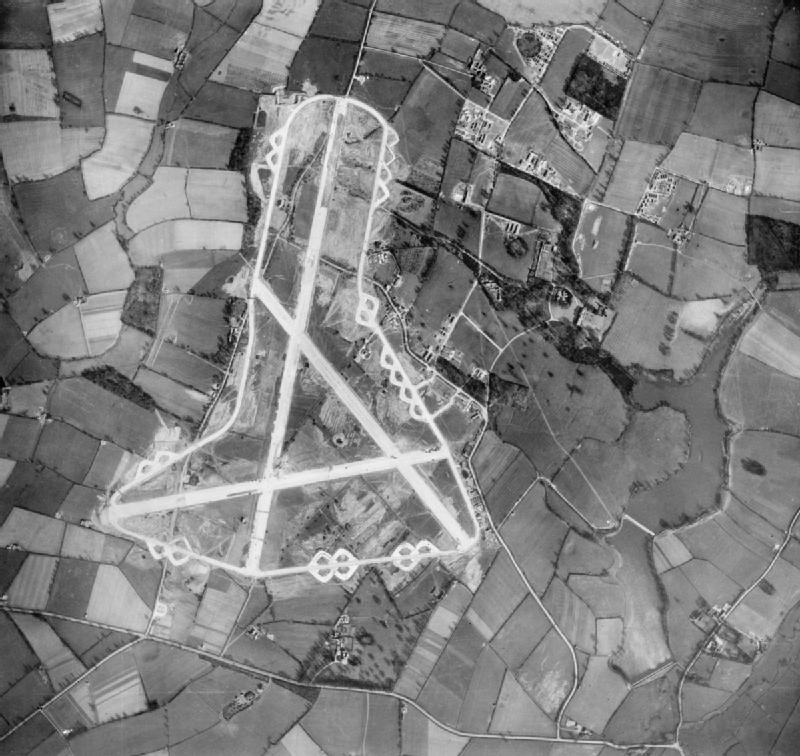
- Aerial photograph of RAF Husbands Bosworth taken during the airfield's construction.

Site information
- Type: Royal Air Force satellite station
- Code: HZ
- Owner: Air Ministry
- Operator: Royal Air Force
- Controlled by: RAF Bomber Command * No. 92 (OTU) Group RAF

Location
- Shown within Leicestershire RAF Husbands Bosworth (the United Kingdom)
- Coordinates: 52°26′11″N 001°02′34″W

Site history
- Built: 1942
- In use: 1943 - 1946
- Battles/wars: European theatre of World War II

Airfield information
- Elevation: 155 metres (509 ft) AMSL
Runways
Direction	Length and surface
04/22	1,290 metres (4,232 ft) Concrete
09/27	1,830 metres (6,004 ft) Concrete
13/31	1,290 metres (4,232 ft) Concrete

Royal Air Force Husbands Bosworth or more simply RAF Husbands Bosworth is a former Royal Air Force satellite station near the village of Husbands Bosworth in the county of Leicestershire, England.

== History ==
=== Construction & layout ===
Land in the vicinity of the village of Husbands Bosworth had been earmarked for an airbase as early as 1941, offering a well-drained and level site. Construction of the airfield was undertaken by George Wimpey & Son and commenced in August 1942 with completion scheduled for March 1943 although it was not completed until October of that year, the cost of the construction is estimated as £805,000. RAF Husbands Bosworth conformed to the layout of a typical RAF aerodrome, that is the specifications set by the British Air Ministry which called for three converging strips, each containing a concrete runway optimally placed (if practicable at the site) at 60 degree angles to each other in a triangular pattern. Gravel used to level the land was brought to the site from Kilworth Wharf on the Grand Union Canal.

Thirty six dispersal places were situated around the perimeter track in addition to which the bomb store was located on the northern edge of the airfield and four main hangars also formed part of the airfield infrastructure.

=== Operational life ===
Although the final phases of construction were still being completed, the first RAF personnel arrived at the Station on 1 August 1943, when personnel from No. 14 Operational Training Unit (No. 14 OTU) arrived from RAF Cottesmore subsequently being joined by additional personnel from RAF Saltby. Operational flying commenced on 10 August when daylight operations were undertaken with the first night operations beginning on 17 August.

RAF Husbands Bosworth came under 92 Group RAF, and was initially a satellite airfield for RAF Market Harborough under the command of the parent Station. The complement of aircraft on the Stations as of 1943 is listed as 61 Vickers Wellingtons, 4 Miles Martinets and an Avro Anson. The Wellingtons were the primary training aircraft by that time largely withdrawn from front-line operations, the Martinets would have been used for the target towing operations and the Anson would have served as the Station's communication aircraft.

On 15 June 1944 No. 85 Operational Training Unit (No. 85 OTU) was formed at RAF Husbands Bosworth. The unit was formed from an element from No. 14 OTU and was tasked with training crews to undertake night bombing operations. No. 85 OTU was disbanded on 14 June 1945.

=== Closure ===
Following the disbandment of No. 85 OTU and the cessation of hostilities in 1945 activity on the Station was reduced to a minimum, and in 1946 it was closed.

== Current use ==
Today the former Royal Air Force Station is known as Husbands Bosworth Airfield, and is home to the Husbands Bosworth Gliding Club Ltd, previously known as the Coventry Gliding Club Ltd from 1953 to 2022.

The National Police Air Service (NPAS) have a Eurocopter EC135 Police Helicopter based at Husbands Bosworth, which serves the Midlands along with East Anglia.

Following the closure of the RAF aerodrome the subsequent release of land by the British Government, the truncated Sibbertoft Road now lies on what once was the main east–west runway. and the current grass airfield is north of the road.

== Gallery ==
RAF Husbands Bosworth
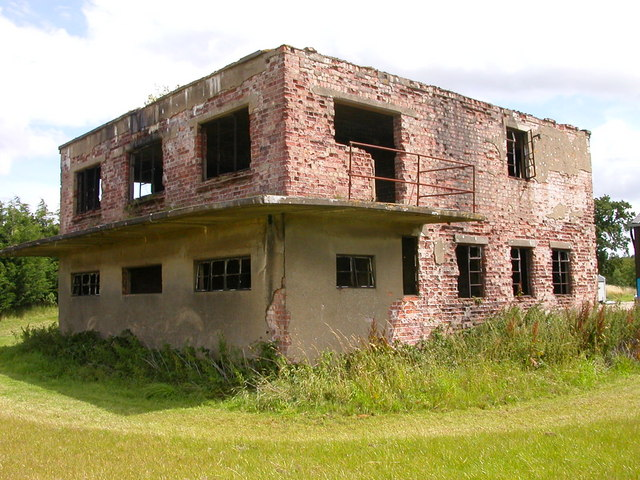
The Former Watch Tower at RAF Husbands Bosworth

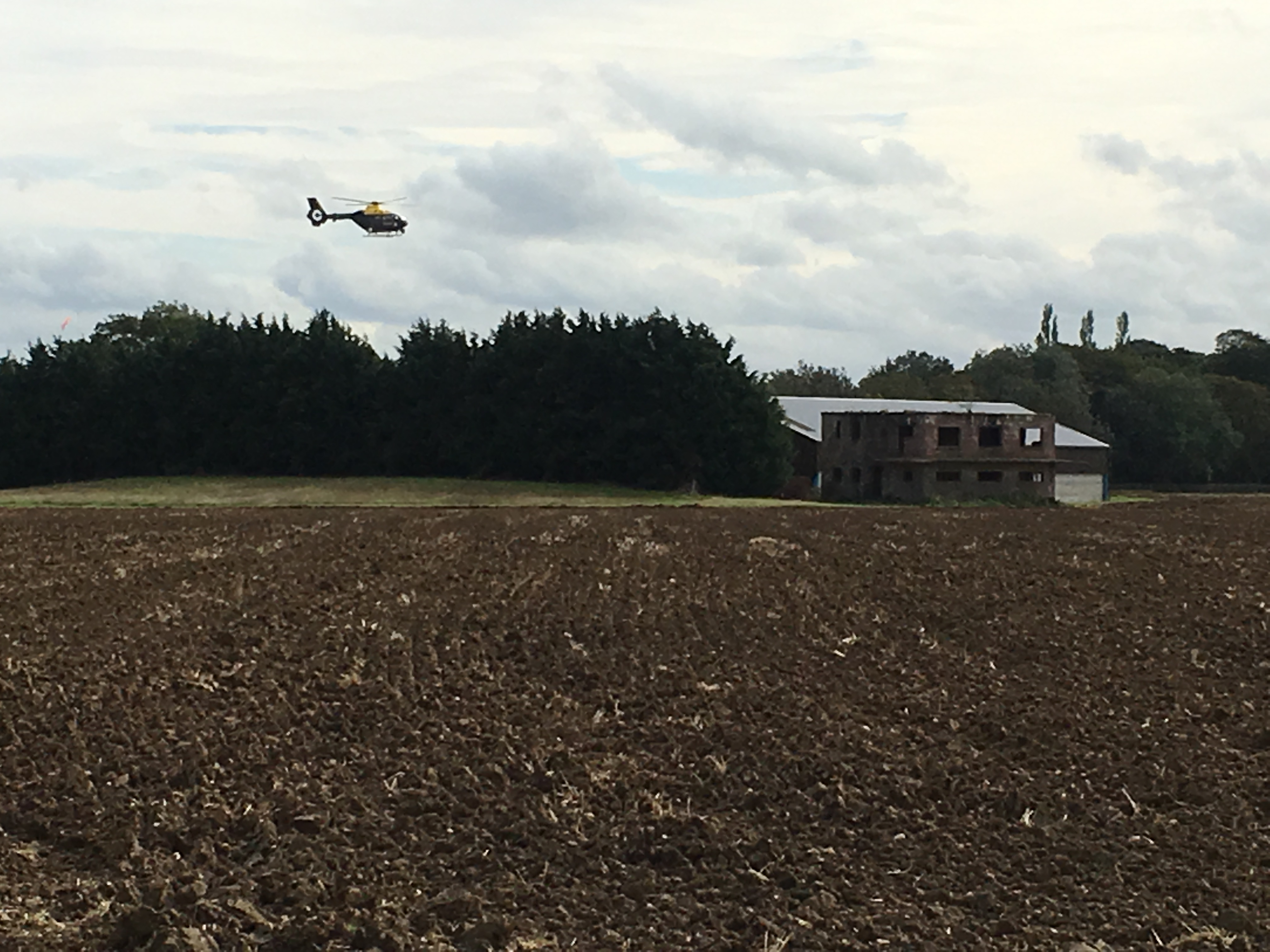
Police helicopter landing at former RAF Husbands Bosworth (2019)

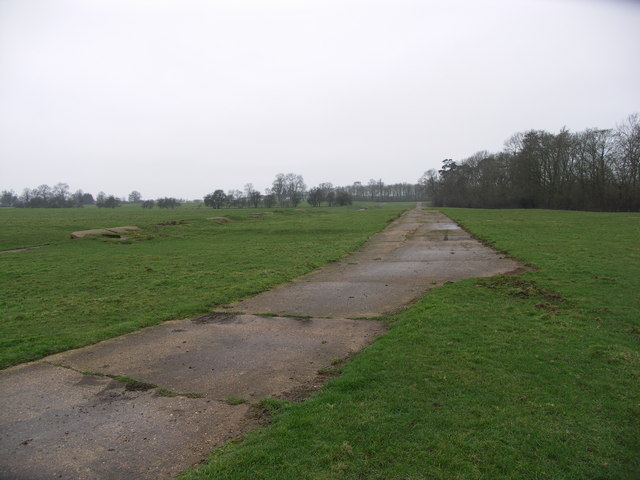
Part of the former perimeter track at RAF Husbands Bosworth

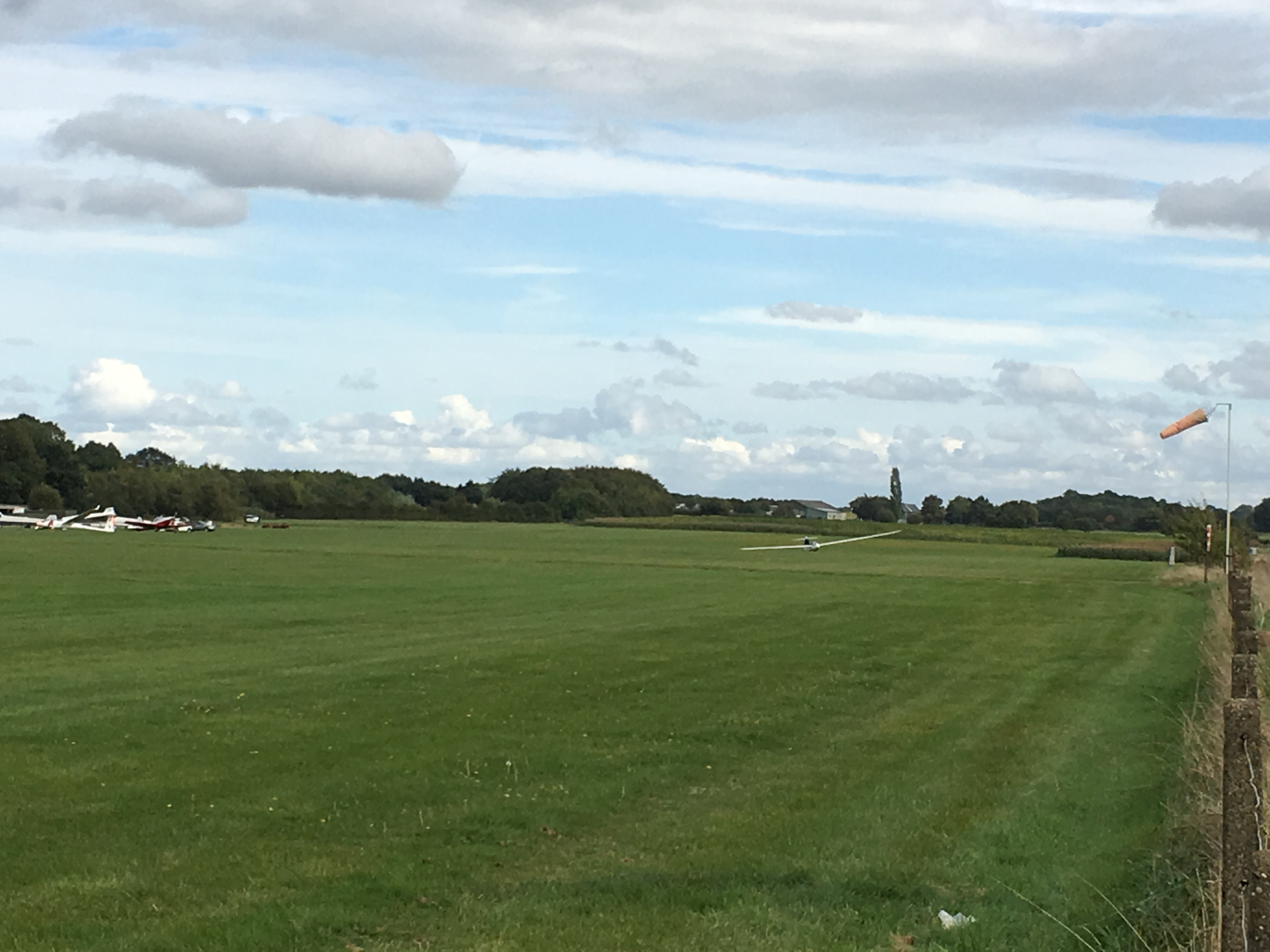
Gliders pictured in 2019 at the former RAF Husbands Bosworth
