= No. 16 Operational Training Unit RAF =

No. 16 Operational Training Unit RAF 16 OTU
- Country: United Kingdom
- Branch: Royal Air Force
- Type: Training
- Role: RAF operational training
- Garrison/HQ: RAF Upper Heyford, Oxfordshire England 1940-46; RAF Cottesmore, Rutland, England 1946–1947

Aircraft flown
- Bomber: Vickers Wellington de Havilland Mosquito

No. 16 Operational Training Unit RAF (16 OTU) was a training unit of the Royal Air Force.

It was formed at RAF Upper Heyford on 8 April 1940 from the No. 4 Group RAF Pool, which comprised No 7 and No 76 Squadron, within No. 6 Group RAF, to train night bomber crews, for which it was equipped with Handley Page Hampdens and Herefords. Transferred to No. 7 Group RAF on 15 July 1940 until 11 May 1942 when No 7 Group was renumbered No. 92 Group RAF (92 Gp), 16 OTU converted to Vickers Wellington bombers in April 1942 and from March to December 1942 its headquarters moved to RAF Barford St John whilst runways were laid at Upper Heyford, disbanding on 1 January 1945.

The unit re-formed within 92 Group the same day when the Mosquito Training Unit RAF (formerly No. 1655 (Mosquito) Conversion Unit) was re-designated as No. 16 Operational Training Unit RAF, remaining at Upper Heyford until 1 March 1946 when it moved to RAF Cottesmore, where it finally disbanded on 15 March 1947, its aircraft and personnel being used to create No. 231 Operational Conversion Unit RAF (231 OCU) and No. 204 Advanced Flying School RAF (204 AFS).
