= Cublington =

Village in England

Coordinates: 51.8926°N 0.7791°W

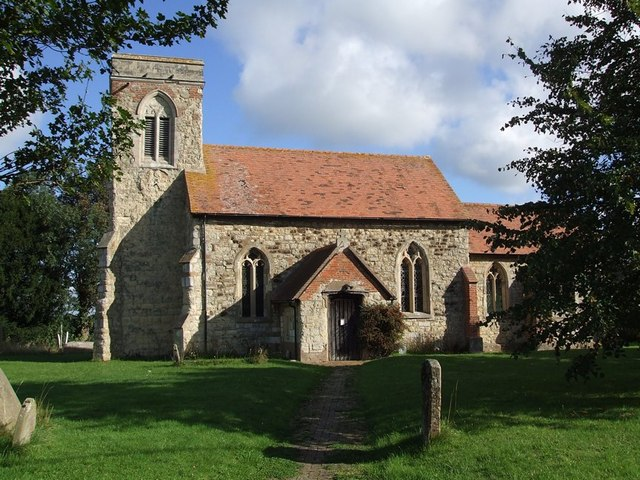
- St. Nicholas' church, Cublington

- Location within Buckinghamshire
- Population: 328 (2011 Census)
- OS grid reference: SP835225
- Civil parish: Buckingham
- Unitary authority: Buckinghamshire
- Ceremonial county: Buckinghamshire
- Region: South East
- Country: England
- Sovereign state: United Kingdom
- Post town: LEIGHTON BUZZARD
- Postcode district: LU7
- Dialling code: 01296
- Police: Thames Valley
- Fire: Buckinghamshire
- Ambulance: South Central
- UK Parliament: Aylesbury

Cublington is a village and civil parish within the Aylesbury Vale area of Buckinghamshire, England. It is about seven miles (11 km) north of Aylesbury. The village name is Anglo Saxon in origin, and means "Cubbel's estate". In the Domesday Book of 1086 it was recorded as Coblincote.

== History ==
The parish church of St Nicholas is built in the perpendicular style. The tower of the church is decorated with blank tracery windows. Inside, the chancel arch has unusual corbels of a man and a monkey. At one time there was also a Methodist Chapel in the village.

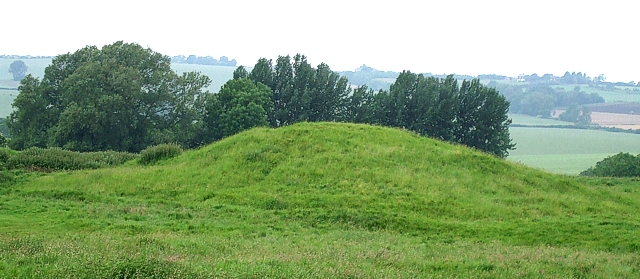
The Beacon

500 yards (460 m) from the church is a small man-made hill, about 20 ft (6.1 m). high, known as "The Beacon", it is in fact the motte of a small Norman castle.

North west of the church the 18th-century stable block of the former manor house survives. The building is made of brick, and a granary also survives built on an arcaded basement. This is rare as granaries in the area tended to be built on staddle stones. This type of agricultural building was generally raised from the ground to deter rodents.

Other houses of note include Old Manor Farm, a large low house with a recently created series of gardens; and opposite the church, the former rectory, dating from the 18th century with more recent additions, and an informal garden, open to the public once or twice a year. Neales Farm is an H plan half-timbered house dating from circa 1600.

The village has many old cottages, as well as small enclaves of newly built houses.

In 1971, the Report of the Roskill Commission on the London Airport expansion selected Cublington as the location of a proposed third airport for London on the basis of Cost Benefit Analysis. One Commission member, planner Colin Buchanan, produced a dissenting report rejecting the proposal to build on Cublington as "an environmental disaster". The government later rejected the Roskill recommendation on environmental grounds, in favour of a site at Maplin Sands, Foulness.

The village pub is called "The Unicorn".

In World War 2, the pub and village were popular destinations for personnel serving at nearby RAF Wing and the military hospital, built on the eastern edge of Cublington.

Cublington boasts two tennis courts, a trout and coarse fishing lake and a cricket club. The cricket club celebrated its 150th anniversary of the first recorded match in 2013. At senior level, the club runs 2 senior League teams on Saturdays as well as a Sunday side and an occasional Strollers Sunday side.

The nearest shop/post office and secondary school are 2.5 miles east of Cublington in the village of Wing, with Wingrave, also 2.5 miles away, offering a Church of England First and Middle school. The nearest doctor's surgery is in Wing.

There are regular bus services to Cublington from Aylesbury and Leighton Buzzard.
