= List of Royal Air Force Operational Training Units =

List of Operational Training Units (OTUs) of the British Royal Air Force (RAF)

Royal Air Force Operational Training Units (OTUs) were training units that prepared aircrew for operations on a particular type or types of aircraft or roles.

== 1 - 19 OTUs ==
Name	Formed on	Formed at	Group	RLG's used	Aircraft	Disbanded on	Notes
No. 1 (Coastal) Operational Training Unit RAF	1 April 1940	RAF Silloth	No. 17 Group RAF	RAF Speke; RAF Prestwick; RAF Kirkbride; RAF Longtown; RAF Thornaby; RAF Beaulieu; RAF Aldergrove	Lockheed Hudson; Avro Anson; Bristol Blenheim; Bristol Beaufort; Boeing Fortress; Handley Page Halifax; Consolidated Liberator; Westland Lysander; Miles Martinet	19 October 1943	
No. 2 (Coastal) Operational Training Unit RAF	1 October 1940	RAF Catfoss	No. 17 Group RAF				
No. 3 (Coastal) Operational Training Unit RAF	27 November 1940	RAF Chivenor	No. 17 Group RAF				
No. 4 (Coastal) Operational Training Unit RAF	16 March 1941	RAF Stranraer	No. 17 Group RAF				Became 235 OCU in 1947.
No. 5 Operational Training Unit RAF	15 March 1940	RAF Aston Down	No. 12 Group RAF				
No. 5 (Coastal) Operational Training Unit RAF	1 August 1941	RAF Chivenor	No. 17 Group RAF				
No. 6 Operational Training Unit RAF	6 March 1940	RAF Sutton Bridge	No. 11 Group RAF				Commanded by Squadron Leader Philip Campbell Pinkham. No. 6 OTU was re-numbered in November 1940 to No. 56 OTU
No. 6 Operational Training Unit RAF	1 June 1941	RAF Andover	No. 17 Group RAF				
No. 6 Operational Training Unit RAF	19 July 1941	RAF Thornaby	No. 17 Group RAF				
No. 7 Operational Training Unit RAF	15 June 1940	RAF Hawarden	No. 13 Group RAF				During the Battle of Britain in September 1940, it flew operational flights over north west England, claiming three enemy aircraft shot down. It became No. 57 OTU on 1 November 1940.
No. 7 (Coastal) Operational Training Unit RAF	1 April 1942	RAF Limavady	No. 17 Group RAF				
No. 8 (Coastal) Operational Training Unit RAF	18 May 1942	RAF Fraserburgh	No. 17 Group RAF				Formed by merging the Photographic Reconnaissance Conversion Flight of 3 School of General Reconnaissance and 'K' (Photographic Reconnaissance Advanced Training) Flight of 1 Photographic Reconnaissance Unit Moved to RAF Dyce February 1943 then to RAF Haverfordwest in early 1945. Became 237 OCU in 1947.
No. 9 (Coastal) Operational Training Unit RAF	7 June 1942	RAF Aldergrove	No. 17 Group RAF				
No. 10 Operational Training Unit RAF	8 April 1940	RAF Abingdon	No. 6 Group RAF				
No. 11 Operational Training Unit RAF	8 April 1940	RAF Bassingbourn	No. 6 Group RAF				During 1942, it operated seven operational night bombing missions.
No. 12 Operational Training Unit RAF	8 April 1940	RAF Benson	No. 6 Group RAF				Absorbed No. 52 Squadron RAF on 8 April 1940. During 1942, 12 OTU carried out operational night bombing missions.
No. 13 Operational Training Unit RAF	8 April 1940	RAF Bicester	No. 6 Group RAF				Became 228 OCU in 1947.
No. 14 Operational Training Unit RAF	8 April 1940	RAF Cottesmore	No. 6 Group RAF				
No. 15 Operational Training Unit RAF]	8 April 1940	RAF Harwell	No. 6 Group RAF				In 1942, it carried out seven operational missions.
No. 16 Operational Training Unit RAF	8 April 1940	RAF Upper Heyford	No. 6 Group RAF				In 1942, it carried out a number of operational sorties.
No. 16 Operational Training Unit RAF	1 January 1945	RAF Upper Heyford	No. 92 Group RAF				
No. 17 Operational Training Unit RAF	8 April 1940	RAF Upwood	No. 6 Group RAF				Became No. 201 Advanced Flying School RAF in March 1947.
No. 18 Operational Training Unit RAF	15 June 1940	RAF Hucknall	No. 6 Group RAF				In 1942, it carried out six operational sorties.
No. 19 Operational Training Unit RAF	27 May 1940	RAF Kinloss	No. 6 Group RAF				In June 1942, twelve Whitleys took part in a raid against Bremen.

== 20 - 43 OTUs ==
Name	Formed on	Formed at	Group	RLG's used	Aircraft	Disbanded on	Notes
No. 20 Operational Training Unit RAF	27 May 1940	RAF Lossiemouth	No. 6 Group RAF				
No. 21 Operational Training Unit RAF	21 January 1941	RAF Moreton-in-Marsh	No. 6 Group RAF				In 1942, it carried out a number of operational sorties. Became No. 202 Advanced Flying School RAF in March 1947.
No. 22 Operational Training Unit RAF	14 April 1941	RAF Wellesbourne Mountford	No. 6 Group RAF				
No. 23 Operational Training Unit RAF	1 April 1941	RAF Pershore	No. 6 Group RAF				In 1942, carried out operational sorties.
No. 24 Operational Training Unit RAF	15 March 1942	RAF Honeybourne	No. 7 Group RAF				In 1942, carried out three operational sorties.
No. 25 Operational Training Unit RAF	1 March 1942	RAF Finningley	No. 7 Group RAF				In 1942, carried out a number of operational raids.
No. 26 Operational Training Unit RAF	15 January 1942	RAF Wing	No. 7 Group RAF				
No. 27 Operational Training Unit RAF	23 April 1941	RAF Lichfield	No. 6 Group RAF				
No. 28 Operational Training Unit RAF	16 May 1942	RAF Wymeswold	No. 92 Group RAF				
No. 29 Operational Training Unit RAF	21 April 1942	RAF North Luffenham	No. 7 Group RAF				In 1942, carried out four operation sorties.
No. 30 Operational Training Unit RAF	28 June 1942	RAF Hixon	No. 93 Group RAF				
No. 31 Operational Training Unit RAF	23 May 1941	Debert, Canada	n/a				Carried out operational patrols in the Western Atlantic from Dartmouth.
No. 32 Operational Training Unit RAF	20 July 1941	West Kirby, Liverpool, UK	n/a				Declared an operational squadron to protect the Canadian coast from Japanese raids and re-designated No. 32 Operational Squadron on 15 December 1941. Reverted to an Operational Training Unit on 29 December 1941. Re-designated No. 6 Operational Training Unit RCAF in June 1944.
No. 34 Operational Training Unit RAF	8 April 1942	UK	n/a				
No. 36 Operational Training Unit RAF	24 February 1942	UK	n/a				
No. 41 Operational Training Unit RAF	20 September 1941	RAF Old Sarum	No. 70 Group RAF				
No. 42 Operational Training Unit RAF	18 July 1941	RAF Andover	No. 70 Group RAF				
No. 43 Operational Training Unit RAF	1 October 1942	RAF Larkhill	No. 70 Group RAF				Became No. 227 Operational Conversion Unit RAF.

== 51 - 63 OTUs ==
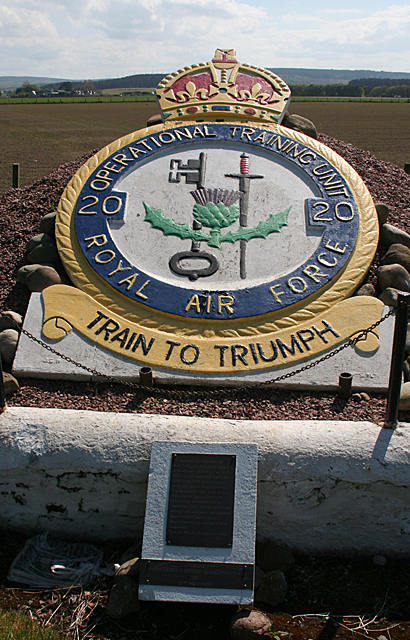
RAF 20 Operational Training Unit memorial, located at Bogs of Mayne (former RAF Elgin), Morayshire, Scotland.

Name	Formed on	Formed at	Group	RLG's used	Aircraft	Disbanded on	Notes
No. 51 Operational Training Unit RAF	26 July 1941	RAF Debden	No. 81 Group RAF				
No. 52 Operational Training Unit RAF	25 March 1941	RAF Debden	No. 81 Group RAF				
No. 53 Operational Training Unit RAF	18 February 1941	RAF Heston	No. 81 Group RAF				
No. 54 Operational Training Unit RAF	25 November 1940	RAF Church Fenton	No. 12 Group RAF				
No. 55 Operational Training Unit RAF	1 November 1940	RAF Aston Down	No. 10 Group RAF				
No. 55 Operational Training Unit RAF	18 December 1944	RAF Aston Down	No. 12 Group RAF				
No. 56 Operational Training Unit RAF	1 November 1940	RAF Sutton Bridge	No. 81 Group RAF				Previously No. 6 OTU. Became No. 1 Combat Training Wing RAF, then No. 1 Tactical Exercise Unit RAF
No. 56 Operational Training Unit RAF	15 December 1944	RAF Milfield	No. 12 Group RAF				
No. 57 Operational Training Unit RAF	1 November 1940	RAF Hawarden	No. 10 Group RAF				
No. 58 Operational Training Unit RAF	2 December 1940	RAF Grangemouth	No. 10 Group RAF				Became No. 2 Combat Training Wing RAF, then No. 2 Tactical Exercise Unit RAF
No. 58 Operational Training Unit RAF	12 March 1945	RAF Poulton	No. 12 Group RAF				
No. 59 Operational Training Unit RAF	16 December 1940	RAF Turnhouse	No. 13 Group RAF				
No. 59 Operational Training Unit RAF	26 February 1945	RAF Acklington	n/a				
No. 60 Operational Training Unit RAF	28 April 1941	RAF Leconfield	No. 81 Group RAF				In November 1942, it was renumbered 132 OTU. No. 60 OTU was re-formed in May 1943.
No. 60 Operational Training Unit RAF	17 May 1943	RAF High Ercall	No. 9 Group RAF				
No. 61 Operational Training Unit RAF	9 June 1941	RAF Heston	No. 81 Group RAF				Became No. 203 Advanced Flying School RAF
No. 62 Operational Training Unit RAF	1 June 1942	RAF Usworth	No. 81 Group RAF				
No. 63 Operational Training Unit RAF	7 September 1943	RAF Honiley	No. 9 Group RAF				

== 70 - 86 OTUs ==
Name	Formed on	Formed at	Group	RLG's used	Aircraft	Disbanded on	Notes
No. 70 (Middle East) Operational Training Unit RAF	10 December 1940	RAF Ismailia	n/a				Located at RAF Shandur 21 May 1943 - 16 July 1945, equipped with Marauders and later Bristol Blenheims.
No. 71 Operational Training Unit RAF	1 June 1941	RAF Ismailia	No. 202 Group RAF				From June to September 1941 it provided night defence of the Canal Zone (Suez Canal)
No. 72 Operational Training Unit RAF	10 November 1941	RAF Cathargo	n/a				
No. 73 Operational Training Unit RAF	30 November 1941	RAF Sheikh Othman	No. 207 Group RAF				
No. 74 Operational Training Unit RAF	18 October 1941	RAF Aqir	No. 203 Group RAF				
No. 75 Operational Training Unit RAF	8 December 1942	RAF Gianaclis	No. 203 Group RAF				
No. 76 Operational Training Unit RAF	1 October 1943	RAF Aqir	n/a				
No. 77 Operational Training Unit RAF	1 April 1944	RAF Qastina	No. 203 Group RAF				
No. 78 Operational Training Unit RAF	1 February 1944	RAF Ein Shemer	n/a				
No. 79 Operational Training Unit RAF	1 February 1944	RAF Nicosia	n/a				
No. 80 (French) Operational Training Unit RAF	23 April 1945	RAF Morpeth	No. 12 Group RAF				
No. 81 Operational Training Unit RAF	10 July 1942	RAF Ashbourne	No. 93 Group RAF				Became No. 1380 (Transport) Conversion Unit RAF
No. 82 Operational Training Unit RAF	1 June 1943	RAF Ossington	No. 93 Group RAF				
No. 83 Operational Training Unit RAF	1 August 1943	RAF Childs Ercall	No. 93 Group RAF				
No. 84 Operational Training Unit RAF	1 September 1943	RAF Desborough	No. 92 Group RAF				
No. 85 Operational Training Unit RAF	15 June 1944	RAF Husbands Bosworth	No. 92 Group RAF				
No. 86 Operational Training Unit RAF	15 June 1944	RAF Gamston	No. 93 Group RAF				

== 101 - 152 OTUs ==
Name	Formed on	Formed at	Group	RLG's used	Aircraft	Disbanded on	Notes
No. 101 (Glider) Operational Training Unit RAF	1 January 1942	RAF Kidlington	No. 70 Group RAF	RAF Kiddington (Glympton); RAF Slade Farm	General Aircraft Hotspur	13 July 1942	Became No. 4 Glider Training School RAF
No. 102 (Glider) Operational Training Unit RAF	10 February 1942	RAF Kidlington	No. 70 Group RAF	RAF Kiddington (Glympton); RAF Slade Farm	Hawker Hector; Hawker Hind; Hotspur	30 June 1942	Became No. 5 Glider Training School RAF
No. 104 (Transport) Operational Training Unit RAF	12 March 1943	RAF Nutts Corner	No. 44 Group RAF	RAF Toome; RAF Maghaberry; RAF Mullaghmore	Vickers Wellington	5 February 1944	
No. 105 (Transport) Operational Training Unit RAF	5 April 1943	RAF Bramcote	No. 44 Group RAF	RAF Nuneaton; RAF Bitteswell; RAF Crosby-on-Eden	Wellington; Douglas Dakota	10 August 1945	Became No. 1381 (Transport) Conversion Unit RAF
No. 107 (Transport) Operational Training Unit RAF	3 May 1944	RAF Leicester East	No. 46 Group RAF	RAF Ringway; RAF Melton Mowbray; RAF Zeals	Dakota; Airspeed Horsa; Airspeed Oxford; Waco Hadrian	12 March 1945	Became No. 1333 (Transport Support) Conversion Unit RAF
No. 108 (Transport) Operational Training Unit RAF	10 October 1944	RAF Wymeswold	No. 44 Group RAF	RAF Castle Donington	Dakota; Oxford; Horsa	10 August 1945	Became No. 1382 (Transport) Conversion Unit RAF
No. 109 (Transport) Operational Training Unit RAF	1 August 1944	RAF Crosby-on-Eden	No. 44 Group RAF	RAF Down Ampney; RAF Blakehill Farm	Dakota; Oxford; Horsa	10 August 1945	Became No. 1383 (Transport) Conversion Unit RAF
No. 111 (Coastal) Operational Training Unit RAF	20 August 1942	RAF Oakes Field	No. 17 Group RAF	Windsor Field; RAF Lossiemouth; RAF Milltown	North American B-25 Mitchell; Consolidated B-24 Liberator; Wellington	21 May 1946	
No. 131 (Coastal) Operational Training Unit RAF	20 July 1942	RAF Killadeas	No. 15 Group RAF	RAF Lough Erne; RAF Boa Island	Consolidated Catalina; Short Sunderland; Oxford; Miles Martinet; Hawker Hurricane	28 June 1945	
No. 132 (Coastal) Operational Training Unit RAF	24 November 1942	RAF East Fortune	No. 17 Group RAF	RAF Macmerry	Bristol Blenheim; Bristol Beaufighter; Oxford; Bristol Beaufort; Westland Lysander de Havilland Mosquito	15 May 1946	
No. 151 (Fighter) Operational Training Unit RAF	28 July 1942	RAF Risalpur	No. 227 Group RAF	RAF Ambala	Curtiss Mohawk; North American Harvard; Hurricane; Vultee Vengeance	1 April 1946	Absorbed into Advanced Flying School (India)
No. 152 (Bomber) Operational Training Unit RAF	22 October 1942	RAF Peshawar	No. 227 Group RAF		Harvard; Vengeance	12 March 1944	Disbanded into No. 151 (F) OTU
No. 1 Operational Training Unit, India	1 April 1942	RAF Risalpur	No. 1 (Indian) Group RAF		Mohawk; Harvard; Hurricane	28 July 1942	Became No. 151 (F) OTU

== See also ==
Royal Air Force

- List of Royal Air Force aircraft squadrons
- List of Royal Air Force aircraft independent flights
- List of conversion units of the Royal Air Force
- List of Royal Air Force Glider units
- List of Royal Air Force schools
- List of Royal Air Force units & establishments
- List of RAF squadron codes
- List of RAF Regiment units
- List of Battle of Britain squadrons
- List of wings of the Royal Air Force
- Royal Air Force roundels

Army Air Corps

- List of Army Air Corps aircraft units

Fleet Air Arm

- List of Fleet Air Arm aircraft squadrons
- List of Fleet Air Arm groups
- List of aircraft units of the Royal Navy
- List of aircraft wings of the Royal Navy

Others

- List of Air Training Corps squadrons
- University Air Squadron
- Air Experience Flight
- Volunteer Gliding Squadron
- United Kingdom military aircraft serial numbers
- United Kingdom aircraft test serials
- British military aircraft designation systems
