= Roskill Commission =

1968–1970 UK government commission on London airports

The four sites shortlisted by the Roskill Commission

The Roskill Commission (formally the Commission on the Third London Airport) was a UK government commission charged with looking into finding a site for a new airport for London. Chaired by High Court judge Sir Eustace Roskill, it sat from 1968 to 1970 and published its report in January 1971.

Since the 1950s, London's primary passenger airport had been at Heathrow, with a second one at Gatwick. The commission's aim was "to enquire into the timing of the need for a four-runway airport to cater for the growth of traffic at existing airports serving the London area, to consider the various alternative sites, and to recommend which site should be selected."

Roskill's initial list of 78 sites was reduced to an intermediate list of 29, before detailed consideration of four short-listed locations:

- Cublington
- Foulness
- Nuthampstead
- Thurleigh

The Commission recommended that a site at Cublington near Wing in Buckinghamshire (to the north-west of London) should be developed as London's third airport.

The UK government rejected the commission's proposal for Cublington, but accepted a dissenting report by a member of the commission, Colin Buchanan, which recommended that a new airport should be developed at Foulness (later known as Maplin Sands) in Essex.

An act of parliament was passed – the Maplin Development Act 1973 – that paved the way for a Thames Estuary Airport at Maplin Sands. However, the airport proposal was shelved after the 1973 oil crisis, and plans for a new third airport were replaced by smaller-scale redevelopment of Stansted, a site not short-listed by the Roskill Commission.

In 2012 the UK government established the independent Airports Commission to look again at the future of London's airports.

== Panel ==
The members of the seven-man Commission were:

- Hon. Mr. Justice Roskill
- Colin Buchanan, Professor of Transport, Imperial College of Science and Technology
- Alfred Goldstein, Partner in R. Travers Morgan & Partners, Consulting Engineers
- Arthur J. Hunt, Principal Planning Inspector, Ministry of Housing and Local Government
- David Keith-Lucas, Professor of Aircraft Design, the College of Aeronautics, Cranfield; and President of the Royal Aeronautical Society
- Arthur William Knight, Finance Director, Courtaulds Limited
- Alan Walters, Professor of Econometrics and Social Statistics, University of Birmingham (later Cassel Professor of Economics in the University of London).

== See also ==
- Expansion of Heathrow Airport
