= List of Bristol Beaufort operators =

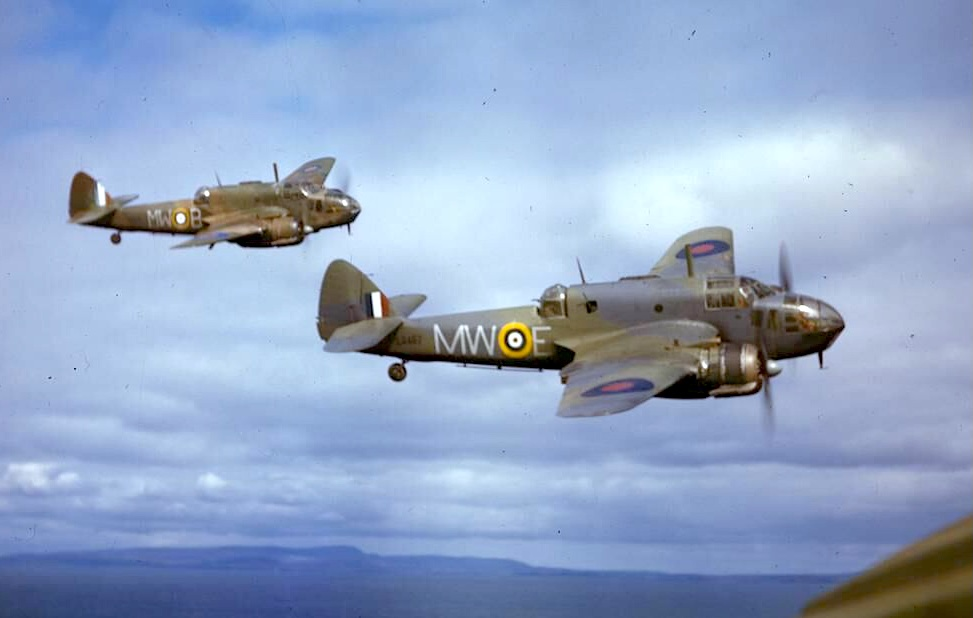

This page is a list of countries which used the Bristol Beaufort, along with their units:

== Operators ==
=== Australia ===
Royal Australian Air Force

- No. 1 Squadron RAAF operated Beauforts between December 1943 and June 1945.
- No. 2 Squadron RAAF operated Beauforts between December 1943 and September 1944.
- No. 6 Squadron RAAF operated Beauforts between August 1943 and January 1946.
- No. 7 Squadron RAAF operated Beauforts between December 1942 and December 1945.
- No. 8 Squadron RAAF operated Beauforts between March 1943 and February 1946.
- No. 13 Squadron RAAF operated Beauforts between August 1943 and May 1944.
- No. 14 Squadron RAAF operated Beauforts between December 1942 and November 1945.
- No. 15 Squadron RAAF operated Beauforts between January 1944 and November 1945.
- No. 21 Squadron RAAF operated Beauforts between January and August 1946.
- No. 22 Squadron RAAF operated Beauforts until October 1945.
- No. 30 Squadron RAAF operated Beauforts in August 1942 and later between January 1944 and September 1945.
- No. 31 Squadron RAAF operated Beauforts between August 1942 and October 1945.
- No. 32 Squadron RAAF operated Beauforts between March 1943 and November 1945.
- No. 36 Squadron RAAF operated Beauforts between March and June 1946.
- No. 92 Squadron RAAF operated Beauforts between July and September 1945.
- No. 93 Squadron RAAF operated Beauforts between July 1945 and May 1946.
- No. 100 Squadron RAAF operated Beauforts between February 1942 and August 1946.
- No. 1 Communication Unit RAAF
- No. 3 Communication Unit RAAF
- No. 4 Communication Unit RAAF
- No. 5 Communication Unit RAAF
- No. 6 Communication Unit RAAF
- No. 8 Communication Unit RAAF
- No. 11 Communication Unit RAAF
- No. 9 Local Air Supply Unit RAAF
- No. 10 Local Air Supply Unit RAAF
- No. 12 Local Air Supply Unit RAAF
- No. 1 Aircraft Performance Unit RAAF
- No. 1 Operational Training Unit RAAF operated Beauforts between April 1942 and July 1946.
- No. 5 Operational Training Unit RAAF operated Beauforts between October 1942 and February 1946.
- No. 6 Operational Training Unit RAAF operated Beauforts between July 1943 and July 1944.

=== Canada ===
Royal Canadian Air Force

- No. 149 Squadron RCAF operated Beauforts transferred from 32 (C) OTU between November 1942 and August 1943.
- No. 415 Squadron RCAF operated Beauforts between September 1941 and January 1942.

=== New Zealand ===
New Zealand received six aircraft and after withdrawing the type from active service returned four aircraft to the RAF.

Royal New Zealand Air Force

- No. 489 Squadron RNZAF operated Beauforts between August 1941 and April 1942.

=== South Africa ===
South Africa received 18 aircraft early 1941 and next 40 aircraft in June 1943.

South African Air Force

- No. 16 Squadron SAAF operated Beauforts between September and November 1942 and later between June 1943 and February 1944.
- No. 20 Squadron SAAF operated Beauforts between July and September 1942.
- No. 22 Squadron SAAF operated Beauforts between August 1942 and February 1943.
- No. 23 Squadron SAAF operated Beauforts between July 1942 and October 1943.
- No. 36 Coastal Flight SAAF operated Beauforts between January and July 1942.
- No. 37 Coastal Flight SAAF operated Beauforts between February and July 1942.

=== Turkey ===
At least eleven, but more likely twelve Beaufort IAs were delivered to Turkey in 1944 and another twelve were delivered in 1945. All twenty-four were assigned to 105 TRG TAF and were operated until 1950.

Turkish Air Force

- 105th Torpedo and Reconnaissance Group TAF operated Beauforts between February 1944 and 1950.

=== United Kingdom ===
Royal Air Force

- No. 22 Squadron RAF operated Beauforts between November 1939 and August 1944
- No. 39 Squadron RAF operated Beauforts between September 1941 and January 1944.
- No. 42 Squadron RAF operated Beauforts between April 1940 and April 1943.
- No. 47 Squadron RAF operated Beauforts between August 1942 and June 1943.
- No. 48 Squadron RAF operated Beauforts between May and October 1940.
- No. 69 Squadron RAF operated Beauforts between August and September 1941.
- No. 86 Squadron RAF operated Beauforts between May 1941 and November 1943.
- No. 100 Squadron RAF operated Beauforts between October 1941 and February 1942.
- No. 217 Squadron RAF operated Beauforts between May 1940 and September 1944.
- No. 235 Squadron RAF operated Beauforts between March 1944 and June 1944.
- No. 511 Squadron RAF operated Beauforts between December 1942 and January 1943.
- No. 222 Group Photographic Flight RAF operated Beauforts between June and December 1944.
- No. 1 (Coastal) Operational Training Unit RAF operated Beauforts between April and November 1940.
- No. 2 (Coastal) Operational Training Unit RAF operated Beauforts between September and December 1941 and later between January 1943 and May 1944.
- No. 3 (Coastal) Operational Training Unit RAF operated Beauforts between November 1940 and August 1941.
- No. 5 (Coastal) Operational Training Unit RAF operated Beauforts between August 1941 and November 1944.
- No. 9 (Coastal) Operational Training Unit RAF operated Beauforts between July 1942 and August 1944.
- No. 32 (Coastal) Operational Training Unit RAF operated Beauforts between September 1941 and April 1943.
- No. 132 (Coastal) Operational Training Unit RAF operated Beauforts between July 1943 and May 1946.
- No. 51 (Fighter) Operational Training Unit RAF operated Beauforts between January 1943 and March 1945.
- No. 54 (Fighter) Operational Training Unit RAF operated Beauforts between January 1943 and June 1945.
- No. 60 (Fighter) Operational Training Unit RAF operated Beauforts between July and August 1943.
- No. 63 (Fighter) Operational Training Unit RAF operated Beauforts between August 1943 and July 1944.
- No. 75 (Fighter) Operational Training Unit RAF operated Beauforts in 1943.
- Torpedo Training Unit RAF operated Beauforts between June 1940 and November 1942.
- No. 1 Torpedo Training Unit RAF operated Beauforts between January 1943 and March 1944.
- No. 2 Torpedo Training Unit RAF operated Beauforts between January and September 1943.

Fleet Air Arm

- 728 Naval Air Squadron operated Beauforts between October 1944 and September 1945.
- 733 Naval Air Squadron operated Beauforts between February 1944 and June 1945.
- 762 Naval Air Squadron operated Beauforts between March 1944 and March 1946.
- 788 Naval Air Squadron operated Beauforts between early 1945 and June 1945.
- 798 Naval Air Squadron operated Beauforts between October 1943 and March 1944.

== See also ==
- Bristol Beaufort
