= XCH =

XCH is a three-letter acronym that can mean:

- an EXCHANGE instruction in the IBM 1130 and the Apollo Guidance Computer
- The IATA airport code for Christmas Island Airport
