= List of airports in territories of Australia =

This is a list of airports in the territories of Australia, excluding the Northern Territory, for which there is a separate list.

== List of airports ==
The list is sorted by the name of the community served, click the sort buttons in the table header to switch listing order. Airports named in bold are Designated International Airports, even if they have limited or no scheduled international services.

Community	Territory	Airport name	Type	ICAO	IATA	Coordinates
Canberra	Australian Capital Territory	**Canberra Airport**	Public	YSCB	CBR	35°18′25″S 149°11′42″E
Flying Fish Cove	Christmas Island	**Christmas Island Airport**	Public	YPXM	XCH	10°27′02″S 105°41′25″E
West Island	Cocos (Keeling) Islands	**Cocos (Keeling) Islands Airport**	Public	YPCC	CCK	12°11′19″S 096°49′50″E
Jervis Bay Village	Jervis Bay Territory	Jervis Bay Airport	Military	YJBY		35°08′48″S 150°41′48″E
Burnt Pine	Norfolk Island	**Norfolk Island Airport**	Public	YSNF	NLK	29°02′33″S 167°56′17″E
Peterson Glacier	Australian Antarctic Territory	**Wilkins Runway**	Private	YWKS		66°41′27″S 111°31′25″E

== Defunct airports ==
Community	Territory	Airport name	Type	ICAO	IATA	Coordinates
Canberra	Australian Capital Territory	RAAF Base Fairbairn	Military	YSCB	CBR	35°18′07″S 149°12′07″E

== See also ==
- List of airports in Australia
