= Wilkins Aerodrome =

Australian single runway aerodrome in Antarctica

- IATA: none; ICAO: YWKS

Summary
- Airport type: Private
- Operator: Australian Antarctic Division
- Serves: Australian Antarctic Territory
- Location: Wilkes Land, Antarctica
- Elevation AMSL: 2,529 ft (771 m)
- Coordinates: 66°41′27″S 111°31′25″E

Map
- Location in Antarctica

Runways
Direction	Length		Surface
Direction	m	ft	Surface
09T/27T	3,200	10,499	Ice
- Sources: Australian AIP aerodrome chart

Wilkins Aerodrome is a single-runway aerodrome operated by Australia, located on upper glacier of the ice sheet Preston Heath, Budd Coast, Wilkes Land, on the continent of Antarctica, but 40 km (25 mi) southeast of the actual coast. It is named after Sir Hubert Wilkins, a pioneer of Antarctic aviation and exploration.

== History ==
Construction of a runway in the Australian Antarctic Territory was first suggested in the 1950s, but logistical, political and environmental issues delayed construction of the runway until 2004. The A$46 million dollar runway is carved into glacial ice, approximately 65 km (40 mi) from the Australian base at Casey Station.

In order to be approved by Australia's Civil Aviation Safety Authority (CASA), Wilkins must be levelled to runway standard with the use of lasers and requires a crew of eight to maintain the level and friction of the runway before each landing.

== Activities ==
CASA issued an aviation licence for the airline Skytraders to operate passenger flights, and the first flight was made on 11 January 2008, carrying Australia's then Environment Minister Peter Garrett, twelve scientists and six other passengers.

Flights to Antarctica leave from Hobart Airport in Tasmania using an Airbus A319, and the flight takes around four hours. Prior to the runway's completion, the trip to Antarctica involved a ten-day journey by ship across the Southern Ocean from Hobart. The runway operates only during the Antarctic summer, and twenty to thirty flights per season are planned. The flights are used to transport scientists conducting Antarctic research, and are not available for tourist flights. However, since the opening of the runway, no more than 10 flights in one season have been achieved. This is primarily due to environmental conditions at the site, temperatures being warmer and causing melt of the runway, thus decreasing the window of opportunity to use the runway. As of January 2012, only four flights were planned for the summer season and all in February 2012.

In 2015, the Royal Australian Air Force and the Australian Antarctic Division commenced cargo flights from Hobart Airport to Wilkins Runway using C-17 Globemaster aircraft. The service will also be used for medical evacuations, if required. The C-17 was used as a faster and more frequent alternative to the Aurora Australis supply vessel.

In March 2022, Wilkins reported 15 successful flights.

== Airlines and destinations ==
Airlines	Destinations
Skytraders	Seasonal Charter: Hobart
Royal Air Force	Troll Airfield

== See also ==
- List of airports in territories of Australia
- List of airports in Antarctica
- Aviation transport in Australia
