= Jervis Bay Airfield =

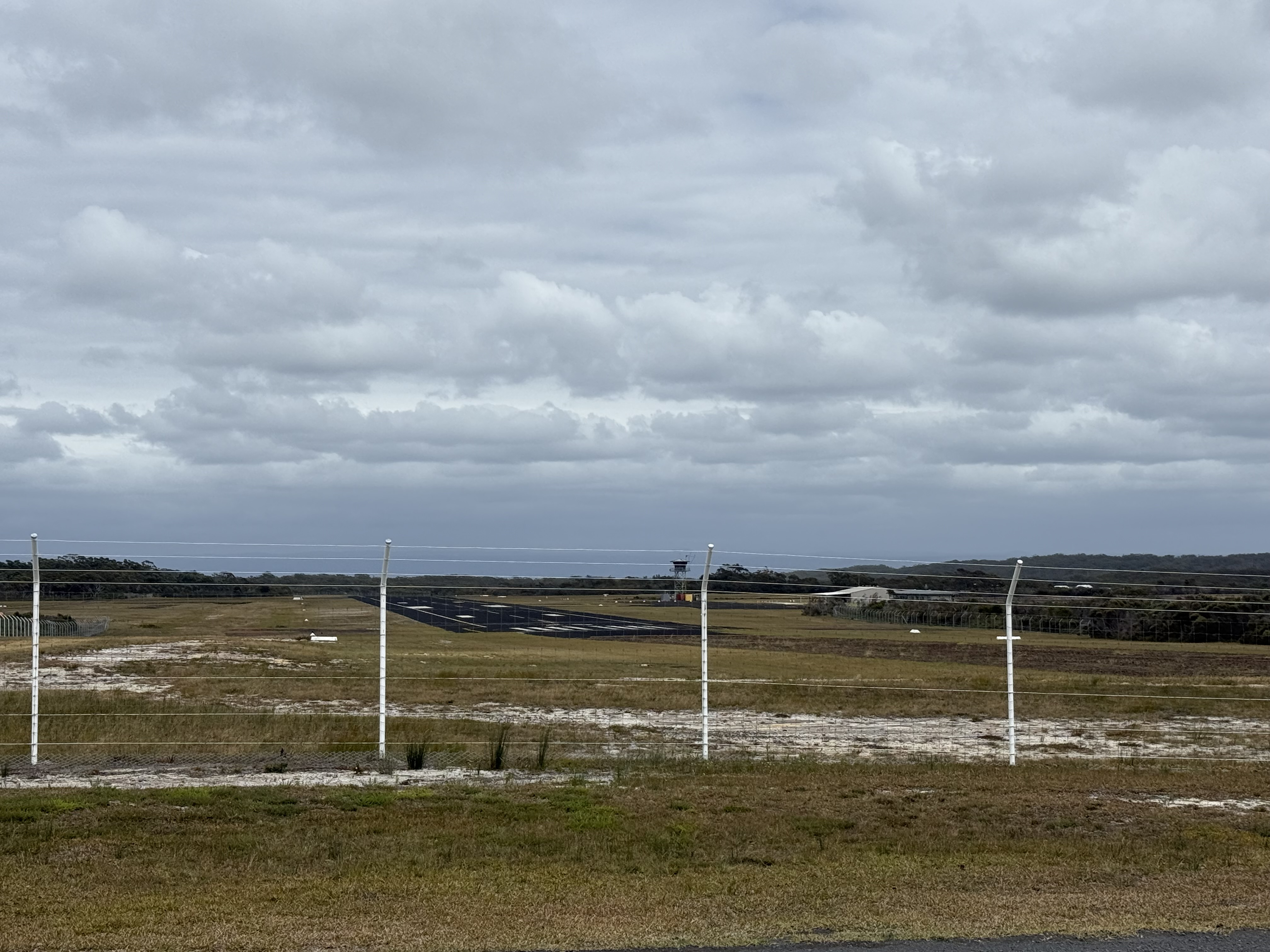
- The airfield at Jervis Bay Range Facility, January 2026
- IATA: none; ICAO: YJBY

Summary
- Airport type: Military
- Operator: RAN
- Location: Jervis Bay
- Elevation AMSL: 200 ft / 61 m
- Coordinates: 35°08′48″S 150°41′48″E

Map
- Location in Jervis Bay Territory

Runways
Direction	Length		Surface
Direction	m	ft	Surface
08/26 (Including non-landing zone)	1,919	6,296	Asphalt
15/33	1,522	4,993	Asphalt
- Sources: AIP

Jervis Bay Airfield (ICAO: YJBY) is a military aerodrome in the Jervis Bay Territory in Australia. It is the only aerodrome in the territory and is located about 10 km (6.2 mi) east of Sussex Inlet; and about 2 km (1.2 mi) south of Jervis Bay Village and HMAS Creswell.

It was opened in 1941 as a satellite airfield of Royal Australian Air Force Base Nowra (now HMAS Albatross). It was primarily used to support torpedo training by No. 6 Operational Training Unit RAAF and search and rescue operations during World War II. During 1945 it was home to the Royal Navy Mobile Naval Air Base MONAB V (HMS Nabswick) and several Fleet Air Arm squadrons of the British Pacific Fleet.

The airfield was transferred to the Royal Australian Navy (RAN) in 1948. It continued to be used as a base for the RAN's GAF Jindivik pilotless target aircraft. Today the RAN's British Aerospace MQM-107E Kalkara Flight is based at the airfield, along with the RAN School of Ship Survivability and Safety that has fire and damage control (flooding) training facilities.

== See also ==
- List of airports in territories of Australia
