= Fairbairn, Canberra =

Former military air base in Canberra, Australian Capital Territory

RAAF Base Fairbairn
- Canberra, Australian Capital Territory in Australia
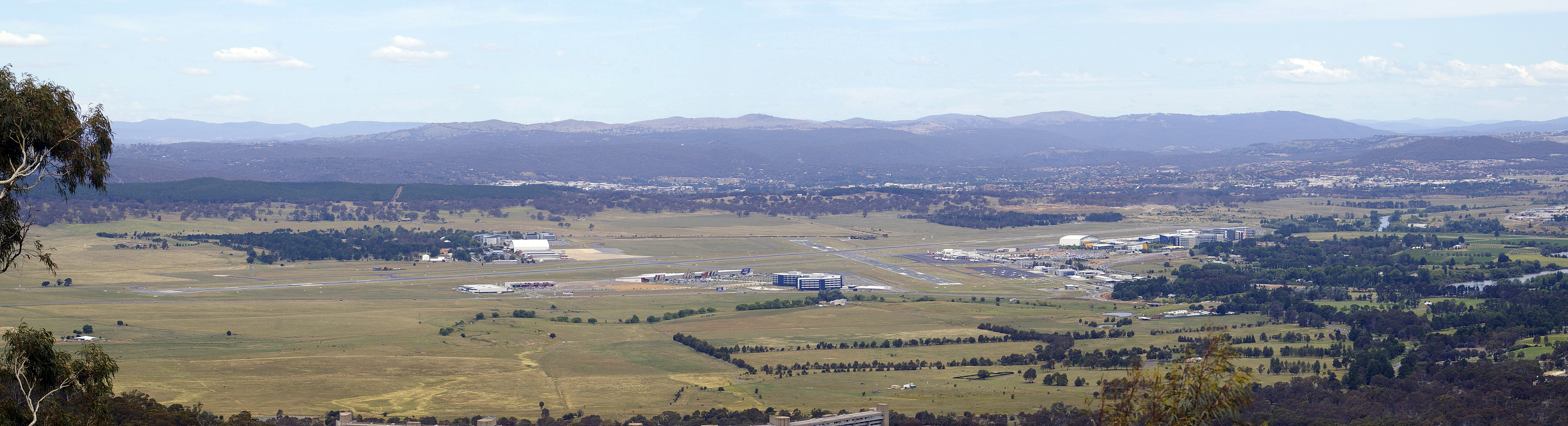
- Fairbairn viewed from Mount Ainslie

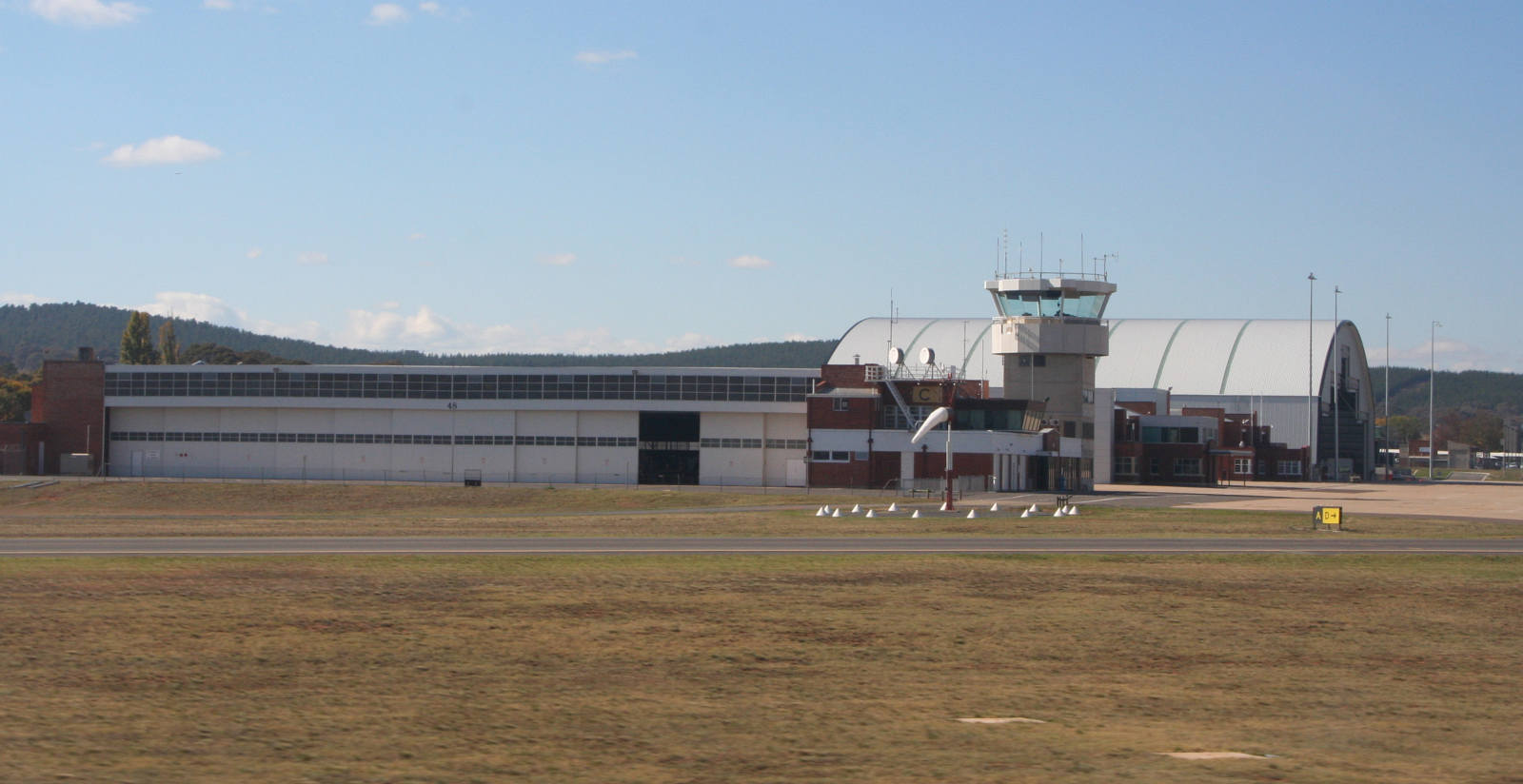
- Fairbairn hangars and air traffic control tower viewed from the main runway

Site information
- Type: Former military air base
- Operator: Royal Australian Air Force

Location
- Location in the Australian Capital Territory
- Coordinates: 35°18′07″S 149°12′07″E

Site history
- In use: 1 April 1940 – 27 June 2003

Fairbairn (/fɛərbɜːrn/), formerly RAAF Base Fairbairn, is a former Royal Australian Air Force (RAAF) military air base, located in Australia's national capital, Canberra, Australian Capital Territory. Over the years the name of the establishment, and the use of the land, has changed. The base was in use by the RAAF between 1940 and 2007, when the land occupied north and east of the Canberra Airport runways was sold to Capital Airport Pty Limited for the purposes of advancing civil aviation and the development of a business park.

A speedway, motorbike and go kart track are present in the Canberra Motorsport Precinct located 2 km from Canberra Airport.

== Defence use ==
=== RAAF base ===
RAAF squadrons were permanently based at the Canberra Aerodrome from 1939. The base was formally established as RAAF Station Canberra on 1 April 1940. In 1941 part of the airport was named Fairbairn Airbase after the late Minister for Air and Civil Aviation James Fairbairn, Member of the Australian House of Representatives, who was killed in an aircraft crash in the proximity of the airfield on 13 August 1940.

A joint Dutch East Indies-Australian medium bomber unit, No. 18 (Netherlands East Indies) Squadron RAAF was formed at Fairbairn on 4 April 1942, paving the way for other such units. 18 (NEI) Sqn was drawn initially from two groups of ethnic Dutch and Indonesian personnel, who had been evacuated from Japanese occupied Indonesia to either RAAF Archerfield, Queensland or Melbourne. Under the command of Lieutenant Colonel B. J. Fiedeldij of the Military Aviation of the Royal Netherlands East Indies Army (KNIL-ML), the staff of 18 (NEI) Sqn was complemented by a number of RAAF personnel, including both aviators and ground staff. After it had become fully operational with North American B-25 Mitchells, 18 (NEI) RAAF was deployed to, and carried out missions throughout the South West Pacific theatre.

The base became Headquarters RAAF Canberra in 1952. In December 1960 the base was selected as the locality for the RAAF Staff College, and in 1962, the area was renamed RAAF Base Fairbairn.

Fairbairn was an important location for military helicopter training, with No. 5 Squadron RAAF being located there from 1966 until 1989. From 1990 to 1998 the Australian Defence Force Helicopter School was located at Fairbairn. One of the school's successor units, the Army Helicopter School, remained at Fairbairn until 2001.

=== Defence Establishment Fairbairn ===
The Defence Reform Program (DRP) determined the base was no longer required and on 28 May 1998 the lease on the base was sold to Canberra International Airport Pty Ltd. Part of the base was sub-leased back to the Australian Department of Defence on a five-year lease to allow the progressive wind up of operations. The base was decommissioned on 27 June 2003 and the domestic area became known as Defence Establishment Fairbairn, with Canberra International Airport and the Capital Airport Group having full control of the airfield and the site.

The only remaining military unit is No. 34 Squadron RAAF, which is responsible for the operations of the RAAF's VIP transport aircraft that are used to transport Australian officials such as the Prime Minister, cabinet ministers, the Governor General, the leader of the opposition and high ranking defence force officers when travelling both internationally or within Australia.

Besides being the home base of No 34 Squadron's special purpose VIP BBJ1s and Bombardier Challenger 604s, Fairbairn is also regularly used by other defence force aircraft.

The airport is used by official aircraft carrying foreign heads of state or government when visiting Canberra, for example when the US President visits Canberra, Air Force One lands there.

Fairbairn was also home to No. 28 Squadron (Active Reserve Squadron) until it was relocated to HMAS Harman when Fairbairn was decommissioned.

== Business park ==
In 2006, Canberra International Airport Pty Ltd, and the airport management company Capital Airport Group Pty Ltd, jointly released a prospectus and embarked on a building program in the area now called "Fairbairn". These new buildings have been leased and are occupied by the Department of Defence and other tenants.

The Therapeutic Goods Administration proposed to relocate its offices and laboratories to Fairbairn from a site in Symonston of which it had been a tenant since 1992 in 2020. The relocation began in 2022.

In July 2022, Transport Canberra and Canberra Airport announced a three-month trial for a shuttle bus loop service from the airport to Fairbairn. The route is served by Hino Poncho buses and operates on weekdays from 7am until 10am and 4pm to 7pm.

=== Sports ===
Fairbairn Golf Club is an 18-hole golf course open to members and visitors.

== See also ==
- List of airports in territories of Australia
