= Australian Defence Force Helicopter School =

- Active: 1990–1998
- Branch: Australian Army (with a Royal Australian Navy element)
- Role: Training
- Location: RAAF Base Fairbairn

Aircraft flown
- Trainer helicopter: Eurocopter AS350 Écureuil; Bell UH-1 Iroquois

The Australian Defence Force Helicopter School (ADFHS) was an Australian Defence Force unit responsible for training helicopter pilots. It was formed in 1990 and disbanded in 1998.

== History ==
The school was established at RAAF Base Fairbairn in Canberra in January 1990. While it formed part of the Australian Army's Training Command, more than half of the members of the Royal Australian Air Force's No. 5 Squadron (which was previously responsible for helicopter pilot training) were transferred to the school when the squadron was disbanded in December 1989.

As of April 1990, the ADFHS was equipped with Eurocopter AS350 Écureuils which were used to train Australian military pilots as well as Bell UH-1 Iroquois which were used to train members of the Papua New Guinea Defence Force and other militaries as part of Australia's Defence Cooperation Program. Trainee Australian pilots were posted to the school after completing basic flight training at No. 1 Flying Training School RAAF. The ADFHS then provided these pilots with initial helicopter training. After gaining their wings at the ADFHS, Army pilots completed their training at the School of Army Aviation in Oakey, Queensland.

In May 1991 it was announced that the ADFHS was to be relocated to Oakey. This transfer did not occur, however.

In 1998 a review of the ADF's helicopter training arrangements recommended that the ADFHS be disbanded. The Australian Government accepted this recommendation. That year, the Army elements of the unit became the Army Helicopter School and the Royal Australian Navy elements were relocated to HMAS Albatross near Nowra, New South Wales. The Army Helicopter School was transferred to Oakey in 2001.

Initial helicopter training for ADF members was re-centralised in January 2018, when the Joint Helicopter Aircrew Training School opened at HMAS Albatross. This unit is responsible for training pilots for both the Army and Navy.
