= Cocos (Keeling) Islands Airport =

Airport in the Cocos Islands

Cocos (Keeling) Islands Airport Lapangan Terbang Pulu Kokos (Cocos Islands Malay)
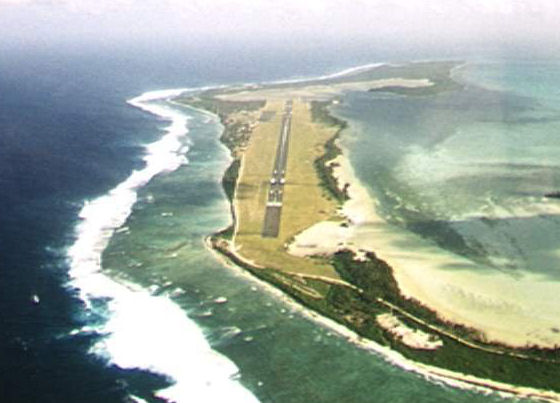
- Aerial view in the direction of Runway 33
- IATA: CCK; ICAO: YPCC

Summary
- Airport type: Public
- Operator: Toll Remote Logistics
- Location: West Island, Cocos (Keeling) Islands
- Elevation AMSL: 10 ft (3.0 m)
- Coordinates: 12°11′19″S 096°49′50″E
- Website: cocosislandairport.com.au

Map
- Location within Cocos (Keeling) Islands Location within Southeast Asia Location within Indian Ocean

Runways
Direction	Length		Surface
Direction	m	ft	Surface
15/33	2,441	8,009	Asphalt

Statistics (2010/11 (Note: Fiscal year 1 July – 30 June))
- Passengers: 15,712
- Aircraft movements: 303
- Sources: Australian AIP and aerodrome chart Passenger and aircraft movements from the BITRE

Cocos (Keeling) Islands Airport (Cocos Islands Malay: Lapangan Terbang Pulu Kokos (Keeling)) (IATA: CCK, ICAO: YPCC) is an airport serving the Cocos (Keeling) Islands, a territory of Australia located in the Indian Ocean. The airport is on West Island, one of the South Keeling Islands and capital of the territory.

== History ==
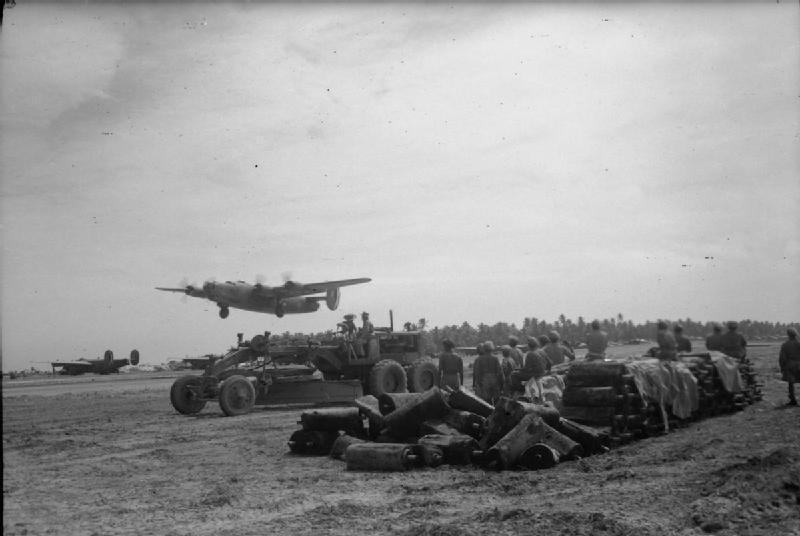
British Liberator taking off to bomb Japanese airfields in Sumatra

In 1945, the Royal Engineers constructed an airfield on the West Island, and 21,900 coconut trees were chopped to make way. The land at the time was owned by the Clunies-Ross family, who claimed £87,600 in compensation. Two steel-plated airstrips were built, and three bomber squadrons were moved to the islands to conduct raids against Japanese targets in Southeast Asia and to provide support during the planned re-invasion of Malaya and reconquest of Singapore. The first aircraft to arrive were Supermarine Spitfire Mk VIIIs of No. 136 Squadron RAF. They included some B-24 Liberator bombers from No. 321 (Netherlands) Squadron RAF (members of exiled Dutch forces serving with the Royal Air Force), which were also stationed on the islands.

Qantas Empire Airways utilised the airport as a stopover to relink Perth and Ceylon, with its Avro Lancastrians frequenting to refuel. On 25 May 1950, a Qantas Catalina left Rose Bay for the Cocos (Keeling) Islands, carrying a survey team comprising members of the Department of Civil Aviation, RAAF, Qantas, and a hydrographer from the Royal Australian Navy. By then, the steel-plated runways had corroded, although samples concluded that locally sourced crushed coral can be used to construct a runway. In August 1951, a ship was chartered to carry a party of the 2nd Airfield Construction Squadron and 4,000 tons of heavy works equipment.

=== Civil operations ===
In March 1952, construction commenced for a 10,000 feet long and 150 feet wide runway. Up to 570 personnel from the 2nd Airfield Construction Squadron were deployed to facilitate this, using the recommended crushed coral for the runway. On 2 July 1952, construction works were completed, with both ends of the runway sealed and a capability of handling Lockheed Constellation aircraft. In September 1952, Qantas began a service between Australia and South Africa.

South African Airways aircraft operated between Johannesburg and Perth refuelled at this airport en-route before 1970.

The 2016 Australian Defence White Paper stated that the airfield would be upgraded to support the RAAF's P-8 Poseidon maritime patrol aircraft. Work was scheduled to begin in early 2023 and completed by 2026, though the costs of the upgrade had increased significantly. It is planned that the airfield will act as a forward operating base for Australian surveillance and electronic warfare aircraft in the region.

== Facilities ==
The airport has one runway, designated 15/33, with an asphalt surface measuring 2,441 m × 45 m (8,009 ft × 148 ft) and an elevation of 10 ft (3 m) above sea level.

== Airlines and destinations ==
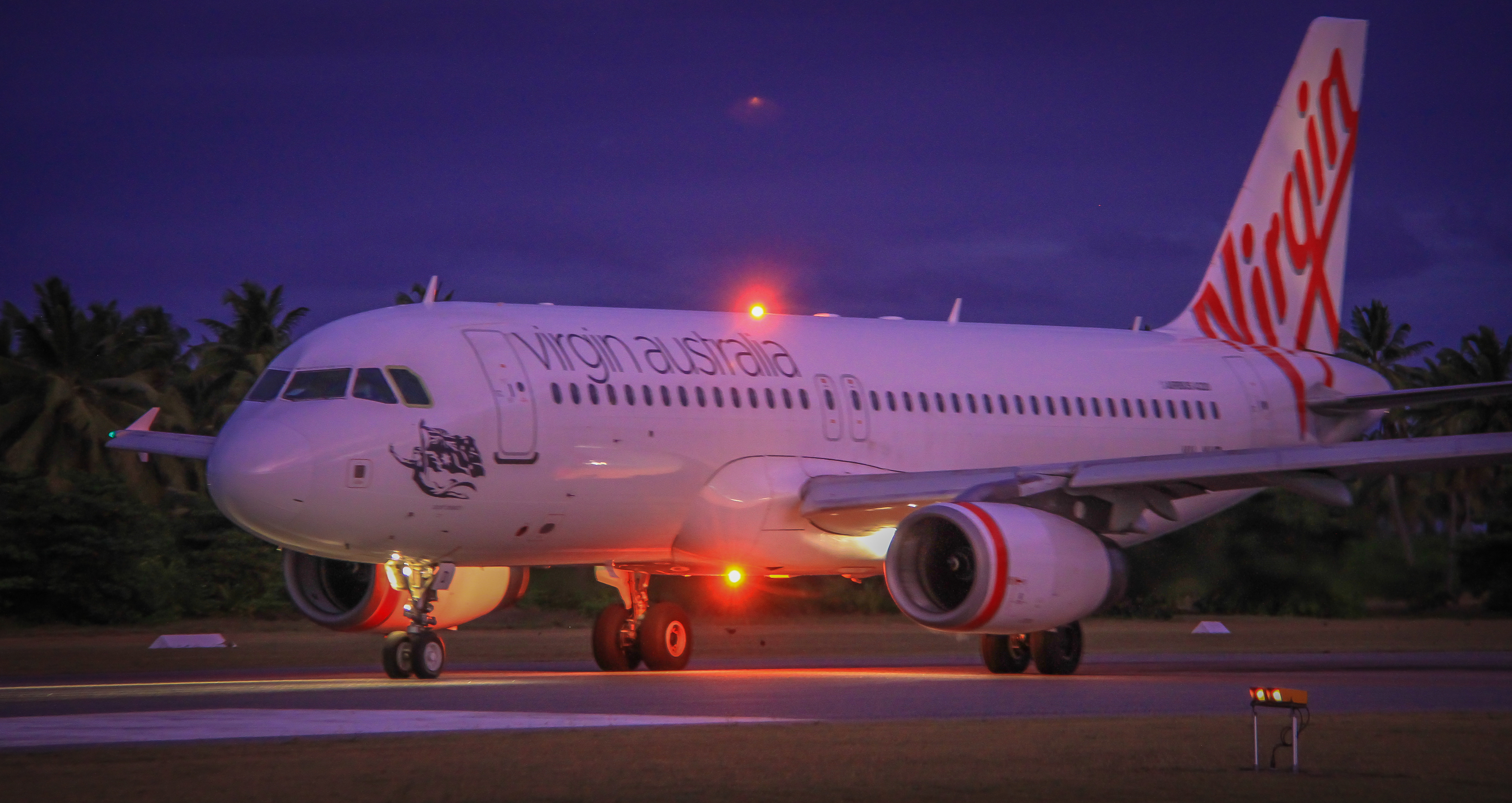
Virgin Australia Regional Airlines Airbus A320 taxiing at Cocos (Keeling) Islands Airport (2017)

Airlines	Destinations
QantasLink	Christmas Island, Perth

== Statistics ==
Cocos Island Airport served 14,896 revenue passengers during financial year 2017–2018.

Annual passenger and aircraft statistics for Cocos Island Airport
Year	Revenue passengers	Aircraft movements
2001–02	4,740	218
2002–03	4,328	212
2003–04	4,976	218
2004–05	5,631	226
2005–06	5,632	224
2006–07	6,501	232
2007–08	6,510	320
2008–09	5,611	238
2009–10	9,129	302
2010–11	15,712	303
2011–12	7,957	277
2012–13	14,478	454
2013–14	8,664	398
2014–15	11,323	360
2015–16	17,659	308
2016–17	16,387	345
2017–18	14,896	260

== See also ==
- List of airports in territories of Australia
- Aviation transport in Australia
