= Christmas Island Resort =

Resort on Christmas Island

Coordinates: 10°27′26″S 105°42′18″E

- Location: Christmas Island
- Owner: Australian Government

The Christmas Island Resort, often called the Christmas Island Casino, was a holiday resort on Christmas Island, an Australian territory in the north-eastern Indian Ocean about 380 kilometres (240 mi) south of Java and 1,600 kilometres (990 mi) north-west of the Australian mainland. The resort, including an integrated casino, opened in late 1993. The casino was generally profitable, with gross profits from casino operations peaking at $153.7 million in 1994–95. Overall, however, the casino and resort struggled financially and, after being badly affected by the 1997 Asian financial crisis, it was closed on 23 April 1998.

The closure of the resort and casino in 1998 had a devastating impact on Christmas Island's economy. Approximately 200-250 employees left the island after its closure, and between 1998 and 2001, the population of Christmas Island was estimated to have halved from approximately 2600 to 1300 people.

== History ==
The casino/resort was conceived in the early 1980s by Perth property developer Frank Woodmore as a business opportunity following the closure in 1981, for political and religious reasons, of Indonesia's three licensed casinos, all of which were in Jakarta. With Jakarta less than an hour's flight from Christmas Island, the casino was intended to attract high rollers from Indonesia and other Asian countries.

In 1985 a company, Christmas Island Resort Pty Ltd (CIR) was incorporated, with Woodmore, through Mercator Property Consultants Pty Ltd, initially holding 10% of the share capital, with other interests, principally controlled by Indonesian businessman Robby Sumampow, acquiring the remainder. Construction of the resort began late in the 1980s. On 5 November 1993 CIR was granted an Australian casino licence, with the building complex formally opened as the Christmas Island Casino and Resort on 18 December 1993.

As envisaged, the casino catered mainly to a wealthy Asian clientele, with most of its patrons flying in from Jakarta, often by private jet. Business was facilitated by the Australian government, which issued special short-term visas for Christmas Island. Initially, in the financial year ended 30 June 1994, the casino and resort operated profitably, with the majority of revenue coming from the casino. However, other than in financial year 1994, CIR made losses in every year that it was open. The resort was badly affected by the 1997 Asian financial crisis, and it suspended operations on 23 April 1998. On 28 July 1998 the Australian Minister for Regional Development, Territories and Local Government cancelled CIR's casino licence and, the following day, the company went into receivership. In 2000, the resort was purchased from the liquidators by David Kwon, a Sydney-based businessman.

In 2002, allegations were raised in the investigative journalism programme Four Corners relating to money laundering having occurred at the Christmas Island Casino during its years of operation. Also in 2002, the Australian government leased one of the resort's kitchens to provide meals for asylum seekers detained on Christmas Island.

In July 2004, a proposal by KFL Star Resort (a consortium of South Korean investors registered in Perth) to reopen the casino, was rejected by the Australian Government, with the Minister for Local Government, Territories and Roads, Senator Ian Campbell, quoted as saying that in the "interests of the Christmas Island community, the Australian Government has decided to make legislative changes to prohibit casino operations". In July 2009, it was reported that the Australian Federal Government was negotiating with Kwon about using the resort facilities to relieve overcrowding at the island's Immigration Detention Centre because of increases in boatloads of asylum seekers attempting to reach Australia. In response, the island's Shire President, Gordon Thomson, said that the Australian government should take control of the then mothballed resort and hand it over to the Christmas Island community to operate as a tourist resort. From time to time, the resort has been used as accommodation for Australian government staff and contractors working at the Christmas Island detention centre.

Despite support from Australian federal parliamentary reports for a casino licence being reissued, successive governments have declined to do so, most recently in 2021.

6 May 2025 the Australian government put out an approach to market

This Approach to Market (ATM) is for the provision of: Department of Infrastructure, Transport, Regional Development, Communications and Arts (the department) requires the services of a suitable property management agency with the qualifications skillset to inspect the Christmas Island Resort site, and list the site for leasing. As approved by the department, the Contractor will need to undertake: undertake an inspection of the site; develop appropriate promotional materials and actively promote the site; run an Expression of Interest (EOI); detail findings to the department; communicate with the identified proponents to submit the required documents; and assist the department in the negotiation and assessment of the proponent. On 15th October the Administrator announced Unlocking new potential for Christmas Island: Property Manager appointed for Former Resort Site The Australian Government has appointed Hotels and Hospitality Group (JLL) as property manager for the former Christmas Island Resort site, marking a significant step toward revitalising one of the island’s most iconic locations. Following a competitive, rigorous and transparent procurement process, Hotels and Hospitality Group was selected by the Department to showcase and list the 18-hectare beach-front site to new commercial enterprises, including international markets. The manager’s appointment reflects the government’s commitment to unlocking the site’s potential while ensuring responsible stewardship of the surrounding environment. The former resort site, directly managed by the Australian Government, offers a unique opportunity to raise global recognition of Christmas Island as a premier tourist destination. Future leasing of the site is expected to provide a significant boost to the local economy, supporting jobs, investment and long-term growth. Expressions of interest will be welcomed from ventures aligned with the island’s natural and cultural values, including short-stay accommodation, luxury adventure experiences, and eco-tourism. All future development will be subject to environmental regulation to support the protection of the adjacent marine park and surrounding ecosystems. Hotels and Hospitality Group will be visiting Christmas Island and inspecting the site from 21-24 October to commence this exciting process. We will keep the community updated as the expression of interest process is progressed.

== Description ==
The resort lies on a 47 ha block of land, a 99-year crown lease issued in 1989, at Waterfall Bay on the north-eastern coastal terraces of the island, not far from the airport. It contains 156 guest rooms and suites as well as other resort facilities such as restaurants, nightclubs and a swimming pool. When it operated as a casino the facilities included 43 slot machines and 23 gambling tables. CIR also owned the Christmas Island Lodge, containing 80 motel-style rooms, in Poon Saan as well as 144 apartments for staff accommodation.
