= No. 6 Operational Training Unit RAAF =

Royal Australian Air Force training unit

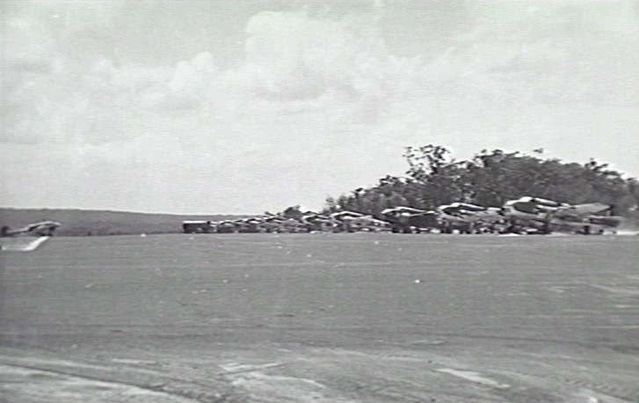
6OTU Beauforts at Jervis Bay Airport

No. 6 Operational Training Unit (6 OTU) was a Royal Australian Air Force training unit of World War II. 6 OTU was formed at RAAF Base Nowra on 5 June 1943 to provide DAP Beaufort aircrew with training in torpedo dropping procedures and tactics.

6 OTU was developed out of the Base Torpedo Unit (BTU), which was formed in 1942 to conduct torpedo training and torpedo development at Nowra. When the BTU was found to be incapable of carrying out all roles, 6 OTU was formed to provide all aircrew training in torpedo dropping while the BTU trained ground personnel in the handling of torpedoes. 6 OTU had a strength of some 275 aircrew (including those under instruction) and ground staff, with an aircraft strength of 22 Beauforts, two Airspeed Oxfords and two CAC Wacketts.

The CO was Wing Commander Owen Dibbs, who earlier played a prominent role in the training of aircrews in torpedo dropping with the BTU. Training was made as realistic as possible, and the converted ferry HMAS Burra-Bra was often used as a target ship. One of 6 OTU's instructors recalled: "The attacks were as spectacular as they were dangerous. We flew so low that the slipstreams threw up great rooster tails of water behind us." His role was to train aircrews to drop their torpedoes "in point-blank range of enemy gunners".

In late 1943, 6 OTU began moving from Nowra to a nearby airfield at Jervis Bay. By early 1944, however, it was apparent that torpedo use in operations was dropping away. 6 OTU returned to Nowra and was disbanded on 31 March 1944.
