= Canberra Airport =

Airport in Canberra, Australia

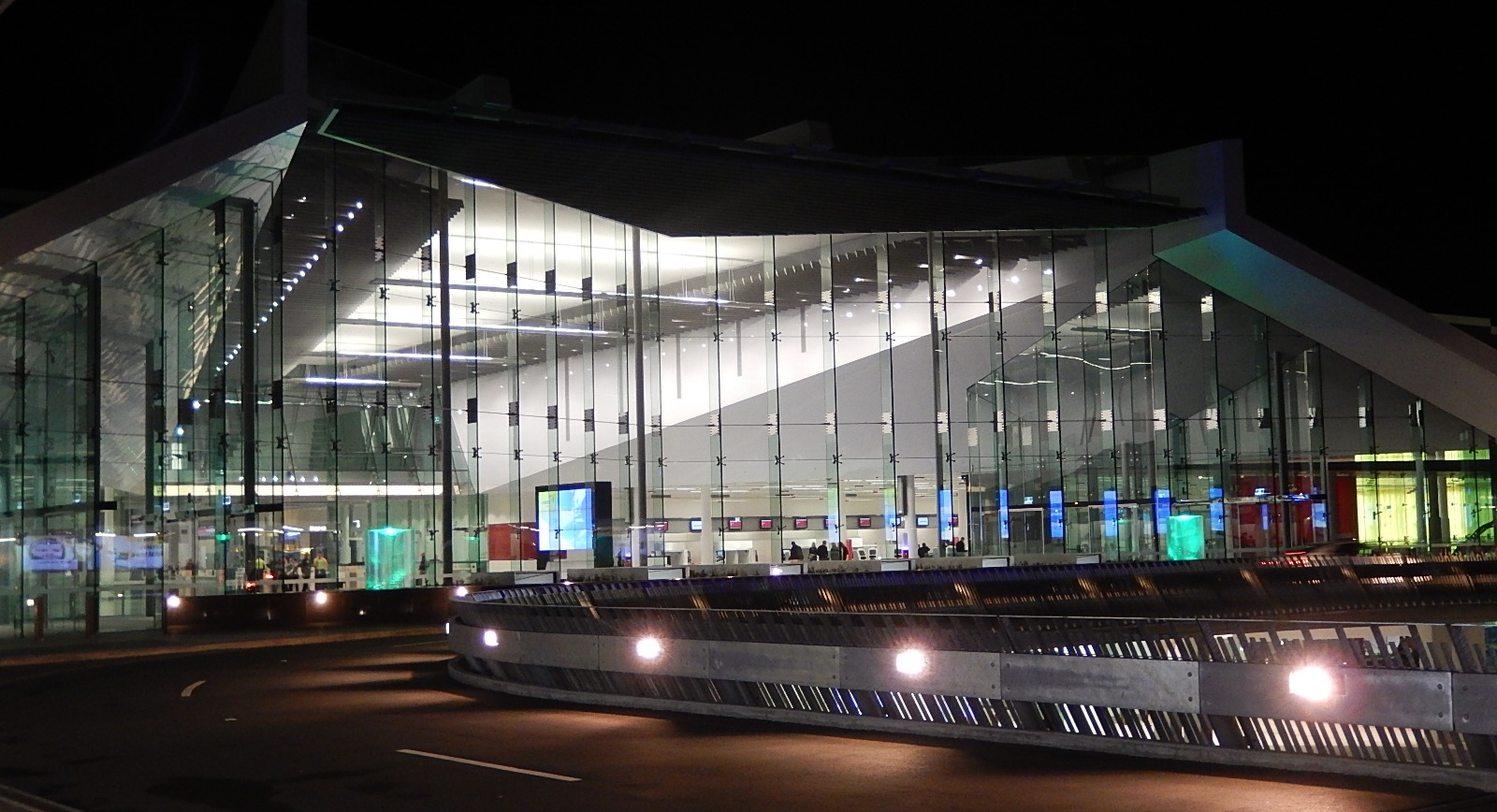
- IATA: CBR; ICAO: YSCB; WMO: 94926

Summary
- Airport type: Public
- Operator: Capital Airport Group Pty Ltd
- Serves: Canberra
- Location: Majura, Australian Capital Territory, Australia
- Focus city for: Qantas
- Elevation AMSL: 1,886 ft (575 m)
- Coordinates: 35°18′25″S 149°11′42″E
- Website: canberraairport.com.au

Map
- Interactive map of Canberra Airport

Runways
Direction	Length		Surface
Direction	m	ft	Surface
17/35	3,283	10,771	Asphalt
12/30	1,679	5,509	Asphalt

Statistics (2018/19)
- Passenger movements: ▲3,217,391
- Aircraft movements: ▲40,050
- Sources: Australian AIP and aerodrome chart Passenger and aircraft movements from the Bureau of Infrastructure & Transport Research Economics

Canberra Airport (IATA: CBR, ICAO: YSCB) is an international airport situated in the district of Majura, Australian Capital Territory. It serves Australia's capital city, Canberra, as well as the nearby city of Queanbeyan and regional southeastern New South Wales. Located approximately 8 km (5.0 mi) from the city centre, within the North Canberra district, it is the ninth-busiest airport in Australia.

The airport offers direct flights to all Australian state capitals alongside many regional centres across the Australian East coast, as well as international services to Nadi, Doha and Denpasar. Other international flights have, at various times, operated from Canberra to Singapore and Wellington.

Canberra Airport handled 3.2 million passengers in the 2018–19 financial year. Major redevelopment work completed in 2013 included the demolition of the old terminal, replacing it with a new facility designed to handle up to eight million passengers annually.

In addition to serving airline traffic, the airport is also the only public general aviation facility within the Australian Capital Territory. As a former Royal Australian Air Force base, Defence Establishment Fairbairn is located within Canberra Airport and supports government VIP flying operations by 34 Squadron as well as ground handling for itinerant military aircraft and visiting heads of state.

== Corporate management ==
The airport's controlling entity is Capital Property Finance Pty Ltd, the airport is managed and operated by the Canberra Airport Group Pty Ltd. The current CEO of the airport and property group is Terry Snow's step-son, Stephen Byron.

== History ==
=== Early years ===
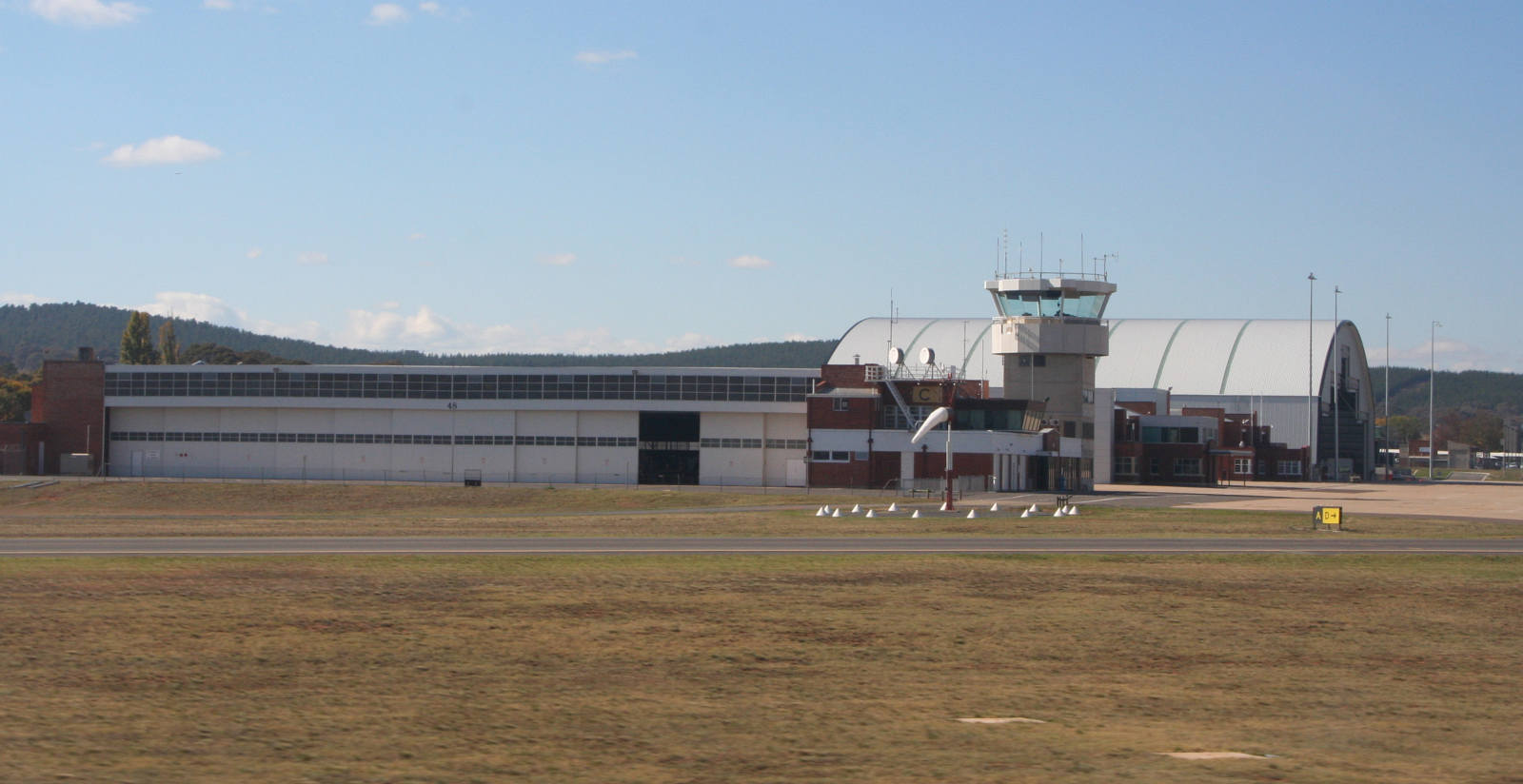
The hangars and air traffic control tower of Defence Establishment Fairbairn, viewed from the main runway

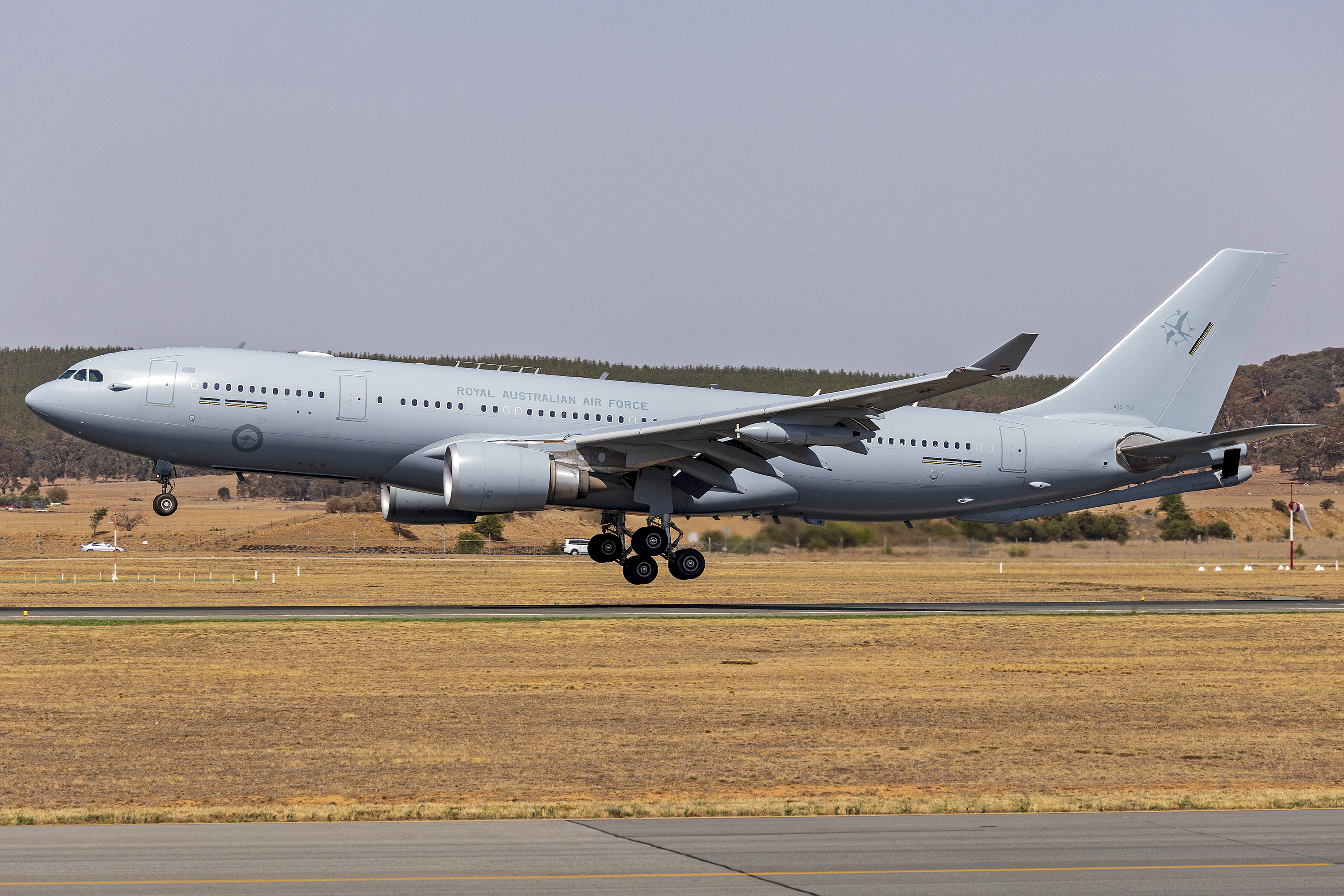
Royal Australian Air Force Airbus A330 MRTT in January 2020

The airport was built up from an old airstrip that was first laid down in the 1920s, not long after the National Capital site was decided. In 1939 it was taken over by the Royal Australian Air Force (RAAF), with an area leased out for civil aviation.

On 13 August 1940, in what became known as the Canberra air disaster, a RAAF Lockheed Hudson flying from Melbourne crashed into a small hill to the east of the airport. Four crew and six passengers, including the Chief of the General staff and three Federal Government ministers, were killed in the accident. James Fairbairn, Minister for Air and Civil Aviation, was one of those killed and Fairbairn Airbase, the eastern component of the airport, was subsequently named after him. In 1962 the military side of the airport was renamed RAAF Base Fairbairn. The north-east quadrant of the airport still retains the Fairbairn name.

The terminal facilities on the western side were upgraded in 1988. By 1994, Canberra Airport was the seventh busiest in Australia, handling 1.4 million passengers annually. Prior to privatisation, the Government of the Australian Capital Territory recommended further development of the airport as an international gateway, capable of limited widebody operations to destinations in South-East Asia and the Pacific region, but noted there was little appetite from Australian airlines to establish such services In May 1997, Canberra handled its first international flight when a charter for the ACT Brumbies to New Zealand was operated by a Qantas Boeing 737 with temporary immigration facilities set up.

The Australian Government then leased the airport to Canberra International Airport Pty Ltd in May 1998 for 99 years, and the RAAF area was sub-leased back to the Department of Defence. It was decommissioned as a RAAF base in 2003, (although No. 34 Squadron RAAF remains based there), and the RAAF area was renamed Defence Establishment Fairbairn.

In July 2004, Air Pacific launched twice weekly services between Canberra and Nadi, the first direct scheduled International link; however, these flights proved unsuccessful, prompting further investment in facilities to support international operations. In 2006 the main runway was upgraded to cater for heavier aircraft, allowing visiting dignitaries and heads of state to fly direct to the capital.

The airport's 2005 masterplan was criticised by the Federal government for not providing enough detail about planned expansion, while a further draft master plan was rejected by Federal Transport Minister Anthony Albanese in November 2008. The draft did not provide enough detail on a proposal to develop the airport into a freight hub, while that the airport's community consultation had also been insufficient. In the second half of 2008, Canberra International Airport Pty Ltd started referring to itself as "Canberra Airport".

=== Redevelopment and international flights ===
In early December 2007, plans were announced to construct a new terminal, to be completed by September 2010. This new terminal would have increased the number of aerobridges from two to six, doubled the number of check in counters and car parking and provided additional baggage processing capacity and lounge space. These plans were delayed due to the 2008 financial crisis.

With financial outlooks improving, in April 2009, the airport announced that $350 million would be spent towards a new terminal and key infrastructure projects, including:

- three new jet aircraft parking positions and a total of ten aerobridges
- an increase in check-in counters from 17 to 44
- two multi-story car parks connected to the terminal
- a split-level roadside drop off and pick up system
- dedicated customs, immigration and quarantine facilities to support International flights
- an indoor taxi rank and waiting area – a first for an Australian airport

The terminal's Southern concourse was completed in late 2010, while the Western concourse was partially open in March 2013 and complete by November of that year. Overall, floor space was increased by 65%, with significantly expanded baggage capacity and also expanded the airline lounges by four times compared to the previous building.

In November 2012, a national petition was started by 10-year-old Eve Cogan to name the new extensions after David Warren, inventor of the blackbox. The petition was supported by Sully Sullenberger.

In 2010, 8 Brindabella Circuit, a building located in the administration area of the Airport precinct, won the 5 Green Stars Australian Excellence Award.

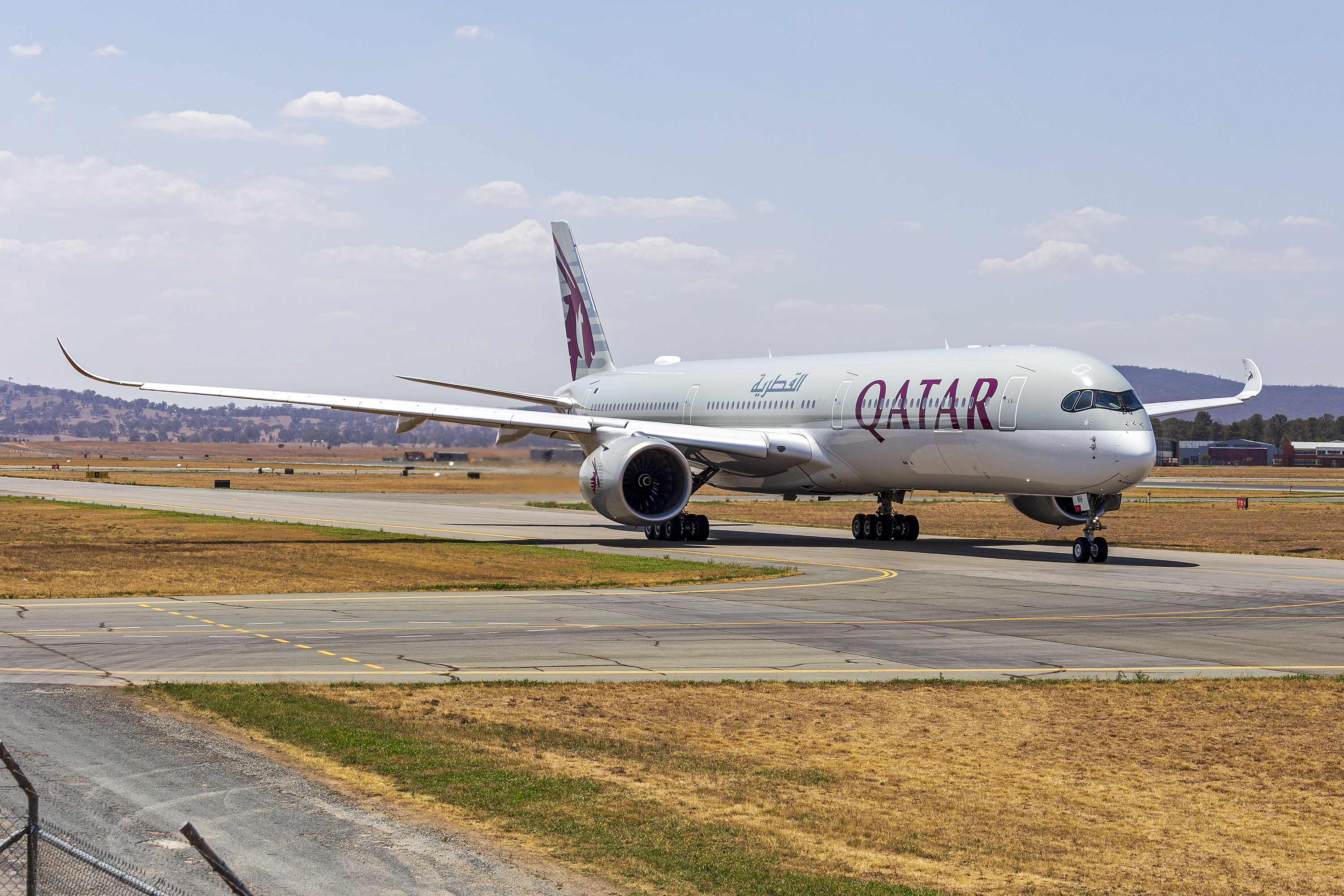
Qatar Airways Airbus A350 in January 2020

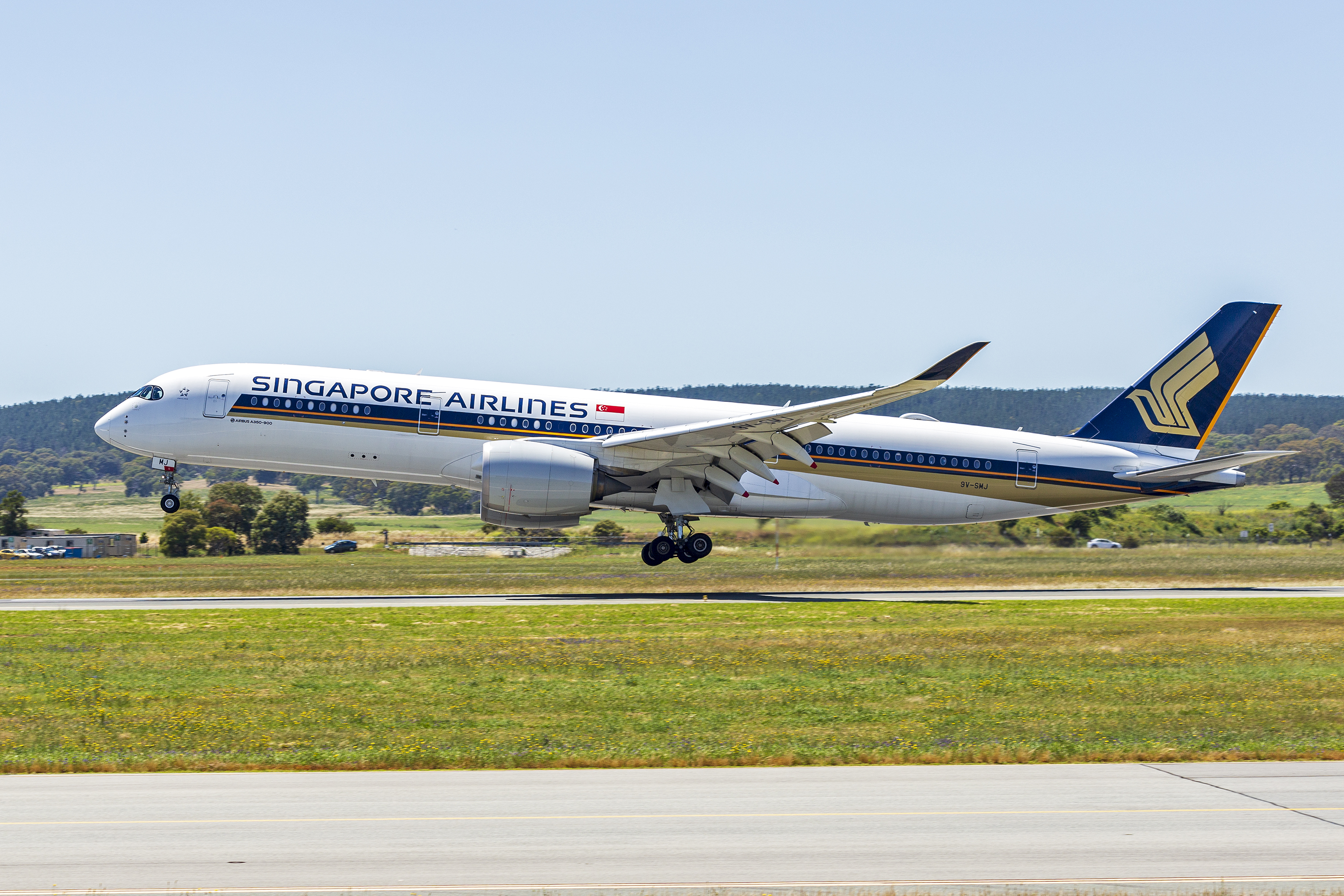
Singapore Airlines Airbus A350 in November 2020

In January 2016, Singapore Airlines announced it would launch flights from Singapore to Wellington via Canberra with Boeing 777-200ER aircraft, dubbed the "Capital Express" service. The ACT Government and Canberra Airport had been attempting for years to attract foreign airlines, or persuade Qantas or Virgin Australia to commence international flights from Canberra, with a population catchment of 900,000. The airport is underserviced compared to Adelaide which has 42 weekly international services with a population catchment only 25% larger. Canberra's status as Australia's capital city and the above average income of residents in the surrounding area provide arguments in favour of more international services at the airport. Qatar Airways began daily flights between Canberra and Doha, via Sydney, in February 2018. The product offering was upgraded in November 2019, replacing the Boeing 777-300ER aircraft used on the route with new Airbus A350-1000s

On 24 January 2018, Singapore Airlines announced that it was ending its Canberra to Wellington service on 30 April 2018, altering its Canberra operations to a daily Singapore-Sydney-Canberra-Singapore service from 1 May 2018 using the Boeing 777-300ER aircraft.

=== COVID-19 pandemic ===
Interstate travel restrictions as a result of the COVID-19 pandemic dramatically impacted operations at Canberra Airport. By August 2020, the airport reported a 99% reduction in passengers and closed the terminal on Saturdays as a cost saving measure, while management criticised State governments for enforcing border closures with the ACT, despite there being no active community transmission of the virus in the Territory. In September, Singapore Airlines announced the permanent suspension of its Canberra operations. Easing of travel restrictions in late September saw resumption and increased frequency on some interstate routes, avoiding further reduction to five days per week operations. This increased demand was followed by the announcement of several new leisure focussed, regional routes.

Canberra Airport received three one-off repatriation flights to bring home Australians stranded overseas, including a Qantas flight from New Delhi, a Nepal Airlines flight piloted by film star Vijaya Lama and a Singapore Airlines flight with 150 passengers.

On 17 July 2020, Qantas carried passengers on a scenic flight aboard its final Boeing 747 from Canberra Airport over the capital and surrounding region. The special flight, touted as a public farewell for the 747 long-haul fleet, had originally been planned over Melbourne, but it was changed to Canberra due to Victorian lockdowns. The aircraft performed low fly-pasts of the airport and the city landmarks.

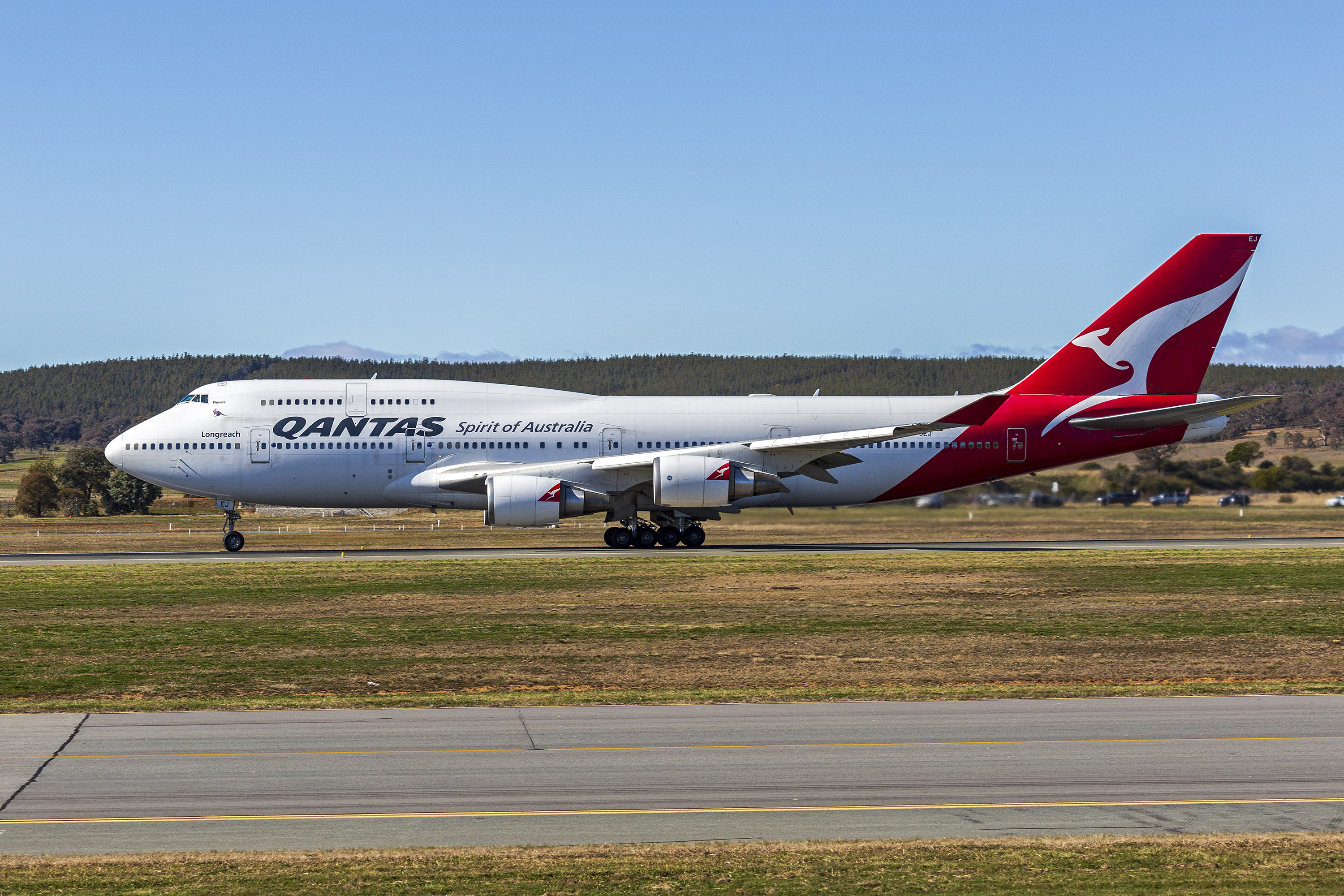
Qantas Boeing 747-400 in July 2020

Singapore Airlines and Qatar Airways cancelled their flights to Canberra in 2020 due to the pandemic. As of January 2023, Qatar had postponed the resumption of these flights on several occasions and there was no date for them to return. Singapore Airlines had also not announced a date by which it would resume servicing Canberra. The airport and ACT government have sought to attract flights to New Zealand without success.

=== Post pandemic recovery ===
In April 2023, Fiji Airways announced it would resume flights between Canberra and Nadi beginning July 2023, marking the return to international flights to Canberra. This was followed up with flights to Bali with Batik Air, which launched in June 2024 but were suspended until further notice in October 2024. Fiji Airways will also terminate its flights to Canberra from 5 February 2027.

In May 2024, the airport unveiled their five-year Route Development Plan, outlining a desire to resume services to Doha, Singapore and New Zealand, as well as to serve new destinations in China and Vietnam. Qatar Airways announced it will recommence its daily flights to Doha via Melbourne in December 2026.

== Facilities ==
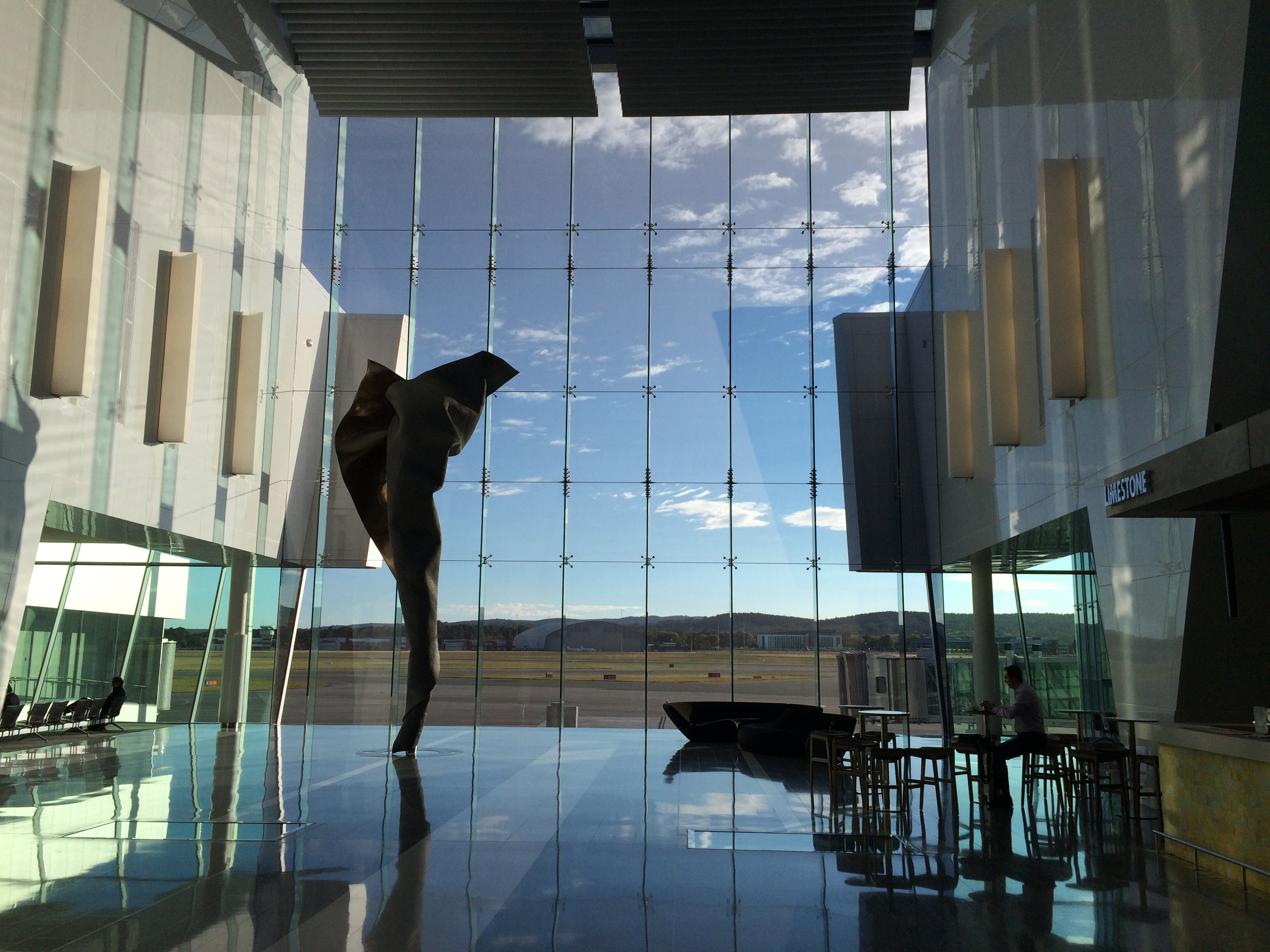
Atrium

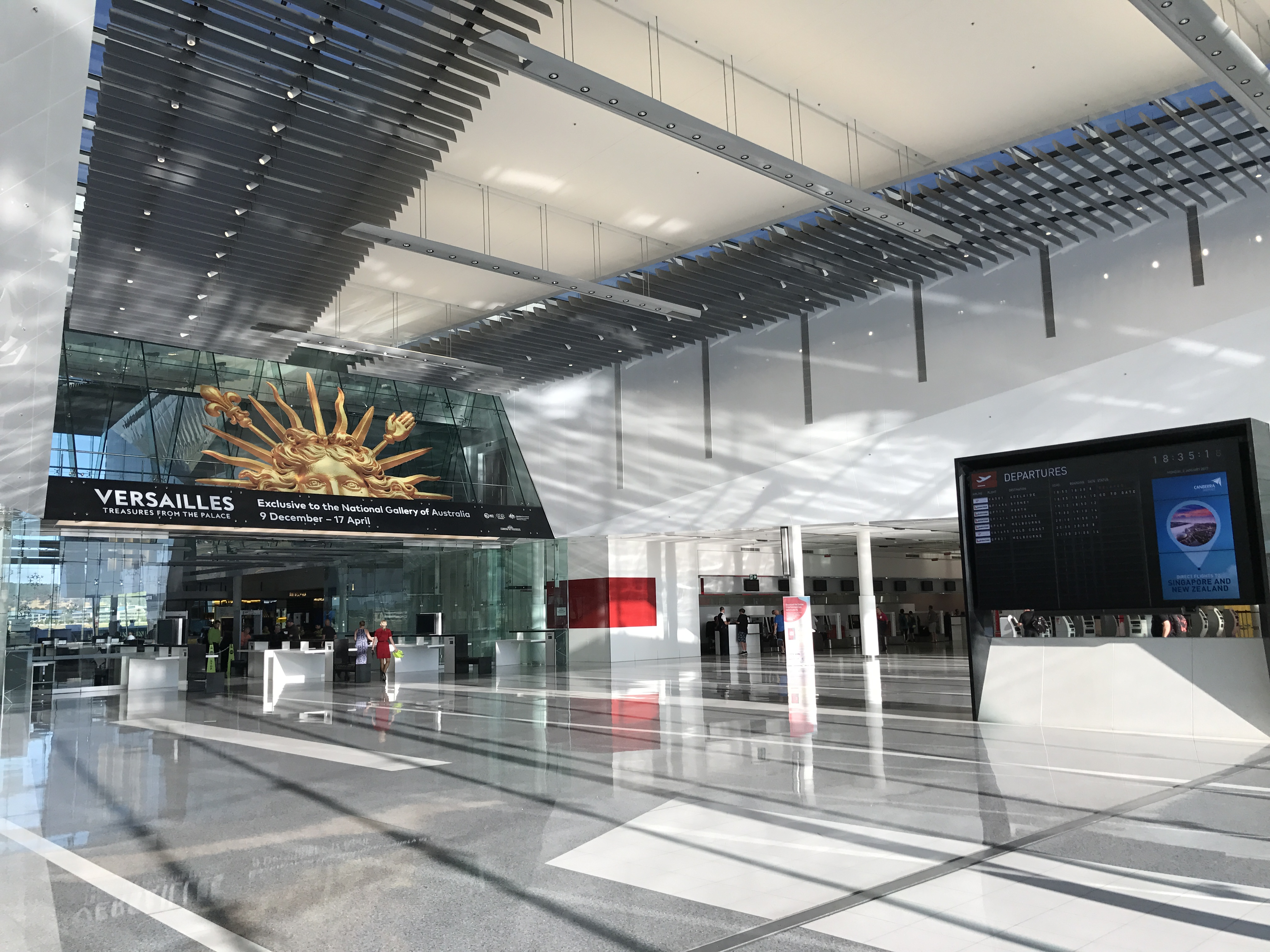
Security screening

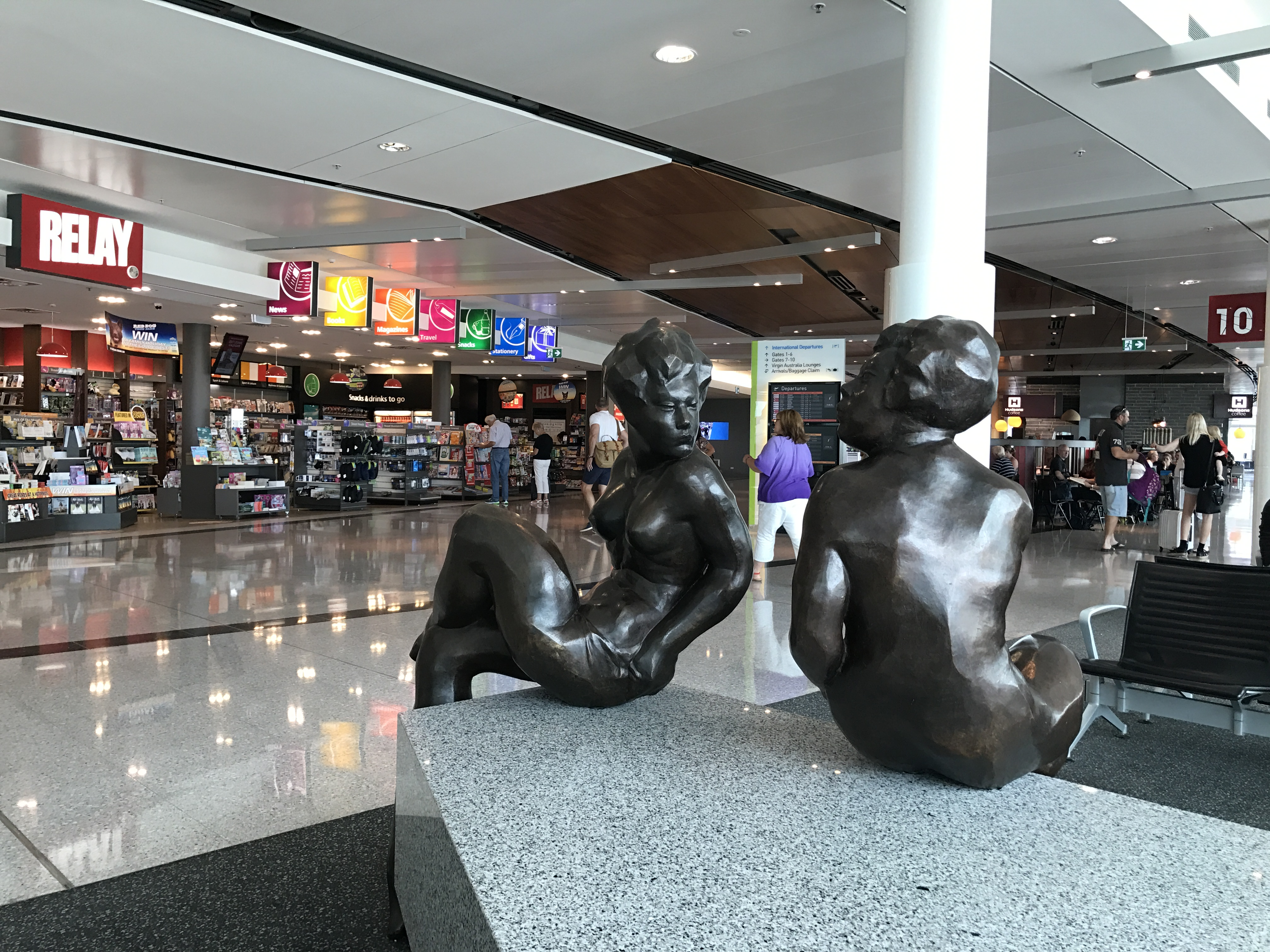
Southern Concourse

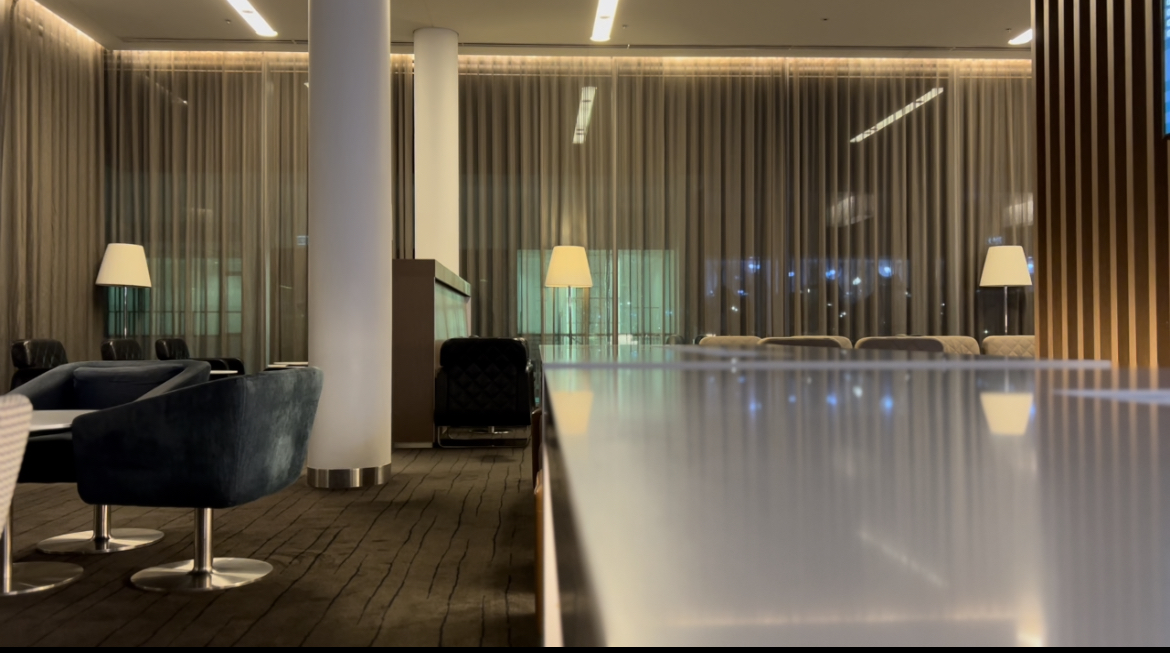
Qantas Domestic Business Lounge

The Canberra Spatial Plan released by the ACT Government in March 2004 identified the airport and surrounding areas as being an important centre for future industrial and related development. The airport precinct is currently divided into four areas, catering to aviation and non-aviation activities:

- The passenger terminal and general aviation facilities are in the south western quadrant formed by runways 17/35 and 12/30. This area also contains long and short term parking and a four-star hotel.
- The Brindabella Business Park is south of the passenger terminal. A heavy maintenance facility for QantasLink Boeing 717 aircraft is located adjacent to the business park.
- Fairbairn, a former RAAF base is on the eastern side of the main runway. In addition to military and VIP aircraft operations, this area contains the Air Traffic Control tower, aircraft rescue and firefighting (ARFF) facilities and remote parking for visiting heavy aircraft and diverted passenger flights.
- A retail and mixed use area north of runway 12/30, on Majura Road which has been named Majura Park. Tenants include Majura Park Shopping Centre, Costco, IKEA, and some office buildings.

=== Passenger terminals ===
Before the airport's redevelopment in 2009, there was a single building made up of two terminals. The former Qantas Terminal was located on the western side of the building. All Qantas and QantasLink flights and related services, such as lounges, now operate from the new Southern Concourse Terminal. The old terminal was demolished in 2011 to make way for the second Western Concourse Terminal.

The former Common User Terminal was located on the far eastern side of the building. The terminal served Virgin Australia and briefly Tigerair Australia. Also until 2001 the terminal was the home of Ansett Australia's operations from the airport. However, after the construction of the new Southern Concourse, only the terminal's departure lounge and gates 5 and 6 were in use. The Common User terminal was demolished in June 2013 after the opening of new Southern Concourse.

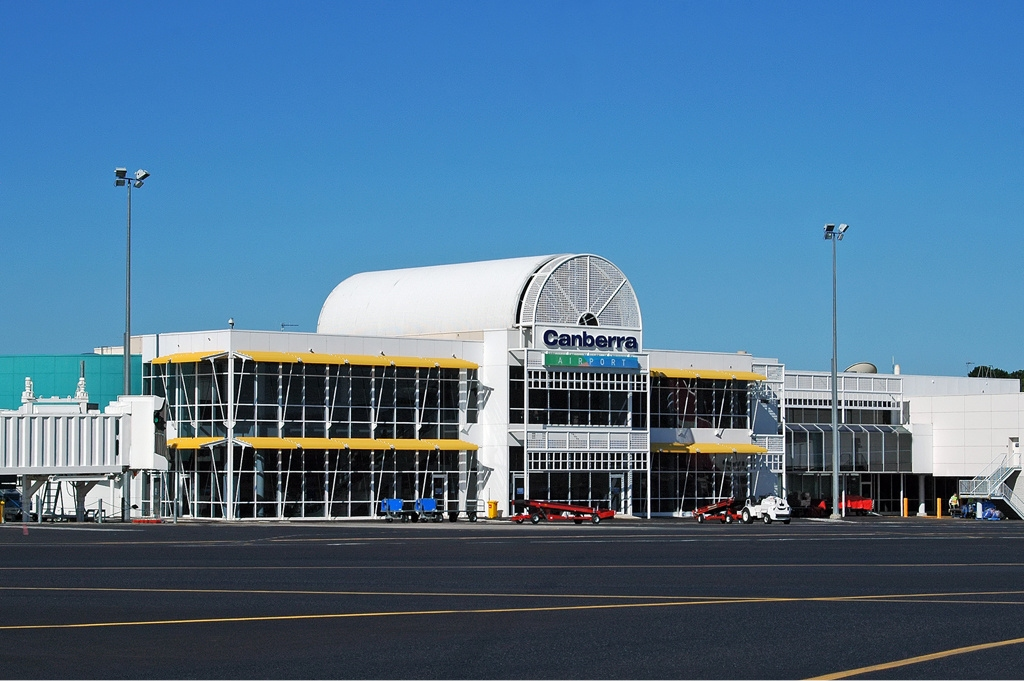
The now demolished old Canberra Airport terminal

==== Southern Concourse ====
Construction of the Southern Concourse was completed in late 2010 and came into service on 14 November. Qantas uses its check-in counters and departure gates. The Southern Concourse also includes The Qantas Club, The Qantas Business Class Lounge and The Qantas chairman's Lounge. The building's two wings, the Southern Concourse and the Western Concourse, are separated by an atrium, the centrepiece of the terminal.

==== Western Concourse ====
The Western Concourse opened in March 2013 and conjoins onto the Southern Concourse Terminal. Virgin Australia uses its check-in counters and departure gates. The Western Concourse also includes a 300-seat Virgin Lounge, and previously hosted the invite only “The Club” Lounge, also by Virgin.

The western concourse was built with space for customs, immigration and quarantine facilities next to the Virgin lounge on the upper floor and on the ground floor. These areas were fitted out and opened when Singapore Airlines began its Canberra services to Wellington and Singapore. International flights arrive at and depart from gate 5.

==== General Aviation Terminal ====
The General Aviation Terminal in Canberra Airport is a small separate building located on the far west side of the Terminal Precinct. Brindabella Airlines had its head office and maintenance facility located near this terminal prior to the airline's collapse in 2013.

== Airlines and destinations ==
View from airport apron

Airlines	Destinations
Fiji Airways	Nadi (ends 5 February 2027)
FlyPelican	Newcastle
Jetstar	Brisbane, Gold Coast, Melbourne
Link Airways	Hobart, Launceston, Newcastle; Seasonal: Coffs Harbour
Qantas	Perth
QantasLink	Adelaide, Brisbane, Melbourne, Sydney; Seasonal: Hobart
Qatar Airways	Doha (resumes 8 December 2026) (Note: Qatar Airways flights stop in Melbourne en route to their destination; however Qatar Airways has no traffic rights to carry passengers solely between Canberra and Melbourne.)
Virgin Australia	Adelaide, Brisbane, Gold Coast, Melbourne, Sydney; Seasonal: Denpasar

Qantas formerly operated dedicated 'flightseeing' services over Antarctica from Canberra. These flights, which used a Boeing 787 Dreamliner, departed Canberra from the international/domestic terminal, and provided a guided aerial tour of Antarctica before returning to Australia. These flights were about thirteen hours in total.

== Controversies ==
During the COVID-19 pandemic in Australia, Canberra Airport announced that runway 12/30 would be closed. As noted in the 2014 Canberra Airport Master plan, this runway is primarily used by general aviation and was considered by the Aircraft Owners and Pilots Association (AOPA) to be a thinly veiled attempt to unlock a larger area of the site for non-aviation purposes. There has also been a significant and ongoing criticism that the ongoing property development activities have been pursued to the detriment of aviation safety. For Canberra Airport, Airservices Australia has been obliged to put the following warning in its En Route Supplement Australia: "During strong westerly winds TURB may be experienced in touch down area LDG RWY 35." Pilots have been warned of potential safety issues arising from turbulence caused by mostly non-aviation related development encroaching close to the runway. This development restricts the options available to pilots of smaller aircraft in an emergency.

== Second airport ==
Canberra is the only capital city in Australia that does not have a secondary airport (with the exception of Darwin). In 1955, the Commonwealth Government recommended that a second airport be built to separate slower and smaller aircraft from much faster turboprop airliners as passenger traffic grew. In 2011, the ACT Government considered a proposal to develop a small airport on a site in Williamsdale, south of Canberra that would be support general aviation and emergency services users. The Government declined to proceed after conducting a cost–benefit analysis that anticipated marginal returns on the required investment, despite demand for a secondary airport. The Canberra Regional Aviators Association formed in 2009 to advocate for a second airport. The association has criticised rising costs following the privatisation of Canberra Airport, pointing out that since 1997, many flying schools and maintenance providers ceasing to operate and far fewer light aircraft are based at the airport. They argue that establishment of a secondary airport will boost the city's economy through the creation of maintenance and engineering jobs and provide facilities for Canberra's universities to expand flight training programs.

== Statistics ==
=== Total passengers and aircraft movements ===
Annual passenger statistics for Canberra Airport
Year	Domestic	International	Total	Change
1998	1,805,091	-	1,805,091	▲1.0%
1999	1,899,694	-	1,899,694	▲5.2%
2000	2,039,304	-	2,039,304	▲7.3%
2001	1,972,202	-	1,972,202	▼ –3.3%
2002	1,884,766	-	1,884,766	▼ –4.4%
2003	2,074,167	-	2,074,167	▲10.0%
2004	2,434,463	1,996	2,436,459	▲17.5%
2005	2,524,753	-	2,524,753	▲3.6%
2006	2,612,679	-	2,612,679	▲3.5%
2007	2,734,875	-	2,734,875	▲4.7%
2008	2,983,488	-	2,983,488	▲9.1%
2009	3,148,420	-	3,148,420	▲5.5%
2010	3,304,010	-	3,304,010	▲4.9%
2011	3,208,225	-	3,208,225	▼ -2.9%
2012	3,065,893	-	3,065,893	▼ –4.4%
2013	2,956,448	-	2,956,448	▼ –3.6%
2014	2,811,822	-	2,811,822	▼ –4.9%
2015	2,805,306	-	2,805,306	▼ –0.2%
2016	2,885,793	23,771	2,909,564	▲3.7%
2017	3,021,340	84,435	3,105,775	▲6.7%
2018	3,153,143	94,922	3,248,065	▲4.6%
2019	3,153,043	85,069	3,238,112	▼ –0.3%
2020	895,979	13,011	908,990	▼ –71.9%
2021	1,023,882	137	1,024,019	▲12.7%
2022	2,437,607	0	2,437,607	▲138.0%
2023	2,757,350	12,080	2,769,430	▲13.6%
2024	2,795,829	37,290	2,833,119	▲2.3%
2025	2,762,774	30,848	2,793,622	▼ -1.4%

=== Busiest domestic routes ===
Domestic aviation activity (year ending December 2025)
Rank	Airport	Passengers handled	% Change
1	Melbourne	979,100	▼ -3.0
2	Brisbane	651,900	▲2.1%
3	Sydney	610,700	▼ -4.5%
4	Adelaide	196,600	▲5.6%
5	Gold Coast	177,900	▼ -2.6%

=== Busiest international routes ===
Busiest international routes (year ending 31 December 2025)
Rank	Airport	Passengers handled	% change	Airlines
1	Nadi	30,246	▼1.5	Fiji Airways

== Advertising ==
While billboards have been barred in Canberra since the 1930s, an amendment of the National Capital Plan in 2000 allowed them to be displayed at Canberra Airport. Subsequently, the airport has hosted advertisements promoting defence hardware. A community group said the airport should not be promoting weapons manufacturers. The airport defended the ads and said the airport would continue to accept defence industry advertising. In 2015 the airport was lit up in rainbow colours, and in 2017 electronic and 3D message boards were used to support marriage equality. In August 2017 Canberra Airport awarded Qatar Media Services (QMS) the concession for all internal and external advertising. The first advertising project will be a double-sided "landmark digital billboard", being the only installation of this type in the ACT.

== Environment ==
Approach and departure corridors lie over largely rural and industrial areas, although the instrument approach path (from the south) passes near the New South Wales suburb of Jerrabomberra, the city of Queanbeyan, and the Royal Australian Navy base, HMAS Harman, which has some barracks and housing.

Proposals have been made to the NSW Planning Minister by various developers to approve housing estates that are under the southern flight paths in New South Wales. Canberra International Airport Pty Ltd has been vigorous in advertising its opposition to these plans on the basis of a general increase in noise levels over a wide corridor which is currently free of aircraft noise, and concern that this will lead to the imposition of a curfew on the hours-of-operation of the airport.

== Ground transport ==
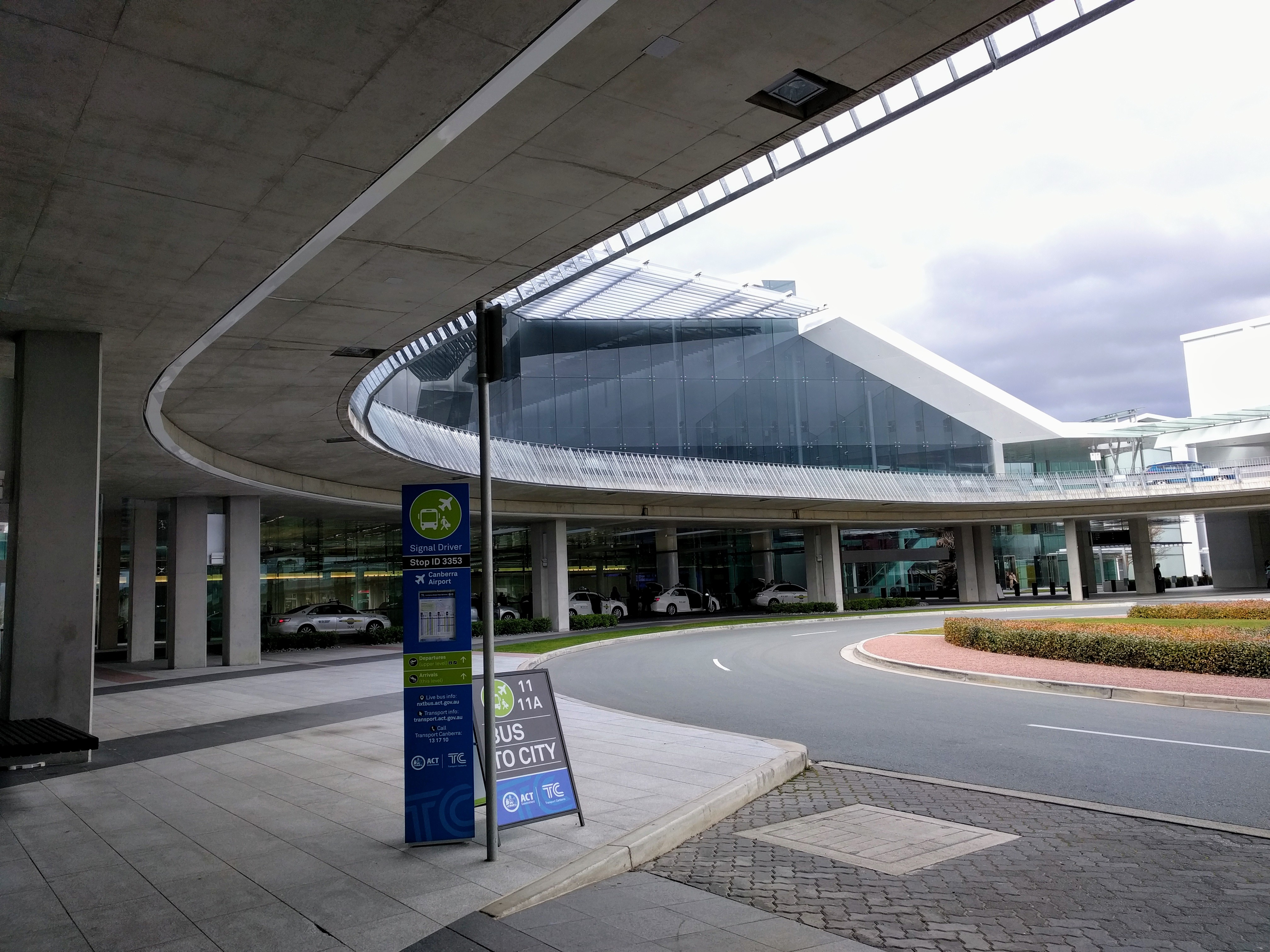
The ACTION bus stop at Canberra Airport

Access to the city from the airport is via Morshead Drive and Parkes Way and Pialligo Avenue to Queanbeyan. A major junction, which connects the Majura Parkway and Monaro Highway with Canberra's east-west arterial road network, is located adjacent to the airport. Travel time to Canberra from the airport is generally around 10 minutes. The road approaches to the airport and business parks have historically been prone to traffic congestion in peak times. In 2007, the Chief Minister, Jon Stanhope controversially attributed the congestion to the Federal Government permitting construction of office buildings on airport land. A report commissioned by the ACT Government, however, identified a range of factors contributing including population growth in Gungahlin and Queanbeyan and the expansion of the airport itself, calling for a staged approach to road improvements in the area. Major investment in upgrades aimed at improving access have progressively been completed since 2008 through joint funding from both Canberra Airport Group and the Government of the Australian Capital Territory.

Canberra Cabs and partner taxi companies provide services to the airport taxi rank. An enclosed waiting area was opened in November 2013, aiming to improve the experience for arriving passengers who would otherwise wait outside in Canberra's relative climate extremes. Hire car companies maintain a presence in the terminal and Uber pick-up and drop offs are permitted with a $3 fee charged to drivers.

ACTION commenced operating services to Canberra Airport's passenger terminal from the City Interchange with route 11 in 2017. Route 11 has since been replaced by route R3 to and from Spence. Canberra Airport Express provides daytime mini-bus services to Canberra City, connecting to regional and Interstate coach services at the West Row bus station. Other local bus services operate through the airport precinct and Brindabella Business park, but do not stop at the terminal including former ACTION route 792 (peak hours) to/from Woden and CDC Canberra route 834 to Queanbeyan (weekdays only).

On 10 February 2009, Canberra Airport released its preliminary draft master plan which announced that a high-speed rail link between Sydney, Canberra and Melbourne was being considered. The plan was shortlisted in December 2008 by Infrastructure Australia for further consideration; however, it was the most expensive project shortlisted, and has not attracted any funding from any government. The decision to build the Western Sydney Airport at Badgerys Creek has made a fast rail link to Canberra Airport unlikely in the foreseeable future.

== Accidents and incidents ==
- In October 2003, the runway was damaged by Air Force One, a Boeing VC-25, carrying President of the United States George Bush.
- On 12 August 2022, 63 year-old Ali Rachid Ammoun walked into the departures area at Canberra Airport, sat down and fired five rounds from a handgun into glass window panels. While nobody was hit by the gunshots, a number of people were injured during the panicked evacuation that immediately followed, many fearing a terrorist attack. Ammoun, who was on parole after serving a 14 year sentence for the attempted murder of his wife in Western Australia, surrendered to police and was taken into custody. The incident disrupted flights for several hours as the airport was shut down, with passengers not permitted to disembark from recently arrived flights. During his trial, Ammoun stated that he believed he had been wrongfully convicted and travelled to the capital to make a political statement to draw attention to this injustice. He said he deliberately fired only at the windows as he never intended to hurt anyone. After undergoing a psychological assessment, Ammoun was sentenced to three years in prison in March 2023.
- On 10 November 2022, a Link Airways Saab 340B, registered VH-VEQ operating on behalf of Virgin Australia as flight VA-633 from Canberra to Sydney made an emergency landing shortly after takeoff. A ratchet strap used to secure the left-hand propeller while the aircraft is on the ground was not removed by the crew before starting the engines. While accelerating on the runway, it penetrated the side of the fuselage into the passenger cabin as the aircraft became airborne. The aircraft landed safely seven minutes after departure and the airline reported no injuries to passengers. However, after landing the Australian Federal Police and Australian Transport Safety Bureau (ATSB) reported that between one and three passengers had sustained minor injuries. The ATSB classified the occurrence as a serious incident and opened an investigation, which subsequently confirmed one passenger was injured by debris that penetrated the cabin and identified four safety issues. These related to ground handling and flight preparation procedures by both Link Airways and contracted service provider Swissport.
- On 2 November 2023, a woman was arrested by Australian Federal Police after having opened a secured door, and walked onto the tarmac in an attempt to flag down a QantasLink flight that she had missed boarding for. Flights were delayed 10 minutes and resumed after.
