= Christmas Island Airport =

Airport on Christmas Island

Christmas Island International Airport

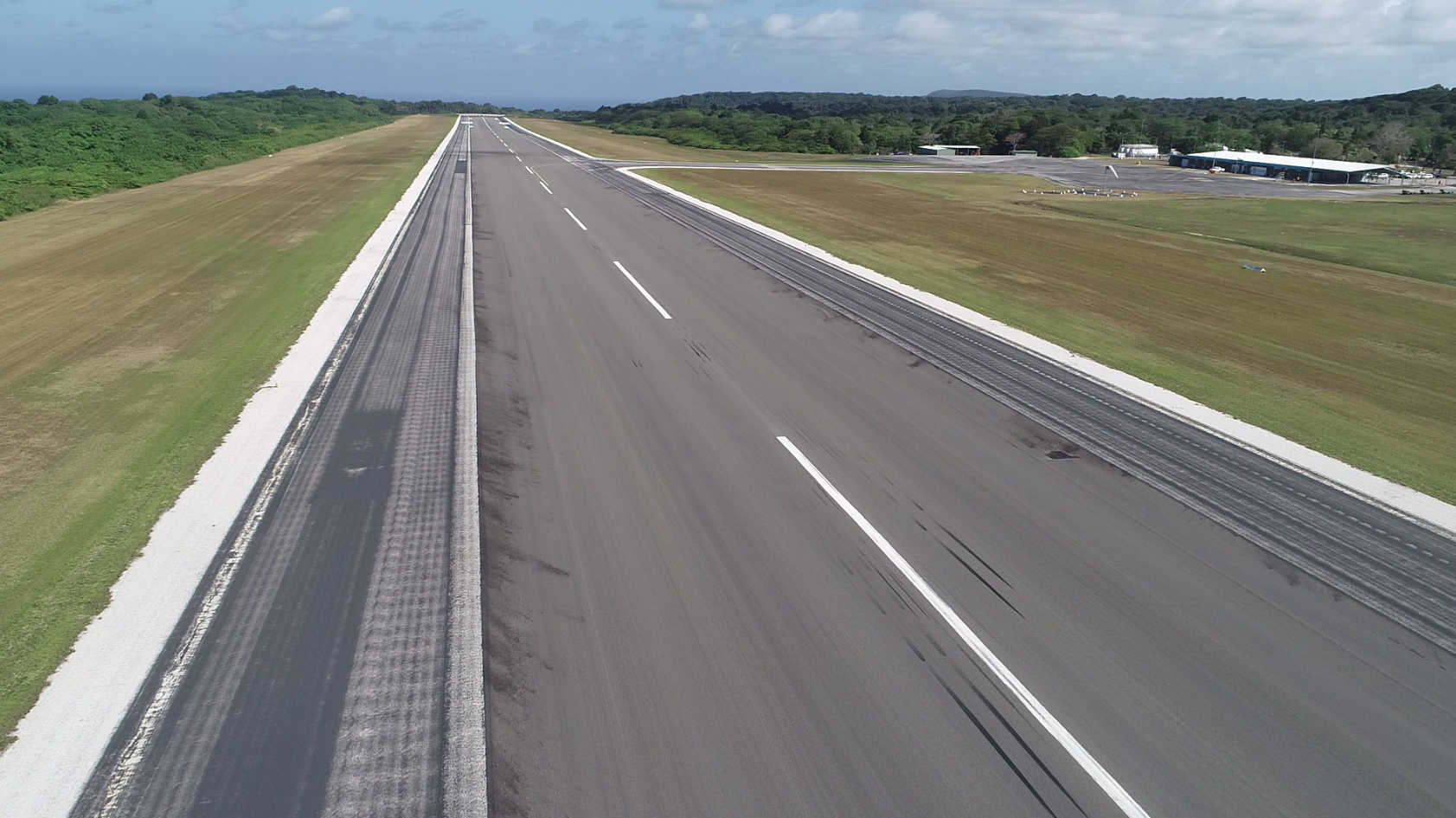
- IATA: XCH; ICAO: YPXM

Summary
- Airport type: Public
- Operator: Toll Remote Logistics
- Location: Christmas Island
- Elevation AMSL: 916 ft (279 m)
- Coordinates: 10°27′02″S 105°41′25″E
- Website: christmasislandairport.com.au

Maps
- Location within Christmas Island Location within Southeast Asia Location within Indian Ocean
- Interactive map of Christmas Island International Airport

Runways
Direction	Length		Surface
Direction	m	ft	Surface
18/36	2,103	6,900	Asphalt

Statistics (2017/18)
- Passenger movements: ▲26,731
- Aircraft movements: ▲347
- Sources: Australian AIP and aerodrome chart passenger and aircraft movements from the BITRE

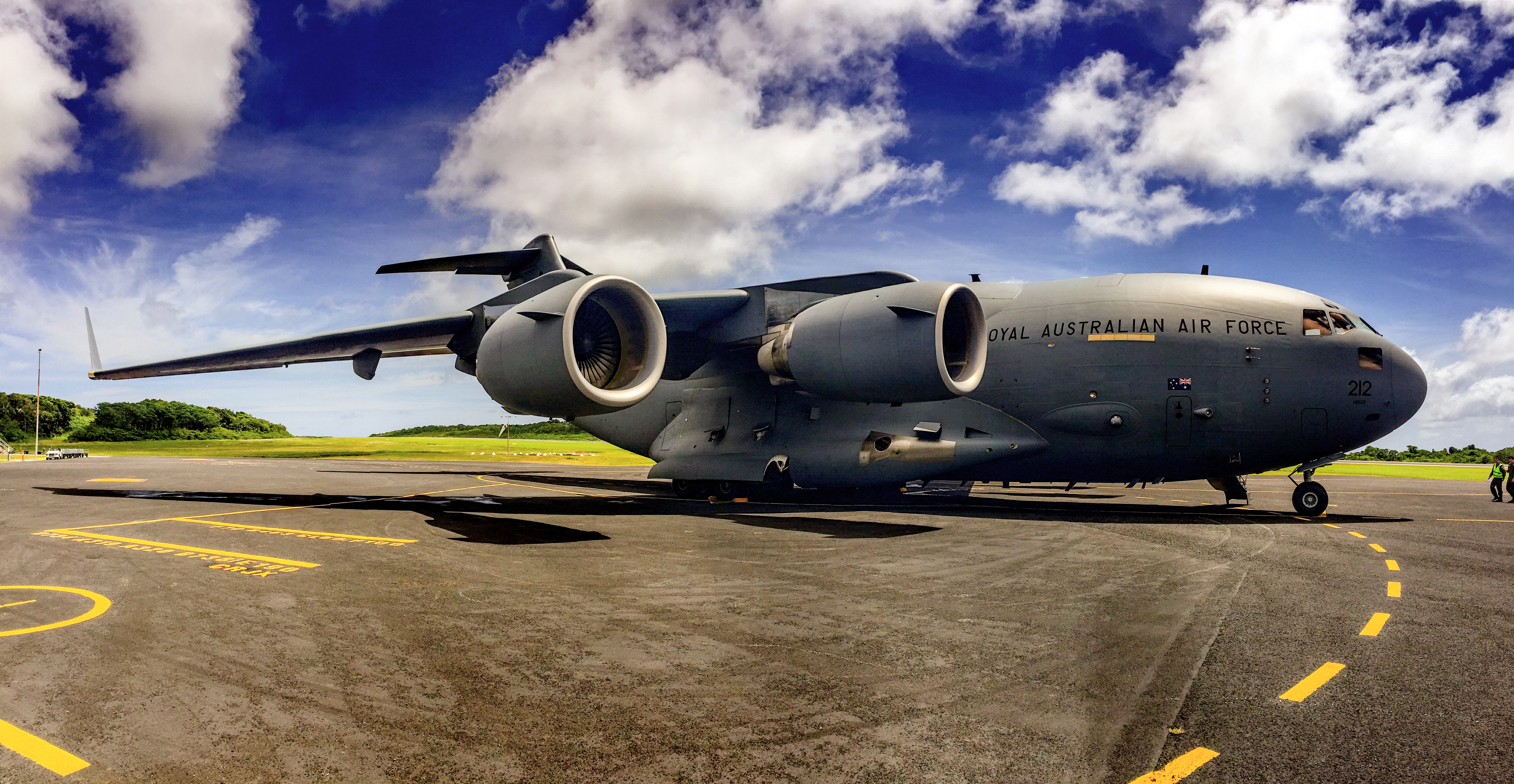
A Royal Australian Air Force Boeing C-17 Globemaster III (A41-212) awaiting cargo at Christmas Island Airport

Christmas Island International Airport (IATA: XCH, ICAO: YPXM) is an airport located on Christmas Island, a territory of Australia in the Indian Ocean. The island is located 2,600 kilometres (1,600 mi; 1,400 nmi) northwest of the Western Australian city of Perth, 500 km (310 mi; 270 nmi) south of the Indonesian capital, Jakarta, and 975 km (606 mi; 526 nmi) east-northeast of the Cocos (Keeling) Islands.

Located in an Australian territory, the airport is classified as a Category 2 international airport for all arrivals, including those from Australia. It is owned by the Commonwealth through the Department of Infrastructure and Regional Development and is operated under contract by Toll Remote Logistics.

== History ==
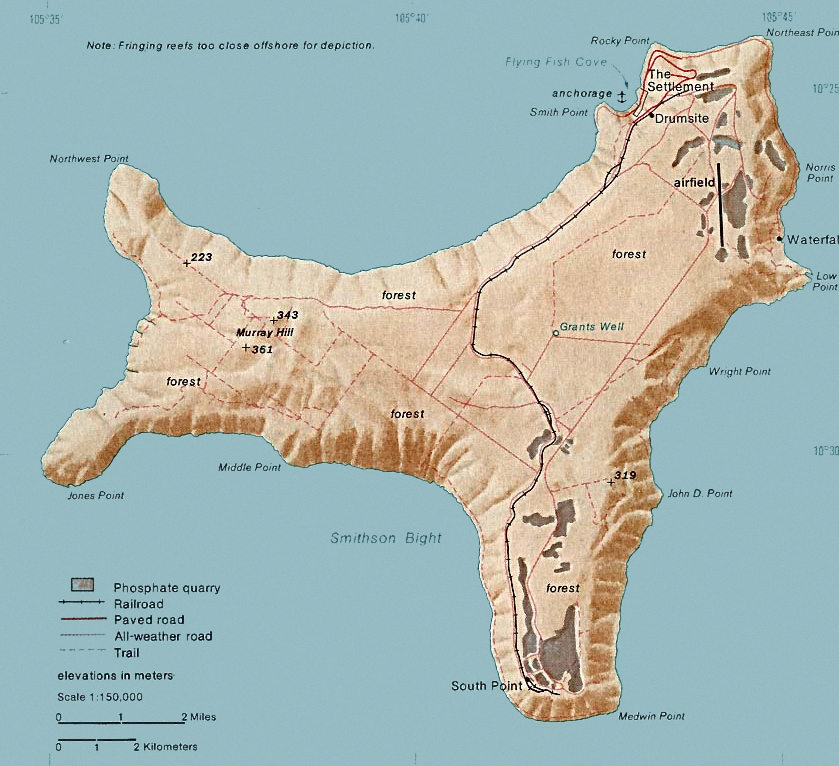
Map of Christmas Island showing location of airfield

From the late 1940s, when the island was still a British colony administered by Singapore and the Straits Settlements Administration, it was serviced occasionally by Royal Air Force (RAF) Short Sunderland flying boats before the construction of the airport in 1974. The First commercial jet service from Perth, a TAA Boeing 727, arrived on 6 June 1974. Under Australia’s two-airline policy, Ansett Airlines of Australia joined TAA on the route, providing the only direct air links with Australia. In 2024, Australia Post released a series of commemorative stamps to mark the 50th anniversary of the first flight.

=== Tampa affair ===
A brief revival of activity at the airport occurred in 2001 during the Tampa affair when the heightened Royal Australian Air Force (RAAF) traffic was complemented by a large number of Department of Immigration and Citizenship (DIAC) and media charters. During this incident, traffic at the airport is said to have been "near-continuous".

=== Satellite launch facility ===
After the closure of the casino, the resort was taken over by the Asia Pacific Space Centre, which developed plans for a satellite launch facility on Christmas Island. The company, with solid financial participation from the Australian Government, had planned to start satellite launches in 2004. Technical staff was to include 350–400 Russian rocket scientists and engineers, and componentry was to be flown in on Antonov An-124 and Boeing 747 freighters. To achieve this, the airport would need major extensions, and the Government allocated around A$55m to the task. This included a 600 m (1,969 ft) runway extension, plus additional taxiways, apron space, and other infrastructure.

== Facilities ==
=== Runway ===
The airport resides at an elevation of 916 ft (279 m) above sea level. It has one runway designated 18/36 with an asphalt surface measuring 2,103 m × 45 m (6,900 ft × 148 ft). and a 2.3% mid-runway gradient.

=== Terminal ===
As the Indian Ocean Territories Islands are duty-free, the airport terminal has a Duty-free shop and licensed kiosk. In 2018 the airport operator, Toll Remote Logistics, introduced complimentary public Wi-Fi. This was the first time Wi-Fi had been offered for free at the airport on an island that only has a 2G mobile network.

== Airlines and destinations ==
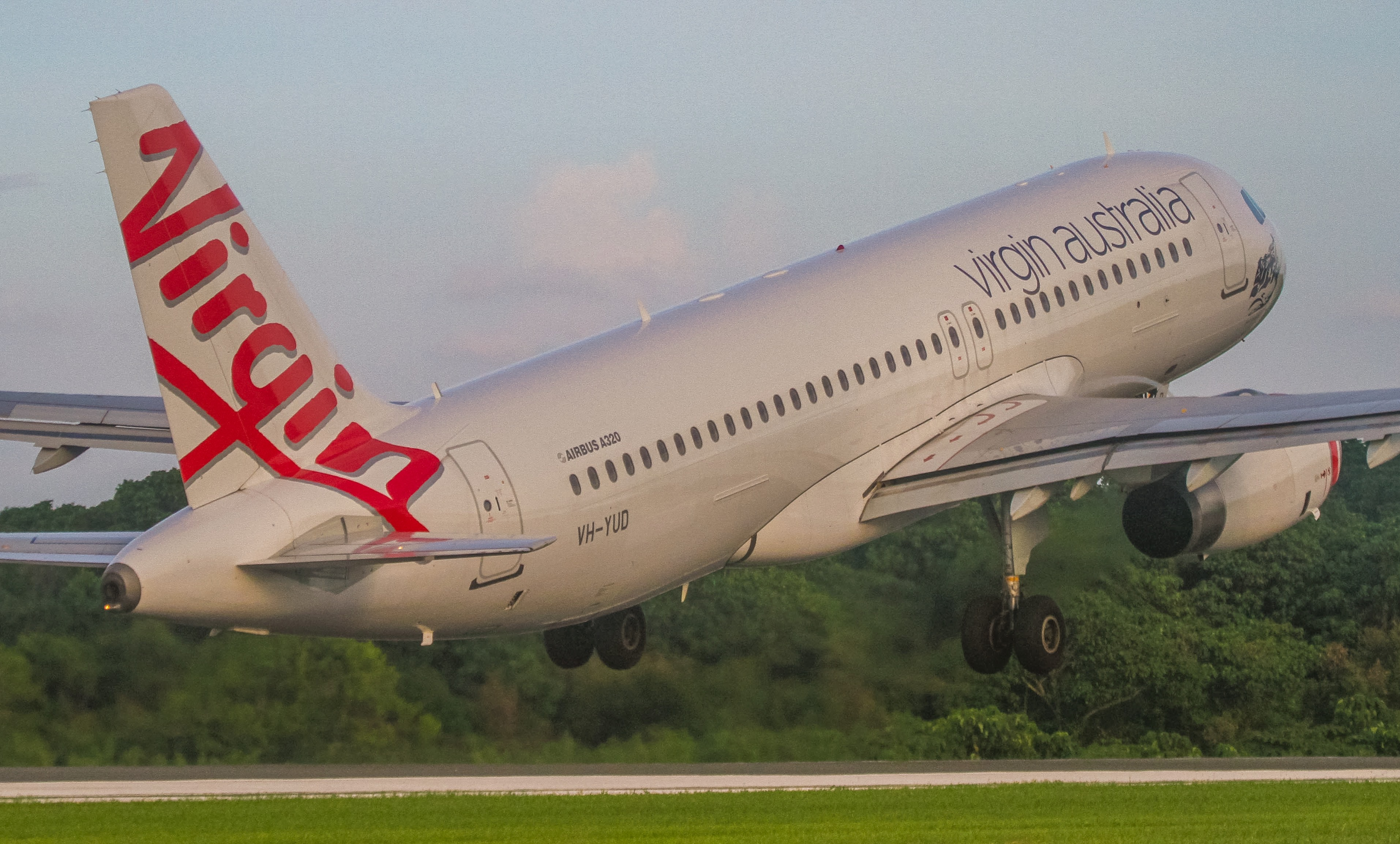
A Virgin Australia Regional Airlines Airbus A320 takes off at Christmas Island Airport (2016)

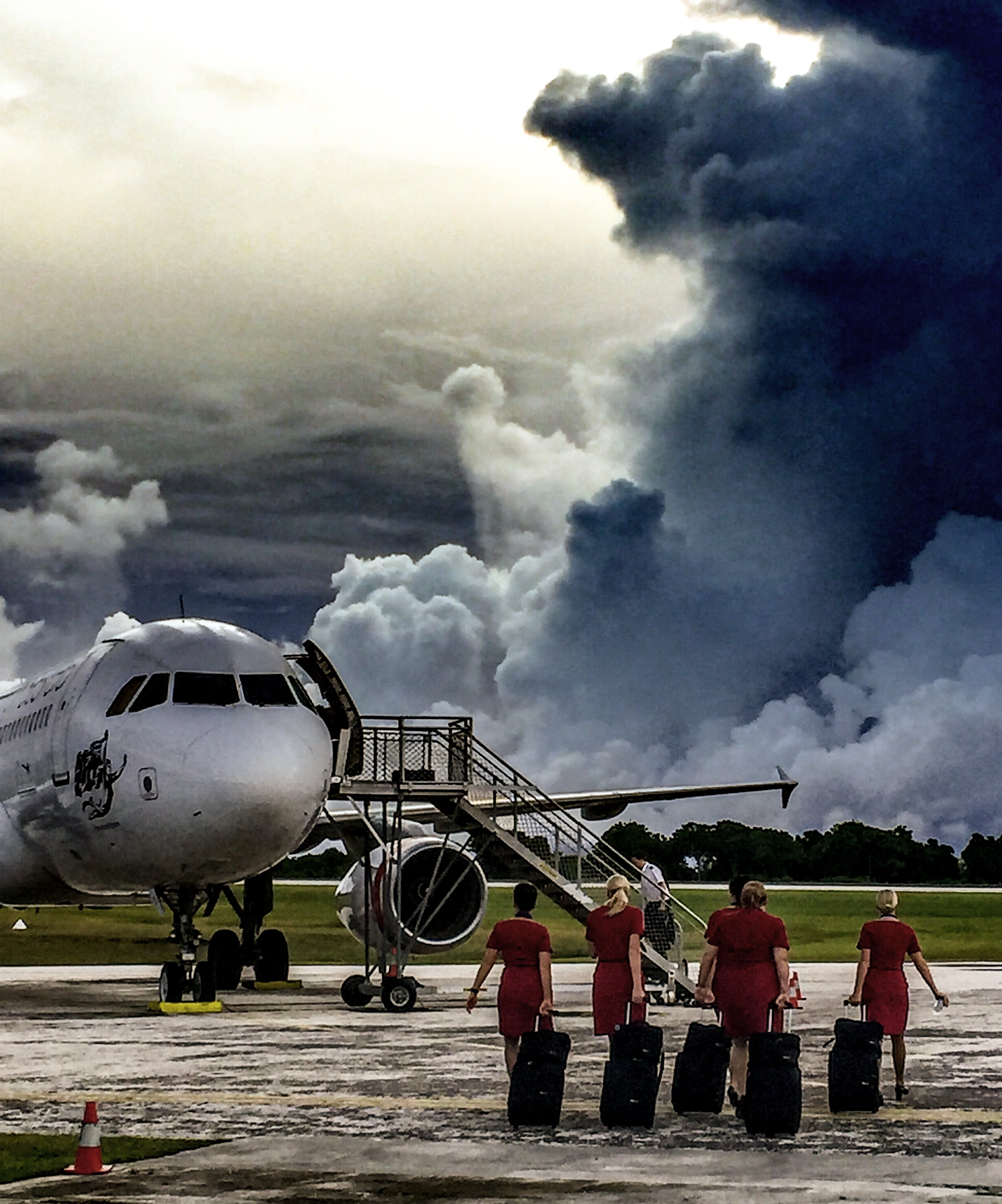
The Virgin Australia crew boarding an Airbus A320 at Christmas Island Airport

Airlines	Destinations
QantasLink	Cocos (Keeling) Islands, Perth
Virgin Australia Regional Airlines	Perth

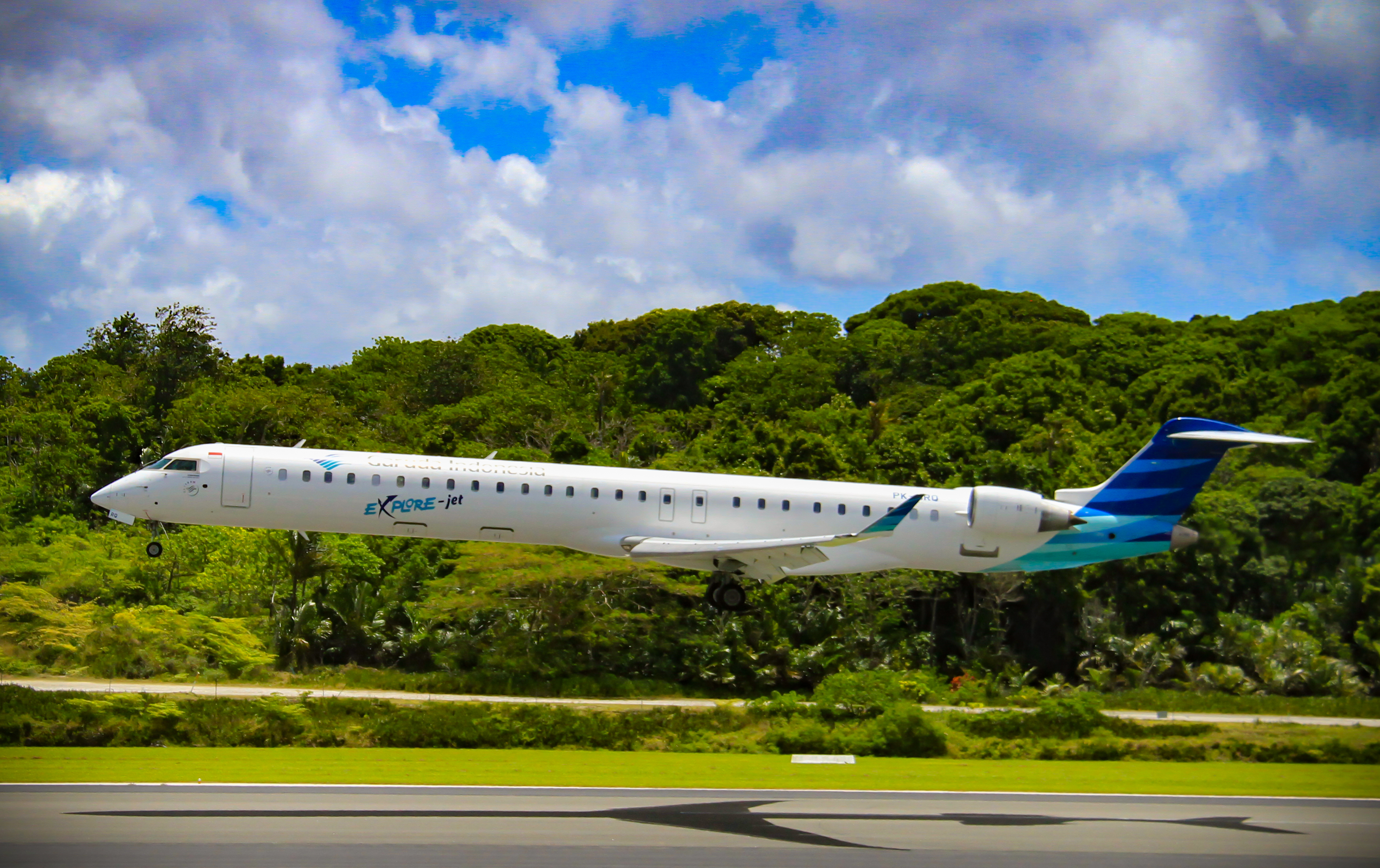
A Bombardier CRJ1000 of Garuda Indonesia Explore-jet landing at Christmas Island Airport on its weekly service from Jakarta (2017)

Traffic to and from the airport varies greatly. Along with regular flights to the Australian mainland, the airport receives weekly open charter flights from Jakarta with Garuda Indonesia and fortnightly open charter flights from Kuala Lumpur with Batik Air Malaysia. Historically airlines such as Indonesia AirAsia, Malaysia Airlines and SilkAir travelled to the island. Tourist attractions such as the migration of the Christmas Island red crab and the island's Christmas Island Resort have caused spikes in traffic levels. The construction of an immigration detention centre on the island resulted in a temporary increase in RAAF and DIMIA arrivals.

== Statistics ==
Christmas Island International Airport served 26,723 revenue passengers during financial year 2017–2018.

Annual passenger and aircraft statistics for Christmas Airport
Year	Revenue passengers	Aircraft movements
2001–02	6,515	229
2002–03	8,778	303
2003–04	7,504	249
2004–05	8,125	255
2005–06	8,093	256
2006–07	8,072	262
2007–08	8,594	412
2008–09	6,665	246
2009–10	14,287	395
2010–11	27,286	428
2011–12	37,305	623
2012–13	65,383	1,008
2013–14	60,099	818
2014–15	31,499	396
2015–16	25,533	285
2016–17	25,615	318
2017–18	26,723	347

== See also ==
- List of airports in territories of Australia
- Aviation transport in Australia
