= No. 220 Squadron RAF =

Defunct flying squadron of the Royal Air Force

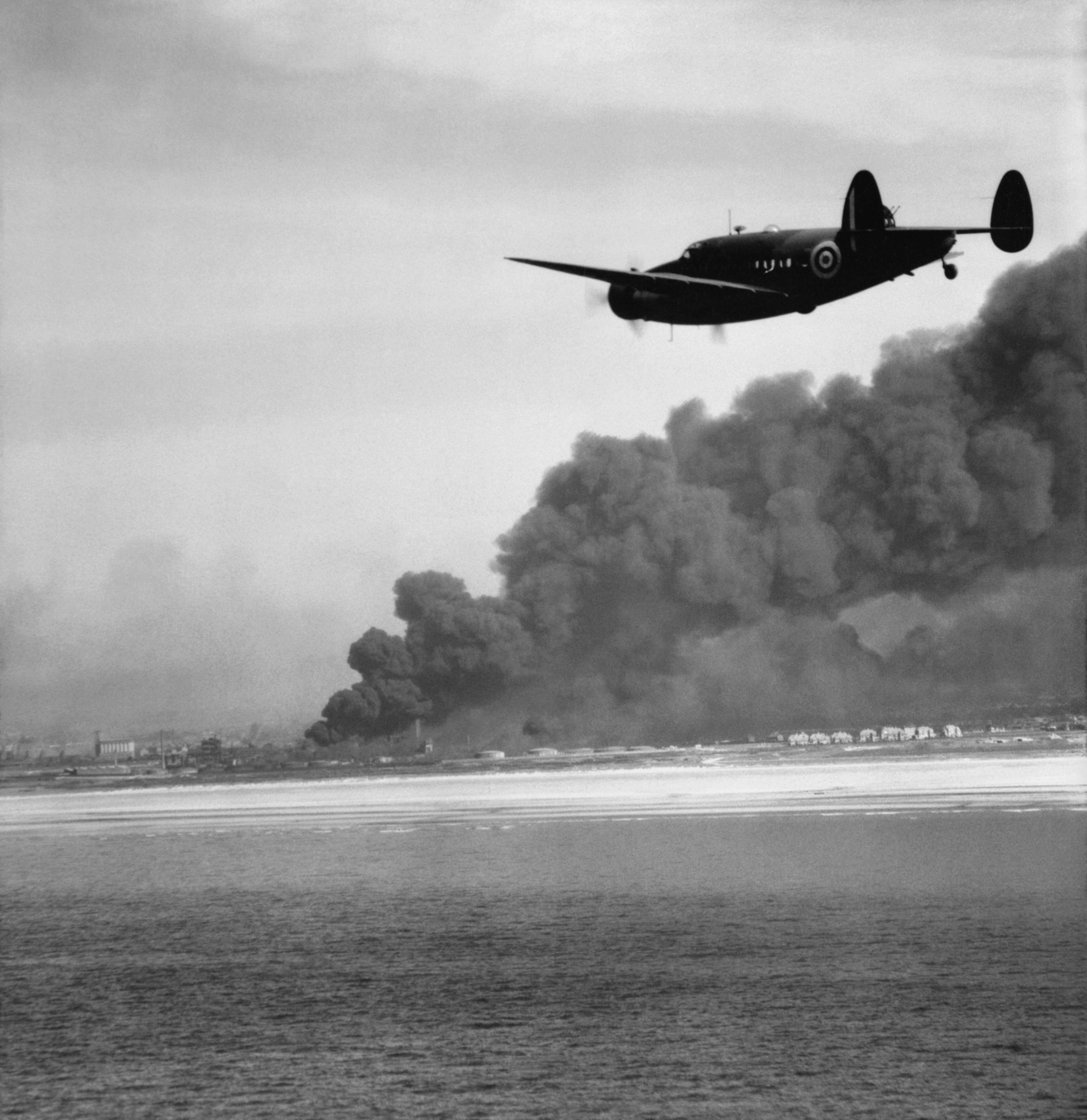
- A Hudson of 220 Sqn over the Dunkirk beaches during the British evacuation, 1940.
- Active: 14 September 1918 - 21 May 1919; 17 August 1936 - 25 May 1946; 24 September 1951 - 1 October 1958; 22 July 1959 – 10 July 1963
- Country: United Kingdom
- Branch: Royal Air Force
- Type: Royal Air Force squadron
- Role: Maritime Patrol
- Motto: ΚΑΘΟΡΩΜΕΝ ΑΙΣΤΟΙ (Greek: We Observe Unseen

Insignia
- Squadron badge heraldry: On a pellet between two eight-pointed stars, a torch inflamed
- Squadron codes: 220 Aug 1936 - Apr 1939; HU Apr 1939 - Jun 1939; PK Jun 1939 - Sep 1939; NR Sep 1939 - Aug 1943; MB Feb 1942 - Mar 1942 (Middle East detachment); 2 Aug 1943 - Jul 1944; ZZ Dec 1944 - Jun 1945; 8D Jun 1945 - May 1946; T Sep 1951 - 1956; 220 1956 - Oct 1958

No. 220 Squadron of the Royal Air Force (RAF) was founded in 1918 and disbanded in 1963 after four separate periods of service. The squadron saw service in both the First and Second World Wars, as a maritime patrol unit, and finally as part of Britain's strategic nuclear deterrent.

== History ==
=== First World War ===
The squadron predated the foundation of the RAF and was founded as a unit of the Royal Naval Air Service (RNAS) . From 1915, the RNAS formed numbered wings, which controlled their own lettered squadrons. No. 2 Wing RNAS, with its subordinate squadrons, was assigned to the Aegean area. One of the squadrons was 'C' Squadron, comprising Nos. 475, 476 and 477 Flights. DH.4s were, in time, joined by DH.9s and Sopwith Camels. On the formation of the RAF, on 1 April 1918, the Wing was integrated as No. 62 Wing RAF. The flights kept their numbers, rather than the customary letters, as each Flight operated a different aircraft type and the squadron formed a self-contained bomber, or reconnaissance, force with its own integral fighter cover. No. 475 Flight flew DH.4 day-bombers, No. 476 Flight flew DH.9 day-bombers and the fighter-flight, No. 477 Flight, flew Sopwith Camels. Most of the Wing was based at Mudros, but this squadron was based on the nearby island of Imbros. It was not given the 'number-plate' of No. 220 Sqn., RAF until 14 September 1918. In February 1919 the squadron moved as a cadre to Mudros on the nearby island of Lemnos, where it was disbanded on 21 May 1919.

=== Second World War ===
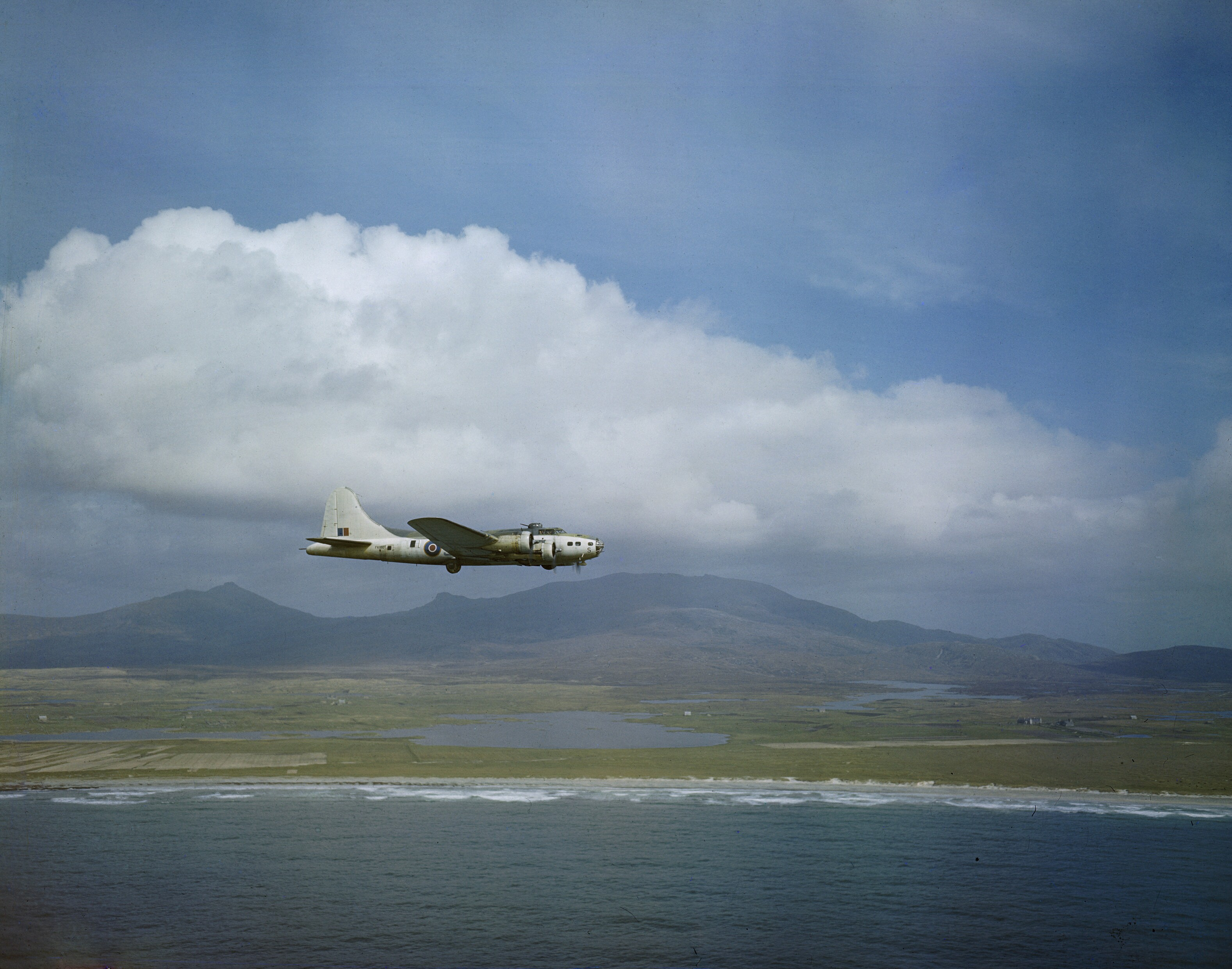
A 220 Sqn Fortress IIA, in 1943.

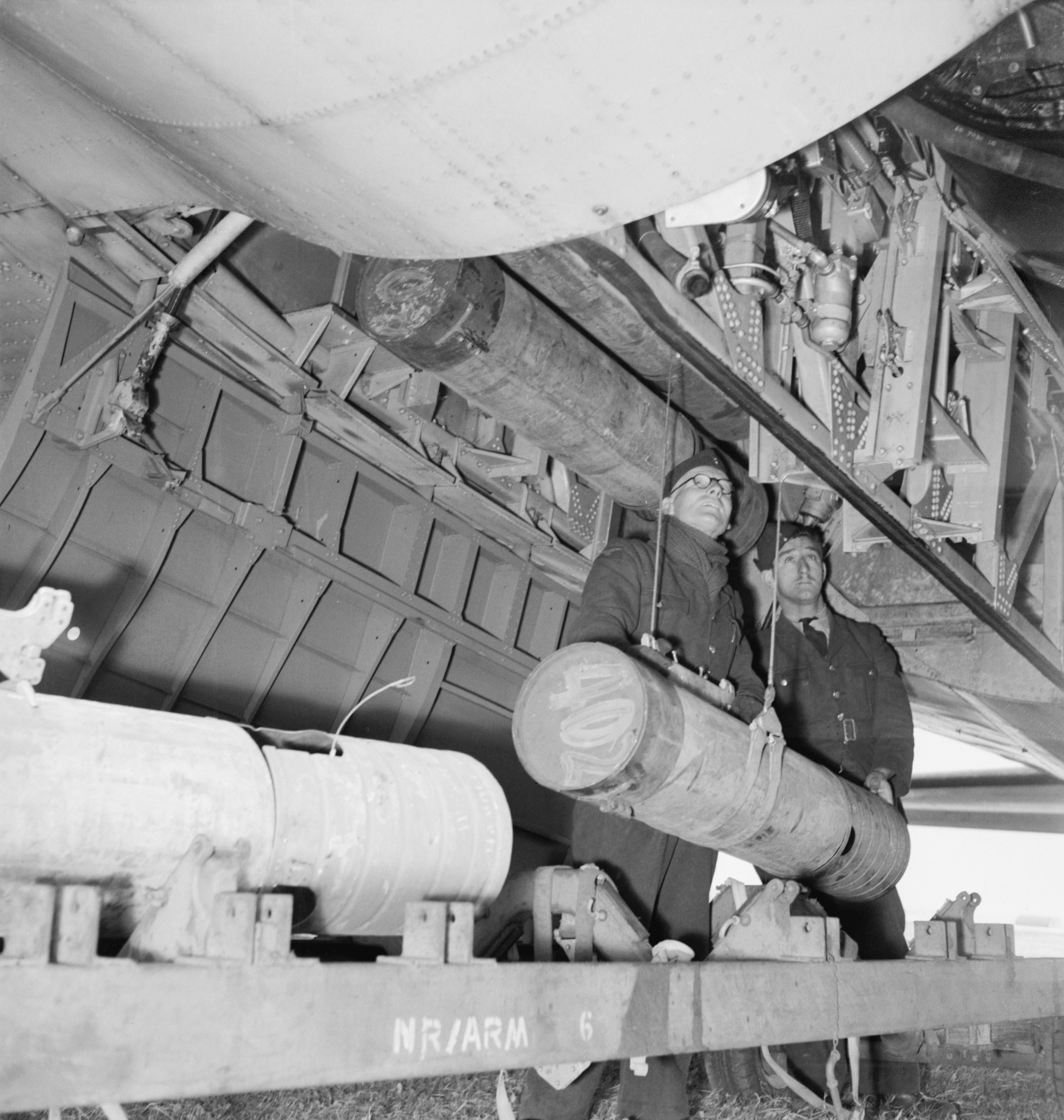
Loading 250 lb depth charges into a 220 Squadron Fortress IIA at RAF Benbecula

In the buildup to the Second World War, No. 220 Squadron was reformed, as part of the new Coastal Command, at RAF Bircham Newton in Norfolk, during 1936. It was designated a general reconnaissance (GR) squadron, on maritime patrol duties, flying Avro Anson multi-role aircraft. On the outbreak of war it flew patrols from RAF Thornaby in Yorkshire, as part of No. 18 Group.

In November 1939, it converted to Lockheed Hudson an American light bomber and maritime patrol aircraft and began a new role, flying strike − or anti-shipping − missions. The squadron became operational in this role, in the North Sea, from May 1940 onwards. In April 1941, still in the anti-shipping role, it moved to RAF Wick in Scotland, to fly strikes against Norwegian coastal traffic.

In February 1942 the squadron began to operate the Boeing Fortress, an American four-engined heavy bomber, having moved to RAF Nutts Corner in Northern Ireland that month, as part of No. 15 Group. In June 1942 it moved to RAF Ballykelly, situated in County Londonderry, Northern Irelan, and then, in March 1943, to RAF Benbecula in the Outer Hebrides. Detachments also operated from RAF Bircham Newton, RAF St Eval in Cornwall and RAF Detling in Kent, during 1940, and even from RAF Shallufa in Egypt, from early November 1941.

In October 1943 the squadron transferred to RAF Lagens, in the Azores, as a unit of No. 247 Group. In December 1944, it was re-equipped with Consolidators Liberators, an American four-engines heavy bomber. From 1943 until the end of the war the squadron's role was anti-submarine (ASW) patrols over the southern North Atlantic.

In June 1945, with the end of the war in Europe, the squadron was brought home. It was transferred to Transport Command and Flew trooping flights, bringing men home from India, from October 1945 to April 1946. With this duty done, the squadron was disbanded in May 1946.

=== Cold War ===
In September 1951 the squadron was reformed, back as part of Coastal Command and again operating in the maritime reconnaissance (MR) role. It was based at RAF St Mawgan in Cornwall and was equipped with Avro Shackleton, a long range maritime patrol aircraft. In 1953, the Squadron aircraft flew in formation in a flypast, on the occasion of the Coronation of Queen Elizabeth II. At the time, the Avro Shackleton was fitted with a mid-upper gun-turret, the Bristol turret mounting twin 20 mm Hispano cannon, though this was later removed. No. 220 Squadron was the last RAF operational aircraft so equipped.

In October 1958, the squadron was redesignated as No. 201 Squadron.

The following year, in July 1959, No. 220 (SM) Squadron RAF was reformed. The designation "SM'" stood for Strategic Missile, and the squadron was now equipped with three Thor ballistic missiles, carrying a 1.4 megaton W-49 nuclear warhead, as part of the UK-US strategic deterrent, Project Emily. It was based at RAF North Pickenham in Norfolk until it was disbanded for the last time, along with the other Thor squadrons, in 1963.

== See also ==
- List of Royal Air Force aircraft squadrons
- List of UK Thor missile bases
