= Alick Stevens =

Royal Air Force Air Marshal (1898–1987)

Sir Alick Stevens
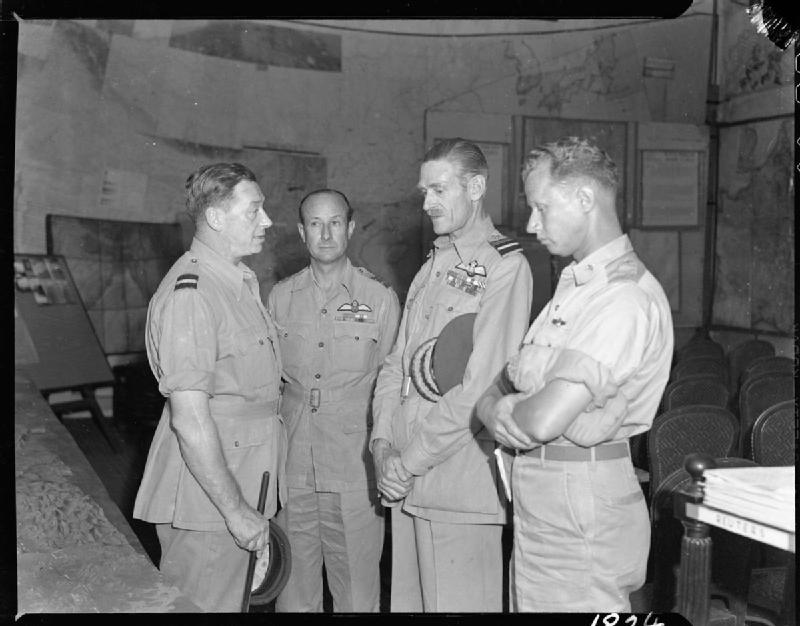
- Air Vice Marshal Stevens with senior officers in the War Room at Headquarters Strategic Air Force, Eastern Air Command in Calcutta
- Born: 31 July 1898
- Died: 2 July 1987 (aged 88)
- Military career
- Allegiance: United Kingdom
- Branch: Royal Navy (1916–18); Royal Air Force (1918–53)
- Service years: 1916–53
- Rank: Air Marshal
- Commands: Coastal Command (1951–53); RAF East Africa (1950); British Forces Aden (1948–50); No. 22 Group (1946–48); No. 4 Group (1945–46); No. 47 Group (1945); RAF Gibraltar (1944–45); No. 205 Squadron (1936–37)
- Conflicts: First World War; Second World War
- Awards: Knight Commander of the Order of the British Empire; Companion of the Order of the Bath; Mentioned in Despatches

Air Marshal Sir Alick Charles Stevens, KBE, CB (31 July 1898 – 2 July 1987) was a Royal Air Force officer who became Air Officer Commanding-in-Chief at RAF Coastal Command from 1951 until his retirement in 1953.

== RAF career ==
Educated at Victoria College, Jersey, Stevens joined the Royal Naval Air Service in 1916. He served in the First World War and after having to land in the Thames Estuary following engine failure in November 1916, he was picked up by a German U-Boat, becoming a prisoner of war at Osnabrück in North Germany for the remainder of the war. He was appointed Officer Commanding No. 205 Squadron in 1935. He served in the Second World War as deputy director and then director of Operations (Naval Co-operation) until 1943 when he became Senior Air Staff Officer at Headquarters No. 18 (Reconnaissance) Group. He was made Air Officer Commanding RAF Gibraltar in 1944.

After the War he served as Air Officer Commanding No. 47 Group, Air Officer Commanding No. 4 Group and then Air Officer Commanding No. 22 Group before being appointed Commander of British Forces Aden in 1948. He went on to be Air Officer Commanding RAF East Africa before becoming Senior Air Staff Officer at Headquarters RAF Coastal Command in 1950 and then Air Officer Commanding-in-Chief at RAF Coastal Command in 1951 and retiring in 1953.

Military offices
Preceded by Harold Lydford	Air Officer Commanding British Forces Aden; 1948–1950	Succeeded by Francis Fressanges
Preceded by Sir Charles Steele	Commander-in-Chief Coastal Command; 1951–1953	Succeeded by Sir John Boothman
