= Edgar McCloughry =

Royal Air Force Air Vice-Marshal (1896–1972)

Edgar Kingston-McCloughry
- Born: 10 September 1896; Hindmarsh, Australia
- Died: 15 November 1972 (aged 76); Edinburgh, Scotland
- Relatives: Wilfred McClaughry (brother)
- Military career
- Allegiance: Australia (1914–19); United Kingdom (1922–53)
- Branch: Australian Imperial Force; Australian Flying Corps; Royal Air Force
- Service years: 1914–1919; 1922–1953
- Rank: Air Vice-Marshal
- Commands: No. 38 Group (1950–51); No. 18 Group (1947–48); Allied Expeditionary Air Force Bombing Committee (1943–44); No. 44 Group (1941–43); No. 4 Squadron (1936–37)
- Conflicts: First World War; Western Front; Second World War; Operation Overlord
- Awards: Companion of the Order of the Bath; Commander of the Order of the British Empire; Distinguished Service Order; Distinguished Flying Cross & Bar; Mentioned in Despatches (3)

Air Vice-Marshal Edgar James Kingston-McCloughry, CB, CBE, DSO, DFC & Bar (10 September 1896 – 15 November 1972), born Edgar James McCloughry, was an Australian fighter pilot and flying ace of the First World War, and a senior commander in the Royal Air Force during the Second World War. He shot down 21 aircraft and military balloons during the former war, making him the 6th highest-scoring Australian ace. He was also awarded the Distinguished Service Order and the Distinguished Flying Cross and Bar as well as being mentioned in despatches.

== Military career ==
McCloughry joined the Australian Imperial Force in 1914, and served as a military engineer in Egypt and France before transferring to the Royal Flying Corps (RFC) in December 1916. He graduated from flying training in August 1917 and was posted to No. 23 Squadron RFC on the Western Front. He was seriously injured in a crash shortly thereafter and, after recovering in hospital, was reassigned as a flight instructor. He was reassigned again in 1918 to the Australian Flying Corps (AFC). He scored most of his victories there in the last few months of the war.

McCloughry left the AFC in August 1919 and pursued a career as an engineer in the United Kingdom before joining the Royal Air Force (RAF) in 1922. He served in a strategy-planning capacity through the Second World War. In 1940, under the influence of Lord Beaverbrook, he circulated a series of anonymous memos which were highly critical of senior RAF figures; in response, he was posted to South Africa, but the fallout continued and by the end of the year the Chief of the Air Staff and several other commanders had been replaced.

McCloughry retired from the RAF in 1953 as an air vice-marshal, spending some years as Managing Director of Reid and Sigrist Electrical and Aeronautical Engineers in Braunstone, Leicester in England, and died in 1972 in Edinburgh.

Military offices
Preceded by Sturley Simpson	Air Officer Commanding No. 18 Group; 1947–1948	Succeeded by David Carnegie
Preceded by Alfred Sharp	Air Officer Commanding No. 38 Group; 1950–1951	Group disbanded
