= Desmond Hughes =

Royal Air Force Air Vice-Marshal (1919-1992)

- Born: 6 June 1919; Belfast
- Died: 11 January 1992 (aged 72)
- Military career
- Allegiance: United Kingdom
- Branch: Royal Air Force
- Service years: 1939–1974
- Rank: Air Vice-Marshal
- Conflicts: Second World War
- Awards: Companion of the Order of the Bath; Commander of the Order of the British Empire; Distinguished Service Order; Distinguished Flying Cross and Two bars Air Force Cross

Air Vice-Marshal Frederick Desmond Hughes, CB, CBE, DSO, DFC & Two Bars, AFC (6 June 1919 – 11 January 1992) was a Royal Air Force officer who served as Air Officer Commanding at No. 18 Group.

== RAF career ==
Educated at Campbell College, Belfast and Pembroke College, Cambridge, Hughes joined the Royal Air Force as a cadet at the Royal Air Force College Cranwell in September 1939 and was commissioned in October 1939. He served with No. 264 Squadron during the Battle of Britain and became an accomplished night fighter being awarded the Distinguished Flying Cross in April 1941, a bar to his Distinguished Flying Cross in April 1943 and a second bar to his Distinguished Flying Cross in September 1943. He became officer commanding No. 604 Squadron in July 1944 during the latter stages of the Second World War.

After the war Hughes joined the directing staff at the RAF Staff College, Bracknell in 1954, before becoming officer commanding RAF Geilenkirchen in 1959 and then Director of Air Staff Plans at the Air Ministry in January 1963. He went on to be Air Officer Administration at Headquarters RAF Flying Training Command in September 1966, Air Officer Commanding at No. 18 Group in October 1968 and Commandant of the RAF College in March 1970. His last appointment was as Senior Air Staff Officer at Headquarters Near East Air Force in October 1972 before retiring in June 1974.

Military offices
Preceded by Sandy Johnstone	Air Officer Commanding No. 18 Group; 1968–1970	Succeeded by Sir Robert Craven
