= Brian Reynolds (RAF officer) =

Royal Air Force Air Marshal (1902-1965)

Sir Brian Reynolds
- Born: 4 June 1902
- Died: 6 December 1965 (aged 63)
- Military career
- Allegiance: United Kingdom
- Branch: Royal Air Force
- Service years: 1922–59
- Rank: Air Marshal
- Commands: Coastal Command (1956–59); AHQ Malta (1952–53); No. 22 Group (1950–52); No. 67 (Northern Ireland) Group (1950); RAF Northern Ireland (1948–50); No. 64 (Northern) Group (1946–48); No. 801 Squadron (1936–38); No. 43 Squadron (1936)
- Conflicts: Second World War
- Awards: Knight Commander of the Order of the Bath; Commander of the Order of the British Empire; Mentioned in Despatches (2); Commander of the Order of Orange-Nassau (Netherlands)

Air Marshal Sir Brian Vernon Reynolds, KCB, CBE, DL (4 June 1902 – 6 December 1965) was a Royal Air Force officer who became Air Officer Commanding-in-Chief at RAF Coastal Command.

== RAF career ==
Educated at St Olave's Grammar School, Reynolds served with the 28th London Regiment (Artists' Rifles) before joining the Royal Air Force in 1922. Having served as Adjutant at RAF Leuchars he was appointed Officer Commanding No. 43 Squadron in January 1936 before moving on to be Officer Commanding No. 801 Squadron in June 1936. He served in the Second World War as Senior Air Staff Officer at Headquarters No. 247 Group and then at No. 222 Group.

After the war he became Chief of Staff to the Commander British Forces in Hong Kong before being appointed Air Officer Commanding No. 64 (Northern) Group in 1946, Air Officer Commanding RAF Northern Ireland in 1948 and Air Officer Commanding No. 67 (Northern Ireland) Group in March 1950. After that he was made Air Officer Commanding No. 22 Group in July 1950, Air Officer Commanding AHQ Malta in 1952 and Deputy Commander-in-Chief (Air) at Allied Forces Mediterranean in 1953 before becoming Air Officer Commanding-in-Chief at RAF Coastal Command in 1956 and retiring in 1959.

In retirement he became Chairman of Malta Metropolitan Airlines.

Military offices
Preceded by Percy Maitland	Air Officer Commanding No. 22 Group; 1950–1952	Succeeded by Walter Merton
Preceded by Sir John Boothman	Air Officer Commanding-in-Chief Coastal Command; 1956 – 1959	Succeeded by Sir Edward Chilton
