= John Boothman =

Royal Air Force Air Chief Marshal (1901–1957)

Sir John Boothman
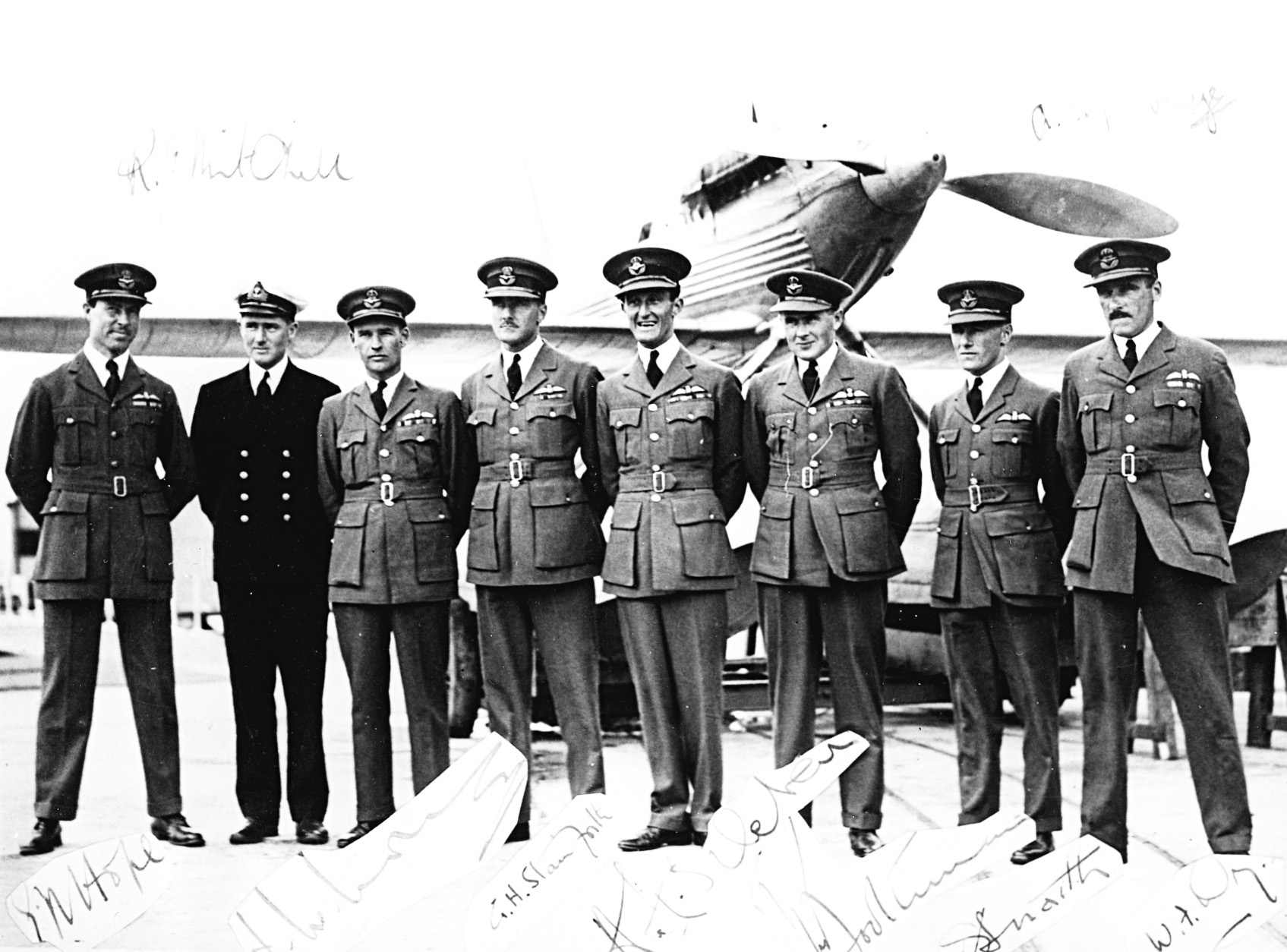
- British team for the Schneider Trophy race of 1931. Boothman is shown third from the right.
- Born: 19 February 1901
- Died: 29 December 1957 (aged 56)
- Military career
- Allegiance: United Kingdom
- Branch: Royal Air Force
- Service years: 1921–56
- Rank: Air chief marshal
- Commands: Coastal Command (1953–56); AHQ Iraq (1948–50); Aeroplane and Armament Experimental Establishment (1944–45); No. 106 Group (1944); No. 106 (Photo Reconnaissance) Wing (1943); RAF Finningley (1941–42); RAF Waddington (1941); No. 44 Squadron (1939)
- Conflicts: World War II
- Awards: Knight Commander of the Order of the Bath; Knight Commander of the Order of the British Empire; Distinguished Flying Cross; Air Force Cross; Mentioned in dispatches Croix de guerre (France); Commander of the Legion of Merit (United States); Distinguished Flying Cross (United States); War Cross (Czechoslovakia)

Air Chief Marshal Sir John Nelson Boothman, KCB, KBE, DFC, AFC (19 February 1901 – 29 December 1957) was a senior Royal Air Force officer during World War II who went on to high command in the post-war years.

== RAF career ==
Educated at Harrow County School for Boys, Boothman joined Royal Air Force in 1921 and chose to become a student and then an instructor at the Central Flying School. He went on to win the Schneider Trophy for seaplane flying in 1931. He attended the RAF Staff College, Andover, in 1935 and after tours on the staff of RAF Coastal Command and of RAF Far East he was appointed Officer Commanding No. 44 Squadron in September 1939 at the start of World War II. He transferred to the Directorate of Operations three months later and then joined the staff at Headquarters Bomber Command in July 1940. He was made Officer Commanding RAF Waddington in March 1941 and went to Washington, D.C., as an advisor to the US Air Force in October 1941. He went on to be Officer Commanding RAF Finningley before joining the staff of the Directorate of Operational Requirements at the Air Ministry in June 1942 and then becoming Air Officer Commanding No. 106 (Photo Reconnaissance) Wing in 1943. He was made Commandant of the Aeroplane and Armament Experimental Establishment in July 1944 and concluded the War as Assistant Chief of the Air Staff (Technical Requirements) which post he took up in July 1945.

After the War he became Air Officer Commanding AHQ Iraq and went on to be Controller of Supply (Air) at the Ministry of Supply in 1950. His last appointment was as Air Officer Commanding-in-Chief Coastal Command, a position he held until April 1956, just prior to his retirement.

== Family ==
In 1922 he married Gertrude Andrews.

Military offices
Preceded by Sir Alick Stevens	Commander-in-Chief Coastal Command; 1953–1956	Succeeded by Sir Brian Reynolds
