= Edward Chilton =

Royal Air Force Air Marshal (1906–1992)

Sir Edward Chilton
- Born: 1 November 1906
- Died: 4 August 1992 (aged 85)
- Military career
- Allegiance: United Kingdom
- Branch: Royal Air Force
- Service years: 1924–62
- Rank: Air Marshal
- Commands: Coastal Command (1959–62); AHQ Malta (1957–59); RAF Gibraltar (1952–53); AHQ Ceylon (1946–49); RAF Chivenor (1943–44)
- Conflicts: Second World War
- Awards: Knight Commander of the Order of the British Empire; Companion of the Order of the Bath; Grand Cross of the Order of Prince Henry (Portugal); Order of Polonia Restituta (Poland)

Air Marshal Sir Charles Edward Chilton, KBE, CB (1 November 1906 – 4 August 1992) was a Royal Air Force officer who served as Air Officer Commanding-in-Chief Coastal Command from 1959 to 1962.

== RAF career ==
Educated at Portsmouth Grammar School, Chilton joined the Royal Air Force in 1924. He specialised in navigation and, having served as a Navigation Instructor at the Central Flying School, was appointed Navigation Staff Officer at Headquarters RAF Bomber Command in 1937, a post he continued to hold during the early part of the Second World War. He moved on to be Command Navigation Officer at Headquarters RAF Flying Training Command in 1941. In 1943 he became Station Commander at RAF Chivenor where his role was to harry U-boats sailing in the Eastern Atlantic.

After the war he was made Air Officer Commanding AHQ Ceylon before becoming Director of Personal Services in 1949 and Air Officer Commanding RAF Gibraltar in 1952. He went on to be Assistant Chief of the Air Staff (Policy) in 1953, Senior Air Staff Officer at Headquarters RAF Coastal Command in 1955 and Air Officer Commanding AHQ Malta in 1957. His last appointment was as Air Officer Commanding-in-Chief RAF Coastal Command in 1959 before retiring in 1962.

In retirement he was a Director at IBM (Rentals).

== Family ==
In 1929 he married Betty Wrinch; they had one son. Following the death of his first wife he married Joyce Cornforth (née Fenwick) in 1964.

Military offices
Preceded by Sir Brian Reynolds	Air Officer Commanding-in-Chief Coastal Command; 1959–1962	Succeeded by Sir Anthony Selway
