= David Carnegie (RAF officer) =

Royal Air Force Air Vice-Marshal (1897–1964)

David Vaughan Carnegie
- Carnegie in 1948
- Born: 7 February 1897; Leicester, East Midlands
- Died: 3 August 1964 (aged 67); Sibson, Cambridgeshire
- Military career
- Allegiance: United Kingdom
- Branch: Royal Naval Air Service (1917–18); Royal Air Force (1918–54)
- Service years: 1917–54
- Rank: Air Vice-Marshal
- Commands: Chief of the New Zealand Air Staff (1951–54); No. 18 Group (1948–50); RAF Wittering (1938–39); RAF Calshot (1930–32)
- Conflicts: First World War; Second World War
- Awards: Companion of the Order of the Bath; Commander of the Order of the British Empire; Air Force Cross; Officer of the Legion of Merit (United States)

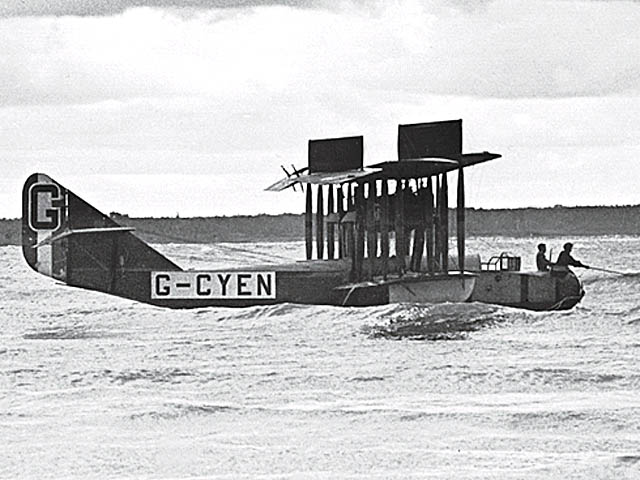
Felixstowe F.3 flying boat as used for North Sea anti-submarine patrol

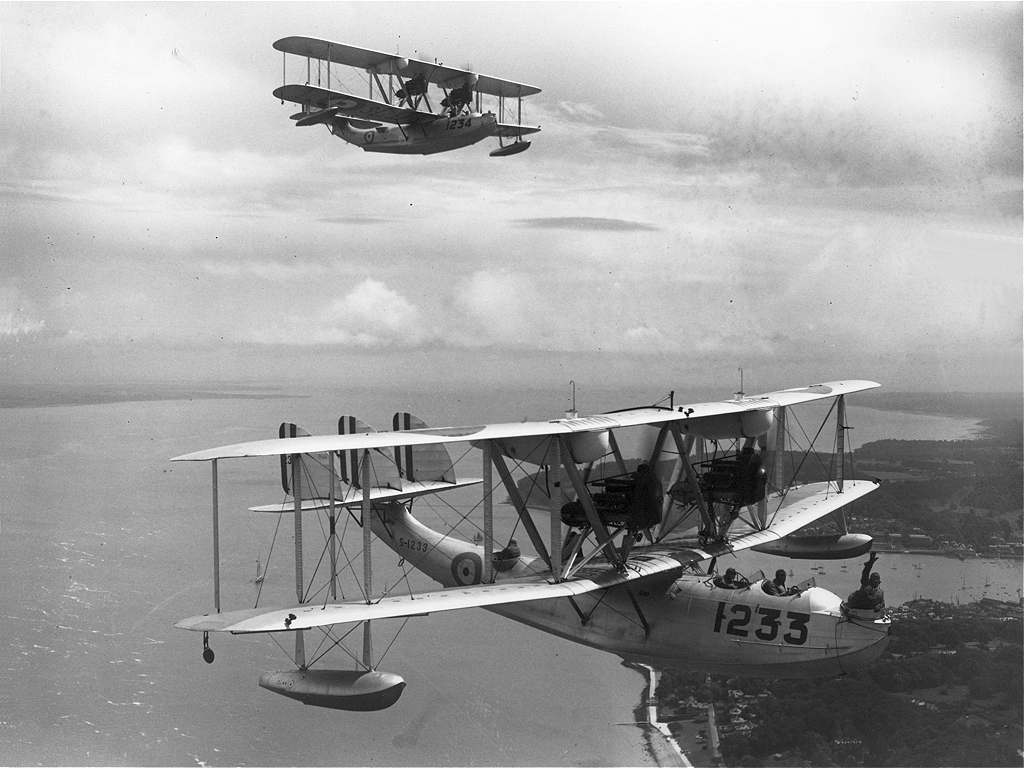
Supermarine Southampton flying boats as used by Far East Flight

Air Vice Marshal David Vaughan Carnegie, CB, CBE, AFC (7 February 1897 – 3 August 1964) was a senior Royal Air Force commander during the Second World War and the post-war decade.

== Early years ==
He was born in Leicester, the son of Aberdeen-born Congregational minister the Rev. Joseph Davidson Carnegie and his wife who was born Ella Gertrude Vaughan-Pryce. For many years afterwards his parents lived in Stamford, Lincolnshire. David Carnegie was educated at Wyggeston Grammar School in Leicester.

He was to marry Kathleen F Pugson in Florida in August 1942 and make their home in the new house he had built just before the war at Dundarg Castle near Fraserburgh. They had two daughters. After the war he described his hobbies as golf, fishing and restoring his castle home.

== Flying boats ==
He began his flying career in the Royal Naval Air Service in 1917 and until the armistice served as a pilot in North Sea patrols. The RNAS became the Royal Air Force at the beginning of April 1918.

Following his wartime service he was awarded a permanent commission in the rank of Flying Officer (Aeroplane and Seaplane) in October 1919.

After serving in the Mediterranean with 202 and 267 Flying Boat Squadrons he spent three years on flying boat test and experimental duties with MAEE.

=== Far East Flight ===
Carnegie joined the Singapore-based RAF Far East Flight in May 1927 as captain of Supermarine Southampton II flying boat S1150 studying the feasibility of long-distance flights by flying boat to Australia and the Far East, He subsequently remained in Singapore until early 1930, amongst other things helping set up the Singapore Flying Club.

=== Calshot ===
In 1930–1931 Carnegie was Officer Commanding the sea plane training squadron at RAF Calshot on Southampton Water, the United Kingdom's main seaplane/flying boat development and training unit.

David Carnegie was able to maintain his involvement with flying boats and sea planes until promoted to headquarters in 1932.

== Air Ministry ==
After passing through the Staff College in 1932 he was appointed to the Air Defence of Great Britain headquarters. From September 1936 he served in the Air Ministry's War Training Department until taking command of RAF Wittering in April 1938.

=== Wartime ===
With the outbreak of war in September 1939 he was immediately posted to Air Staff Fighter Command then in 1941 to Washington D.C. as Director of British Flying Training, a part of the RAF delegation. By war's end, 16,000 RAF aircrew had been trained in the United States. In September 1942 he was appointed Director of Flying Training at the Air Ministry. Late in the war he was appointed Acting Air Vice-Marshal then Air Commodore in 1946

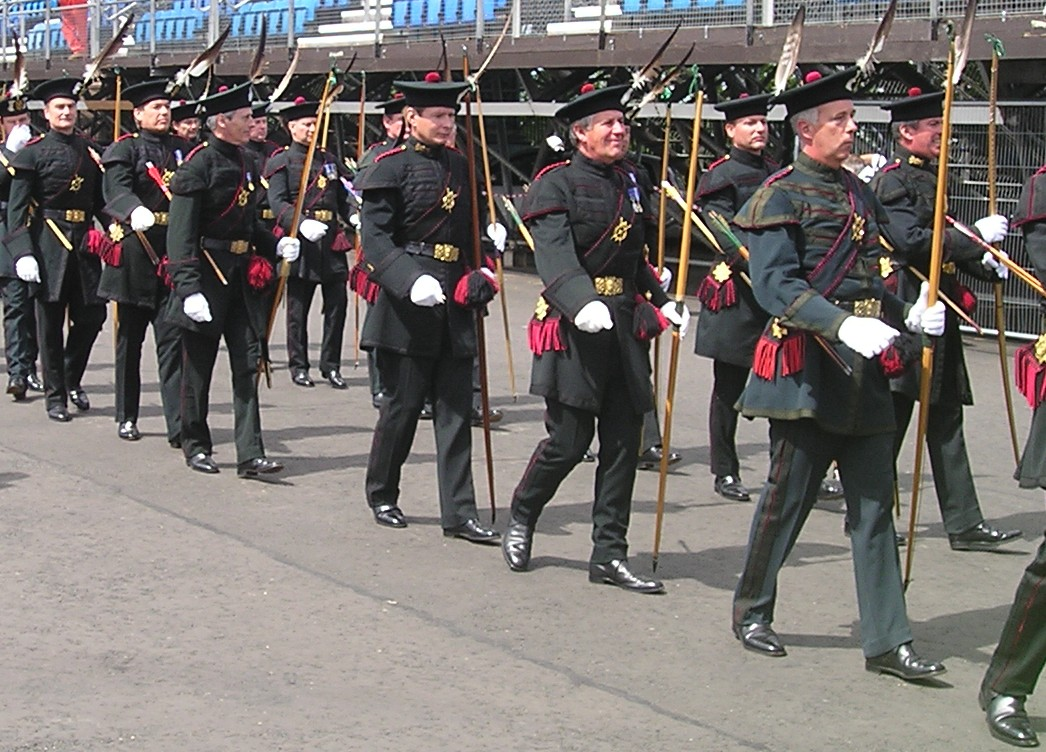
The Queen's Bodyguard for Scotland

=== Postwar ===
After his 1945 appointment as Air Force adviser to the UK High Commissioner in Ottawa he received the permanent appointment of Air Vice-Marshal on 1 January 1948 and served three more years, June 1948 to January 1951, as Air Officer Commanding No. 18 Group RAF Coastal Command and Senior Air Officer for Scotland. From January 1951 to February 1954 he served on secondment as the Chief of the Air Staff of the Royal New Zealand Air Force. In 1953, he was awarded the Queen Elizabeth II Coronation Medal.

David Carnegie was a member of The Queen's Bodyguard for Scotland.

== Retirement ==
Following some years as British Oxygen's Air Liaison Officer he was appointed director of Burghley House, Stamford, Lincolnshire.

David Carnegie died at his home, Sibson House near Peterborough in August 1964, soon after taking up his Burghley House appointment, leaving a widow and two daughters.

Military offices
Preceded by Air Vice Marshal Arthur de Terrotte Nevill	Chief of the Air Staff (RNZAF); 1951–1954	Succeeded by Air Vice Marshal Walter Merton
Preceded by Air Vice Marshal Edgar Kingston-McClaughry	Air Officer Commanding No. 18 Group; Also Air Officer Scotland; 1948–1950	Succeeded by Air Vice Marshal Harold Lydford
