= Sandy Johnstone =

Royal Air Force Air officer (1916–2000)

Alexander Vallance Riddell Johnstone
- Born: 2 June 1916; Glasgow, Scotland
- Died: 13 December 2000 (aged 84); Denham, Buckinghamshire
- Military career
- Allegiance: United Kingdom
- Branch: Royal Air Force
- Service years: 1934–1968
- Rank: Air Vice Marshal
- Nickname: "Sandy"
- Commands: No. 18 Group (1965–68); RAF Middleton St George (1958–61); Air Sea Warfare Development Unit (1952–53); RAF Ballykelly (1951–52); RAF Fairwood Common (1943–44); No. 602 Squadron (1940–41)
- Conflicts: Second World War: Battle of Britain; Indonesia–Malaysia confrontation
- Awards: Companion of the Order of the Bath; Distinguished Flying Cross; Air Efficiency Award; Mentioned in Despatches

Air Vice Marshal Alexander Vallance Riddell Johnstone, CB, DFC, AE, DL (2 June 1916 – 13 December 2000) was a Scottish airman. He served as a Royal Air Force squadron, wing and station commander during the Second World War and the commander of Commonwealth forces operating in Borneo during the Indonesia-Malaysia confrontation.

== Early life ==
Alexander Vallance Riddell Johnstone was born in Glasgow on 2 June 1916 and was educated at Kelvinside Academy. He worked in an Edinburgh footwear company and in 1934 he joined No. 602 (City of Glasgow) Auxiliary Air Force Squadron as a weekend flier.

== Royal Air Force ==
Early in 1938, Johnstone was a civilian navigation instructor at Scottish Aviation, moving later to the Civil Air Navigation School at Prestwick. In August 1939, he was called to full-time service with No. 602 Squadron. On 24 November 1939 George Pinkerton was promoted to squadron leader and given command of No. 65 Squadron RAF, with Johnstone taking over command of 'B' Flight from Pinkerton.

After participating in engagements with lone German raiders off the Scottish coast in late 1939-early 1940, he was given command of 602 Squadron in July 1940 at the age of 24. By this time Johnstone had already claimed a Heinkel He 111, a Junkers Ju 88 and a Dornier Do 17 damaged. The squadron was transferred south to RAF Westhampnett in West Sussex, where it was stationed throughout the Battle of Britain.

His tally after the battle (and his final wartime score) was 7 (and 2 shared) aircraft destroyed, 1 probable, and 6 (and 1 shared) damaged. He was awarded the Distinguished Flying Cross for his actions.

After serving as operations controller at RAF Turnhouse in Scotland in 1941, Johnstone was posted in April 1942 to RAF Haifa in Palestine as sector commander. He then went to Malta as station commander at RAF Luqa, before commanding a Spitfire wing. In the spring of 1943 he returned to Britain to attend the RAF Staff College. In September 1943 he moved on to RAF Fairwood Common, West Glamorgan, as sector commander.

In May 1944 Johnstone was promoted to acting group captain on the Allied Expeditionary Air Force operations staff preparing for the D-Day invasion. After the landings he moved to Normandy with General Eisenhower's headquarters staff.

Early in 1945 Johnstone joined the RAF delegation in Washington, D.C. He returned in June to Fighter Command No. 12 Group RAF HQ staff, receiving a permanent commission. In 1946 Johnstone was appointed air attache in Dublin, and went on to serve as station commander, RAF Ballykelly. In 1953 he was made Commanding Officer of the Air Sea Warfare Development Unit at RAF St Mawgan. In 1954 he returned to No. 12 Group RAF as Senior Air Staff Officer (SASO).

In 1956 he was deputy air defence commander, Malaya and was then seconded to assist in the formation of the Royal Federation of Malaya Air Force. After spells as station commander at RAF Middleton St. George, the Imperial Defence College, and director of personnel at the Air Ministry, in 1964 he was posted to Borneo as Air Commodore, Commonwealth Air Forces.

In 1965 he returned to the UK to become an air vice marshal. He headed Coastal Command's No. 18 Group RAF, was Air Officer Scotland and Northern Ireland, and was NATO's North Atlantic maritime air commander.

Johnstone was appointed a Companion of the Order of the Bath in 1966 and, reflecting his years as an Auxiliary Air Force officer, also held the much-prized Air Efficiency Award.

Johnstone retired from the Royal Air Force in 1968.

== Later life ==
From 1969 to 1979, Johnstone served as vice-chairman of the Territorial Auxiliary and Volunteer Reserve. He was also secretary of Glasgow Golf Club, and as head of the National Car Parks (NCP) and secretary of Denham Golf Club. From 1971 to 1994 he was Deputy Lieutenant for Glasgow.

He became a successful author and resided near Ipswich in Suffolk. Johnstone was an accomplished author, writing six books. Johnstone married Margaret Croll in 1940. They had a son, Iain Johnstone, an Army officer, and two daughters, Ann and Patricia. Sandy Johnstone died on 13 December 2000, aged 84.

== Works ==
- One Man's War (1964)
- Where no Angels Dwell ISBN 978-0859970082 (1969)
- Enemy in the Sky: My 1940 Diary ISBN 978-0718304744 (1976)
- Adventure in the Sky ISBN 978-0718301668 (1978)
- Spitfire into War ISBN 978-0718305949 (1986)
- Diary of an Aviator (1993)

Military offices
New title Air force established	Chief of the Air Staff of the Royal Malaysian Air Force; 1958	Succeeded by Noel Hyde
