= Paul Holder =

Royal Air Force Air Marshal (1911-2001)

Sir Paul Holder
- Born: 2 September 1911
- Died: 22 April 2001 (aged 89)
- Military career
- Allegiance: United Kingdom
- Branch: Royal Air Force
- Service years: 1936–68
- Rank: Air Marshal
- Commands: Coastal Command (1965–68); No. 25 (Training) Group (1963–64); AHQ Hong Kong (1957–60); AHQ Singapore (1957); RAF Kabrit (1952–53); RAF Shallufa (1950–52); RAF Broadwell (1946–47); No. 218 Squadron (1942)
- Conflicts: Second World War
- Awards: Knight Commander of the Order of the British Empire; Companion of the Order of the Bath; Distinguished Service Order; Distinguished Flying Cross

Air Marshal Sir Paul Davie Holder, KBE, CB, DSO, DFC (2 September 1911 – 22 April 2001) was a Royal Air Force officer who became Air Officer Commanding-in-Chief at RAF Coastal Command.

== RAF career ==
Educated at Bristol Grammar School, the University of Bristol and the University of Illinois, Holder joined the Royal Air Force in 1936. He served in the Second World War as a flight commander with No. 84 Squadron before becoming Station Administration Officer at RAF Habbaniya in Iraq. At Habbaniya he took a prominent role in the defence of the Station, using a Hawker Hart, when the Station was attacked by the Iraqi nationalist rebel Rashid Ali. He continued his war service as a Staff Officer at Headquarters RAF Bomber Command before becoming Officer Commanding No. 218 Squadron flying Stirling heavy bombers from RAF Marham in 1942. He became Senior Air Staff Officer with Force 686 at Ankara in Turkey in 1943 and Group Captain – Plans at Headquarters RAF Middle East Command in 1944 where is role was to form and train a Hurricane squadron manned by Yugoslav aircrew loyal to Josip Broz Tito.

After the war he joined Directing Staff at the RAF Staff College, Bracknell and then became Station Commander at RAF Broadwell in 1946. After a tour as vice-president of the Officer Selection Board, he became Chief Instructor at RAF Officer Cadet Training School in 1948. He was then successively Station Commander at RAF Shallufa and RAF Kabrit in Egypt before becoming deputy director of Air Staff Policy at the Air Ministry in 1953. He went on to be Air Officer Commanding AHQ Singapore in February 1957, Air Officer Commanding AHQ Hong Kong in November 1957 and Assistant Chief of the Air Staff (Training) at the Air Ministry in 1960. His last appointments were as Air Officer Commanding No. 25 (Training) Group in 1963 and Air Officer Commanding-in-Chief at RAF Coastal Command in 1965 before retiring in 1968.

In retirement he became a local councillor on Waverley Borough Council and wrote a paper entitled "The Theory of Interstellar Particles".

== Family ==
In 1940 he married Mary Elizabeth Kidd; they had two sons.

Military offices
Preceded by Sir Anthony Selway	Air Officer Commanding-in-Chief Coastal Command; 1965–1968	Succeeded by Sir John Lapsley
