= Anthony Selway =

Royal Air Force Air Marshal (1909-1984)

Sir Anthony Selway
- Born: 20 February 1909
- Died: 19 June 1984 (aged 75)
- Military career
- Allegiance: United Kingdom
- Branch: Royal Air Force
- Service years: 1927–65
- Rank: Air Marshal
- Commands: Coastal Command (1962–65); Far East Air Force (1960–62); No. 18 (Reconnaissance) Group (1958–60); Central Flying School (1951–53); RAF Aston Down (1944–45); No. 55 Operational Training Unit (1944–45); No. 14 Squadron (1938–40)
- Conflicts: Second World War
- Awards: Knight Commander of the Order of the Bath; Distinguished Flying Cross; Mentioned in Despatches

Air Marshal Sir Anthony Dunkerton "Mark" Selway, KCB, DFC (20 February 1909 – 19 June 1984) was a Royal Air Force officer who became Air Officer Commanding-in-Chief at Coastal Command from 1962 until his retirement in 1965.

== RAF career ==
Educated at Highgate School, Selway joined the Royal Air Force as a cadet in 1927. He was appointed Officer Commanding No. 14 Squadron in 1938 just before the Second World War and served in that role until October 1940 when he joined the Air Staff at Headquarters No. 203 Group. He transferred to the Air Staff (Operations) at Headquarters RAF Middle East in 1941 before becoming Chief Flying Instructor at the Empire Central Flying Training School in 1942 and Senior Air Staff Officer at Headquarters No. 23 (Training) Group in 1943. He went on to be Station Commander at RAF Aston Down in 1944 and Senior Officer Administration at Headquarters No. 232 Group in 1945.

After the War he was made Deputy Director of Flying Training at the Air Ministry and then Commandant at the Central Flying School in 1951 before becoming Air Attaché in Paris in 1953. He was then appointed Head of the RAF staff in Washington D. C. in 1955, Air Officer Commanding No. 18 (Reconnaissance) Group in 1958 and Commander-in-Chief Far East Air Force in 1960. He concluded his career as Air Officer Commanding-in-Chief at RAF Coastal Command in 1962 before retiring in 1965.

Military offices
Preceded by The Earl of Bandon	Commander-in-Chief Far East Air Force; 1960–1962	Succeeded by Sir Hector McGregor
Preceded by Sir Edward Chilton	Air Officer Commanding-in-Chief Coastal Command; 1962–1965	Succeeded by Sir Paul Holder
