= Geoffrey Rhodes Bromet =

Royal Air Force Air Vice-Marshal (1891-1983)

Air Vice Marshal Sir Geoffrey Bromet KBE CB DSO DL
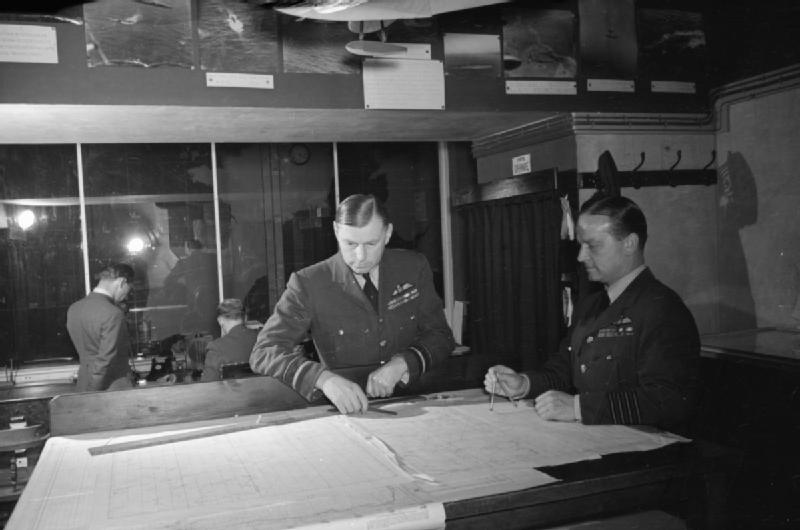
- Air Vice Marshal Bromet and Group Captain H. Brackley, review U-boat positions, August 1942

18th Lieutenant Governor of the Isle of Man
- In office 1945–1952
- Monarch: George VI
- Preceded by: Earl Granville
- Succeeded by: Sir Ambrose Dundas

Personal details
- Born: Geoffrey Rhodes Bromet; 28 August 1891
- Died: 16 November 1983 (aged 92)
- Spouse: Jean Conan Doyle

Military service
- Allegiance: United Kingdom
- Branch/service: Royal Navy (1904–18); Royal Air Force (1918–45)
- Years of service: 1904–1945
- Rank: Air Vice Marshal
- Commands: No. 247 Group (1943–45); No. 19 Group (1941–43); Marine Aircraft Experimental Establishment (1928–31); RAF Felixstowe (1928–31); School of Naval Co-operation and Aerial Navigation (1921–22); No. 8 Squadron RNAS (1916–17); No. 1 Squadron RNAS (1916)
- Battles/wars: First World War; Second World War
- Awards: Knight Commander of the Order of the British Empire; Companion of the Order of the Bath; Distinguished Service Order; Mentioned in Despatches; Chevalier of the Legion of Honour (France); Commanders Cross with Star of the Order of Polonia Restituta (Poland); Grand Officer of the Order of the White Lion (Czechoslovakia); Commander of the Legion of Merit (United States)

Sir Geoffrey Rhodes Bromet KBE, CB, DSO, DL (28 August 1891 – 16 November 1983) was a senior Royal Air Force (RAF) officer during the Second World War and Lieutenant Governor of the Isle of Man from 1945 to 1952. Bromet Road in the town of Castletown, Isle of Man, takes its name from him.

== RAF career ==
Bromet attended Bradfield College and the Royal Naval College, Dartmouth and then served as a Flight Commander in the First World War, being commended for his service at Gallipoli in 1915 and later commanding No. 1 Squadron RNAS and then No. 8 Squadron RNAS. In 1919 he was commissioned permanently as a major in the Royal Air Force. After commanding the Marine Aircraft Experimental Establishment, he was appointed Senior Engineering Staff Officer at Headquarters Coastal Area in 1931, Senior Air Staff Officer at Headquarters RAF Middle East in 1933 and Senior Air Staff Officer at Headquarters RAF Coastal Command in 1936.

He served in the Second World War as Air Officer Commanding No. 19 Group and then as Air Officer Commanding No. 247 Group before retiring at his own request in 1945.

In 1945 he was appointed Lieutenant Governor of the Isle of Man and served until 1952.

His second marriage was to Air Commandant Dame Jean Conan Doyle, daughter of Sir Arthur Conan Doyle.

Military offices
Preceded by Gerald Boyce	Air Officer Commanding No. 19 Group; 1941–1943	Succeeded by Brian Baker
New title Group established	Air Officer Commanding No. 247 Group; 1943–1945	Succeeded by Harold Southey
Government offices
Preceded by Earl Granville	Lieutenant Governor of the Isle of Man; 1945–1952	Succeeded by Sir Ambrose Dundas
