= No. 247 Group RAF =

Former Royal Air Force operations group

No. 247 (General Reconnaissance) Group RAF
- No. 247 Group badge
- Active: 1 October 1943 – 1 March 1946
- Country: United Kingdom
- Branch: Royal Air Force
- Type: Royal Air Force group
- Role: Maritime Reconnaissance (1943–1946)
- Part of: RAF Coastal Command
- Motto(s): Portuguese: Valor Lealdade E Merito ("Value Loyalty and Merit")
- Royal Air Force Ensign
- Engagements: World War II: Battle of the Atlantic

Commanders
- Notable commanders: Air Vice-Marshal Sir Geoffrey Rhodes Bromet KBE, CB, DSO, DL

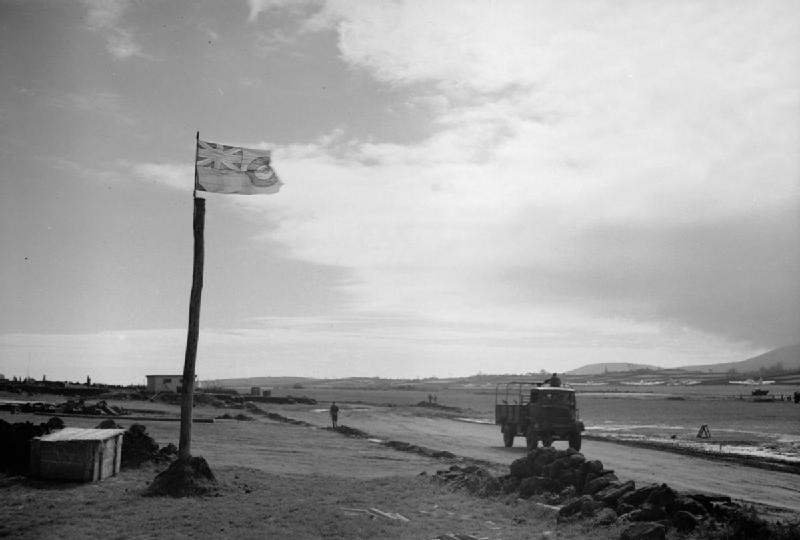
Sunset view of the RAF Ensign flying by the airfield at Lagens

No. 247 Group (247 Gp) was formed in October 1943 within RAF Coastal Command to control units operating from the Azores. It disbanded in March 1946.

== History ==
=== Second World War ===
On 1 October 1943, in Liverpool, No. 247 (General Reconnaissance) Group was formed within RAF Coastal Command. It was tasked with the responsibility for the control of units operating out of the Azores. On 8 October the group arrived into Angra do Heroísmo on Terceira Island, within the Azores, having travelled on the HMT Franconia, which was an ocean liner that had been requisitioned as a troopship.

Air Vice-Marshal Geoffrey Rhodes Bromet KBE, CB, DSO, DL was appointed AOC on the 18 September 1943 – The group initially controlled three units: detachments from both Nos. 172 and 179 Squadrons, both units equipped with Vickers Wellington XIV, a twin-engined, long-range medium bomber and this variant had ASV Mark III radar and rocket rails under the wings, and No. 220 Squadron, which operated Boeing Fortress II, an American four-engined heavy bomber. Later during October 1943 saw the arrival of No. 206 Squadron, which also operated with Boeing Fortress II. Maritime patrols started on 20 October 1943 and by the end of the month the initial squadrons were joined by a detachment of nine Lockheed Hudson, an American light bomber and coastal reconnaissance aircraft, from No. 233 Squadron which was based at Gibraltar. The groups initial targets were Kriegsmarine resupply U-boats or 'milch cow' and by the end of November it was understood that the German admiral Karl Dönitz was putting together a large 'wolfpack' with an assumed target of convoys headed for Gibraltar. The U-boats were unable to get into a position to attack the convoys due to the amount of anti-submarine warfare aircraft the group had to hand. The group relocated its headquarters to RAF Lagens on 4 December 1943, remaining there for just over two years until it disbanded into HQ RAF Azores on 1 March 1946.

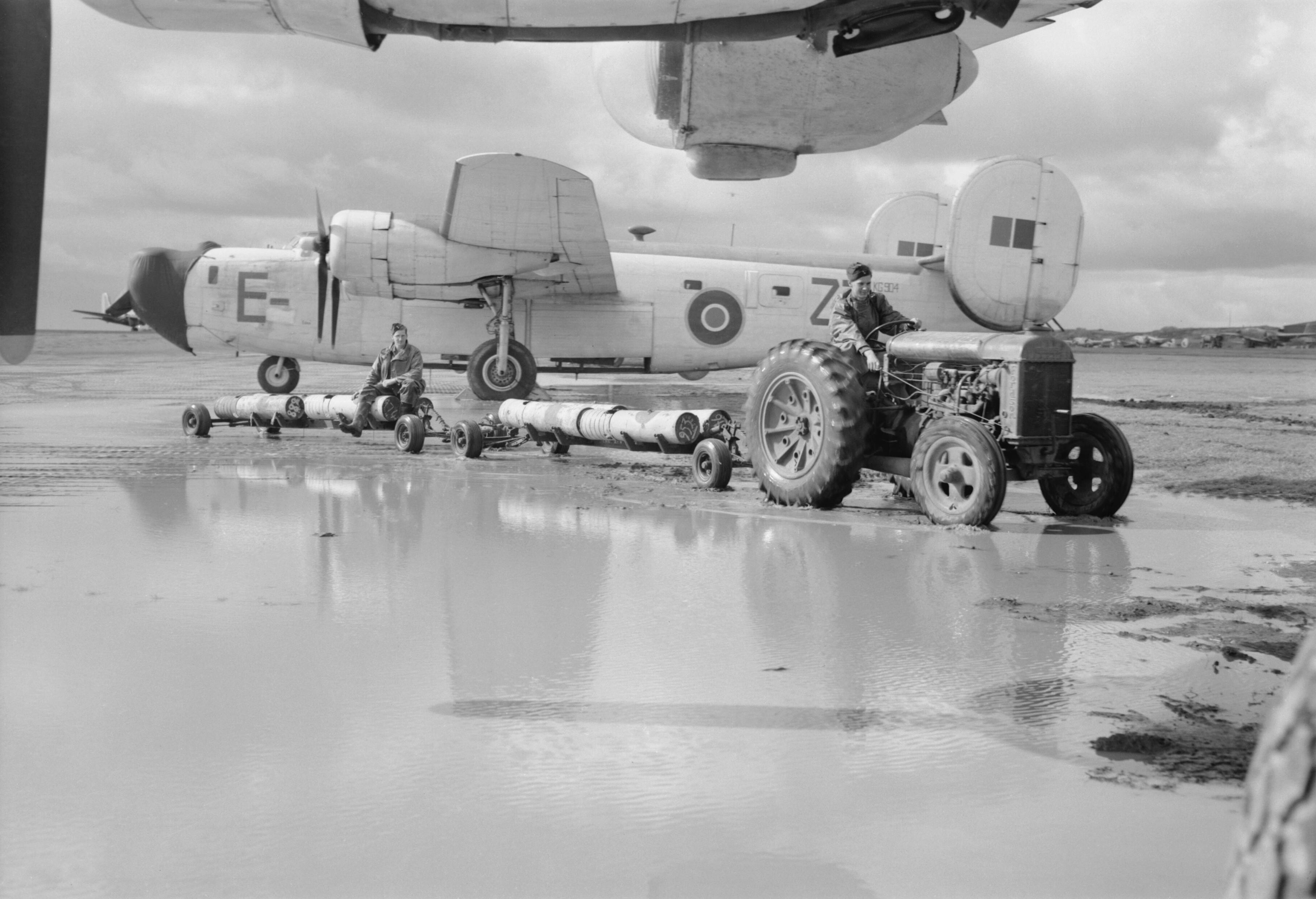
An RAF tractor, towing trolleyloads of depth-charges, negotiates a flooded disperal area between Consolidated Liberator GR Mark VIs of No. 220 Squadron RAF parked at Lagens. KG904 'ZZ-E' stands in the background

On 8 March 1944 No. No. 269 Squadron arrived at RAF Lagens with Lockheed Hudson IIIA, Miles Martinet, a target tug aircraft, Supermarine Walrus, an amphibious biplane and Supermarine Spitfire VB, a single-seat fighter aircraft. No. 206 Squadrons stay was relatively short and the squadron left for RAF Davidstow Moor, in Cornwall, England, on 18 March 1944, and the No. 233 Squadron detachment had left for RAF Blakehill Farm, in Wiltshire, England, two weeks earlier. The No. 179 Squadron Vickers Wellington detachment left for RAF Predannack, in Cornwall, England, the following month, on 28 April 1944. By July 1944 the group consisted three units: No. 172 Squadron (det) with Vickers Wellington, No. 220 Squadron, which was replacing its Boeing Fortress II with the Boeing Fortress III variant and No. 269 Squadron, equipped with various aircraft.

On 1 September 1944 the Vickers Wellington detachment from No. 172 Squadron left the Azores for Northern Ireland, moving to RAF Limavady. During the same month No. 269 Squadron started to add Vickers Warwick to its inventory, a British multi-purpose twin-engined aircraft, capable of Maritime reconnaissance, air-sea rescue and transport. December 1944 saw No. 220 Squadron start to receive and convert to Consolidated Liberator VI, an American heavy bomber used as a long-range general reconnaissance anti-submarine patrol aircraft by Coastal Command. The squadron remained at RAF Lagens for a further six months, leaving not long after VE Day for RAF St Davids in Wales, on 1 June 1945. By July 1945, No 247 Group controlled one unit with No. 269 Squadron undertaking maritime patrol and air-sea rescue duties. During November 1945 No. 280 Squadron provided a short lived detachment of Vickers Warwick I.

No. 247 Group disbanded, on 1 March 1946, into HQ RAF Azores. On the 10 March 1946 No. 269 Squadron disbanded at RAF Lagens.

=== Order of Battle ===
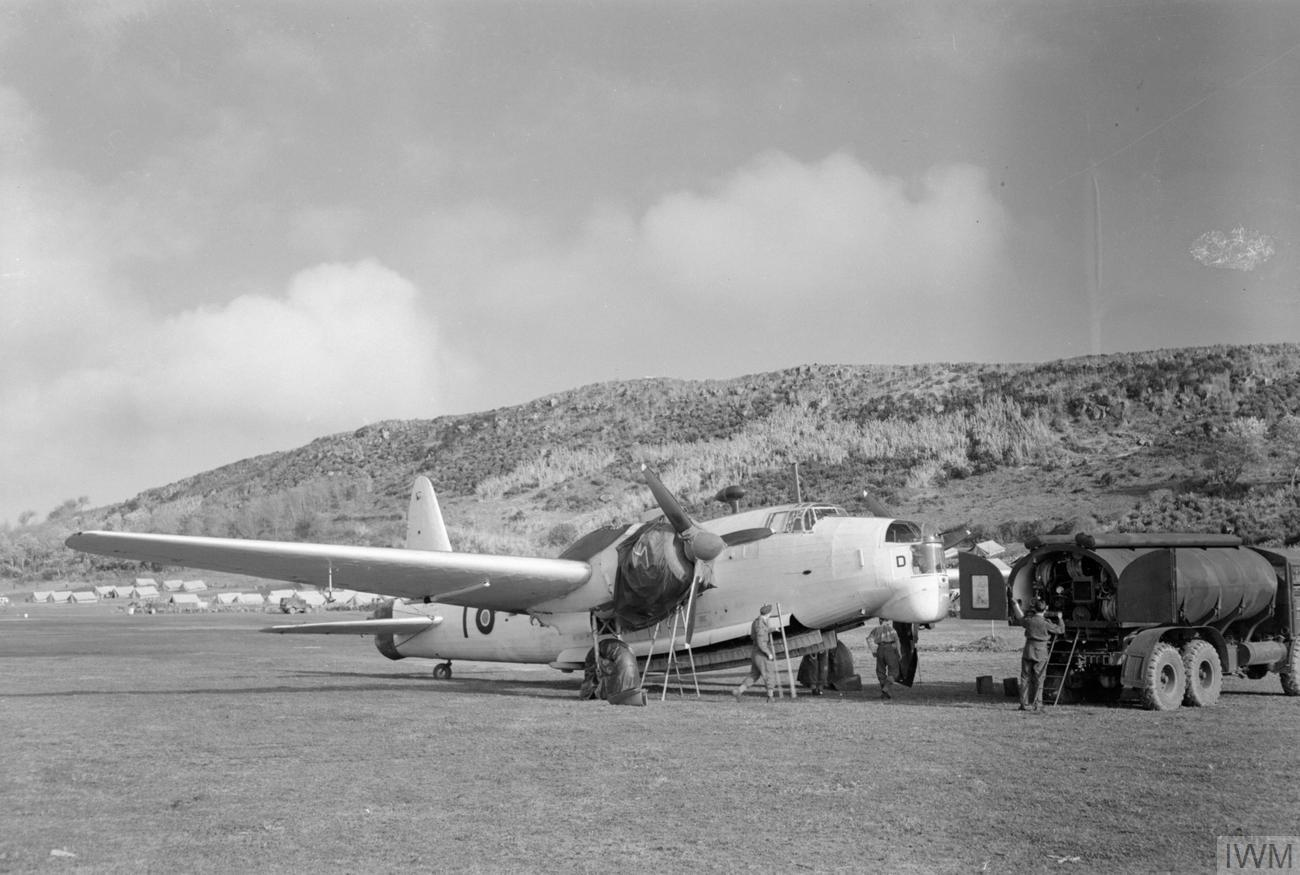
No. 247 Group in the Azores, 1943–1945. Vickers Wellington GR Mark XIV, HF197 '1-D', of No. 172 Squadron RAF Detachment, undergoing servicing at Lagens

July 1944 – HQ Azores

- Azores
  - No. 172 Squadron RAF (det) with Vickers Wellington
- RAF Lagens
  - No. 220 Squadron RAF with Boeing Fortress four-engined heavy bomber
  - No. 269 Squadron RAF with Supermarine Spitfire, Lockheed Hudson and Miles Martinet

July 1945 – HQ Azores

- Azores
  - No. 269 Squadron RAF with Supermarine Spitfire, Vickers Warwick and Miles Martinet

== Air Officer Commanding ==
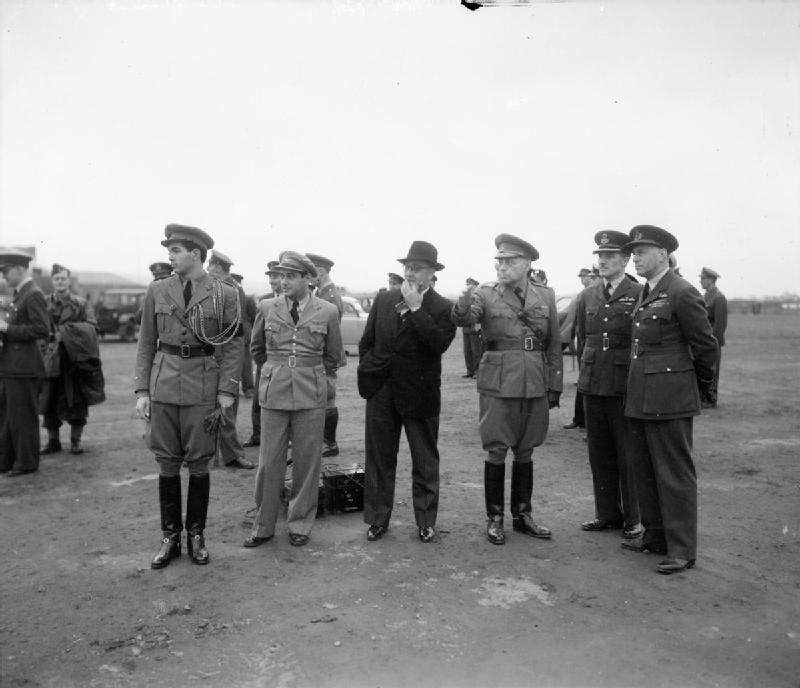
Air Vice-Marshal G R Bromet, Air Officer Commanding No. 247 Group, gives a 'green' on an Aldis lamp for the first aircraft - a Boeing Fortress Mark II - to take off, during the Anglo-Portuguese ceremony to open the new runway at Lagens. Standing next to him is the Station Commander of Lagens, Group Captain W E Oulton, and the Portuguese Military Governor of the Azores, Brigadier J Tamagnini Barbosa

Note: The ranks shown are the ranks held at the time of holding the appointment of Air Officer Commanding, No. 247 Group Royal Air Force.

- 18 September 1943 – Air Vice-Marshal Sir Geoffrey Rhodes Bromet KBE, CB, DSO, DL
- 4 June 1945 – Air Commodore Harold Southey
