= Sturley Simpson =

Royal Air Force Air Vice-Marshal (1896–1966)

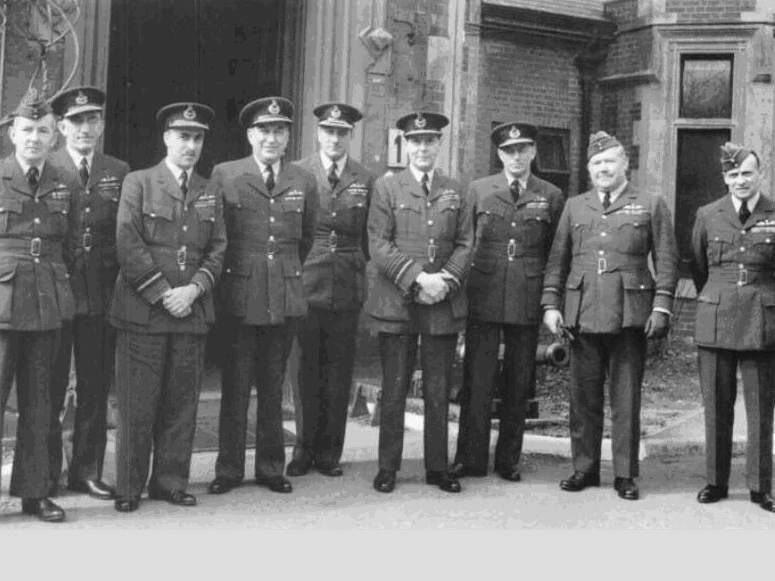
- Air Commodore Simpson, fifth from left, at RAF Coastal Command, Northwood, in March 1942
- Born: 13 June 1896
- Died: 28 April 1966 (aged 69)
- Military career
- Allegiance: United Kingdom
- Branch: British Army (1915–1918); Royal Air Force (1918–1947)
- Service years: 1915–1947
- Rank: Air vice-marshal
- Commands: No. 18 Group (1944–1947); AHQ Gibraltar (1941–1944); RAF Thornaby (1938–1941); No. 4 Squadron (1930–1933)
- Conflicts: First World War; Second World War
- Awards: Companion of the Order of the Bath; Commander of the Order of the British Empire; Military Cross; Mentioned in dispatches (2); Grand Cross of the Order of the White Lion (Czechoslovakia); War Cross (Czechoslovakia)

Air Vice Marshal Sturley Philip Simpson, CB, CBE, MC (13 June 1896 – 28 April 1966) was a senior Royal Air Force commander.

== RAF career ==
Simpson was commissioned into the Bedfordshire Regiment in 1915 during the First World War. Awarded the Military Cross in 1927, he was appointed Officer Commanding No. 4 Squadron in 1930 and Station Commander at RAF Thornaby in 1938. During the Second World War he commanded AHQ Gibraltar and then No. 18 Group. He retired in 1947.

After the Second World War Simpson was Commandant at Northolt Aerodrome.
