= RAF Gibraltar =

Royal Air Force station in Gibraltar

RAF Gibraltar
- Gibraltar
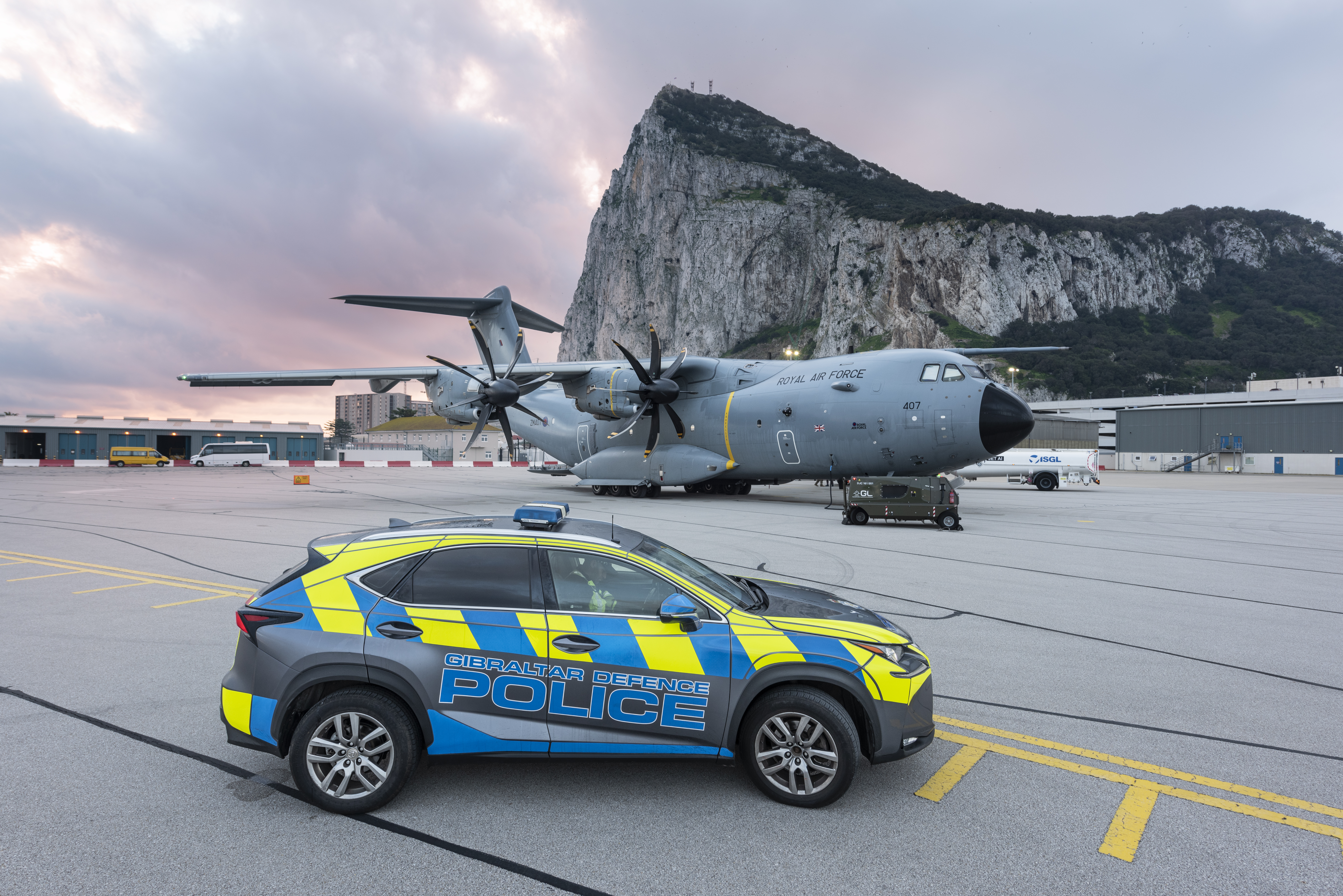
- A Royal Air Force A400M Atlas C1 and Gibraltar Defence Police vehicle at RAF Gibraltar during 2021

- Guard the Gateway

Site information
- Type: Permanent Joint Operating Base
- Owner: Ministry of Defence
- Operator: Royal Air Force
- Controlled by: British Forces Gibraltar
- Condition: Operational
- Website: Official website

Location
- Coordinates: 36°08′58″N 005°20′50″W

Site history
- Built: 1942
- In use: 1942–present

Garrison information
- Current commander: Wing Commander Rob Hall BSc Econ (Hons) MSc Econ RAF

Airfield information
- Identifiers: IATA: GIB, ICAO: LXGB, WMO: 8495
- Elevation: 3.7 metres (12 ft) AMSL
Runways
Direction	Length and surface
09/27	1,778 metres (5,833 ft) Asphalt
- Airfield shared with a civilian terminal Source: RAF Gibraltar Defence Aerodrome Manual

Royal Air Force Gibraltar or more simply RAF Gibraltar (also formerly known as North Front) is a Royal Air Force station on Gibraltar. No military aircraft are currently stationed there, but RAF and aircraft of other NATO nations will periodically arrive for transient stopovers, exercises, or other temporary duty. Administered by British Forces Gibraltar, the station is a joint civil-military facility that also functions as the Rock's civilian airport – Gibraltar Airport – with the civilian airport's passenger terminal building and apron facilities located on the north side of the runway while the apron and hangar of RAF Gibraltar are located on the south side of the runway.

A total of 16 personnel were reported assigned to RAF Gibraltar as of 2023.

== History ==
=== Early history ===
A Royal Naval Air Service seaplane base was opened at Gibraltar during the First World War.

The airport was constructed during World War II when Gibraltar was an important naval base for the British. Originally opened in 1939, it was only an emergency airfield for the Royal Navy's Fleet Air Arm. However, the runway was later extended by reclaiming some land from the Bay of Gibraltar using rock blasted from the Rock of Gibraltar while carrying out works on military tunnels. This last major extension of the runway allowed larger aircraft to land at Gibraltar. At this time the airfield completely obliterated the former Gibraltar horse racing track.

On 25 September 1939, No. 200 (Coastal) Group RAF was formed as a subordinate formation to HQ RAF Mediterranean in control of No. 202 Squadron RAF. The Group's function was the control of Royal Air Force units operating from Gibraltar. In late 1940 the Group was transferred to Coastal Command. Later a joint RN/RAF Area Combined Headquarters was formed which commenced operations in early 1942.

RAF North Front opened in 1942 and RAF New Camp opened around the same time. RAF New Camp was built on reclaimed land in the harbour next to Montagu Bastion and was the site for a slipway and hangar for flying boats and RAF motor launches.

The airfield played a major part in Operation Torch, the Anglo-American invasion of French North Africa (French colonial possessions in Algeria, Tunisia and Morocco) in November 1942.

Following the major reorganization of the Allied air forces at the Casablanca Conference in January 1943, RAF Gibraltar became a major sub-command of the Mediterranean Air Command under Air Chief Marshal Sir Arthur Tedder in February 1943.

Anti-submarine warfare was a major priority of RAF Gibraltar during the later years of the Second World War and some of their aircraft were equipped with special detectors to locate German U-boats in the relatively shallow waters around Gibraltar. United States Navy Fleet Air Wing 15 based at Port Lyautey coordinated its antisubmarine warfare operations with RAF Gibraltar and assigned a ZP-14 Squadron blimp pilot/liaison officer to Gibraltar.

=== Post-war ===
On 29 May 1945 the Area Combined Headquarters was shut down and most of the personnel sent home. Weather flights from Gibraltar were maintained at the end of the war by No. 520 Squadron RAF flying Halifaxes. This was superseded by a detachment of No. 518 Squadron RAF from Aldergrove, and then by the arrival of No. 224 Squadron RAF. Initially the squadron dispatched a detachment in May 1948, but the whole squadron moved to Gibraltar in August 1951. It was re-equipped with Avro Shackletons. The station officially became "RAF Gibraltar" in 1966.

The RAF camp, now known as Devil's Tower Camp, which was increasingly used by the British Army in the 1960s and 1970s, became the home of the Royal Gibraltar Regiment.

By the 1980s RAF Gibraltar was increasingly being used as a Forward Operating Base for middle east operations.

Partial view of RAF Gibraltar's west–east (left to right) orientation of the runway from the rock, with La Linea's harbour visible in the background. The border is to the middle-right side of the photo just below the green band.

On 4 February 2011, the new RAF headquarters in Gibraltar was officially opened by The Chief of Joint Operations, Air Marshal Sir Stuart Peach.

In 2016 a major runway resurfacing project was completed ensuring both military and civilian flights could continue.

== Units stationed ==
Order of Battle, 10 July 1943
RAF Units	Aircraft
No. 48 Squadron	Lockheed Hudson
No. 179 Squadron	Vickers Wellington
No. 202 Squadron	Consolidated Catalina
No. 210 Squadron	Catalina
No. 233 Squadron	Hudson
No. 248 Squadron Detachment	Bristol Beaufighter
No. 544 Squadron Detachment	Supermarine Spitfire
No. 813 Squadron, Fleet Air Arm	Fairey Swordfish
No. 1403 (Meteorological) Flight	Handley Page Hampden, Gloster Gladiator

== Commanding officers ==
- Air Vice-Marshal Sturley Simpson – AOC, AHQ Gibraltar, December 1941 to Feb 1944
- Air Vice Marshal William Elliot – AOC, RAF Gibraltar, Feb 1944 to June 1944
- Air Vice Marshal Alick Stevens – AOC, RAF Gibraltar, June 1944 to August 1945

== Gibraltar squadrons ==
- No. 224 Squadron RAF (Disbanded)

== Gallery ==
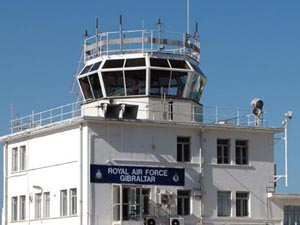
The modern day control tower of RAF Gibraltar/Gibraltar Airport

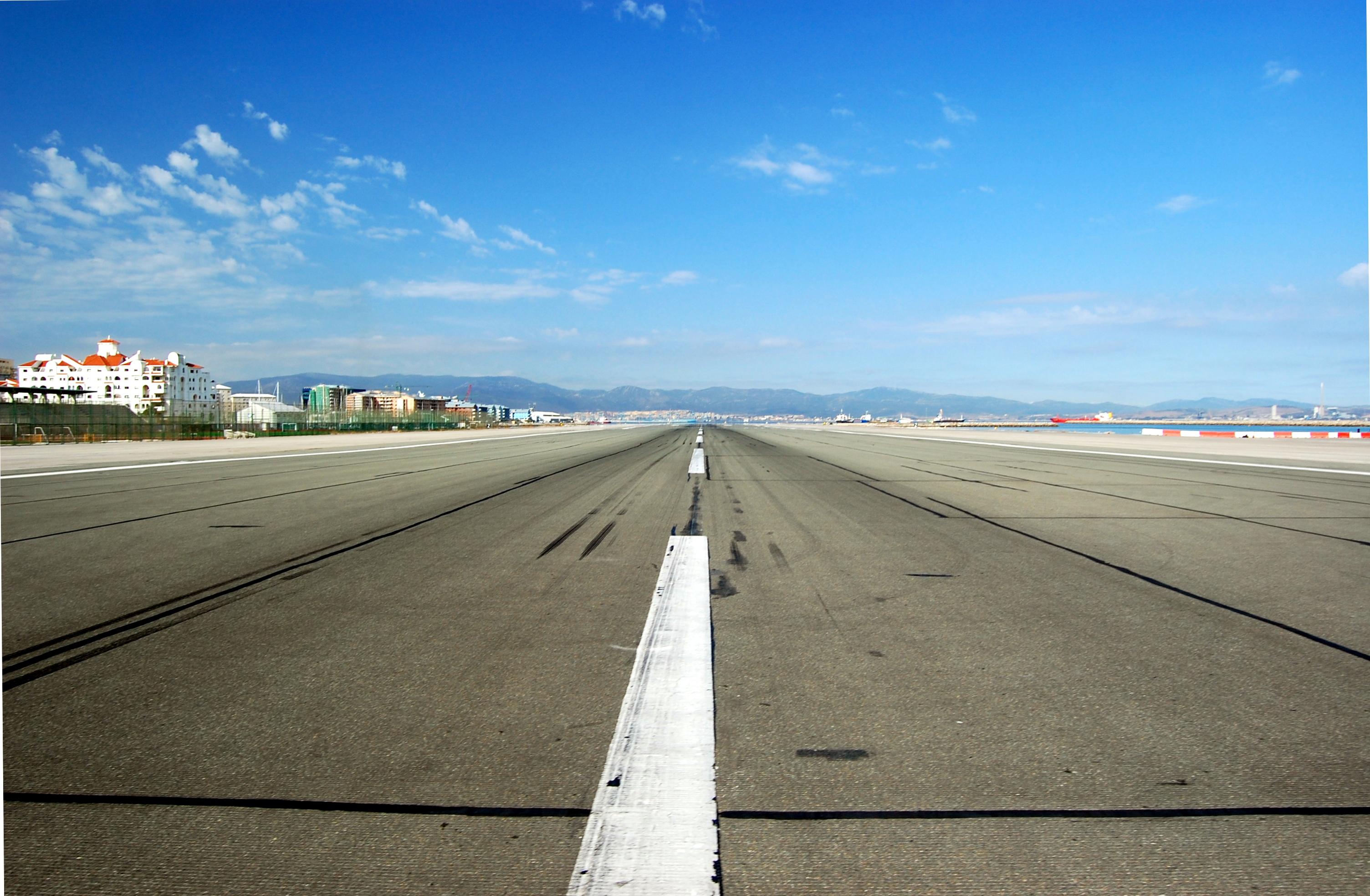
The runway of RAF Gibraltar/Gibraltar Airport looking from East to West

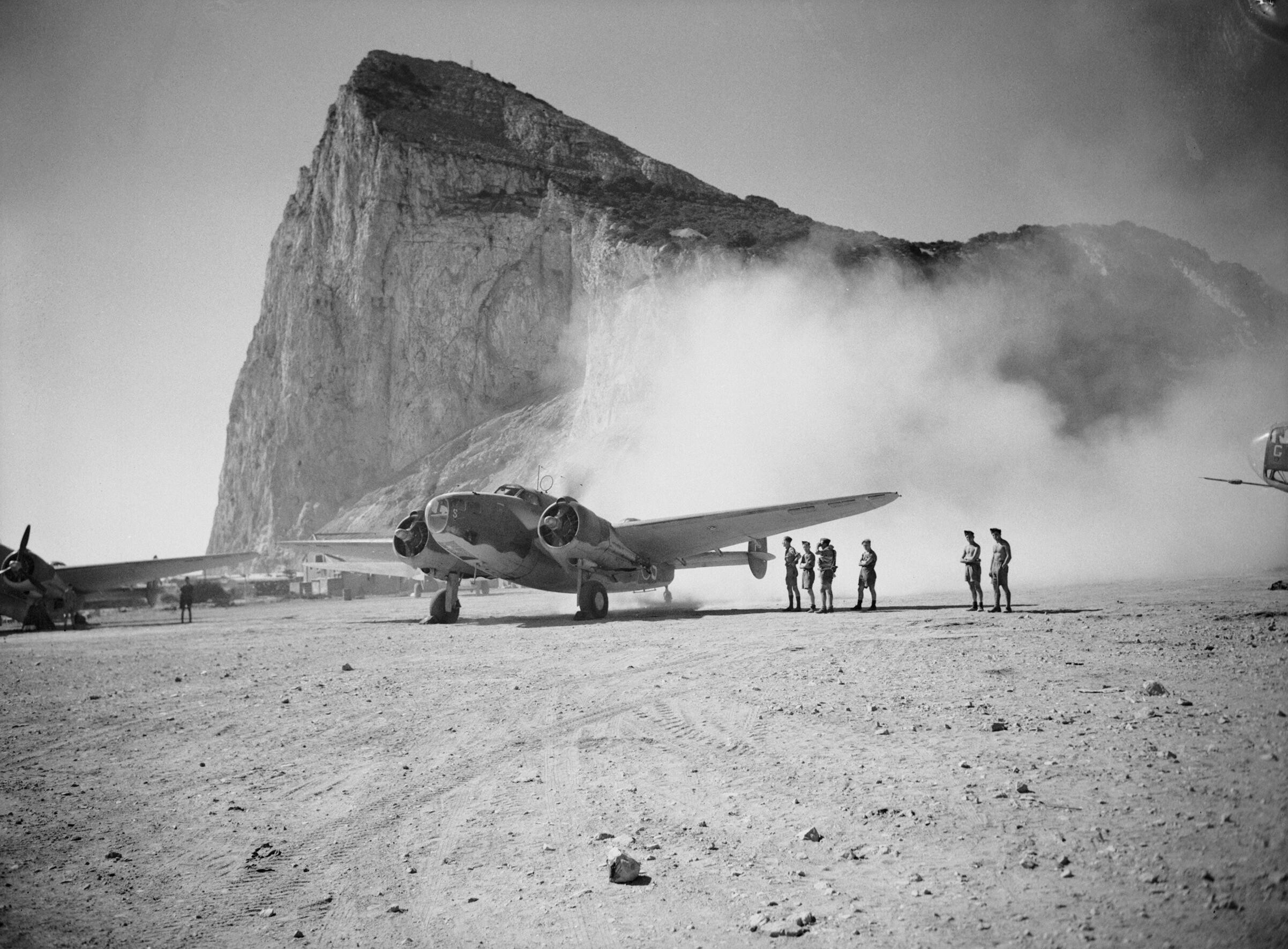
A Lockheed Hudson of No. 233 Squadron RAF leaves its dispersal at Gibraltar for a reconnaissance sortie, in August 1942.

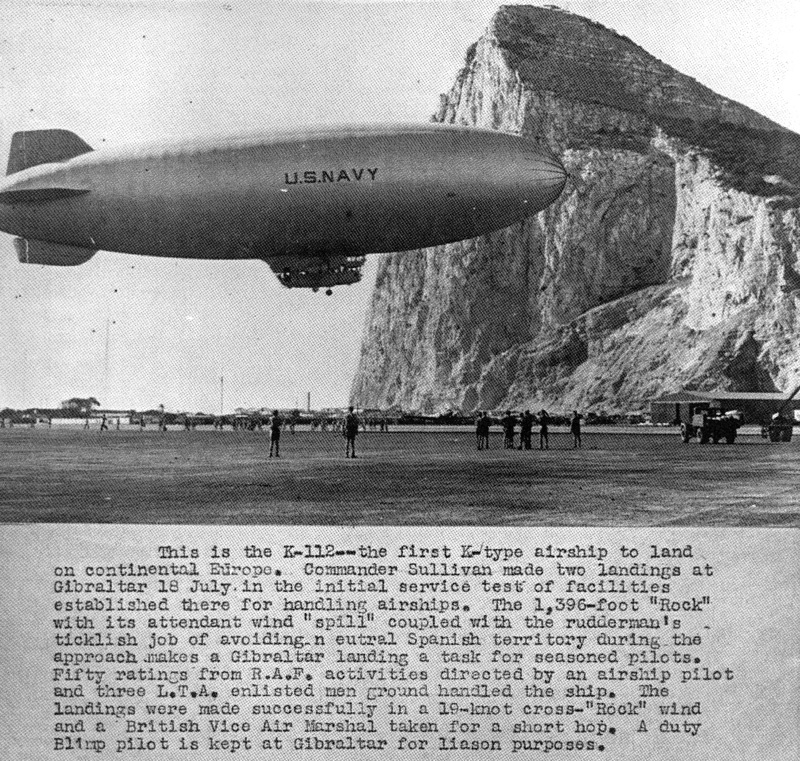
Goodyear ZNP-K ships of United States Navy Blimp Squadron ZP-14 coordinated their anti-submarine warfare operations with RAF Gibraltar in 1944.

=== Panoramic view ===
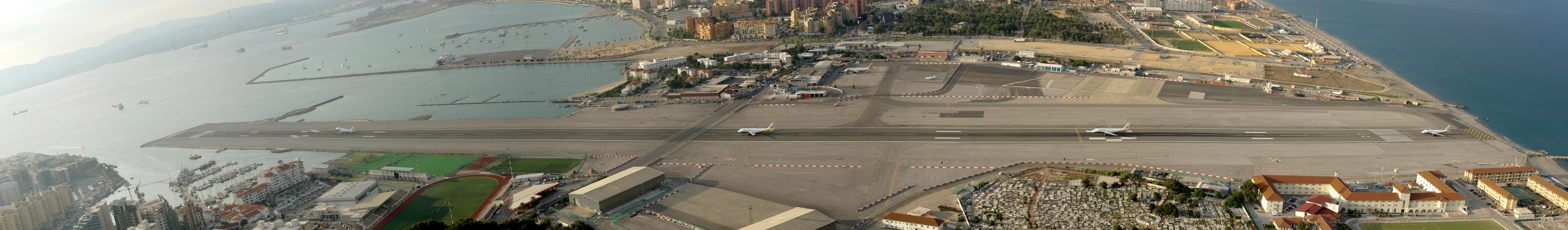
Panoramic photograph of RAF Gibraltar/Gibraltar Airport

== See also ==
- List of Royal Air Force commands
