= Central Photographic Establishment =

Former Royal Air Force photographic reconnaissance unit

Central Photographic Establishment
- Active: 15 August 1946 - 1 March 1950
- Country: United Kingdom
- Branch: Royal Air Force
- Last base: Beggarsbush House, Benson

The Central Photographic Establishment (CPE) is a former Royal Air Force unit that dealt with Photographic reconnaissance after the Second World War. It started life as No. 106 (Photographic Reconnaissance) Wing RAF on 3 July 1943. The wing was upgraded to a group on 14 April 1944 as No. 106 (Photographic Reconnaissance) Group RAF under RAF Coastal Command then on 15 August 1946 it was upgraded again to the CPE.

== History ==
The CPE was formed on 15 August 1946 at Fifield House, Benson.

History of No. 106 (Photographic Reconnaissance) Wing RAF

106 Wing was formed on 3 July 1943 at RAF Benson.

History of No. 106 (Photographic Reconnaissance) Group RAF

106 Group was formed on 14 April 1944 at Fifield House, Benson.

== See also ==
- RAF Medmenham, the main interpretation centre for photographic reconnaissance operations
- List of Royal Air Force units & establishments
