= RAF Coastal Command =

Former command of the Royal Air Force

Royal Air Force Coastal Command
- RAF Coastal Command badge
- Active: 14 July 1936 – 27 November 1969
- Country: United Kingdom
- Branch: Royal Air Force
- Role: Anti-submarine warfare Commerce raiding Aerial reconnaissance Air-sea rescue Weather reconnaissance
- Part of: Royal Air Force
- Headquarters: 1936–1939: RAF Lee-on-Solent; 1939–1969: Northwood
- Motto: Constant Endeavour
- Engagements: Second World War; Cold War
- Battle honours: Arctic 1940–1945; Atlantic 1939–1945; Baltic 1939–1945; Biscay 1940–1945; Bismarck; German Ports 1940–1945

Commanders
- Notable commanders: Air Marshal Sir Frederick Bowhill; Air Chief Marshal Sir Philip Joubert de la Ferté

RAF Coastal Command was a formation within the Royal Air Force (RAF). It was founded in 1936, when the RAF was restructured into Fighter, Bomber and Coastal commands and played an important role during the Second World War. Maritime Aviation had been neglected in the inter-war period, due to disagreements between the Royal Navy (RN) and RAF over the ownership, roles and investment in maritime air power.

The Admiralty's main concern until 1937 was the return of the Fleet Air Arm to the Royal Navy while the RAF concentrated on the development of a bombing force to provide a deterrent. Coastal Command was referred to as the "Cinderella Service" by A V Alexander, the First Lord of the Admiralty in November 1940. Soon after RAF Coastal Area was elevated to Coastal Command, its headquarters moved from Lee-on-Solent to Northwood in northwest London.

During the Second World War, Coastal Command's most important contribution was the protection of Allied convoys from attacks by the U-boats of the German Kriegsmarine. It also protected Allied shipping from aerial attacks by the Luftwaffe. The main operations of Coastal Command were defensive, defending supply lines in the Battle of the Atlantic, as well as the Mediterranean, Middle East, and African theatres. It operated from bases in the United Kingdom, Iceland, Gibraltar, the Soviet Union, West Africa and North Africa. It also had an offensive capacity; in the North Sea, Arctic, Mediterranean and Baltic, strike wings attacked German shipping carrying war materials from Italy to North Africa and from Scandinavia to Germany.

By 1943 Coastal Command finally received sufficient Very Long Range [VLR] aircraft and its operations proved decisive in the victory over the U-boats. These aircraft were Consolidated B-24 Liberators and from early 1943, these and other Coastal Command aircraft, were fitted with ASV Mark III [air-to-surface vessel] centimetric radar, the latest depth charges, including homing torpedoes, officially classed as Mark 24 mines [nicknamed 'Wandering Annie' or 'Wandering Willie'] and even rockets. The Command saw action from the first day of hostilities until the last day of the Second World War.

Coastal Command completed one million flying hours, 240,000 operations and destroyed 212 U-boats. Coastal Command casualties amounted to 2,060 aircraft to all causes. From 1940 to 1945 Coastal Command sank 366 German transport vessels and damaged 134. The total tonnage sunk was 512,330 tons and another 513,454 tons damaged. 10,663 persons were rescued by the Command, comprising 5,721 Allied crew members, 277 enemy personnel and 4,665 non-aircrews. A total of 5,866 Coastal Command personnel were killed in action. During the Cold War, Coastal Command concentrated on anti-submarine warfare preparations against the fleets of the Warsaw Pact. In 1969, Coastal Command was subsumed into the new Strike Command, which had also absorbed the former Bomber, Fighter and Signals Commands and later absorbed Air Support Command, the former Transport Command.

== Formation and neglect ==
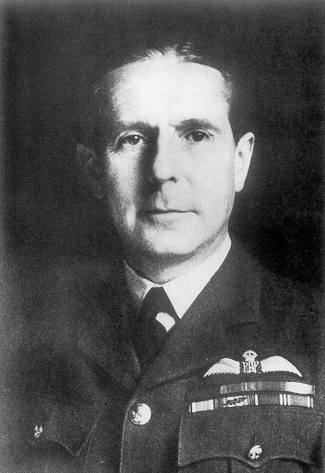
Philip Joubert de la Ferté, Coastal Command's second AOC-in-C. Joubert continually complained about the neglect of Coastal Command

In 1936, almost 18 years after the end of the First World War, there was a change in the command structure of the RAF. Several Expansion Schemes were heading at such pace to re-arm the British military in face of the Nazi threat that "Area" formations were now to be called "Commands". Fighter and Bomber Areas became Fighter and Bomber Commands and Coastal Area was renamed Coastal Command. Its headquarters was located at Lee-on-Solent. Air Marshal Sir Arthur Longmore, Air Officer Commanding (AOC) RAF Coastal Area oversaw the renaming and handed over command to Air Marshal Philip Joubert de la Ferté on 24 August 1936.

In March 1935 the threat from Nazi Germany prompted a series of expansion schemes which pushed the number of squadrons up to 163 (as per Expansion Scheme M, the last before the outbreak of war) and the number of aircraft to 2,549. The scheme was never fully implemented, and Scheme F, 124 Squadrons and 1,736 aircraft, was the only scheme that ran its full course. It did produce modern aircraft and it made adequate provision for reserves (75 per cent) but again, the bomber forces received no less than 50 per cent which averaged 57 per cent over all schemes. Maritime air units never made up more than 12 per cent of British air strength. From a pre-expansion strength of just five squadrons, four of which were flying boats, the figure of maritime squadrons rose to 18 by September 1939, with a strength of just 176 aircraft. Some 16 of these were allocated to trade defence but given Trenchard's policy (which was still in place after his retirement) of developing bombers for the maritime arm which could bolster the air offensive, most were not specialised anti-submarine warfare (ASW) aircraft. The Air Ministry was thoroughly uninterested in any aircraft which fell outside the bomber function.

Joubert was highly critical of the Air Ministry's attitude to his service. In 1937 several exercises were carried out by Coastal Command in co-operation with submarines against the Home Fleet to judge the surface fleet's defence against submarine and air attack. Despite the experiences of the First World War, no attention was paid to the problem of attacking submarines from the air as part of trade protection measures. Owing to misplaced faith in the imperfect ASDIC invention which was never intended to detect surface-running submarines, it appeared the Royal Navy no longer considered U-boats a threat to Britain's sea lanes. The Air Ministry, keen to concentrate on strategic air forces, did not dispute the Admiralty's conclusions and Coastal Command did not receive any guidance from the Air Ministry. The saving grace for both services was the construction of the Combined Headquarters which enabled rapid collaboration in maritime operations. This was one of the few successes in organisation and preparation made before the outbreak of war.

When the review of the role Coastal Command was to play in war was assessed in 1937, the AOC Sir Frederick Bowhill was informed by his Senior Air Staff Officer, Air Commodore Geoffrey Bromet, that the other two commands (Bomber and Fighter) had clear mission objectives while Coastal Command had been given no clear mandate. It was assumed that Coastal Command was to keep sea communications open for merchant shipping and prevent seaborne raids on British coastlines and ports. No mention of U-boats was made by either man. Both apparently assumed aircraft and surface raiders presented the greater threat in British waters, thus following the Admiralty line that U-boats were no longer a threat. When Admiral Sir Dudley Pound enquired about aerial assets in trade and commerce defence, Chief of the Air Staff Cyril Newall, replied that there was not enough "jam" [resources] to go around and stated it was more advisable to risk losses on trade routes than weaken the RAF's ability to protect Britain from air attack and bomb its enemies.

In March 1937, the Director of Operations, Group Captain Robert Saundby, complained that the role for Coastal Command in war, namely supporting the bomber offensive and second, the support of naval forces along the British coastline, were too limited and was in danger of diverting the Command from its main concern: ASW. In October the Deputy Chief of the Air Staff (DCAS) Air Vice Marshal Richard Peirse confirmed that there was no formal role for the service or location of its units. Peirse did reverse the decision to have strategic bombing support as the primary function. This was changed to trade defence, Coastal Command was only to be used for other purposes if trade routes were suffering little interference and the intensity of air attack on Britain, or air attacks on enemy targets, required all available air units for those purposes. In December 1937, the Naval and Air Staffs met again and changed the priority to North Sea reconnaissance. The Naval Staff insisted that surface commerce raiders presented the greatest danger and aircraft could prove decisive only in locating enemy warships. ASW remained in third place, after direct co-operation with surface fleets. In December 1938, this was changed again and ASW moved up to second priority. In August 1939 it was moved to first priority. When Coastal Command went to war, its first task was to co-operate with the Navy to prevent enemy vessels from escaping into the North Sea and Atlantic Oceans. Secondly, it was to provide ASW support where and when it could. These steps are significant as the language indicates a change from passive reconnaissance of enemy warships and submarines to an active directive which involved the attack of the vessels by Coastal Command aircraft.

Since the late 1920s the tension between the air and naval services had declined. It arose briefly again in 1937 when the question of the FAA operational control arose. On this occasion the British Government sided with the Admiralty. Despite a spirited defence of its asset, once the Minister for Co-ordination of Defence, Sir Thomas Inskip had decided to transfer the arm, the Air Ministry was content to let the matter rest. Any threat to the Air Ministry's existence had long since passed; budgetary constraint and the reluctance to engage in another battle which would waste resources were also factors in the Air Ministry's decision not to contest the issue further. Inter-service squabbling assured maritime aviation's stagnation, especially in shore-based elements. Virtually no co-operation existed in the area of research and development. In the case of Coastal Command, it continued to come third in the Air Ministry's list of priorities, after Fighter and Bomber Commands, well into the late 1930s.

== Second World War ==
=== Early war ===
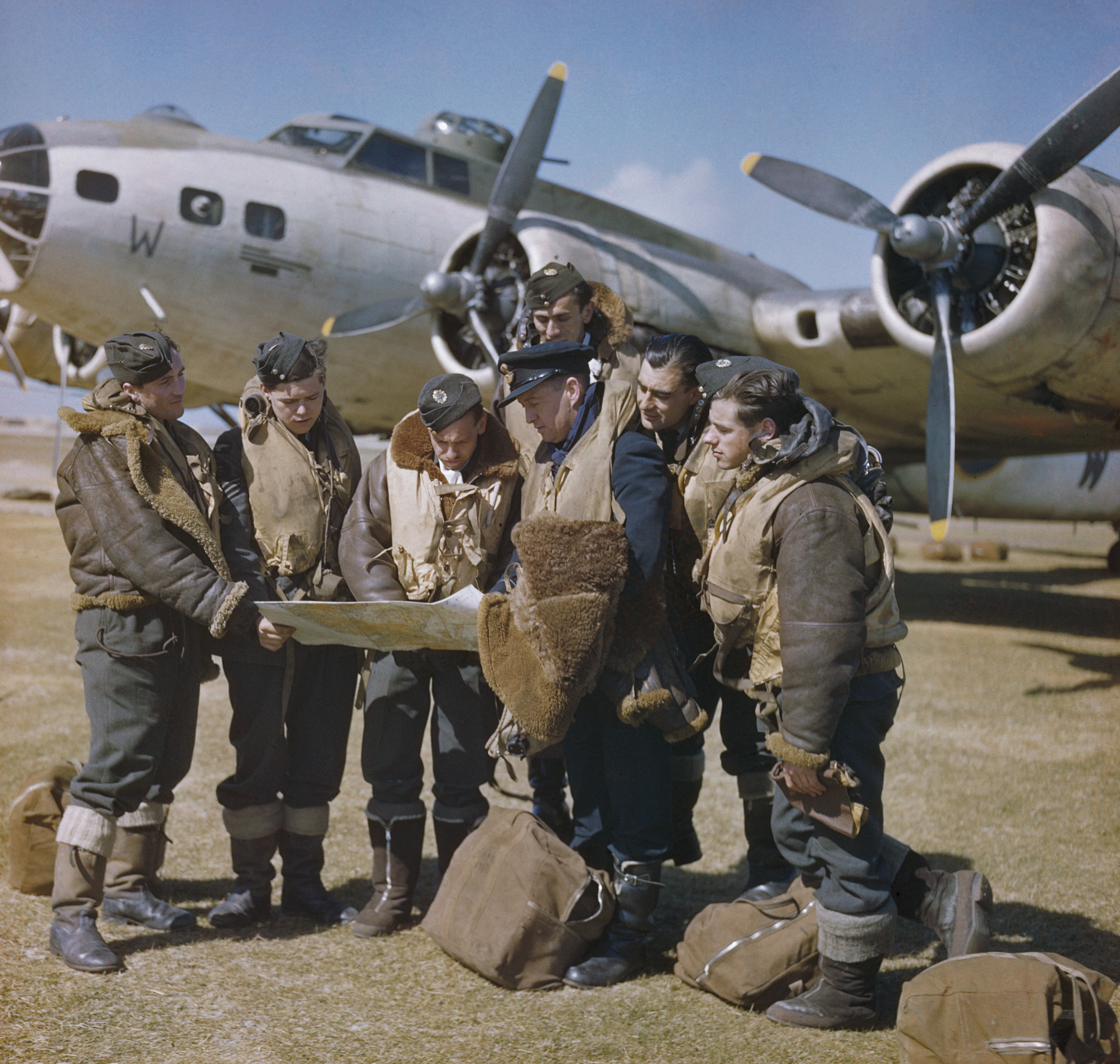
RAF Coastal Command crew holding a final conference before taking off in their Boeing B-17, from Lajes Field on Terceira Island in the Azores, 1943

From its formation in 1936, Coastal Command did not receive the support it required to be an effective naval air service. In September 1939 Nazi Germany invaded Poland beginning the war in Europe. The Command's position was comfortable for the first nine months of the war, the period known as the Phoney War. German submarines were not able to reach the Atlantic unless they undertook a dangerous transit journey through the North Sea and around Britain's northern waters or through the English Channel, which was guarded by the Royal and French Navies. The powerful French Navy was responsible for covering half of the Atlantic shipping routes and thus contributed half of the Allied forces available.

The events of April to June 1940 overturned the balance of naval and air power, as the Germans conquered Denmark, Norway, The Netherlands, Belgium and France. The occupation of these countries permitted the Luftwaffe and Kriegsmarine to operate from French ports on the Atlantic coast, hundreds of miles closer to the Atlantic shipping lanes. German medium bombers could also reach British ports on the westernmost and northernmost coasts. The advantage enjoyed by the Germans, allowed them to interdict merchant shipping supplying food and war materials to Britain much more effectively, which had the potential to starve Britain. While merchant shipping was suffering these losses, Coastal Command had proven ineffective at countering German air and sea attacks on shipping. But the command could not protect English Channel convoys, and was forced to abandon operations until July 1940. RAF Fighter Command was given the task, supplying air attack and defence with the enemy. Warning signs after the First World War, that U-boats could become a serious threat once again, meant that aircraft would be the best counter to their operations. This fact not being fully understood, Coastal Command became the "Cinderella service" until about 1943.

The situation would not improve until 1942. Coastal Command did operate with effect alongside RAF Bomber Command in disrupting enemy shipping during the Battle of Britain in 1940. Coastal Command attacked shipping and mined waters around invasion ports. The German invasion of Britain in 1940, Operation Sea Lion, was eventually cancelled owing to the German defeat in the Battle of Britain.

During the first three years of the Second World War, Coastal Command and the Admiralty fought a battle with the RAF and Air Ministry over the primacy of trade defence, in relation to the bomber effort against mainland Germany, a strategic tussle which conceivably could have cost the Western Alliance the Battle of the Atlantic. The Air Staff and Bomber Command enjoyed the backing of Churchill and the maritime air effort struggled to receive the recognition it needed. On the outbreak of war, the order of battle listed just 298 aircraft, of which only 171 were operational. On 15 February 1941, Coastal Command was placed under the operational control of the Admiralty. Instrumental in improving the strike rate against submarines was scientific advisor and assistant director of research E. J. Williams, who applied scientific analysis to the logistical problems to great effect. Williams was present at some meetings of the Cabinet Anti-U-boat Committee at 10 Downing Street, under the chairmanship of the Prime Minister.

Owing to the starvation of resources, even as late as March 1943, the Atlantic supply lines were being threatened. This situation arose as a direct result of the lack of very long-range aircraft. Despite the enormous losses of the disastrous 1940–1942 period, known to the Germans as the "First" and "Second Happy Time", the Air Ministry refused to invest in trade defence. Further delays in resource procurement might have led to German success, which could have defeated Britain and forced it out of the war or at least caused a postponement of Operation Torch, the Allied landings in French North-West Africa in 1942 and Operation Overlord, the landing in France, in 1944. Other research indicates that losses unquestionably affected the build-up for Operation Neptune, the naval phase of the landings in Europe.

=== Mid and later war ===
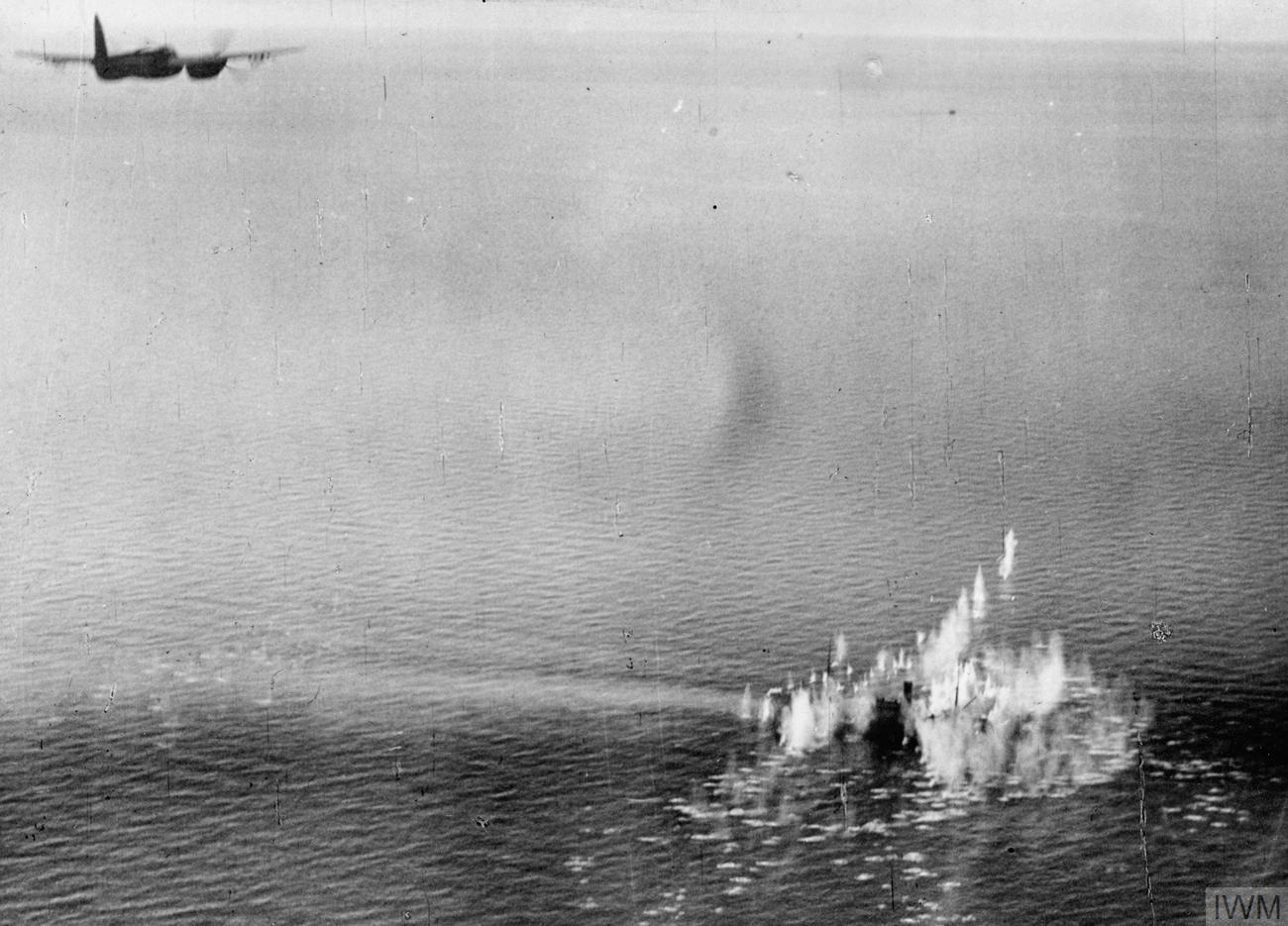
A De Havilland Mosquito of the RAF Banff Strike Wing attacking a convoy evacuating German troops from Kattegat on 5 April 1945. A flak ship and a trawler were sunk

Eventually the Command was given the investment it needed. Radar and long-range aircraft enabled the Command to hunt and destroy U-boats with growing efficiency. German submarines had been sinking a large number of Allied ships in the Atlantic Gap, which was a stretch of water in the central Atlantic beyond the range of most Allied aircraft. The covering of the gap by very-long-range aircraft equipped with radar helped reduce the effectiveness of U-boats. In May 1943 the campaign reached a peak, when a large number of U-boats were sunk with little loss to Allied shipping; Coastal Command had gained the initiative and it was known by the Germans as Black May. Thereafter the suppression of German submarines was effective in the Atlantic and in their transit routes through the Bay of Biscay in 1942, 1943 and 1944. In June 1944 the Normandy landings and subsequent Operation Overlord liberated France and cost the Germans their air and submarine bases won in 1940. The U-boats were forced to relocate to Norway and Germany in August, restoring many of the difficulties faced by the Kriegsmarine in 1939 and early 1940. The entire strategic position, which had been the foundation of the U-boat war since June 1940 had been undermined.

In the last three years of the war, Coastal Command sank more U-boats than any other service and continued to hold the technological advantage from 1943. A brief threat, in the shape of the German Type XXI submarine emerged but was too late to alter the course of the war. Technological answers to the Type XXI were available in the form of 3-centimetre radar and magnetic anomaly detectors in aircraft. At midnight 4 June 1945, official wartime operations ceased. The last mission was flown by Wing Commander J. Barret DFC, commanding officer of No. 201 Squadron RAF. By that time over 2,000 decorations had been awarded. These included four Victoria Crosses, of whom only one survived the war, 17 George Medals, and 82 Distinguished Service Orders.

== Cold War ==
=== Beginnings ===
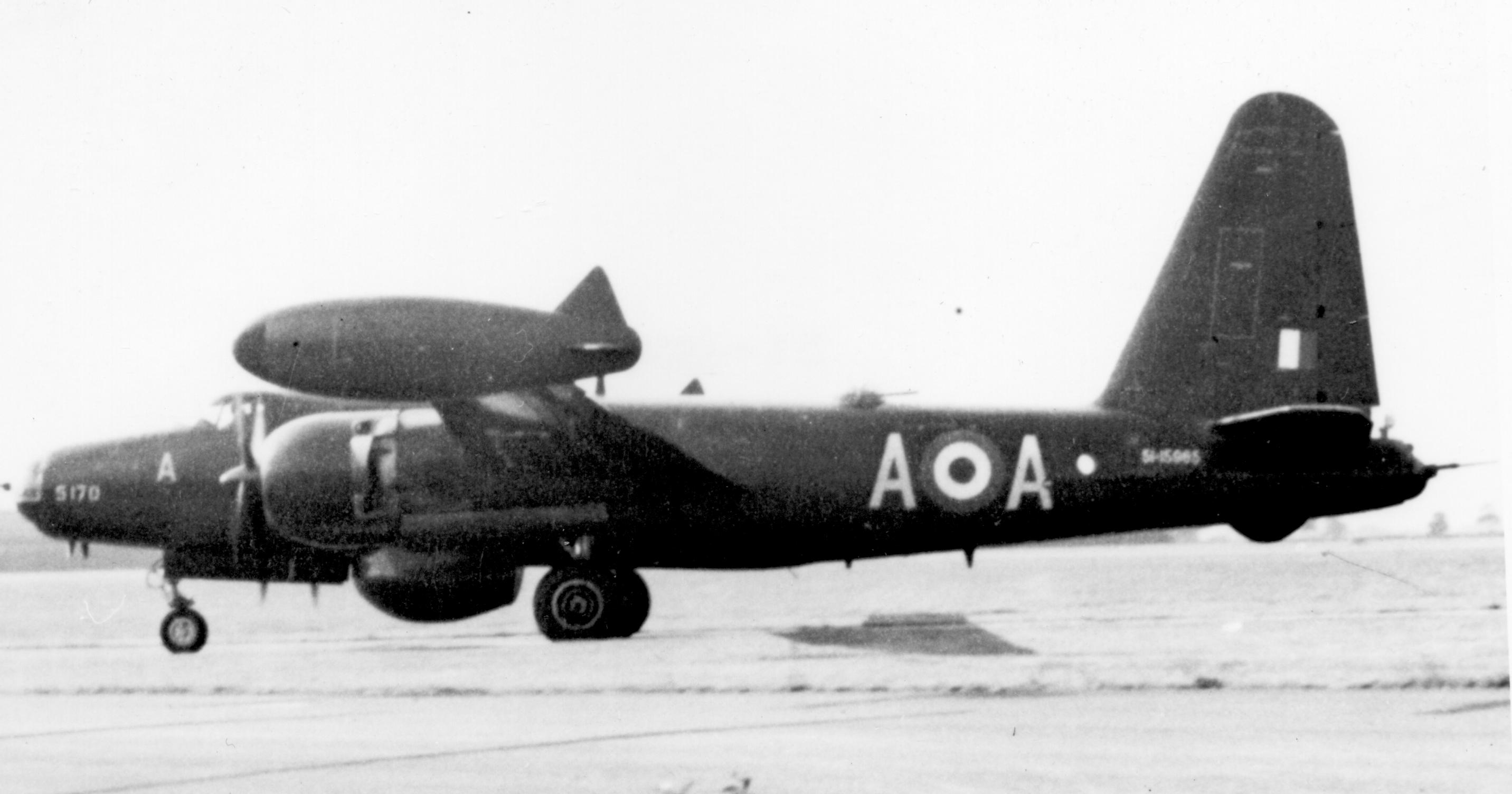
A Neptune MR1 of 217 Sqn Coastal Command RAF in 1953

The capitulation of Germany in May 1945 was followed by a rapid rundown of Coastal Command with the immediate disbandment of combat units and the transfer of aircraft to the RAF Transport Command. Commonwealth personnel were also sent home and the powerful Bristol Beaufighter and de Havilland Mosquito wings were reduced. The Command still maintained strong air-sea-rescue Air-sea rescue (ASR) and reconnaissance forces but its ASW was lopsided. With a few exceptions, only a handful of squadrons with ASW aircraft remained by January 1946.

While the Command retained a minimum peacetime force and the Air Ministry had every intention of maintaining it as such, the fleet was further reduced and suffered from procurement problems. The Short Shetland and Short Seaford were rejected as replacements for the Consolidated B-24 Liberator. A maritime version of the promising Avro Lincoln had yet to be ordered by the time the Lend-Lease programme ended in August 1945. The Short Sunderland was forced to continue as the main operational type until the end of 1946. Most of the aircraft that operated in the command were the Second World War types; the Spitfire, Lancaster, Mosquito and Beaufighter.

The Command was kept busy in the late 1940s. Units were sent to the Middle East and Palestine as part of an air policing policy, in co-operation with the Israeli Air Force and Egyptian Air Force to prevent conflict between the two countries owing to the formation of the state of Israel in 1948. While there, they undertook a major operation, Operation Bobcat, to prevent illegal Jewish migrants coming into Palestine. In May 1948 the variety of aircraft was reduced despite increasing demand for operations. In May, Palestinians began attacking British military installations throughout the region. In the largest British post-war action, Operation Dawn (13 to 14 May 1948) was launched with the support of Coastal Command.

On 28 June 1948 Coastal Command was also involved in the Berlin Airlift. The Soviet Union attempted to cut off all aid to the city which was jointly occupied by the four major powers, the Soviets in the east, and the Americans, French and British in the west. The joint American-British operation continued for almost a year. Coastal Command aircraft were involved as flying boats were the only aircraft with internal anti-corrosion treatment allowing bulk salt to be transported. The Command's operations grew in intensity. By 13 July daily sorties had risen to 16. By October it was 214 sorties (other RAF Commands were also flying in supplies). The flying boats made their flight in using the Elbe river, but these operations came to a close on 14 December 1948, when the hazard from uncharted sandbanks and wreckage which, in some cases had been deliberately placed there by the Soviets to prevent the Western Allies from supplying the city, made operations impractical. Over 1,000 sorties had been made, and 4,500 tons of supplies were flown in and 1,113 people, mainly children, evacuated.

=== Soviet threat ===
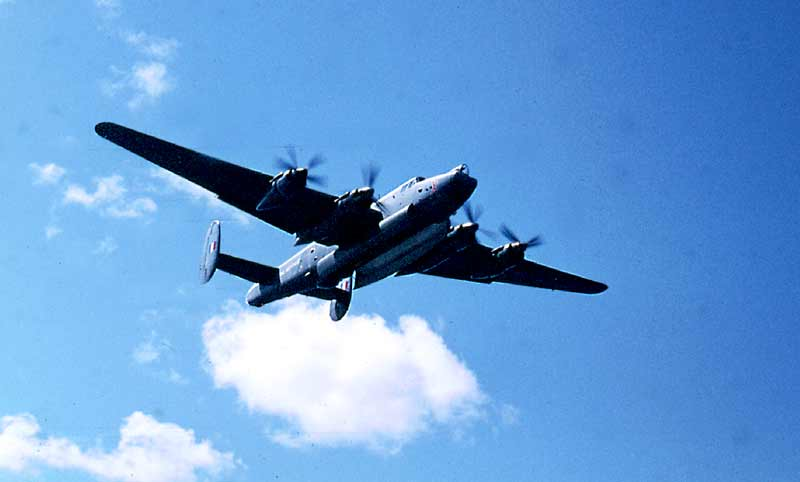
Avro Shackleton, the mainstay of Coastal Command in the 1950s.

NATO, the North Atlantic Treaty Organisation, began preparations for a military defence of Western Europe by incorporating most West European nations into a defence pact against alleged Soviet aggression in April 1951. This led to the militarisation of West Germany in 1955 and was met with the militarisation of East Germany soon after and its merger into the Warsaw Pact alliance with the Soviet Union. The purpose of Coastal Command was to help bolster the defence and guard against a potential Soviet naval threat in Atlantic and European waters. For Coastal Command the main concern was the Atlantic. On 1 March 1950 it had lost the photo reconnaissance units to RAF Bomber Command. The transfer was not complete when North Korea invaded South Korea beginning the Korean War. Handley Page Hastings were hastily modified and ready for operations but were not sent, owing to the need for ASW aircraft in the Eastern Atlantic.

The Avro Shackleton was the main operational aircraft in the 1950s, replacing the wartime Liberator GRs, along with the Neptune MR.1s. At the end of August 1951, No. 201 Squadron RAF became the first unit to complete training on the type. In mid-1953 the order of battle consisted of eight Shackleton squadrons; one at Gibraltar, four covering the South-Western Approaches in the Atlantic and three more covering the North-Western Approaches. This force numbered 64 aircraft. A further four Sunderland squadrons with 20 aircraft were split between the North-Western and South-Western Approaches. The Neptunes, numbering 32 aircraft in four squadrons, covered the North-Eastern and Eastern Approaches. The Helicopter also joined Coastal Command. Bristol Sycamores entered service in 1953 and 16 aircraft were dispersed in Britain for ASW. In March the Avro Lancaster was finally phased out of Coastal Command service.

The Command was too expensive to maintain and cost cuts were made during the 1950s which caused a reduction in strength. By mid-1957 the Command had been cut to 82 aircraft. By mid-1958 it had shrunk to just 67. The Shackletons dominated the core of this force, numbering 54 aircraft. The Neptune was cut from the service altogether, beginning on 31 August 1956. There was little operational action for the Command at this point. It airlifted British Army forces into Egypt during the Suez Crisis which was its major action during this period. The lack of funds and any active conventional military role saw the Command struggle to keep its front-line strength high. There was a brief alert in October 1962, during the Cuban Missile Crisis, when all six squadrons it then possessed were put on high alert, but nothing came of the crisis, although the Shackleton squadrons at RAF Ballykelly were sent to Macrihanish as it was known that Ballykelly was on the Soviet IRBM target list.

In the early 1960s the Soviet Navy and Communist Bloc's fishing fleets began operating around the British Isles in increasing numbers. The British public began taking an interest in their operations as civilian fisherman began complaining about their presence. Operation Chacewater began, in which Coastal Command began monitoring their movements, in particular other vessels that loitered in areas covering the arrival and departure routes for Royal Navy nuclear submarine forces. Soon after, counter operations such as Operation Adjutant were carried out, which was aimed at searching for Soviet submarines. The main threat from the Soviets in the Atlantic came from the Soviet Northern Fleet and in early 1965 most of the Command's units were concentrated in No. 18 Group RAF, based in Scotland to monitor their activities. No recorded confrontation took place between Coastal Command and Soviet naval forces during this time, although both the Shackletons from RAF Ballykelly and frigates from Londonderry would 'ping' the Soviet submarines carrying out surveillance off the mouth of Lough Foyle. In at least one instance, a Ballykelly-based Shackleton lost its radome when making a mock attack on the Russian sub.

In 1969 the special-purpose Hawker-Siddeley Nimrod, based on the de Havilland Comet airliner, was introduced into RAF service and Coastal Command duties were passed on to general squadrons. The Nimrod was a replacement for the Shackleton and it began to do so on 2 October 1969. Less than eight weeks later, Coastal Command was disbanded and ceased to exist on 27 November 1969, when it was subsumed into RAF Strike Command.

== Organisation ==
- No. 15 (Reconnaissance) Group - 1939 to 1945
- No. 16 (Reconnaissance) Group - 1936 to 1946
- No. 17 (Training) Group - 1936 to 1945
- No. 18 (Reconnaissance) Group - 1938 to 1969
- No. 19 (Reconnaissance) Group - 1941 to 1969
- No. 106 (Photo Reconnaissance) Group - from April 1944, disbanding in 1946
- No. 200 (Coastal) Group RAF - 1940 to 1942
- No. 247 (Reconnaissance) Group - 1943 - 1946
- RAF Iceland - 1941 - 1945

== Commanders in Chief ==
The following officers commanded the service:

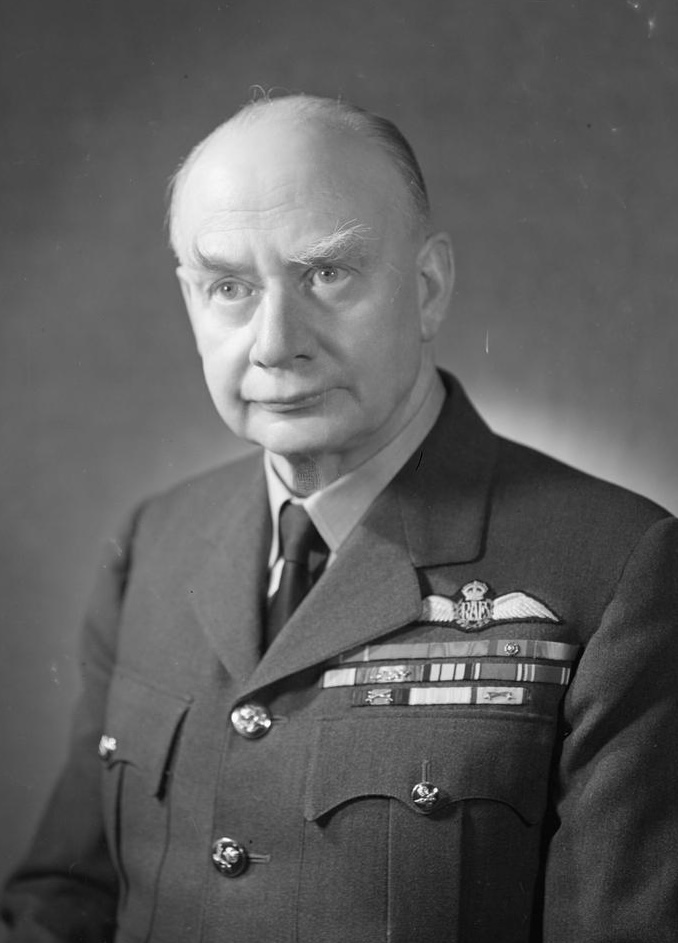
Frederick Bowhill was the longest serving C-in-C, serving three years and ten months.

| Name | From | To |
|---|---|---|
| Air Marshal Sir Arthur Longmore | 14 July 1936 | 1 September 1936 |
| Air Marshal Sir Philip Joubert de la Ferté | 1 September 1936 | 18 August 1937 |
| Air Marshal Sir Frederick Bowhill | 18 August 1937 | 14 June 1941 |
| Air Chief Marshal Sir Philip Joubert de la Ferté | 14 June 1941 | 5 February 1943 |
| Air Marshal Sir John Slessor | 5 February 1943 | 20 January 1944 |
| Air Chief Marshal Sir William Sholto Douglas | 20 January 1944 | 30 June 1945 |
| Air Marshal Sir Leonard Slatter | 30 June 1945 | 1 November 1948 |
| Air Marshal Sir John Baker | 1 November 1948 | 1 January 1950 |
| Air Marshal Sir Charles Steele | 1 January 1950 | 8 June 1951 |
| Air Marshal Sir Alick Stevens | 8 June 1951 | 8 November 1953 |
| Air Marshal Sir John Boothman | 15 November 1953 | 5 April 1956 |
| Air Marshal Sir Brian Reynolds | 5 April 1956 | 1 June 1959 |
| Air Marshal Sir Edward Chilton | 1 June 1959 | 10 August 1962 |
| Air Marshal Sir Anthony Selway | 10 August 1962 | 22 January 1965 |
| Air Marshal Sir Paul Holder | 22 January 1965 | 2 September 1968 |
| Air Marshal Sir John Lapsley | 2 September 1968 | 28 November 1969 |

== Depiction in film ==
The work of Coastal Command was immortalised in a 1942 wartime propaganda documentary named Coastal Command with a score by Ralph Vaughan Williams.

== See also ==
- List of Royal Air Force commands

| Preceded by Coastal Area | Coastal Command; 1936–1969 | Succeeded by Strike Command |
