= No. 18 Group RAF =

Former Royal Air Force operations group

- Royal Air Force Ensign
- Active: 1 April 1918 – 18 October 1919; 1 September 1938 – 1 April 1996
- Country: United Kingdom
- Branch: Royal Air Force
- Type: Royal Air Force group
- Part of: RAF Coastal Command (1938–1969); RAF Strike Command (1969–1994)
- Headquarters: RAF Pitreavie Castle; Northwood Headquarters
- Motto: Constant Endeavour
- Engagements: First World War: European theatre of World War II; Battle of the Atlantic

No. 18 Group (18 Gp) of the Royal Air Force was a group active from 1918 to 1919, and from 1938 to 1996.

== History ==
The Group was initially formed on 1 April 1918 in No. 4 Area RAF. It was transferred to North-Eastern Area RAF on 8 May 1918. Disbanded 18 October 1919.

=== 1938–1945 ===
The group was reformed on 1 September 1938 as No. 18 (Reconnaissance) Group of Coastal Command for operations with the Royal Navy's Commander-in-Chief, Rosyth and the Orkney & Shetlands Naval Command. Its headquarters were established at Rosyth.

Of the three groups forming Coastal Command's planned dispositions on the outbreak of war, 18 Group was the only one with a fully operational Navy/Air Force Area Combined Headquarters (ACHQ). It covered much of the North Sea and areas to the north and west of Scotland, north of a line running north west from the Mull of Kintyre.

=== 1946–1996 ===
By October 1946, after the war ended, it was headquartered at RAF Pitreavie Castle and its front-line strength consisted of Nos 120 and 203 Squadrons operating from RAF Leuchars flying Avro Lancaster GR.3s. By 1954 its strength had grown to five squadrons of Avro Shackletons, and Lockheed Neptunes (Nos 120, 204, 217, 240, and 269) at RAF Ballykelly, RAF Kinloss, and RAF Aldergrove as well as No. 202 Squadron RAF flying Handley Page Hastings on meteorological reconnaissance missions from RAF Aldergrove.

With the advent of Strike Command the former 18 Group became the Northern Maritime Air Region, and Coastal Command was renamed 18 Group, both changes happening on 28 November 1969. Within Strike Command the new group's title was No. 18 (Maritime) Group. From that point the Group commander held the NATO post of Commander, Maritime Air, Eastern Atlantic, reporting to CinC, Eastern Atlantic at the Northwood Headquarters in London. The Group commander also held the corresponding post within the NATO Allied Command Channel, and for that reason was a rank higher (Air Marshal) than those commanding other RAF groups.

The Hawker Siddeley Nimrod entered service in late 1970 and early 1971, initially with four squadrons of six aircraft, 120, 201, and 206 at Kinloss and 42 at RAF St Mawgan. Elements also went to Malta; No. 203 Squadron disbanding there at RAF Luqa in 1977 while flying Nimrods. The Kinloss Wing spent thousands of hours tracking Soviet submarines of the Northern Fleet, often after they had been detected by NATO submarines or the Lockheed P-3 Orions of the Royal Norwegian Air Force. Keeping track of the submarines was made easier by the aid of SOSUS acoustic listening devices on the sea bed. Also part of the force were Westland Sea King helicopters, flying for a long period in the SAR role with No. 22 and 202 Squadrons.

Blackburn Buccaneers joined the Group in the mid 1970s, and with the retirement of the final Royal Navy Buccaneers in December 1978, Nos 12, 208, and 216 Squadrons began to operate them at RAF Honington, before shifting north to RAF Lossiemouth from July 1980. No. 216 Squadron however disbanded as a Buccaneer unit in late 1980 due to a shortage of airframes following the discovery of fatigue cracks.

In 1985 other units of the Group were Nos 51, 100, and 360 Squadrons at RAF Wyton, as well as No. 231 OCU carrying out Canberra operational conversion at the same station.

The Group was disbanded by being merging with No 11 Group on 1 April 1996 to form No. 11/18 Group RAF.

=== Structure in 1989 ===
- Commander No. 18 Group RAF / Maritime Air Eastern Atlantic / Maritime Air Force Channel (MAIREASTLANT) / (MAIREASTLANT)
  - Commander Maritime Air Northern Sub-Area / Maritime Air Nore Sub-Area Channel (MAIRNORLANT) / (MAIRNORECHAN) based in Rosyth
    - RAF Kinloss
      - No. 120 Squadron RAF with 8 Nimrod MR.2 maritime patrol aircraft
      - No. 201 Squadron RAF with 8 Nimrod MR.2 maritime patrol aircraft
      - No. 206 Squadron RAF with 8 Nimrod MR.2 maritime patrol aircraft
    - RAF Lossiemouth
      - No. 8 Squadron RAF with 12 Avro Shackleton AEW.2s airborne early warning aircraft
      - No. 12 Squadron RAF with 12 Buccaneer S.2B attack aircraft (Note: Unit had a nuclear strike role and had twelve British WE.177 tactical nuclear bombs.)
      - No. 208 Squadron RAF with 12 Buccaneer S.2B attack aircraft (Note: Unit had a nuclear strike role and had twelve British WE.177 tactical nuclear bombs.)
      - No. 237 Operational Conversion Unit RAF with 16 Buccaneer S.2B attack aircraft
  - Commander Maritime Air Central Sub-Area / Maritime Air Plymouth Sub-Area Channel (MAIRCENTLANT) / (MAIRPLYMCHAN) based in Plymouth
    - RAF St Mawgan
      - No. 42 Squadron RAF with 8 Nimrod MR.2 maritime patrol aircraft
      - No. 236 Operational Conversion Unit RAF with 3 Nimrod MR.2 maritime patrol aircraft
    - RAF Wyton
      - No. 51 Squadron RAF with 3 Nimrod R.1 signals intelligence aircraft
      - No. 100 Squadron RAF with 12 Canberra T.17 electronic warfare training aircraft
      - No. 360 Squadron RAF with 12 Canberra electronic warfare training aircraft
      - No. 231 Operational Conversion Unit RAF with Canberra medium bombers

== Commanders ==
The following men were the Air Officers Commanding (AOC) of No. 18 Group:

=== 1 April 1918 to 18 October 1919 ===
- 1 April 1918 Colonel H A Williamson

=== 1 September 1938 to 1 April 1996 ===
- 27 September 1938 Air Commodore Charles Breese
- 24 March 1941 Air Vice-Marshal Reginald Marix
- 10 February 1942 Air Vice-Marshal Albert Durston
- 25 January 1943 Air Vice-Marshal Aubrey Ellwood
- 22 February 1944 Air Vice-Marshal Sturley Simpson
- January 1947 Air Vice-Marshal Edgar McCloughry
- 17 June 1948 Air Vice-Marshal David Carnegie
- 1 November 1950 Air Vice-Marshal Harold Lydford
- 29 September 1952 Air Vice-Marshal R L Ragg
- 1 April 1955 Air Vice-Marshal P D Cracroft
- 29 September 1958 Air Vice-Marshal Anthony Selway
- 7 July 1961 Air Vice-Marshal R B Thomson
- 15 February 1963 Air Vice-Marshal K V Garside
- 25 September 1965 Air Vice-Marshal Sandy Johnstone
- 1 October 1968 Air Vice-Marshal Desmond Hughes
- 28 November 1969 Air Marshal Sir Robert Craven
- 19 February 1972 Air Marshal Sir Anthony Heward
- 3 March 1973 Air Marshal Sir Douglas Lowe
- 18 September 1975 Air Marshal Sir Robert Freer
- 30 September 1978 Air Marshal Sir Philip Lagesen
- 10 May 1980 Air Marshal Sir John Curtiss
- 31 March 1983 Air Marshal Sir John Fitzpatrick
- 21 March 1986 Air Marshal Sir Barry Duxbury
- 25 October 1989 Air Marshal Sir Michael Stear
- 1 May 1992 Air Marshal Sir John Harris
