= No. 29 Group RAF =

Former Royal Air Force flying training group

No. 29 (Flying Training) Group RAF ~~No. 29 (Operations) Group RAF~~ ~~No. 29 (Training) Group RAF~~
- Royal Air Force Ensign
- Active: October 1918 until November 1918; 27 November 1918 until 31 March 1922; 1 July 1942 until 7 January 1945
- Country: United Kingdom
- Branch: Royal Air Force
- Type: Royal Air Force group
- Role: Military aviation training
- Part of: RAF Flying Training Command
- Last HQ: Cargen House, Dumfries

No. 29 Group RAF is a former Royal Air Force group that was formed as No. 29 (Training) Group RAF during October 1918 within the First World War at RAF Heliopolis controlling various units until November 1918. It was reformed on 27 November 1918 at No. 12 Great Stuart Street, Princes Street, Edinburgh controlling naval units as No. 29 (Operations) Group RAF until 31 March 1922 when it was disbanded into RAF Coastal Area. It was reformed as No. 29 (Flying Training) Group within RAF Flying Training Command on 1 July 1942 at Buntingsdale Hall, Market Drayton controlling Air Gunners Schools and (Observers) Advanced Flying Units based in Northern England. It was disbanded on 7 January 1945.

== Structure ==
April 1943 – HQ at Dumfries

- RAF Barrow = No. 10 Air Gunners School RAF
- RAF Cark = Staff Pilot Training Unit RAF
- RAF Dalcross = No. 2 Air Gunners School RAF
- RAF Dumfries = No. 10 (Observers) Advanced Flying Unit RAF
- RAF Evanton = No. 8 Air Gunners School RAF
- RAF Jurby = No. 5 Air Observers School RAF
- RAF Millom = No. 2 (Observers) Advanced Flying Unit RAF
- RAF Morpeth = No. 4 Air Gunners School RAF
- RAF West Freugh = No. 4 Air Observers School RAF
- RAF Wigtown = No. 1 (Observers) Advanced Flying Unit RAF

July 1944 – HQ at Dumfries

- RAF Andreas = No. 11 Air Gunners School RAF
- RAF Bishops Court = No. 7 (Observers) Advanced Flying Unit RAF & No. 12 Air Gunners School RAF
- RAF Castle Kennedy = No. 3 Air Gunners School RAF
- RAF Dalcross = No. 2 Air Gunners School RAF
- RAF Dumfries = No. 10 (Observers) Advanced Flying Unit RAF
- RAF Evanton = No. 8 Air Gunners School RAF
- RAF Morpeth = No. 4 Air Gunners School RAF
- RAF West Freugh = No. 4 (Observers) Advanced Flying Unit RAF
- RAF Wigtown = No. 1 (Observers) Advanced Flying Unit RAF

July 1945 – HQ at Dumfries

- RAF Andreas = No. 11 Air Gunners School RAF
- RAF Bishops Court = No. 7 Air Navigation School RAF
- RAF Dalcross = No. 2 Air Gunners School RAF
- RAF Dumfries = No. 10 Air Navigation School RAF
- RAF Jurby = No. 5 Air Navigation School RAF
- RAF Wigtown = No. 1 (Observers) Advanced Flying Unit RAF
