= List of Royal Air Force units & establishments =

There have been many units with various tasks in the Royal Air Force (RAF), and they are listed here. A unit is an administrative term for a body, which can be larger or smaller than a flight or squadron, is given a specific mission, but does not warrant the status of being formed as a formal flight or squadron.

== Aircraft training units ==
- Argosy Conversion Unit RAF at RAF Benson (1961–63) became 'Argosy Flight' of No. 242 Operational Conversion Unit RAF
- Belvedere Conversion Unit RAF at RAF Odiham (1964–66)
- Belvedere Trials Unit RAF at RAF Odiham (1960–61) became No. 66 Squadron RAF
- Canberra Trials and Tactical Evaluation Unit at RAF Akrotiri (1966–68)
- Halifax Training Unit RAF part of No. 1332 (Transport) Heavy Conversion Unit RAF (-1946)
- Harrier Conversion Team RAF (1969–70) became Harrier Conversion Unit RAF, part of No. 233 Operational Conversion Unit RAF at RAF Wittering (1987–90)
- Jaguar Conversion Team RAF at RAF Lossiemouth (1973–74) became Jaguar Operational Conversion Unit RAF
- Jet Provost Trials Unit at RAF Tengah, Singapore
- Tornado F.3 Operational Evaluation Unit RAF at RAF Coningsby (1987-??)
- Tornado Weapons Conversion Unit RAF at RAF Honington/RAF Lossiemouth (1982–92) became No. 15 Squadron RAF
- Twin Pioneer Conversion Unit RAF at RAF Odiham (1963–64) became Short Range Conversion Unit RAF
- Typhoon Operational Evaluation Unit
- Victor (B.2) Trials Unit RAF at RAF Cottesmore (1961–62) became 'C' Flight of No. 232 Operational Conversion Unit RAF
- Warwick Training Unit RAF at RAF Docking (1943) became Air Sea Rescue Training Unit RAF
- Washington Conversion Unit RAF at RAF Marham (1950–53)
- Wessex Intensive Flying Trials Unit RAF at RAF Odiham (1963–64) became No. 18 Squadron RAF

== Advanced flying units ==
Observers

- 1 (1942-45)
- 2 (1942-45)
- 3 (1942-45)
- 4 (1943-45)
- 6 (1943-44)
- 7 (1944-45) became No. 7 Air Navigation School RAF
- 8 (1943-45)
- 9 (1942-45)
- 10 (1942-45) became No. 10 Air Navigation School RAF.

Pilots

- 2 (1942)
- 3 (1942-45) became No. 3 Service Flying Training School RAF
- 5 (1942-45, 1945-46)
- 6 (1942-45) became No. 6 Service Flying Training School RAF
- 7 (1942-44) became No. 7 Service Flying Training School RAF
- 9 (1942-45)
- 11 (1942-45)
- 12 (1942-45)
- 14 (1942-44)
- 15 (1942-45)
- 17 (1942-44)
- 18 (1942-45)
- 19 (1942-44)
- 20 (1943-45)
- 21 (1943-47) became No. 1 (Pilots) Refresher Flying Unit RAF and No. 2 (Pilots) Refresher Flying Unit RAF

== Armament practice and training units ==
To hone aircrew weapons skills armament practice camps and stations have been used and these are listed here.

Armament practice camp

unit	previous identity	formed at	formed	aircraft	disbanded	disbanded at	notes
No. 1 Armament Practice Camp		RAF Aldergrove	5 November 1941	Westland Lysander I/III; Miles Martinet TT.I	1 September 1945	RAF Aldergrove	
No. 2 Armament Practice Camp		RAF Thorney Island	5 November 1941	Westland Lysander II; Miles Martinet TT.I	1 September 1945	RAF Bradwell Bay	Absorbed by the Armament Practice Station, Spilsby RAF
No. 3 Armament Practice Camp		RAF Leuchars	5 November 1941	Westland Lysander II; Miles Martinet TT.I	1 September 1945	RAF Leuchars	
No. 4 Armament Practice Camp		RAF Talbenny	December 1942	Westland Lysander II; Miles Martinet TT.I	1 September 1945	RAF Talbenny	
No. 11 Armament Practice Camp	No. 1487 Flight RAF; No. 1498 Flight RAF	RAF Fairwood Common	18 October 1943	Hawker Typhoon Ib; Master II; Miles Martinet TT.I; Supermarine Spitfire IX	1 July 1945	RAF Fairwood Common	Combined with No. 18 APC to become No. 1 APS RAF
No. 12 Armament Practice Camp	No. 1486 Flight RAF	RAF Llanbedr	18 October 1943	Martinet II; Hawker Hurricane IV	21 February 1945	RAF Llanbedr	
No. 13 Armament Practice Camp	No. 1492 Flight RAF	RAF Weston Zoyland	18 October 1943	Martinet II; Hurricane IV	21 February 1945	RAF Llanbedr	
No. 14 Armament Practice Camp	No. 1490 Flight RAF	RAF Ayr	18 October 1943	Martinet II; Master II; Typhoon; Spitfire	4 October 1945	RAF Warmwell	
No. 15 Armament Practice Camp	No. 1491 Flight RAF	RAF Peterhead	18 October 1943	Martinet I & TT.I	21 February 1945	RAF Peterhead	
No. 16 Armament Practice Camp	No. 1489 Flight RAF	RAF Hutton Cranswick	18 October 1943	Martinet I & TT.I	21 February 1945	RAF Hutton Cranswick	
No. 17 Armament Practice Camp	No. 1488 Flight RAF	RAF Southend	18 October 1943	Martinet I & TT.I; Master II; Typhoon Ib; Spitfire IX	4 October 1945	RAF Warmwell	
No. 18 Armament Practice Camp	No. 1493 Flight RAF	RAF Gravesend	18 October 1943	Martinet I & TT.I; Hurricane; Master; Typhoon; Spitfire	1 July 1945	RAF Fairwood Common	Combined with No. 11 APC to become No. 1 APS RAF
No. 20 Armament Practice Camp	No. 1571 Flight RAF	RAF Ratmalana	30 January 1944	Hurricane IIb; Harvard IIb; Vultee Vengeance I	26 September 1945	RAF Sigiriya	
No. 21 Armament Practice Camp	No. 1572 Flight RAF	RAF St Thomas Mount	30 January 1944	Vengeance II; Harvard IIb; Vickers Wellington IC	18 June 1945	RAF Cholavarum	
No. 22 Armament Practice Camp	No. 1573 Flight RAF	RAF Amarda Road	30 January 1944	Spitfire VIII; Harvard IIb; Vengeance I	November 1946	RAF Ranchi	
No. 23 Armament Practice Camp		RAF Salbani	10 March 1944	Harvard IIb; Vengeance I	31 May 1945	RAF Dhubalia	
No. 24 Armament Practice Camp		B.170 Westerland	15 July 1945	Martinet TT.I; Master II; Hawker Tempest V	17 July 1946	RAF Sylt	Disbanded into Training Squadron, RAF Sylt
No. 25 Armament Practice Camp		B.170 Westerland	15 July 1945	Martinet TT.I; Master II; Tempest V Mosquito VI	17 July 1946	RAF Sylt	Disbanded into Training Squadron, RAF Sylt
No. 26 Armament Practice Camp		RAF Nicosia	15 April 1948	Bristol Beaufighter TT.10; Gloster Meteor T.7 & F.8 de Havilland Vampire T.11	19 February 1951	RAF Nicosia	
No. 27 Armament Practice Camp		RAF Butterworth	1 January 1949	Harvard IIb; Beaufighter TT.10; Meteor TT.8; Vampire FB.9	20 September 1954	RAF Butterworth	
Armament Practice Camp, Butterworth		RAF Butterworth	1 April 1955	Harvard IIb; Meteor T.7 & F.8; Vampire T.11	30 April 1956	RAF Butterworth	
Armament Practice Camp (Middle East Air Force)		RAF Nicosia	31 January 1956	Meteor T.7 & F.8; Vampire T.11	10 January 1957	RAF Habbaniya	

Armament practice station

unit	previous identity	formed at	formed	aircraft	disbanded	disbanded at	notes
Armament Practice Station, Acklington RAF	No. 2 APS	RAF Acklington	1 May 1946	Martinet TT.I; Mosquito T.3, FB.6 & TT.35; Spitfire LF.16e	27 July 1956	RAF Acklington	
Armament Practice Station, Lübeck RAF		RAF Lubeck	1 May 1946	Mosquito T.3 & FB.6; Meteor F.3 & F.4	30 September 1948	RAF Lubeck	
Armament Practice Station, Spilsby RAF		RAF Spilsby	1 December 1945	Martinet TT.I; Master II; Mosquito VI; Spitfire XVI	1 August 1946	RAF Spilsby	Disbanded to form part of APS Acklington RAF
Armament Practice Station, Sylt RAF as Training Squadron, RAF Sylt		RAF Sylt	17 July 1946	Martinet TT.I; Tempest TT.5; Mosquito T.3 & TT.35	29 February 1948	RAF Sylt	
Armament Practice Station, Sylt RAF as Armament Training Flight	Training Squadron, RAF Sylt	RAF Sylt	1 June 1949	Martinet TT.I; Mosquito T.3; Vampire FB.5	April 1957	RAF Sylt	Reformed
Armament Practice Station, Sylt RAF	Armament Training Flight	RAF Sylt	April 1957	Martinet TT.I; Mosquito T.3; Vampire FB.5	16 October 1961	RAF Sylt	Renamed
No. 1 Armament Practice Station RAF	No. 11 APC; No. 18 APC	RAF Fairwood Common	1 July 1945	Martinet II; Master II; Tempest V Spitfire XVI	1 May 1946	RAF Fairwood Common	
No. 2 Armament Practice Station RAF		RAF Bradwell Bay	1 July 1945	Martinet TT.I; Master II; Mosquito III	1 May 1946	RAF Spilsby	Became APS Acklington RAF
No. 3 Armament Practice Station RAF		RAF Hawkinge	10 August 1945	Martinet TT.I; Master II; Spitfire IX	RAF Charterhall	17 March 1946	
No. 3 Armament Practice Station RAF		RAF Charterhall	7 November 1946	Martinet TT.I	RAF Charterhall	26 March 1947	Reformed

Armament training camp

unit	previous identity	formed at	formed	aircraft	disbanded	disbanded at	notes
Armament Training Camp, Kuantan RAF		RAF Kuantan	16 October 1941				Overrun by Japanese forces
No. 1 Armament Training Camp RAF		RAF Catfoss	1 January 1932	Hawker Audax; Gloster Gauntlet de Havilland Moth; Fairey Gordon	1 April 1938	RAF Catfoss	Became No. 1 ATS RAF
No. 2 Armament Training Camp RAF		RAF North Coates Fitties	1 January 1932	Fairey IIIF; Westland Wallace	6 October 1936	RAF North Coates Fitties	Became Temp ATC North Coates Fitties RAF
No. 2 Armament Training Camp RAF		RAF Aldergrove	6 October 1936		1 April 1938	RAF Aldergrove	Reformed. Became No. 2 ATS RAF
No. 3 Armament Training Camp RAF		RAF Sutton Bridge	1 January 1932	Fairey IIF de Havilland Tiger Moth	1 April 1938	RAF Sutton Bridge	Became No. 3 ATS RAF
No. 3 Armament Training Camp RAF	No. 18 Group Armament Practice Camp	RAF Leuchars	November 1941	Lysander II; Martinet TT.I	1 September 1945	RAF Leuchars	Reformed
No. 4 Armament Training Camp RAF		RAF West Freugh	1 January 1937	Wallace I Vickers Wellesley	1 April 1938	RAF West Freugh	Became No. 4 ATS RAF
No. 4 Armament Training Camp RAF	No. 19 Group Armament Practice Camp	RAF Carew Cheriton	5 November 1941	Martinet TT.I	24 July 1942	RAF Carew Cheriton	Reformed
No. 5 Armament Training Camp RAF		RAF Penrhos	1 February 1937	Wallace II; Tutor	1 April 1938	RAF Penrhos	Became No. 5 ATS RAF
No. 6 Armament Training Camp RAF		RAF Woodsford	1 May 1937	Wallace I & II; Tutor	1 April 1938	RAF Warmwell	Became No. 6 ATS RAF
No. 7 Armament Training Camp RAF		RAF Acklington	1 April 1938	Fairey Seal	1 April 1938	RAF Acklington	Became No. 7 ATS RAF
No. 8 Armament Training Camp RAF		RAF Evanton	1 September 1937	Gordon; Hawker Hart Trainer	1 April 1938	RAF Evanton	Became No. 8 ATS RAF
Temporary Armament Training Camp, Aldergrove RAF		RAF Aldergrove	2 March 1936	Wallace I	6 October 1936	RAF Aldergrove	Became No. 2 ATC RAF
Temporary Armament Training Camp, Leuchars RAF		RAF Leuchars	March 1935	Gordon; Westland Wapiti IIa	1 April 1938	RAF Leuchars	Became Temporary ATS Leuchars RAF
Temporary Armament Training Camp, North Coates Fitties RAF		RAF North Coates Fitties	6 October 1936		1 April 1938	RAF North Coates Fitties	Became Temporary ATS North Coates Fitties RAF

Armament training station

unit	previous identity	formed at	formed	aircraft	disbanded	disbanded at	notes
No. 1 Armament Training Station RAF	No. 1 ATC	RAF Catfoss	1 April 1938	Henley; Tiger Moth II	3 September 1939	RAF Catfoss	
No. 1 Armament Training Station (BAFF) RAF		RAF Pembrey			24 July 1940	RAF Pembrey	
No. 2 Armament Training Station RAF	No. 2 ATC	RAF Aldergrove	1 April 1938	Hind; Wallace I & II	17 April 1939	RAF Aldergrove	Became No. 3 Air Observers School RAF
No. 3 Armament Training Station RAF	No. 3 ATC	RAF Sutton Bridge	1 April 1938	Gordon; Henley	3 September 1939	RAF Sutton Bridge	Disbanded into No. 4 Air Observers School RAF
No. 4 Armament Training Station RAF	No. 4 ATC	RAF West Freugh	1 April 1938	Seal; Wallace I & II	17 April 1939	RAF West Freugh	Became No. 4 Air Observers School RAF
No. 5 Armament Training Station RAF	No. 5 ATC	RAF Penrhos	1 April 1938	Henley; Miles Magister I	18 September 1939	RAF Jurby	Became No. 5 Air Observers School RAF
No. 6 Armament Training Station RAF	No. 6 ATC	RAF Woodsford	1 April 1938	Seal; Henley	3 September 1939	RAF Warmwell	Became part of No. 10 Air Observers School RAF
No. 7 Armament Training Station RAF	No. 7 ATC	RAF Acklington	1 April 1938	Seal; Henley	15 November 1938	RAF Acklington	Became No. 2 Air Observers School RAF
No. 8 Armament Training Station RAF	No. 8 ATC	RAF Evanton	1 April 1938	Henley; Gordon	3 September 1939	RAF Evanton	Became No. 8 Air Observers School RAF
No. 9 Armament Training Station RAF		RAF Stormy Down	1 June 1939	Henley	3 September 1939	RAF Stormy Down	Became No. 7 Air Observers School RAF
Temporary Armament Training Station, Leuchars RAF	Temporary ATC, Leuchars	RAF Leuchars	1 April 1938	Henley; Gordon	3 September 1939	RAF Leuchars	Disbanded into No. 8 Air Observers School RAF
Temporary Armament Training Station, North Coates Fitties RAF		RAF North Coates Fitties	1 April 1938		15 August 1938	RAF North Coates Fitties	
No. 1 Armament Training Unit RAF as Temporary Armament Training Unit RAF		RAF Peshawar	10 March 1942	Hart; Harvard	12 May 1943	RAF Bairagarh	Became No. 1 AGS RAF

== Bases ==
Base	Formed On	Operated at	Disbanded On	Became	Notes
11	1 July 1943	RAF Lindholme	5 November 1944	71 Base	
12	25 April 1943	RAF Binbrook	12 April 1945	Disbanded	
13	1 December 1943	RAF Elsham Wolds	15 December 1945	Disbanded	
14	16 December 1943	RAF Ludford Magna	25 October 1945	Disbanded	
15	7 October 1944	RAF Scampton	20 October 1945	Disbanded	Previously 52 Base
31	24 April 1943	RAF Stradishall	1 November 1944	73 Base	
32	1 March 1943	RAF Mildenhall	15 November 1945	Disbanded	
33	25 August 1943	RAF Waterbeach	1 September 1945	Disbanded	
41	5 March 1943	RAF Marston Moor	7 November 1944	74 Base	
42	1 March 1943	RAF Pocklington	1 September 1945	Disbanded	
43	6 June 1943	RAF Driffield	1 September 1945	Disbanded	
44	15 April 1944	RAF Holme-on-Spalding Moor	1 September 1945	Disbanded	
51	5 March 1943	RAF Swinderby	3 November 1944	75 Base	
52	10 May 1943	RAF Scampton	7 October 1944	15 Base	
53	14 November 1943	RAF Waddington	15 November 1945	Disbanded	
54	1 January 1944	RAF Coningsby	15 November 1945	Disbanded	
55	15 April 1944	RAF East Kirkby	15 November 1945	Disbanded	
56	1 October 1944	RAF Syerston	25 April 1945	Disbanded	
61 (RCAF)	25 March 1943	RAF Topcliffe	9 November 1944	76 Base	
62 (RCAF) (Beaver)	18 June 1943	RAF Linton-on-Ouse	15 August 1945	RCAF Control	
63 (RCAF)	1 May 1944	RAF Leeming	30 August 1945	Disbanded	
64 (RCAF)	1 May 1944	RAF Middleton St. George	14 June 1945	RCAF Control	
71	5 November 1944	RAF Lindholme	15 November 1945	Disbanded	Previously 11 Base
72	7 October 1944	RAF Bottesford	1 April 1945	Disbanded	
73	1 November 1944	RAF North Luffenham	1 August 1945	Disbanded	Previously 31 Base
74	7 November 1944	RAF Marston Moor	10 June 1945	Disbanded	Previously 41 Base
75	3 November 1944	RAF Swinderby	1 October 1945	Disbanded	Previously 51 Base
76 (RCAF)	9 November 1944	RAF Topcliffe	1 September 1945	Disbanded	Previously 61 Base

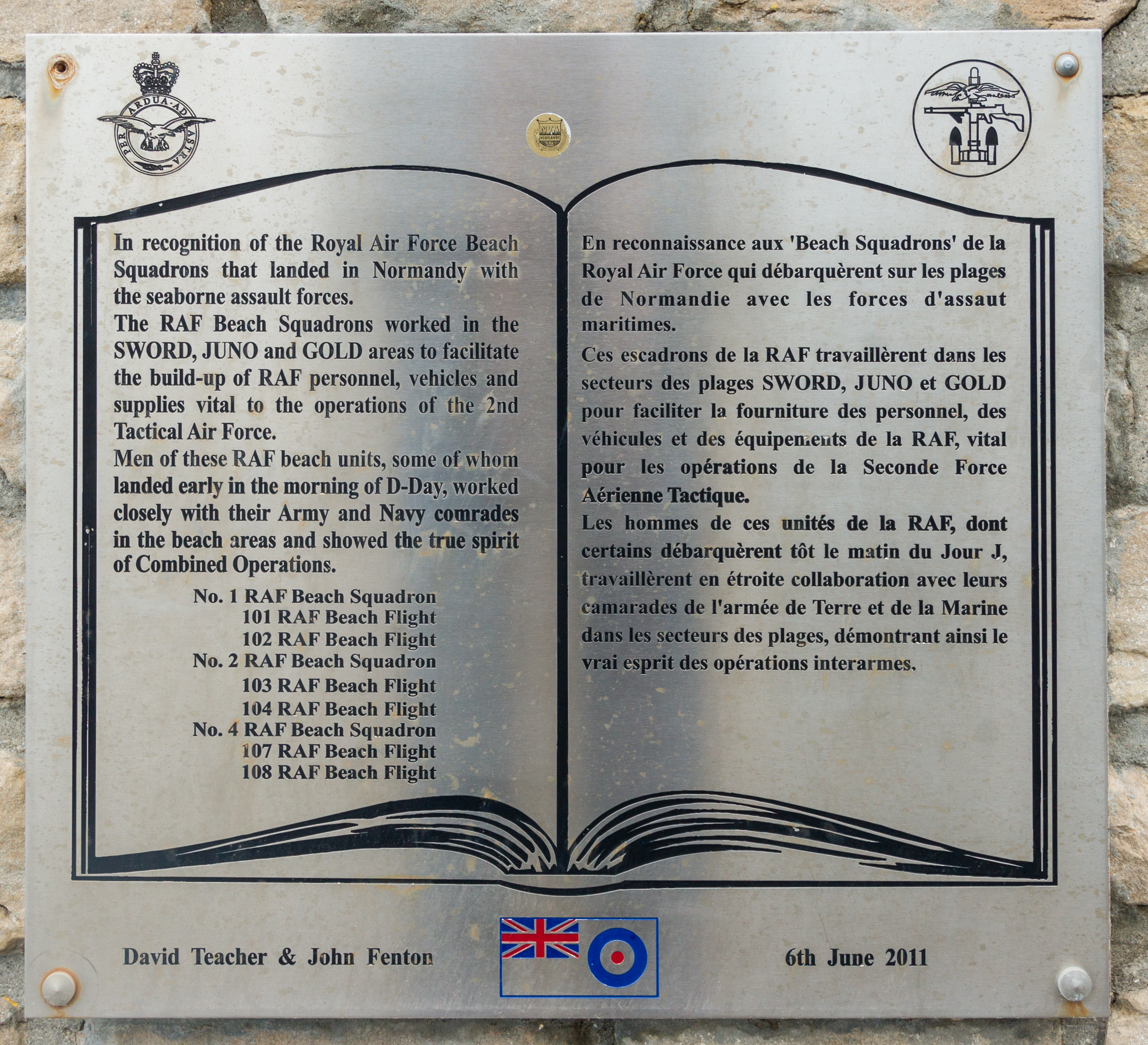
Memorial to 1, 2 and 4 Beach Sqns RAF at Arromanches, Normandy.

== Command level units ==
- Bomber Command Development Unit RAF (1954-68) became Strike Command Development Unit RAF
- Bomber Command Experimental Unit RAF (-1942) became Bombing Trials Unit RAF
- Coastal Command Development Unit RAF (1940-45) became Air-Sea Warfare Development Unit RAF
- Coastal Command Fighter Affiliation Training Unit RAF (1945-46)
- Coastal Command Fighter Circus RAF (1944-45) became Coastal Command Fighter Affiliation Training Unit RAF
- Fighter Command Trials Unit RAF (1966-67)
- Home Command Examining Unit RAF (1951-59)
- Transport Command Aircrew Examining Unit RAF (1945-46) became Transport Command Examining Unit RAF
- Transport Command Development Unit RAF (1945-50) became Air Transport Development Flight RAF
- Transport Command Examining Unit RAF (1946-64) became Transport Command Examining Staff RAF

== Conversion units ==
The RAF have now granted all OCUs Reserve squadron status.

== Establishments ==
- Aeroplane and Armament Experimental Establishment (1924-1992) became Aircraft and Armament Evaluation Establishment
- Aeroplane Experimental Establishment (Home) (1920-24) became Aeroplane and Armament Experimental Establishment
- Aeroplane Experimental Station (1917-20) became Aeroplane Experimental Establishment (Home)
- Aircraft and Armament Evaluation Establishment (1992-96) became Test and Evaluation Centre
- Air Fighting Development Establishment (1934-40) became Air Fighting Development Unit
- Air Warfare Centre (1993-)
- Airborne Forces Experimental Establishment (1942-50)
- Central Fighter Establishment (1944-66)
- Central Photographic Establishment (1946-50)
- Central Servicing Development Establishment (1950-)
- Central Signals Establishment (1946-65)
- Chemical and Biological Defence Establishment (CBDE)
- Chemical Defence Establishment
- Chemical Defence Experimental Establishment
- Chemical Warfare Experimental Station (CWES)
- Fighter Experimental Establishment (1941) became Telecommunications Flying Unit
- Home Aircraft Depot (1926-39) became RAF Henlow
- Inland Area Aircraft Depot (1920-26) became Home Aircraft Depot
- Instrument Design Establishment (1919-20) became Instrument Design Establishment (Home)
- Instrument Design Establishment (Home) (1920-22)
- Joint Warfare Establishment (1963-)
- Long-Range Weapons Establishment (1944-45) became Coastal Command Anti U-Boat Devices School RAF
- Marine Aircraft Experimental Establishment (1924-58)
- Microbiological Research Establishment
- Propellants, Explosives and Rocket Motor Establishment (PERME Westcott & PERME Waltham Abbey)
- Radio Warfare Establishment (1945-46) became Central Signals Establishment
- Rocket Propulsion Establishment
- Royal Air Force (Cadet) College (1919-20) became Royal Air Force College
- Royal Air Force Base, Calshot (1922-35) became RAF Calshot
- Royal Air Force Base, Gosport (1921-35) became RAF Station, Gosport Training Squadron
- Royal Air Force Station, Gosport Training Squadron (1935-??)
- Royal Air Force Base, Leuchars (1920-25) became Royal Air Force Training Base Leuchars
- Royal Air Force College (1920-39, 1946-)
- RAF College of Air Warfare (1962-74)
- Royal Air Force Flying College (1949-62) became RAF College of Air Warfare
- Royal Air Force Institute of Aviation Medicine (1950-)
- Royal Air Force Seaplane Establishment (1919) became School of Naval Co-operation
- Royal Air Force Technical College (1947-65)
- Royal Air Force Training Base, Leuchars (1925-35) became No. 1 Flying Training School RAF
- Royal Aircraft Establishment (1918-88) became Royal Aerospace Establishment
- Royal Aircraft Factory
- Strike Command Air to Air Missile Establishment (1968-??)
- Telecommunications Research Establishment
- Test and Evaluation Establishment (1992-)
- Testing Squadron (1916-17) became Aeroplane Experimental Station
- Tri-National Tornado Training Establishment (1981-)
- Visual Inter-Service Training and Research Establishment (1946-52?)
- War Department Experimental Ground
- Winter Research Establishment (1945-??) became Winterisation Experimental Establishment
- Winterisation Experimental Establishment (??-1949)
- Wireless Experimental Establishment (1917-18) became Wireless Telegraphy Establishment

== Foreign air arms ==
- Burmese Volunteer Air Force (1940–42) became Communication Flight, Dum-Dum
- Central Flying School (Southern Rhodesia) (1944–45)
- Hong Kong Auxiliary Air Force (1949–51) became Royal Hong Kong Auxiliary Air Force
- Hong Kong Volunteer Defence Force (Air Component) (1939–41)
- Kenya Auxiliary Air Unit (1939-??)
- Kenya Pool (1941) became Pilot and Aircrew Pool
- Norwegian Training Base (1945)
- Polish Fighting Team ("Skalski's Circus"), attached to 145 Squadron (1943)
- Polish Training Unit (1940) became No. 18 (Polish) Operational Training Unit RAF
- Straits Settlements Volunteer Air Force (1936–40) became Malayan Volunteer Air Force (1940-??)
- WAAF (Polish) Holding Unit
- Yugoslav Holding Unit (1944–45)

In Rhodesia, the Rhodesian Air Unit of the Territorial Forces, active 1935-39, became the Rhodesian Air Unit, and then the Southern Rhodesian Air Force (1939–40). The SRAF was absorbed into the RAF proper in April 1940 and re-designated No. 237 (Rhodesia) Squadron RAF. Later the Rhodesian Air Training Group RAF was created.

== Operational Training Units (OTU) ==
OTUs were created during World War II to take the pressure off operational squadrons, which previously would have had training Flights. Post war, they became OCUs.

== Other units ==
Numbered other units

- 'Q' Unit RAF (1920)
- 'Z' Unit, British Somaliland RAF (1919-20)
- No. 1 Air Sea Rescue Unit (North Africa) RAF (1943) became No. 1 Air Sea Rescue Flight (North Africa) RAF
- No. 1 British Airways Repair Unit (Middle East) RAF (1943-44) became No. 168 Maintenance Unit RAF
- No. 2 British Airways Repair Unit (Middle East) RAF (1943-44)
- No. 1 Camouflage Unit RAF (1939-44)
- No. 2 Camouflage Unit RAF (1939-40) became Photographic Development Unit RAF
- No. 1 Civilian Fighter Control Co-operation Unit RAF (1957-61)
- No. 2 Civilian Fighter Control Co-operation Unit RAF (1957-61)
- No. 3 Civilian Fighter Control Co-operation Unit RAF (1957-61)
- No. 1 Coast Artillery Co-operation Unit RAF (1937-41 & 1942-43)
- No. 1 Engine Consumption Unit RAF (1942) became No. 1 Engine Control Demonstration Unit RAF
- No. 1 Engine Control Demonstration Unit RAF (1942-45)
- No. 1 Fighter Support Training Unit RAF (1946)
- No. 3 Fighter Support Training Unit RAF (1945-46) became No. 1 Fighter Support Training Unit RAF
- No. 1 General Reconnaissance Unit RAF (1939-44)
- No. 2 General Reconnaissance Unit RAF (1940)
- No. 3 General Reconnaissance Unit RAF (1940)
- No. 1 Grading Unit (Airwork) RAF (1952-53)
- No. 2 Grading Unit (Airwork) RAF (1952-53)
- No. 1 Practice Flying Unit RAF (1940)
- No. 1 Royal Air Force Film Production Unit RAF (1944-47) became Film Production Unit Library RAF
- No. 1 Tactical Exercise Unit RAF (1944)
- No. 2 Tactical Exercise Unit RAF (1943-44)
- No. 3 Tactical Exercise Unit RAF (1944) became No. 55 OTU
- No. 4 Tactical Exercise Unit RAF (1944) became No. 3 Tactical Exercise Unit RAF
- No. 1 Tactical Weapons Unit RAF (1978-92)
- No. 2 Tactical Weapons Unit RAF (1978-81 & 1981-92) became No. 7 FTS
- No. 1 Torpedo Training Unit RAF (1943-44 & 1945-47)
- No. 2 Torpedo Training Unit RAF (1942-43)
- No. 2 Aircraft Delivery Unit RAF (1942-44) became No. 2 Ferry Unit RAF
- No. 3 Aircraft Delivery Unit RAF (1943-44) became No. 3 Ferry Unit RAF
- No. 4 Aircraft Delivery Unit RAF (1943-44) became No. 4 Ferry Unit RAF
- No. 2 Group Support Unit RAF (1944-45) became No. 2 Group Disbandment Centre RAF
- No. 83 Group Support Unit RAF (1944-45) became No. 83 Group Disbandment Centre RAF
- No. 84 Group Support Unit RAF (1944-45) became No. 84 Group Disbandment Centre RAF
- No. 88 Group Support Unit RAF (1945)
- No. 11 (Landplane) Preparation and Modification Unit RAF (1945-46)
- No. 12 (Flying Boat) Preparation and Modification Unit RAF (RAF Calshot) (1945-46)
- No. 201 Crew Training Unit RAF (1947) became No. 201 Advanced Flying School RAF
- No. 202 Crew Training Unit RAF (1947) became No. 202 Advanced Flying School RAF
- No. 204 Crew Training Unit RAF (1947) became No. 204 Advanced Flying School RAF
- 2nd Tactical Air Force Air Sea Rescue Unit RAF (1955-61)
- 2nd Tactical Air Force Development Unit RAF (1953) became No. 1323 (Canberra) Flight RAF
- 2nd Tactical Air Force Support Unit RAF (1954)

Other units

- Advanced Flying Training Unit RAF (1943-45) became Tactical and Weapon Development Unit RAF
- Advanced Flying Unit RAF, Sétif (1943-44)
- Air Combat Development Unit (Middle East) RAF (????)
- Air Defence Co-operation Unit RAF (1942) became No. 26 Anti-Aircraft Co-operation Unit RAF
- Air Defence Unit RAF, Tanganyika (1939)
- Air Fighting Development Unit RAF (1940-44) became Air Fighting Development Squadron RAF
- Air Fighting Training Unit RAF (1943-44)
- Air Gunnery Training Unit RAF (1943-44)
- Air Ministry Servicing Development Unit RAF (1947-50) became Central Servicing Development Establishment RAF
- Air Movements Development Unit RAF (1958-65) became Air Transport Development Unit RAF
- Air Photographic Development Unit RAF (1947-50)
- Air Transport Development Centre (India) RAF (1944-??) became RAF Element, Air Transport Development Centre
- Air Transport Development Unit RAF (1965-67) became Joint Air Transport Establishment
- Air Transport Tactical Development Unit RAF (1944-45) became Transport Command Development Unit RAF
- Air Sea Rescue Training Unit RAF (1943-44)
- Air/Sea Warfare Development Unit (ACSEA) RAF (1944-45)
- Air-Sea Warfare Development Unit RAF (1945-70)
- Airborne Forces Research Centre RAF
- Airborne Forces Tactical Development Unit RAF (1943-44) became Air Transport Tactical Development Unit RAF
- Aircraft Delivery Unit RAF (1941-42) became No. 1 Aircraft Delivery Unit RAF
- Aircraft Torpedo Development Unit RAF (1943-58)
- Aircrew Testing and Grading Unit RAF (1945) became Transport Command Aircrew Examining Unit RAF
- Airwork Grading Unit RAF (1952) became No.1 and No. 2 Grading Units (Airwork)
- Anti-Aircraft Co-operation Unit RAF (1936-37) became No. 1 Anti-Aircraft Co-operation Unit RAF
- Armament and Instrument Experimental Unit RAF (1946-55) became Armament and Instrument Experimental Establishment
- Armament Experimental Station RAF (1917-20)
- Army Co-operation Development Unit RAF (????)
- Beam Approach Development Unit RAF (1942-43) became 'A' Flight, Signals Development Unit RAF
- Blind Approach Training and Development Unit RAF (1939-40) became Wireless Intelligence Development Unit RAF
- Blind Landing Experimental Unit (1945-49) became Bomb Ballistic and Blind Landing Experimental Unit RAF
- Bomb Ballistic and Blind Landing Experimental Unit RAF (1949-50) became Armament and Instrument Experimental Unit RAF
- Bomb Ballistic Unit RAF (1944-49) became Bomb Ballistic and Blind Landing Experimental Unit RAF
- Bomber Development Unit RAF (1940-41)
- Bomber Support Development Unit RAF (1944-45) became Radio Warfare Establishment RAF
- Bombing Development Unit RAF (1942-45)
- Bombing Trials Unit RAF (1942-55)
- British Airways Repair Unit (Middle East) (1942-43) became No. 1 British Airways Repair Unit (Middle East) RAF
- Central Interpretation Unit
- Civilian Fighter Control Co-operation Unit RAF (1952-57)
- Coast Defence Development Unit RAF (-1935) became Coastal Defence Development Unit RAF
- Electronic Warfare and Avionics Unit RAF (1976-93) became Electronic Warfare Operational Support Establishment RAF
- Enemy Aircraft Storage and Servicing Unit RAF (1945-46)
- Engine Consumption Unit RAF (1942) became No. 1 Engine Consumption Unit RAF
- Experimental Air Ambulance Service RAF (1925-26)
- Experimental Co-operation Unit RAF (1938)
- Far East Tactical Development Unit RAF (1943-45)
- Fast Jet and Weapons Operational Evaluation Unit
- Fighter Armament Trials Unit RAF (1946-56)
- Fighter Interception Development Unit RAF (1944)
- Fighter Interception Unit (1940-44) became Fighter Interception Development Unit RAF
- Fleet Requirements Unit RAF (1938-39)
- Floatplane Training Unit RAF (1939) became Floatplane Training Squadron RAF
- Flying Boat Practice Camp RAF (1932)
- GEE (TR1335) Training Unit RAF (1941-42) became No. 1418 GEE (TR1335) Trials Flight RAF
- Glider Exercise Unit RAF (1941) became Glider Exercise Squadron RAF
- Glider Pilot Exercise Unit RAF (1942-43) became Operational and Refresher Training Unit RAF
- Glider Training Unit RAF (1942)
- Gransden Lodge Navigation Training Unit RAF (1943) became Navigation Training Unit RAF
- Gremlin Task Force – Japanese aircraft and crew transport operations (1945-46)
- Ground Attack Training Unit RAF (1945) became Tactical and Weapon Development Unit RAF
- Gunnery Research Unit RAF (1940-45)
- Instant Readiness Reserve Unit RAF (1979-81) became Lightning Augmentation Flight RAF
- Joint Air Delivery Test and Evaluation Unit
- Joint Air Transport Evaluation Unit
- Joint Concealment Centre (Royal Air Force Component) RAF (1952-58)
- Joint Experimental Helicopter Unit RAF (1955-60) became No. 225 Squadron RAF
- Joint Forward Air Controller Training and Standards Unit
- Jungle Target Research Unit RAF (1944-45)
- Long-Range Development Unit RAF (1938)
- Loran Training Unit RAF (1944-45) became Coastal Command Anti U-Boat Devices School RAF
- Majunga Detachment Support Unit RAF (-1971) became No. 204 Squadron RAF
- Marine Aircraft Experimental Unit RAF (1920-24) became Marine Aircraft Experimental Establishment RAF
- Merchant Ship Fighter Unit (1941-43)
- Middle East Advanced Crew Training Unit RAF (1942-??)
- Ministry of Defence Hospital Unit
- Missing Research and Enquiry Service (1944–1949)
- Mobile Catering Support Unit RAF
- Navigation Training Unit RAF (1943-46)
- Night Ground Attack Trials Unit RAF (1952-??)
- Operational and Refresher Training Unit RAF (1943-46) became No. 1385 (Heavy Transport Support) Conversion Unit RAF
- Overseas Experimental Unit RAF (1960-66)
- Parachute Test Unit RAF (1950-55)
- Photographic Development Unit RAF (1940) became Photographic Reconnaissance Unit RAF
- Photographic Reconnaissance Development Unit RAF (1943-47) became Air Photographic Development Unit RAF
- Photographic Reconnaissance Unit RAF (1940) became No. 1 Photographic Reconnaissance Unit RAF
- Pilot Refresher Training Unit RAF (1942) became Refresher Flying Training School RAF
- Pilotless Aircraft Unit RAF (1940-46)
- Radar Research Flying Unit RAF (1955-77) became Radar Research Squadron RAF
- Radio Engineering Unit RAF (1950-??)
- Research and Development Unit RAF (1943-46)
- Royal Air Force Aerobatic Team – 'The Red Arrows' (1965-)
- Royal Air Force Element, Allied Tactical Air Intelligence Unit, Southeast Asia (1943-46)
- Royal Air Force Element, Helicopter Development Unit (1961-65) became Short-Range Transport Development Unit RAF
- Royal Air Force Film Production Unit (1941-44) became No. 1 Royal Air Force Film Production Unit
- Royal Air Force Film Unit (1944-??)
- Search and Rescue Training Unit
- Special Duties (Radio) Development Unit RAF (1944) became Bomber Support Development Unit RAF
- Special Installation Unit RAF (1942-46)
- Staff Pilot Training Unit RAF (1942 & 1943-45)
- Strike Attack Operational Evaluation Unit (SAOEU) (1987-)
- Strike Command Development Unit RAF (1968)
- Survival and Rescue Training Unit (1945-49)
- Tactical and Weapon Development Unit (India) RAF (1945)
- Tactical Weapons Unit RAF (1974-78) became No. 1 Tactical Weapons Unit RAF
- Target Towing Section, Shallufa RAF (1953-54)
- Telecommunications Flying Unit RAF (1941-55) became Radar Research Flying Unit RAF
- Torpedo Development Section RAF (-1939)
- Torpedo Development Unit RAF (1939-43) became Aircraft Torpedo Development Unit RAF
- Torpedo Training Unit RAF (1936-43) became No. 1 Torpedo Training Unit RAF
- Transport Support Practice Camp (BAFO) RAF (1948)
- Transport Support Practice Camp RAF (1947-48)
- Transport Support Training Unit RAF (1944-45) became No. 1334 (Transport Support) Conversion Unit RAF
- Tropical Experimental Unit RAF (1947-60) became Overseas Experimental Unit RAF
- Wireless Development Unit RAF (1939) became Station Flight, Perth
- Wireless Intelligence Development Unit RAF (1940) became No. 109 Squadron RAF
- Wireless Testing Park (1916-17) became Wireless Experimental Establishment

== Pools ==
- No. 1 (Middle East) Pilots and Aircrew Pool RAF (1942) became Middle East Advanced Crew Training Unit RAF
- No. 2 (Middle East) Pilots and Aircrew Pool RAF (1942)
- No. 1 Group Pool RAF (1939-40) became No. 12 OTU
- No. 2 Group Pool RAF (1939-40) became No. 13 OTU
- No. 3 Group Pool RAF (1939-40) became No. 15 OTU
- No. 4 Group Pool RAF (1939-40) became No. 10 OTU
- No. 5 Group Pool RAF (1939-40) became No. 16 OTU
- No. 11 Group Pool RAF (1939-40) became No. 6 OTU
- No. 12 Group Pool RAF (1939-40) became No. 5 OTU
- Pupil Pilots Pool RAF (1943-47)
- No. 1 Pupil Pilots Pool RAF (1941-43)
- No. 2 Pupil Pilots Pool RAF (1941-43)
- No. 3 Pupil Pilots Pool RAF (1941-43) became Pupil Pilots Pool RAF
- Aircrew Transit Pool RAF (1943-44) became No. 3 Refresher Flying Unit RAF
- Pilots and Aircrew Pool RAF (1941-42) became No. 1 (Middle East) Pilots and Aircrew Pool RAF
- Pilots Reinforcement and Reserve Pool RAF (1940) became Reinforcement and Reserve Pool RAF
- Pool of Pilots, Joyce Green RAF (1919)
- Pool of Pilots, Manston RAF (1918) became Pool of Pilots, Joyce Green RAF
- Pilot Training Unit and Reinforcement Pool RAF (1939-40)
- Reinforcement and Reserve Pool RAF (1940) became Training Unit and Reserve Pool RAF
- Training Unit and Reserve Pool RAF (1940) became No. 70 OTU

== Photographic reconnaissance ==
- No. 1 Photographic Reconnaissance Unit RAF (1940-42 & 1982-92)
- No. 2 Photographic Reconnaissance Unit RAF (1941-43) became No. 680 Squadron RAF
- No. 3 Photographic Reconnaissance Unit RAF (India) (1942-43) became No. 681 Squadron RAF
- No. 3 Photographic Reconnaissance Unit RAF (1940-41 & 1941-42) became 3 PRU RAF (India)
- No. 4 Photographic Reconnaissance Unit RAF (1941-43) became No. 682 Squadron RAF
- No. 5 Photographic Reconnaissance Unit RAF (1942) became 3 PRU RAF (India)

== Refresher flying units ==
- 1 (Pilots) & 2 (Pilots)
- 1, Planned but cancelled, 2, Planned but cancelled, 3, 4, 5, 6, 7, 8 & 9.

== Sectors ==
sector	formed on	formed at	disbanded on	disbanded at	became	notes
11 (Northern)	April 1963	RAF Leconfield	April 1968	RAF Boulmer	Sector South	
12 (East Anglia)	April 1963	RAF Horsham St Faith	April 1968	Neatishead	Sector North	
13 (Scotland)	April 1963	RAF Boulmer	March 1965	RAF Boulmer	Disbanded into 11 Sector	
15	May 1944	RAF Ford	July 1944	Martragny	Disbanded	
17 (Fighter)	May 1944	RAF Kenley	July 1944	Crepon	Disbanded	
18 (Fighter)	May 1944	RAF Chailey	July 1944	RAF Chailey	Disbanded	
19 (Fighter)	May 1944	RAF Appledram	July 1944	RAF Appledram	Disbanded	
20 (Fighter)	May 1944	RAF Thorney Island	July 1944	RAF Thorney Island	Disbanded	
21 (Base Defence)	May 1944	RAF Sopley Park	July 1944	RAF Ibsley	Disbanded	
22 (Fighter)	May 1944	RAF Hurn	July 1944	Le Fresnoy	Disbanded	
24 (Base Defence)	May 1944	RAF Wartling	March 1945	St Denis Westrem	Disbanded into 85 Group Unit	
25 (Base Defence)	May 1944	RAF Hornchurch	March 1945	Everburg	Disbanded into 85 Group Operations Room	
North	April 1968	RAF Neatishead	January 1992	RAF Neatishead	Disbanded	
South	April 1968	RAF Boulmer	January 1992	RAF Boulmer	Disbanded	
Caledonian Sector HQ RAF	October 1951	RAF Barnton Quarry	November 1957	RAF Barnton Quarry	Disbanded	
Eastern Sector HQ RAF	July 1946	RAF Horsham St Faith	July 1958	RAF Coltishall	Disbanded	
Essex Sector HQ RAF	October 1945	RAF North Weald	June 1946	RAF North Weald	Metropolitan Sector HQ	
Fighter Sector Z RAF	September 1943	Amriya	October 1943	Amriya	No. 335 Wing	
Fighter Sector HQ Digby RAF	July 1945	RAF Blankney	November 1945	RAF Blankney	Lincolnshire Sector HQ	
Fighter Sector HQ Exeter RAF	January 1945	RAF Exeter	November 1945	RAF Exeter	Western Sector HQ	
Lincolnshire Sector HQ RAF	November 1945	RAF Blankney	July 1946	RAF Blankney	Eastern Sector HQ	
Metropolitan Sector HQ RAF	May 1946	RAF North Weald	November 1957	RAF North Weald	Disbanded	
Norfolk Sector HQ RAF	August 1945	RAF Horsham St Faith	July 1946	RAF Horsham St Faith	Eastern Sector HQ	
Northern Sector HQ RAF	December 1950	RAF Linton-On-Ouse	November 1957	RAF Church Fenton	Disbanded	
Scottish Sector HQ RAF	November 1949	RAF Turnhouse	October 1951	RAF Leuchars	Station Flight, Caledonian Sector	
Southern Sector HQ RAF	January 1946	RAF Nether Wallop	November 1957	RAF Rudloe Manor	Disbanded	
South Eastern Sector HQ RAF	November 1945	RAF Biggin Hill	June 1946	RAF North Weald	Metropolitan Sector	
Western Sector HQ RAF	November 1945	RAF Exeter	July 1946	RAF Exeter	Southern Sector HQ	
Yorkshire Sector HQ RAF	November 1945	RAF Church Fenton	December 1950	RAF Patrington	Northern Sector HQ	

== Training wings ==
- No. 1 Combat Training Wing RAF (1943–44) became No. 1 Tactical Exercise Unit RAF
- No. 2 Combat Training Wing RAF (1943) became No. 2 Tactical Exercise Unit RAF

== See also ==
Royal Air Force

- List of Royal Air Force aircraft squadrons
- List of Royal Air Force aircraft independent flights
- List of conversion units of the Royal Air Force
- List of Royal Air Force Glider units
- List of Royal Air Force Operational Training Units
- List of Royal Air Force schools
- List of Royal Air Force units & establishments
- List of RAF squadron codes
- List of RAF Regiment units
- List of Battle of Britain squadrons
- List of wings of the Royal Air Force
- Royal Air Force roundels

Army Air Corps

- List of Army Air Corps aircraft units

Fleet Air Arm

- List of Fleet Air Arm aircraft squadrons
- List of Fleet Air Arm groups
- List of aircraft units of the Royal Navy
- List of aircraft wings of the Royal Navy

Others

- List of Air Training Corps squadrons
- University Air Squadron
- Air Experience Flight
- Volunteer Gliding Squadron
- United Kingdom military aircraft registration number
- United Kingdom aircraft test serials
- British military aircraft designation systems
