= Exercise Purple Warrior =

Exercise Purple Warrior was a British military exercise conducted in south west Scotland in November, 1987. The exercise was designed to test lessons learned during the Falklands War and is estimated to have cost around £7.5 million (equivalent to £26,646,447 in 2023).

Most troops involved in this exercise left from Colchester by road to embark onto a small flotilla at Harwich docks and from there to the western coast of Scotland by beached landings. The Port Stanley situation was exercised from RAF West Freugh. HMS Illustrious was involved in the operation with 845 and 846 NAS embarked. 1 and 43 squadrons from the RAF were also involved as part of "Blue force" (i.e., the invaders) seeking to capture West Freugh from "Orange force" (i.e., the defenders).

The exercise was observed by 34 representatives from 20 countries, of which 12 being from Warsaw Pact countries at a cost to the United Kingdom of around £21,000 (equivalent to £74,610 in 2023).

The Exercise was the subject of two Editions of the BBC Television Factual series "Horizon" which aired in the UK on consecutive weeks in March 1988. Series 24, Episode 10 "Purple Warrior: Rules of Engagement" and Series 24, Episode 11 "Purple Warrior: Limited War"
