= RAF Spilsby =

Former RAF station in Lincolnshire, England

RAF Spilsby
- Great Steeping, Lincolnshire in England
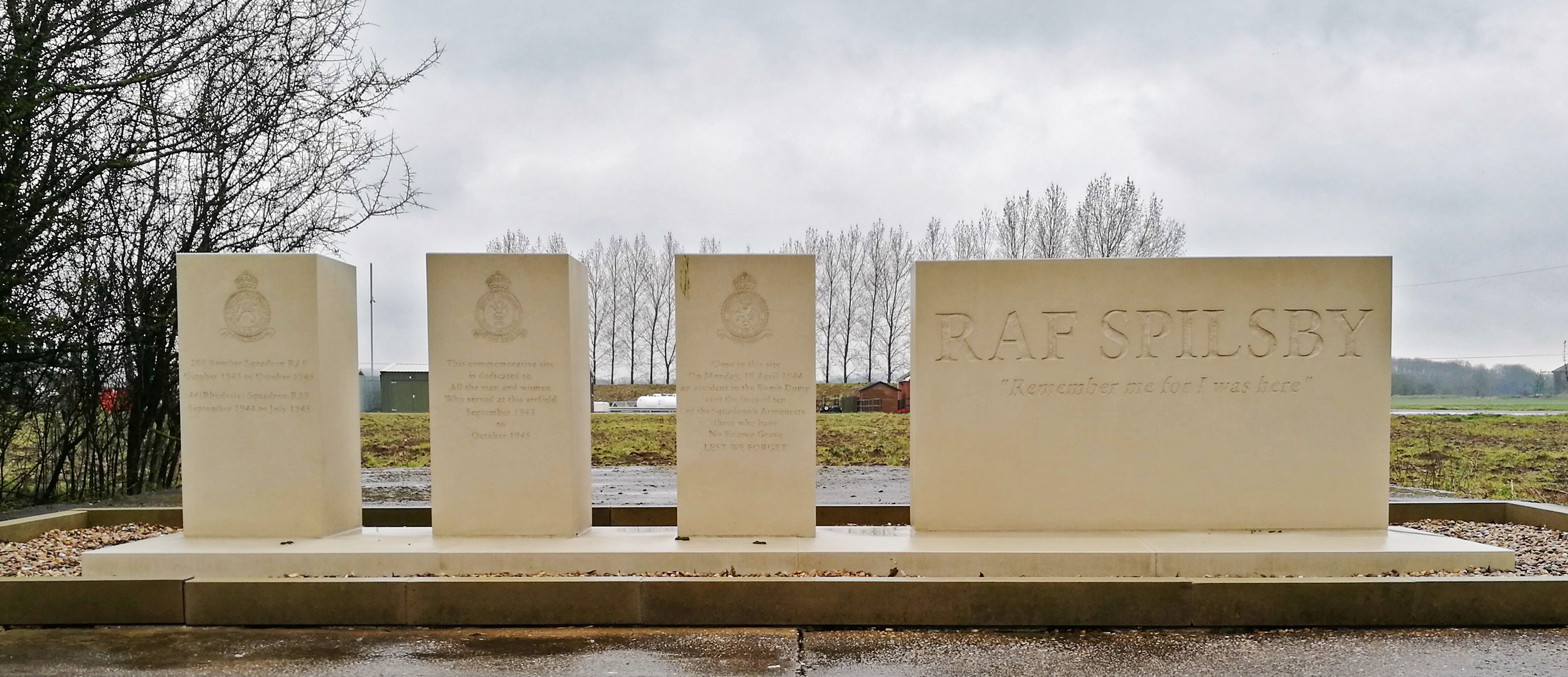
- The new memorial, unveiled on 9 June 2012

Site information
- Type: Royal Air Force station
- Owner: Ministry of Defence
- Operator: Royal Air Force; United States Air Force
- Controlled by: RAF Bomber Command

Location
- Shown within Lincolnshire RAF Spilsby (the United Kingdom)
- Coordinates: 53°09′37″N 000°10′04″E

Site history
- Built: 1942/43
- In use: 1943 - 1946; 1955 - March 1958
- Battles/wars: European theatre of World War II; Cold War

Airfield information
Runways
Direction	Length and surface
00/00	1,830 metres (6,004 ft)
00/00	1,830 metres (6,004 ft)
00/00

Royal Air Force Spilsby or more simply RAF Spilsby is a former Royal Air Force station during the Second World War and the Cold War located in the rural village of Great Steeping, near the market town of Spilsby, Lincolnshire, England.

== History ==
=== A change of location ===
During the Second World War the Air Ministry attempted to build an airfield at Gunby Hall that would have covered most of the estate and necessitated the demolition of the magnificent and historic hall. The then owner, Field Marshal Sir Archibald Montgomery-Massingberd personally appealed to King George VI and the Air Ministry relented, redrawing the plans that resulted in the building of the resited RAF Spilsby although the runway would eventually end only a few yards short of the Gunby estate boundary hedge.

=== First action ===
The airfield was built at Great Steeping, just 2 mi (3.2 km) south west of its originally planned location at Gunby, during 1942 to 1943 and opened for action on 20 September 1943 as an overflow satellite airfield to RAF East Kirkby in 5 (Bomber) Group RAF. The first operational squadron to be based at Spilsby was No. 207 Squadron RAF who moved from RAF Langar on 12 October 1943. The squadron bombed Hanover in Germany six days later on 18 October and the following week the station was upgraded from satellite status to a full station in its own right.

=== Later in the war ===
In April 1944 the three local bomber stations at Spilsby, Strubby and East Kirkby combined to form the 55 Base RAF with the headquarters located at East Kirkby. RAF Spilsby became a two squadron station when No. 44 Squadron RAF relocated from RAF Dunholme Lodge near Lincoln in October 1944.

In 1944 a Spilsby-based 207 Squadron airman, Flying Officer Denys Street escaped from the German prisoner of war camp Stalag Luft III and was one of the fifty executed by the Gestapo in the aftermath of the mass escape that was later filmed as The Great Escape.

During the war the Lancasters of 207 Squadron flew over 6,000 individual sorties during 540 operational missions, by both day and night with the loss of 154 seven man crews killed or missing, with at least another 9 aircraft lost on non-operational training or ferry flights.

As the Second World War came to an end 44 Squadron was moved south to RAF Mepal in Cambridgeshire and they were replaced by No. 75 (New Zealand) Squadron who were planned to be part of the Tiger Force against Japan. However, when the nuclear bombs were dropped on Hiroshima and Nagasaki and the war ended, the Spilsby squadrons were moved elsewhere in October 1945. The airfield defence force of No. 2751 Squadron RAF Regiment remained at RAF Spilsby and it became No. 2 Armament and Gunnery Practice School.

Armament Practice Station, Spilsby was here between 1 December 1945 and 1 August 1946.

=== Airfield accidents ===
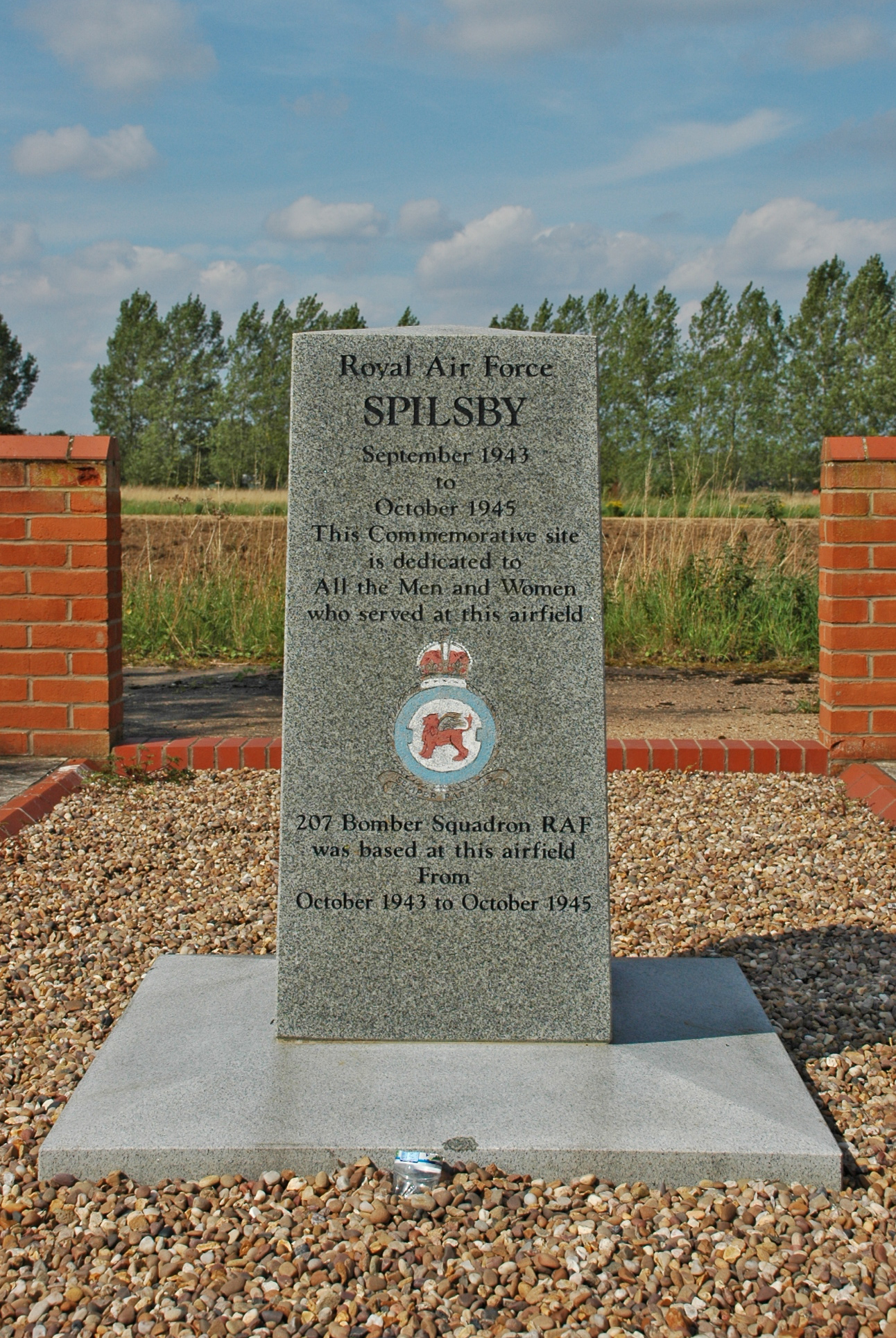
Original memorial on the airfield, now moved to Monksthorpe Chapel

On Easter Monday 10 April 1944, during the preparation for an operation, a 1,000 lb (450 kg) bomb exploded while it was being disarmed in a fusing shed. Ten squadron armourers were killed, three of whom were never found and have no known grave. The force of the explosion also caused damage to some of the airfield's buildings and even some slight damage in the nearby community.

The second accident happened on 1 November 1944. During 207 Squadron's daylight departure on sorties, a Lancaster piloted by Flying Officer Arthur Loveless swung violently on take-off and careered across the airfield. It demolished a Nissen hut before coming to rest among four Halifaxes belonging to 429 'Bison' Squadron (RCAF) which had been diverted to Spilsby from the previous night's operation. The Lancaster and three of the Halifaxes were destroyed by explosion and fire. A fourth Halifax was severely damaged and its Flight Engineer killed when he started the engines with the intention of getting clear of the inferno. Once again a number of the airfield's buildings were damaged with the control tower having a narrow escape.

A few days later on 11 November, a further tragedy befell Spilsby airmen when returning home from an operation. Two Lancasters – one from 44 Squadron, flown by Pilot Officer Garyer, and one from 207 Squadron – received identical landing instructions from the Spilsby control tower and collided in the approach funnel over the village of Bratoft, east of the airfield, killing both crews and scattering debris over a large area. This led to revised approach procedures being implemented with aircraft being allocated specific time slots to prevent overcrowding in the circuit.

=== The Cold War period and closure ===
In December 1946 RAF Spilsby was abandoned and placed on care and maintenance until June 1955, during which time it was used for storing overflow supplies for RAF East Kirkby. After the Korean War and as the Cold War started RAF Spilsby re-opened to host units of the USAF and the east-west runway was extended by 1,590 ft (480 m) in preparation for accommodating long range escort fighters. However no USAF squadrons were ever based at Spilsby, where only non-flying units were stationed, there is no evidence that the airfield was used by any aircraft. The Korean war had ended in 1953 but the USAF did not move out until March 1958, relocating to RAF Mildenhall, when the Spilsby airfield immediately closed. The extended runway was long enough to handle the RAF's jet engined nuclear bomber V-force and a decision to rip it out was delayed for nearly twenty years just in case it became needed again by the RAF.

Spilsby remained on RAF maps as a designated emergency landing site for the Avro Vulcan bombers based at RAF Scampton. With the V-force disbanding the runways and perimeter track were finally torn up during the late 1970s, with most of the crushed aggregate being used in the construction of the new Humber Bridge.

== Memorials ==
RAF Spilsby is commemorated by an Airfield Memorial standing just outside Great Steeping and by plaques in the All Saints' Church Great Steeping. The ghost cropmarks showing the airfield's runway layout are still visible on some aerial photographs and at certain times of the year.

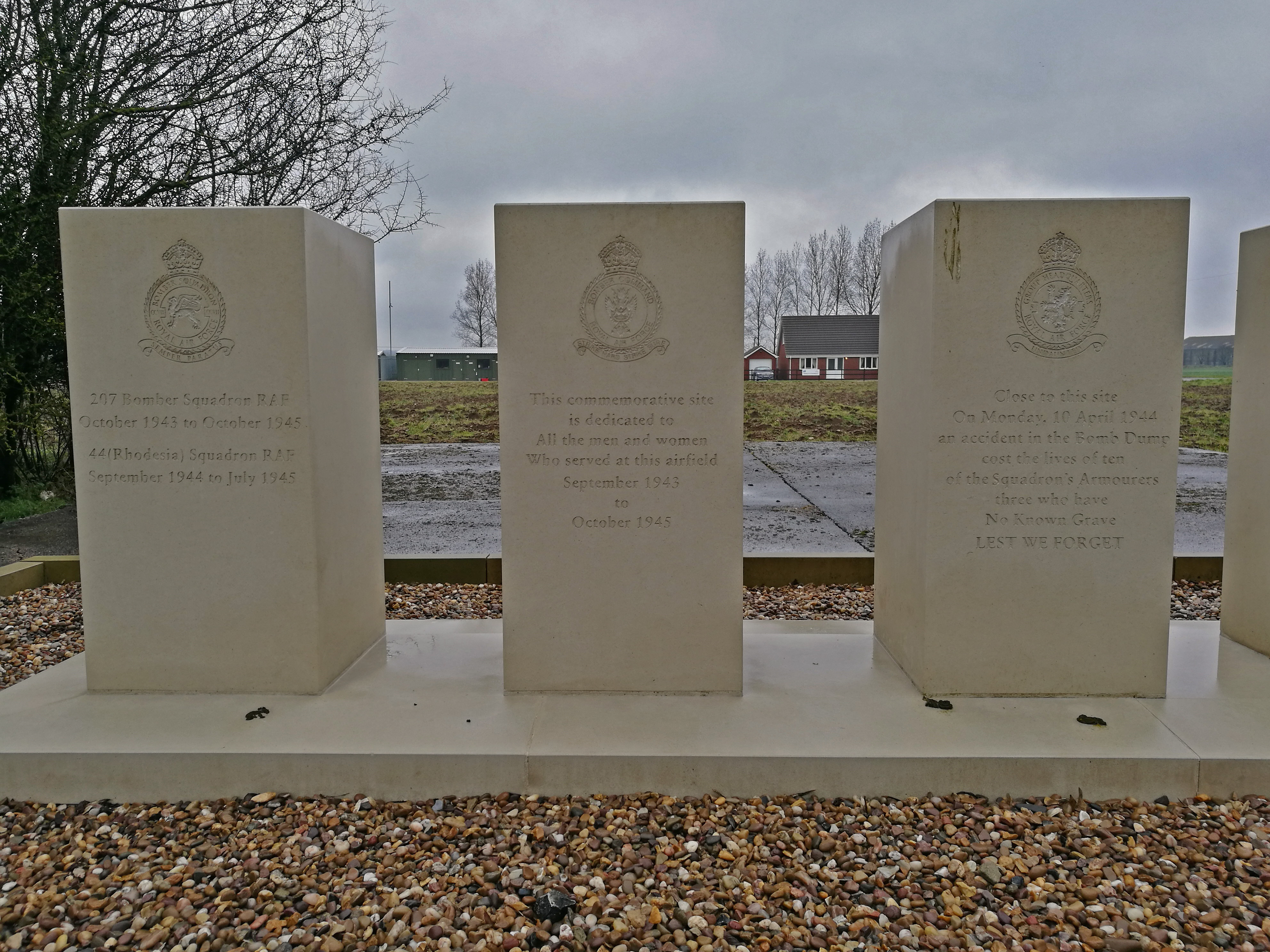
RAF Spilsby Memorial Columns

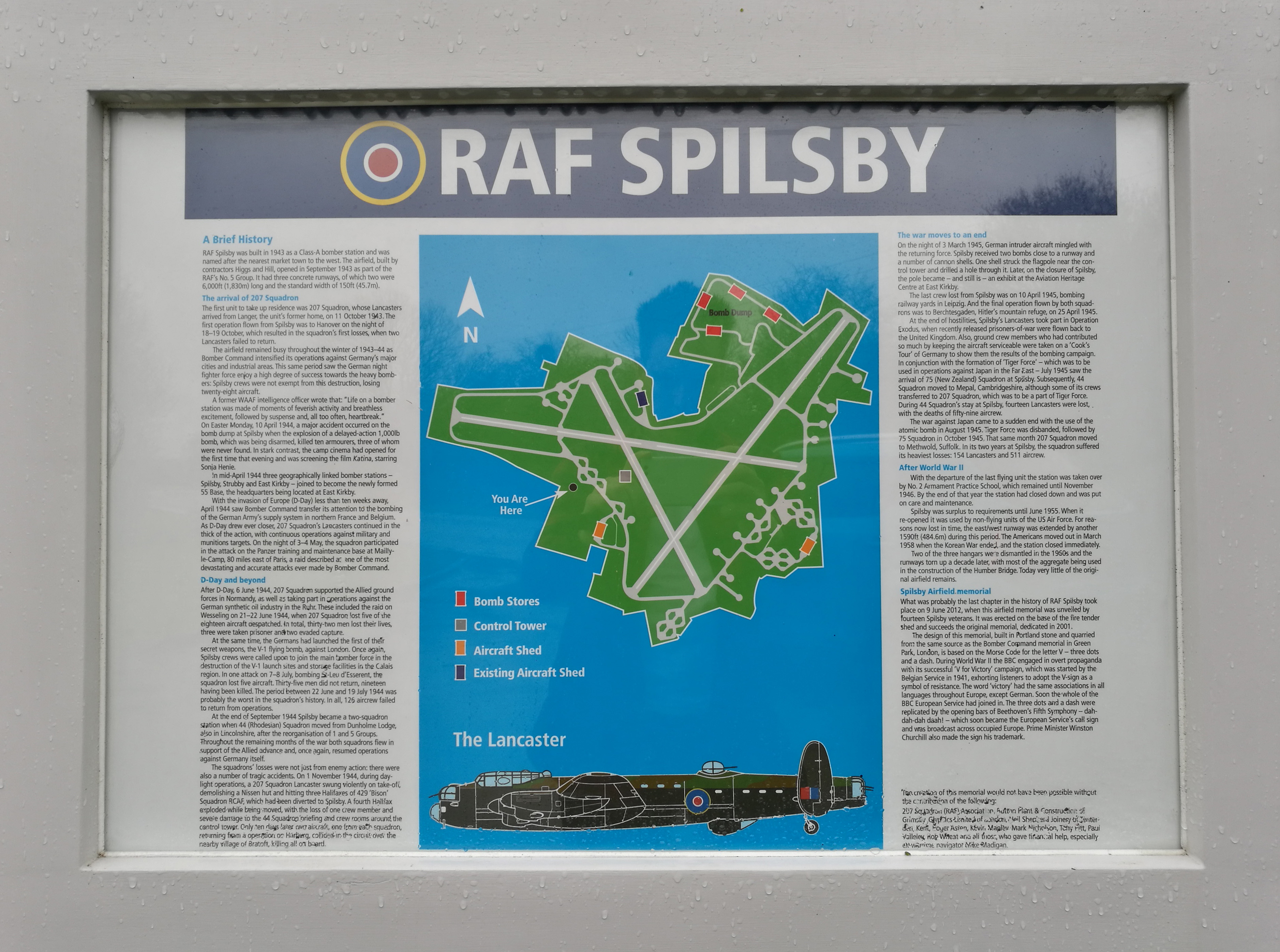
RAF Spilsby Memorial Information Board

== Surviving buildings ==
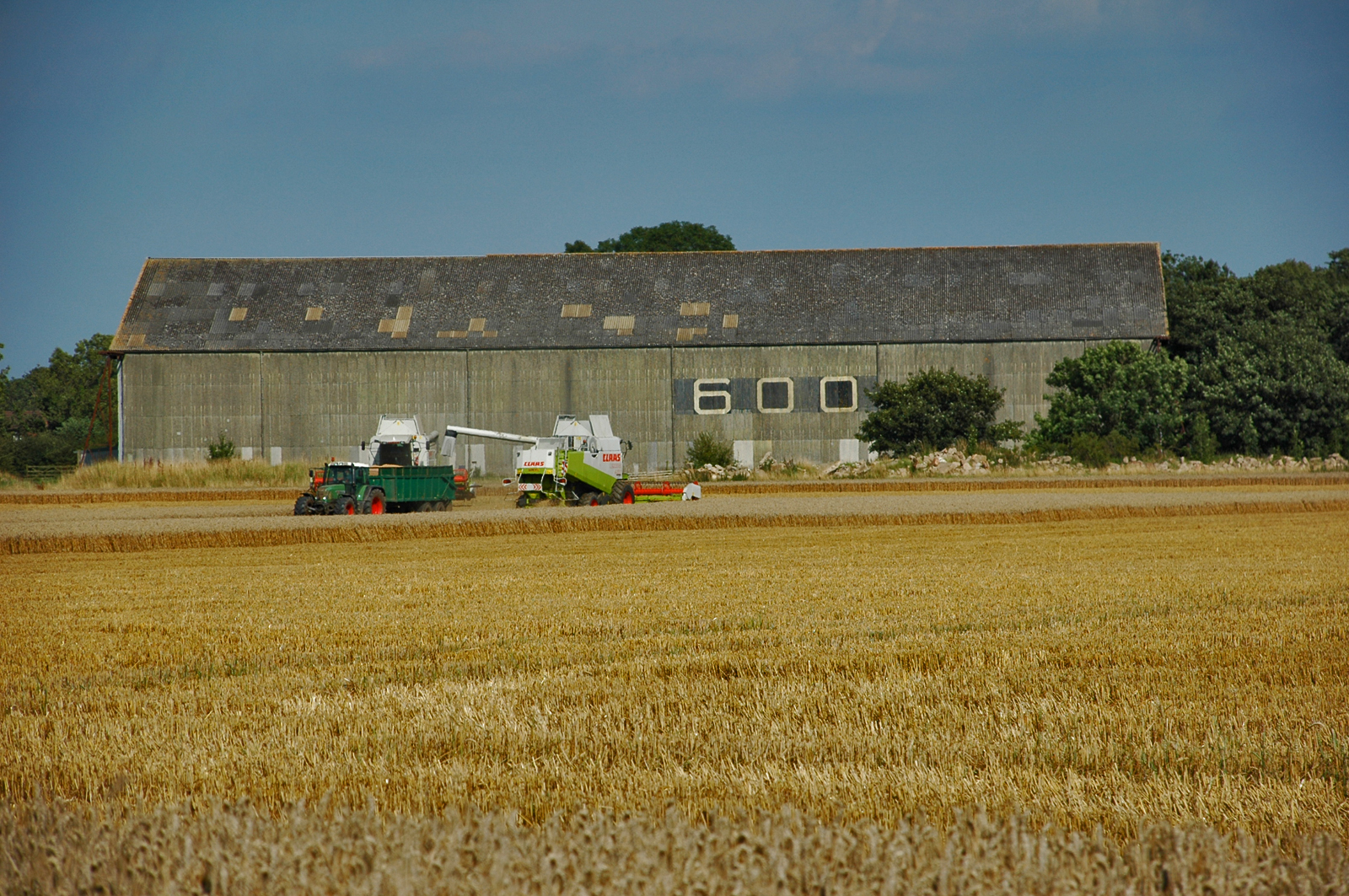
T2 hangar

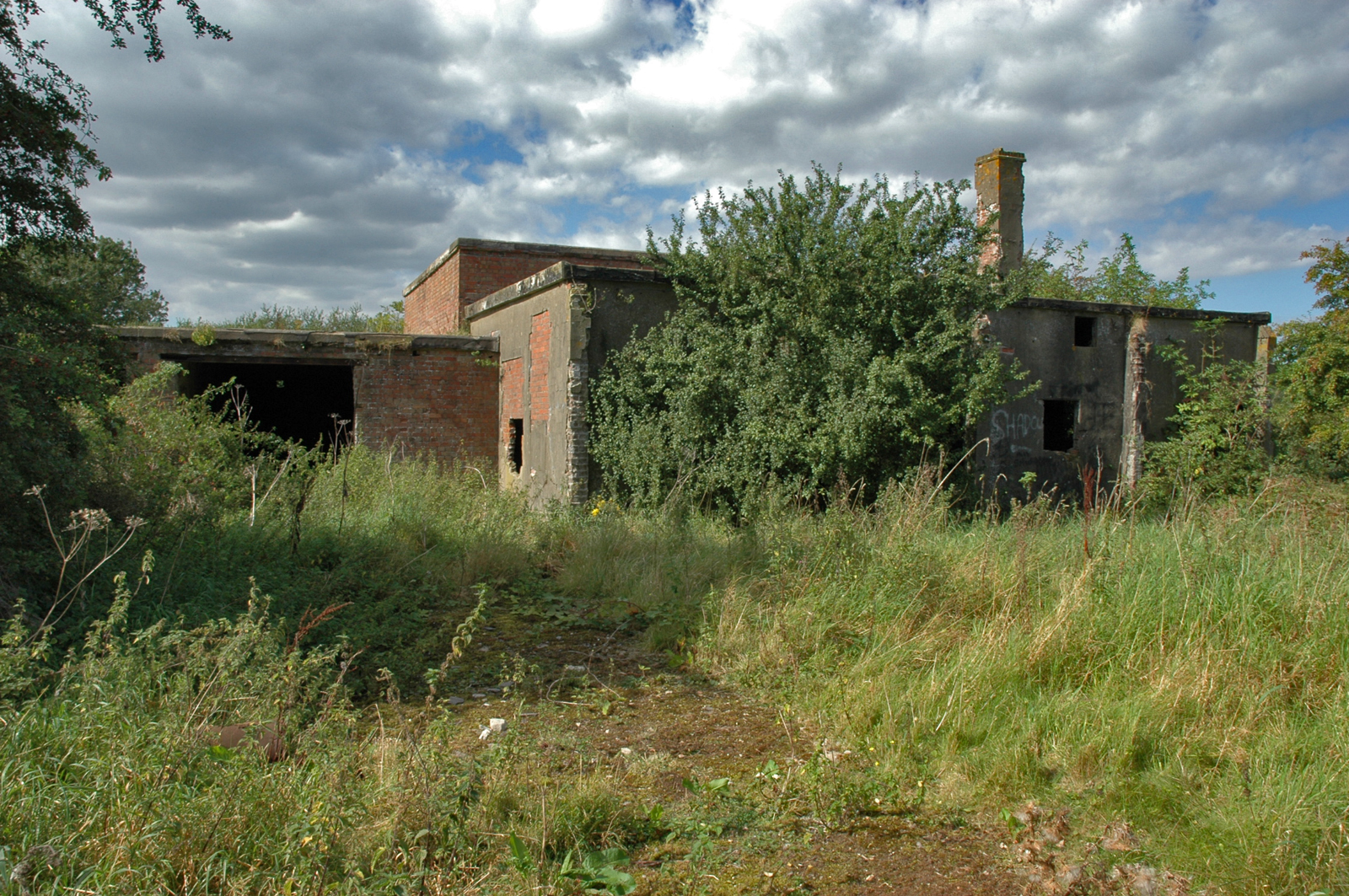
Operations block

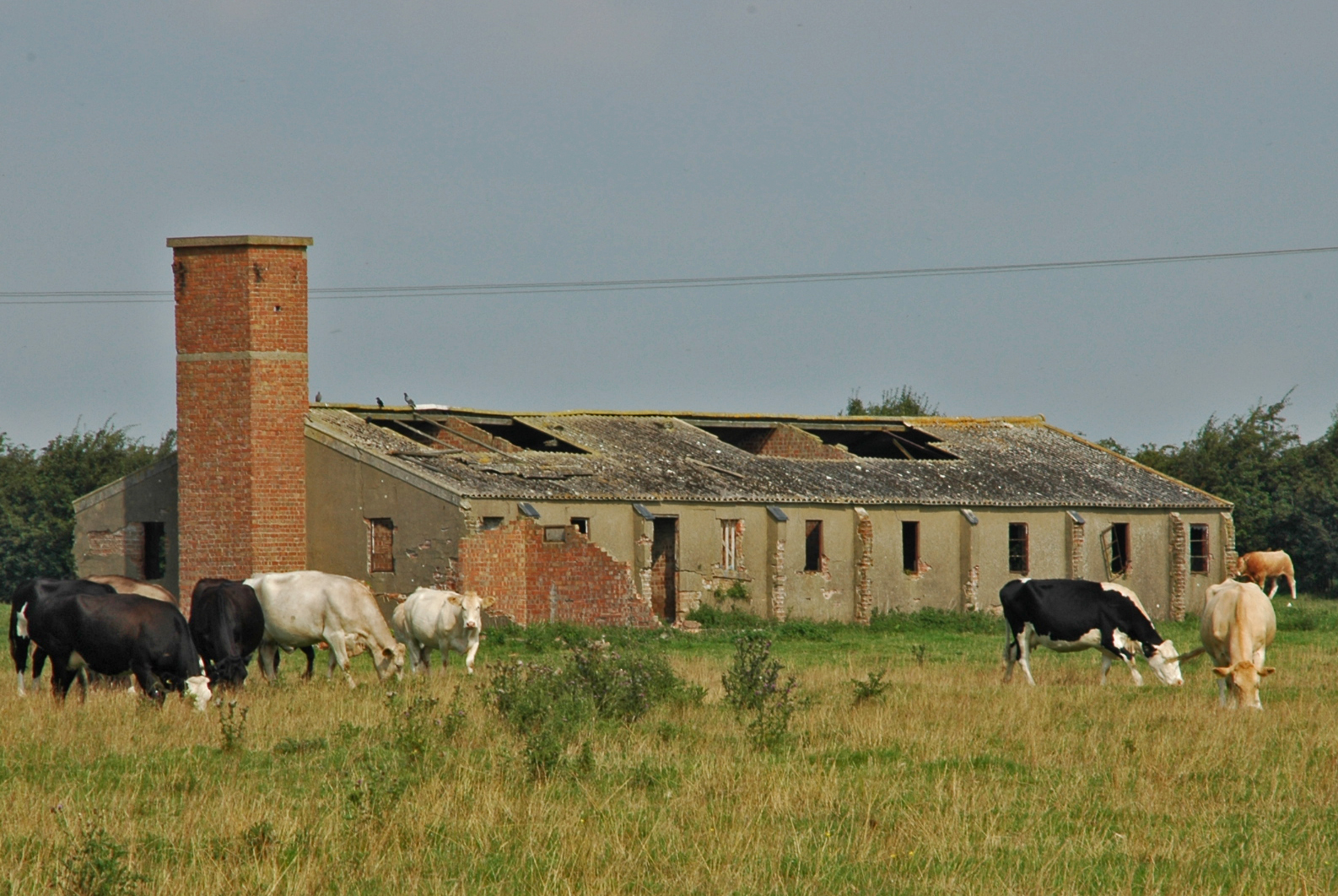
Ablutions building

== Units and aircraft based at Spilsby ==
Unit	Dates	Aircraft	Variant	Notes
No. 29 Squadron RAF	1946	de Havilland Mosquito	XXX	
No. 44 (Rhodesia) Squadron RAF	1945	Avro Lancaster	I and III	
No. 65 (East India) Squadron RAF	1945	Supermarine Spitfire	LF16E	
No. 75 (New Zealand) Squadron RAF	1945	Avro Lancaster	I and III	New Zealand manned squadron
No. 75 (New Zealand) Squadron RAF	1945	Avro Lincoln	B2	Disbanded and transferred to the Royal New Zealand Air Force
No. 129 (Mysore) Squadron RAF	1946	Supermarine Spitfire	IXE	
No. 207 Squadron RAF	1943–1945	Avro Lancaster	I and III	
No. 219 (Mysore) Squadron RAF	1946	de Havilland Mosquito	XXX	
No. 222 (Natal) Squadron RAF	1946	Gloster Meteor	F3	
No. 264 (Madras Presidency) Squadron RAF	1946	de Havilland Mosquito	NF30	
USAF	1955	B-52		Moved to RAF Mildenhall in March 1958

== See also ==
- List of former Royal Air Force stations
