= No. 207 Squadron RAF =

Flying squadron of the Royal Air Force

- Official squadron badge for No. 207 Squadron RAF
- Active: 31 December 1916 – 1 April 1918 (RNAS); 1 April 1918 – 20 January 1920 (RAF); 1 February 1920 – 19 April 1940; 1 November 1940 – 1 March 1950; 4 June 1951 – 27 March 1956; 1 April 1956 – 1 May 1965; 3 February 1969 – 30 June 1984; 12 July 2002 – 13 January 2012; 1 August 2019 – present
- Country: United Kingdom
- Branch: Royal Air Force
- Type: Flying squadron
- Role: Operational conversion unit
- Part of: No. 1 Group (Air Combat)
- Home station: RAF Marham
- Nicknames: "Black Cat Squadron" (WW1) "City of Leicester" (After 1939)
- Mottos: Latin: Semper paratus ("Always prepared")
- Aircraft: Lockheed Martin F-35B Lightning
- Battle honours: Western Front, 1916–1918; Ypres, 1917*; Somme, 1918*; Amiens; Hindenburg Line*; Biscay Ports, 1941–1945; German Ports, 1941–1945*; Berlin, 1941–1945*; Ruhr, 1941–1945*; Baltic 1941–1945; Fortress Europe 1941–1944; France & Germany, 1944–1945*; Normandy, 1944*; Honours marked with an asterisk* are those emblazoned on the Squadron Standard

Commanders
- Current commander: Commander Ralph Wood RN
- Notable commanders: Arthur Tedder; Vashon James Wheeler

Insignia
- Squadron Badge heraldry: A winged lion statant Approved by King Edward VIII in May 1936.
- Squadron roundel
- Squadron Codes: 207 (Apr 1938 – Apr 1939); NJ (Apr 1939 – Sep 1939); EM (Nov 1939 – Mar 1950); D (1983–1984)

Number 207 Squadron is a historic bomber squadron and, latterly, a communications and flying training squadron of the Royal Air Force. It was announced on 5 July 2017 that No. 207 Squadron will again reform to become the Operational Conversion Unit for the UK F-35B Lightning Force and will return to RAF Marham in Norfolk where it was last based in 1965. No. 207 Squadron arrived at RAF Marham with six F-35Bs on 16 July 2019 before officially standing to on 1 August.

== History ==
=== Formation and World War I ===
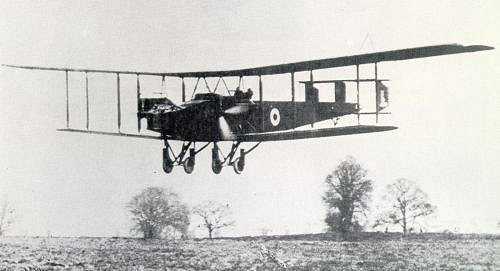
Handley Page O/400 bomber D8345 of No. 207 Squadron about to land at RAF Andover, May–June 1918.

The main contingent of No. 7 Squadron RNAS was formed from "B" Squadron of No. 4 Wing RNAS on 31 December 1916 at Petite-Synthe, France. However, it is noteworthy that an earlier contingent of the Squadron had previously formed in Kondoa Irangi, Tanganyika, in May 1916, flying Aéroplanes Voisins and Royal Aircraft Factory B.E.2cs for seven months on reconnaissance and bombing duties until disbanding there in January 1917, thus leaving the component in France to endure thereafter. Formed as a specialist night bomber squadron in France in December 1916, No. 7 RNAS flew its first missions on 3 February 1917, with four Short Bombers setting out against the Brugge (Bruges) docks. In April of that year it re-equipped with Handley Page O/100s, using them for night raids, including attacks against rail targets and ammunition dumps during the Second Battle of Ypres. During May and June 1917 the Squadron received eight Handley Page O/400s. The squadron then split into two in July 1917, with eight O/100s forming the initial equipment of 7A Squadron - later becoming 14 Squadron RNAS - while 7 Squadron continued with 10 O/100s and 8 O/400s.

On the formation of the Royal Air Force on 1 April 1918 it became No. 207 Squadron RAF, moving back to Netheravon in England for complete re-equipping with the more advanced version of the O/100, the Handley Page O/400, returning to France in July as part of No. 54 Wing and continuing to fly night raids against railway targets. It moved to Germany as part of the Army of Occupation in January 1919, serving there until August, when it handed its aircraft to No. 100 Squadron and returned to England, where it disbanded on 20 January 1920 at RAF Uxbridge.

=== Inter-war period ===
The squadron re-formed on 1 February 1920 at RAF Bircham Newton. Its Airco DH.9As saw service in Turkey in 1922, when it was deployed to Constantinople under the command of Arthur Tedder as part of the British intervention in the Greco-Turkish War (1919–1922); the Squadron returned to England in September 1923. It re-equipped with Fairey IIIFs in December 1927, and with the radial engined development of the IIIF, the Fairey Gordon in August 1932. In 1935, as a response to the Italian invasion of Ethiopia, it was sent to Sudan. The Gordon's Armstrong Siddeley Panther engine proved unreliable in desert conditions, however, and they were replaced with Vickers Vincents. The following year, the squadron, again re-equipped with Gordons, returned home to RAF Worthy Down, joining RAF Bomber Command. It re-equipped with Vickers Wellesleys in 1937, only for them to be replaced with Fairey Battles early the following year. Based at RAF Cottesmore, the squadron took the role of an Operational Training Unit.

=== Second World War ===
On 19 April 1940, the squadron's training role was assumed by No. 12 Operational Training Unit (OTU), allowing No. 207 Squadron to re-form on 1 November of that year as part of Bomber Command's No. 5 Group. At RAF Waddington, the squadron's crews were assigned the task of introducing the ill-fated Avro Manchester into service. Later moving to RAF Bottesford, the Manchesters were replaced by the much improved Avro Lancaster in March 1942. The squadron relocated to RAF Langar on 21 September, owing to the Bottesford runway surface breaking up and needing urgent repairs. In October 1943, No. 207 Squadron became the first occupant of the newly opened RAF Spilsby bomber station.

The squadron was scheduled to form part of the Tiger Force against Imperial Japan. With the dropping of the atomic bombs on Hiroshima and Nagasaki the Tiger Force plans were dropped and in November 1945, No. 207 Squadron relocated to RAF Methwold in Norfolk.

=== Cold War (1946–1984) ===
==== Bombing role (1946–1965) ====
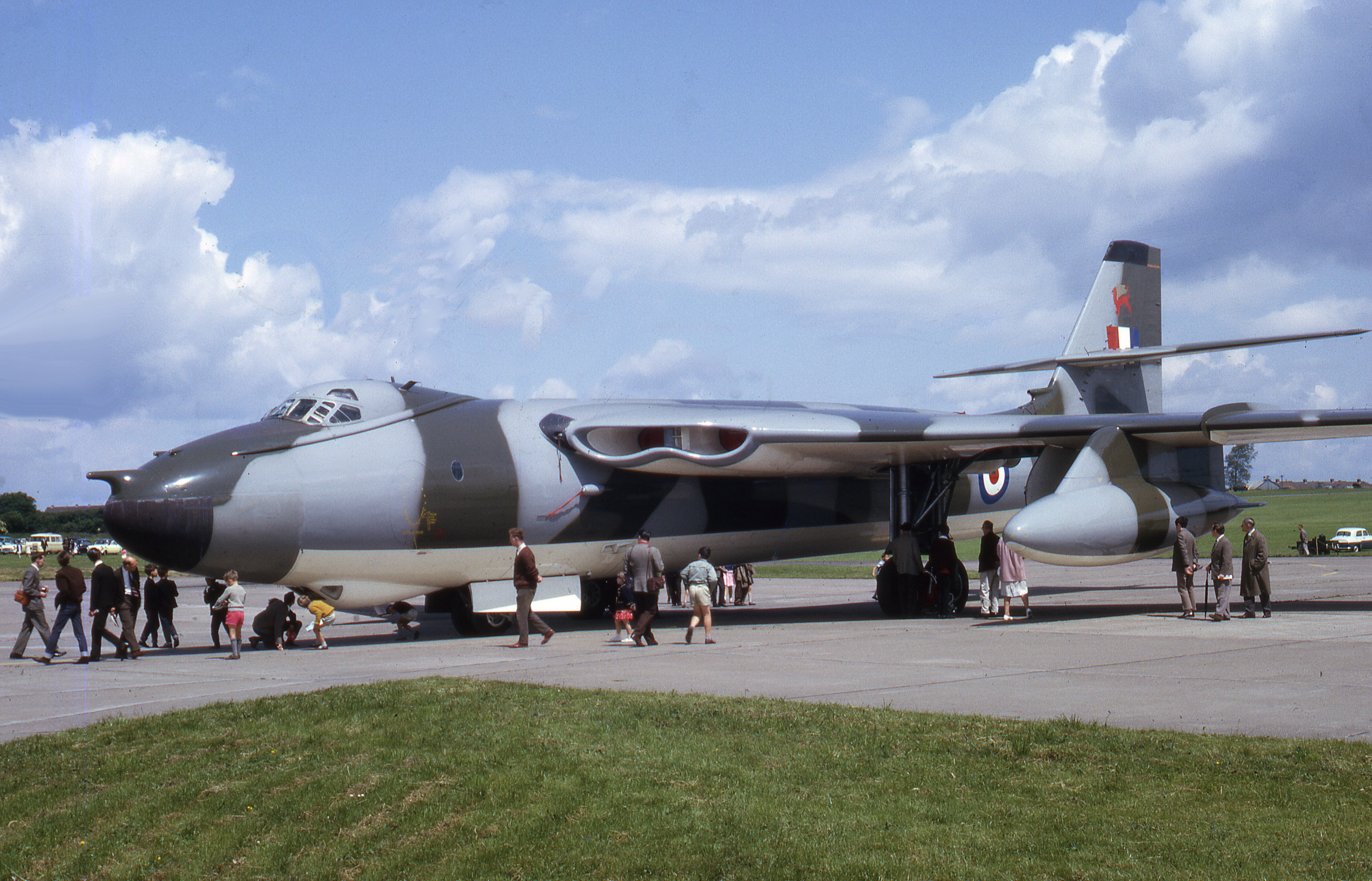
Vickers Valiant B.1 of No. 207 Squadron at Filton Airport, Bristol, in the 1960s.

After moving to RAF Mildenhall in 1949 and briefly replacing the Lancaster with the Avro Lincoln, the Squadron was disbanded on 1 March 1950. Re-formed on 4 June 1951 at RAF Marham, No. 207 Squadron flew the Boeing Washington B.1 until March 1954, when it was replaced by the English Electric Canberra, which remained in service with the squadron until it disbanded on 27 March 1956.

On 1 April 1956, the squadron re-formed again at RAF Marham and was now equipped with the Vickers Valiant B.1. In October the same year, No. 207 Squadron deployed to RAF Luqa, Malta, to take part in the Suez Campaign, flying 11 sorties over Egypt between October and November. On 1 May 1965, the squadron disbanded with the grounding of the Valiant fleet.

==== Communications role (1969–1984) ====
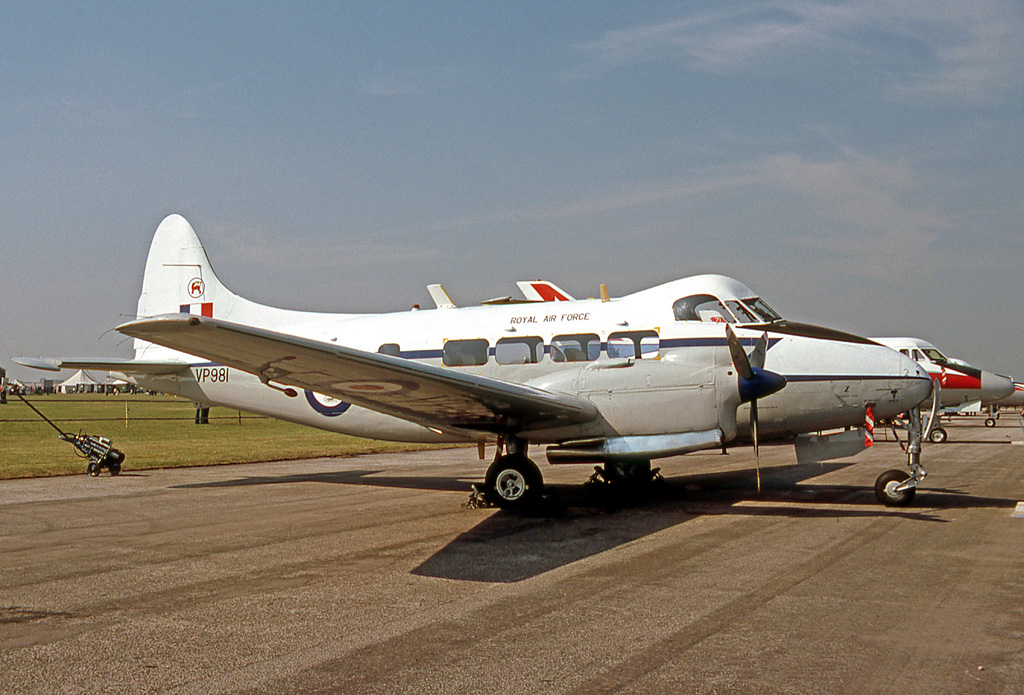
de Havilland Devon C.2 VP981 of No. 207 Squadron, 1977.

No. 207 Squadron was re-formed on 3 February 1969 at RAF Northolt by redesignating the Strike Command Communications Squadron, which had been until 1 January 1969 the Southern Communications Squadron based at RAF Bovingdon. It was equipped with Devon C.2s, Basset CC.1s and Pembroke C.1s, with the squadron first retiring the Bassets in 1974, and its last Pembroke being transferred to No. 60 Squadron in Germany in November 1975, leaving No. 207 Squadron with 14 Devons. Detachments of the squadron were located at RAF Wyton and RAF Turnhouse. No. 207 Squadron was once more disbanded on retirement of the remaining Devons on 30 June 1984, VP952 ending up at the RAF Museum St Athan. In its last years it was part of No. 1 Group.

=== Tucano (2002–2012) ===
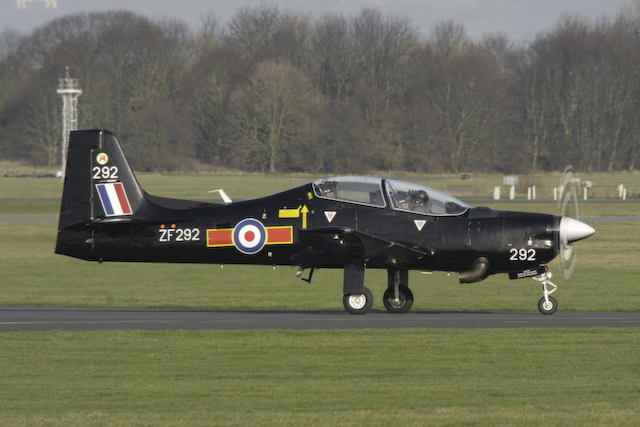
Tucano T1 ZF292 of No. 207 (Reserve) Squadron landing at RAF Linton-on-Ouse after Squadron disbandment flypast, 13 January 2012.

On 12 July 2002, one of the Flying Training Squadrons operating Short Tucano T.1s at No. 1 Flying Training School, RAF Linton-on-Ouse, was renumbered as No. 207 (Reserve) Squadron. Tasked with Basic Fast Jet Training, the squadron provided training for both RAF and Royal Navy students – including Prince William, Duke of Cambridge, who was part of the squadron in 2008.

The squadron was later disbanded on 13 January 2012 as a result of the 2010 Strategic Defence and Security Review. The squadron's Standard was laid up at Lincoln Cathedral on 3 October 2013.

=== F-35 Lightning (2019–present) ===
On 5 July 2017, it was announced by the Chief of the Air Staff, Air Chief Marshal Stephen Hillier at RAF Marham that No. 207 Squadron would be the Operational Conversion Unit for the Lockheed Martin F-35B Lightning, being chosen due to its heritage as both a RNAS and RAF unit.

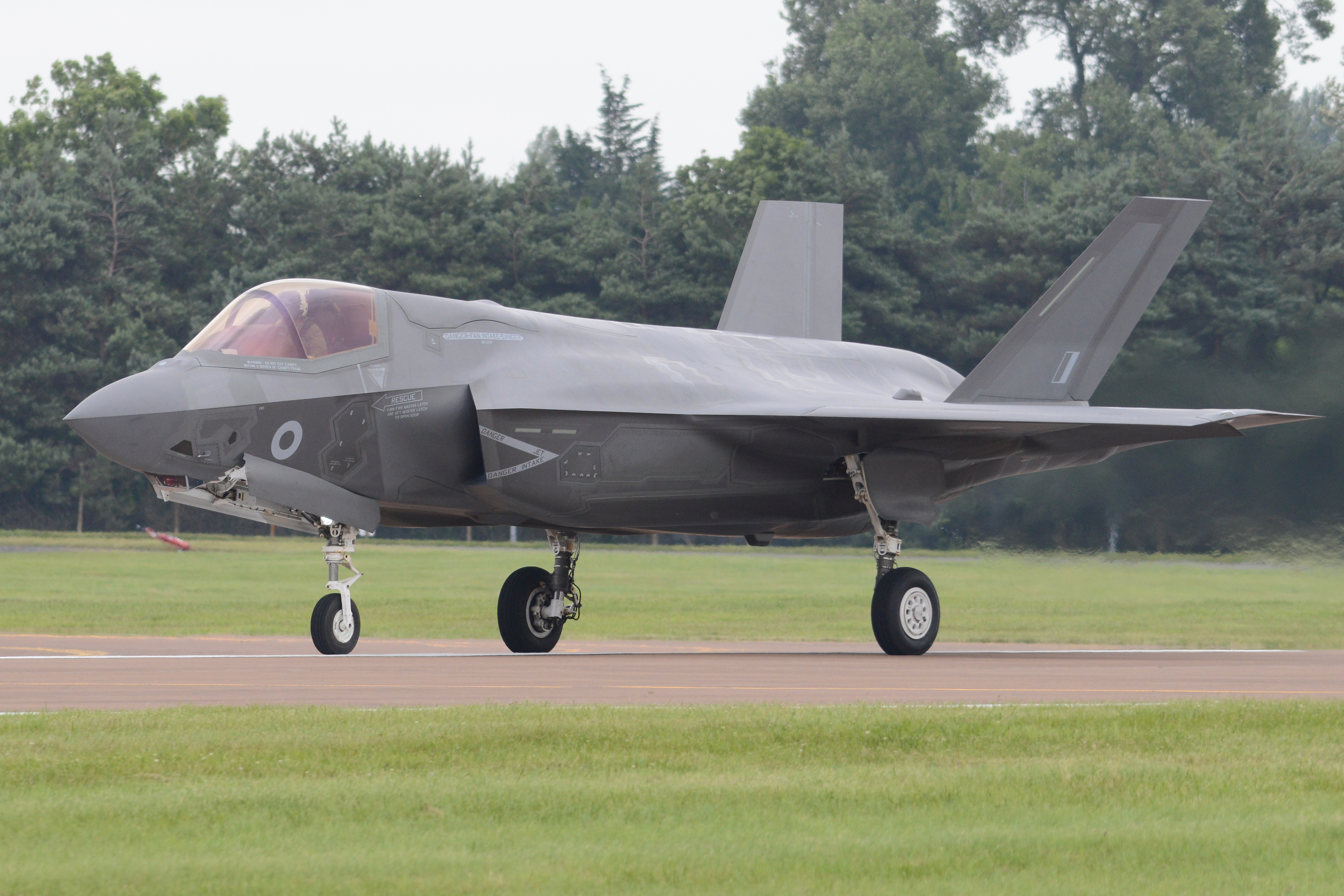
Lockheed Martin F-35B Lightning ZM137 at RIAT, 2016, this aircraft was delivered to Marham in July 2019.

No. 207 Squadron arrived at RAF Marham from MCAS Beaufort on 16 July 2019 with six Lockheed Martin F-35B Lightnings (ZM137, ZM139, ZM149, ZM150, ZM151 and ZM152) shortly before its reformation date of 1 August. No. 207 Squadron made their first sortie from Marham on 29 July. Wing Commander Scott Williams is the new squadron's first Officer Commanding who raised the squadron pennant when it stood up on 1 August. On 28 January 2020, No. 207 Squadron became the first UK unit in a decade to operate jets in home waters from a British carrier – flying from HMS Queen Elizabeth.

On 17 November 2021 a Royal Air Force F-35B, identified as ZM152, crashed during routine operations from HMS Queen Elizabeth. Early reports suggested some of "the covers and engine blanks" had not been removed before takeoff. The wreckage, which had broken into multiple pieces, including all security sensitive equipment, was largely recovered with the assistance of U.S. and Italian forces.

In June 2025, the UK announced plans to procure 12 F-35A aircraft, as part of NATO's dual-capable aircraft programme, restoring the UK's airborne nuclear strike capability. They will be capable of carrying both conventional and American tactical nuclear weapons. On day-to-day operations, these will be used in a training role as part of the squadron.

== Aircraft operated ==
Aircraft operated include:

- Voisin III (June 1916 – Jan 1917)
- Royal Aircraft Factory B.E.2 (June 1916 – Jan 1917)
- Caudron G.4 (Dec 1916)
- Sopwith 1½ Strutter (Dec 1916 – Apr 1917)
- Short Bomber (Dec 1916 – June 1917)
- Handley Page O/100 (Apr 1917 – Apr 1918)
- Handley Page O/400 (Apr 1918 – Aug 1919)
- Airco DH.9A (Feb 1920 – Dec 1927)
- Fairey IIIF (Dec 1927 – Sep 1932)
- Fairey Gordon Mk.I (Sep 1932 – Apr 1936)
- Vickers Vincent Mk.I (Apr 1936 – Aug 1936)
- Fairey Gordon Mk.I (Aug 1936 – Aug 1937)
- Vickers Wellesley (Aug 1937 – Apr 1938)
- Fairey Battle (Apr 1938 – Apr 1940)
- Avro Anson Mk.I (July 1939 – Apr 1940)
- Avro Manchester Mk.I (Nov 1940 – Mar 1942)
- Handley Page Hampden Mk.I (July 1941 – Aug 1941)
- Avro Lancaster Mk.I (Mar 1942 – Aug 1949)
- Avro Lancaster Mk.III (May 1943 – Dec 1947)
- Avro Lincoln B.2 (Aug 1949 – Mar 1950)
- Boeing Washington B.1 (July 1951 – Mar 1954)
- English Electric Canberra B.2 (Mar 1954 – Mar 1956)
- Vickers Valiant B.1 (July 1956 – Feb 1965)
- Beagle Basset CC.1 (Feb 1969 – May 1974)
- Percival Pembroke C.1 (Feb 1969 – Nov 1975)
- de Havilland Devon C.2 (Feb 1969 – June 1984)
- Short Tucano T.1 (July 2002 – Jan 2012)
- Lockheed Martin F-35B Lightning (July 2019 – present)

== Squadron bases ==
Bases and airfields used by No. 7 Squadron RNAS and No. 207 Squadron RAF, data from
| From | To | Base | Remark |
|---|---|---|---|
| June 1916 | 12 January 1917 | Kondoa Irangi, Tanganyika | 1st no. 7 RNAS |
| 31 December 1916 | 4 April 1917 | Petite-Synthe, France | 2nd no 7 RNAS |
| 4 April 1918 | 22 April 1918 | Coudekerque, France | 1 April 1918 as No. 207 Squadron RAF |
| 22 April 1918 | 13 May 1918 | RAF Netheravon, Wiltshire | |
| 13 May 1918 | 7 June 1918 | RAF Andover, Hampshire | |
| 7 June 1918 | 26 October 1918 | Ligescourt, France | |
| 26 October 1918 | 1 December 1918 | Estrées-en-Chaussée, France | |
| 1 December 1918 | 1 January 1919 | Carvin, France | |
| 1 January 1919 | 10 May 1919 | Merheim, Germany | |
| 10 May 1919 | 23 August 1919 | Hangelar, Germany | Present Bonn-Hangelar airfield |
| 23 August 1919 | 8 October 1919 | RAF Tangmere, West Sussex | |
| 8 October 1919 | 16 January 1920 | RAF Croydon, Surrey | |
| 16 January 1920 | 20 January 1920 | RAF Uxbridge, Middlesex | |
| 1 February 1920 | 29 September 1922 | RAF Bircham Newton, Norfolk | |
| 29 September 1922 | 11 October 1922 | | en route to Turkey |
| 11 October 1922 | 22 September 1923 | San Stephano, Turkey | |
| 22 September 1923 | 3 October 1923 | | en route to UK |
| 3 October 1923 | 7 November 1929 | RAF Eastchurch, Kent | |
| 7 November 1929 | 4 October 1935 | RAF Bircham Newton, Norfolk | |
| 4 October 1935 | 20 October 1935 | | en route to Sudan |
| 20 October 1935 | 28 October 1935 | Port Sudan, Sudan | |
| 28 October 1935 | 6 April 1936 | Ed Damer, Sudan | |
| 6 April 1936 | 14 August 1936 | Gebeit, Sudan | |
| 14 August 1936 | 29 August 1936 | | en route to UK |
| 29 August 1936 | 20 April 1938 | RAF Worthy Down, Hampshire | |
| 20 April 1938 | 24 August 1939 | RAF Cottesmore, Rutland | |
| 24 August 1939 | 9 December 1939 | RAF Cranfield, Bedfordshire | |
| 9 December 1939 | 5 April 1940 | RAF Cottesmore, Rutland | |
| 5 April 1940 | 19 April 1940 | RAF Cranfield, Bedfordshire | Merged here into no. 12 OTU |
| 1 November 1940 | 17 November 1941 | RAF Waddington, Lincolnshire | |
| 17 November 1941 | 20 September 1942 | RAF Bottesford, Leicestershire | Det. at RAF Syerston, Nottinghamshire 24 August 1942 |
| 20 September 1942 | 12 October 1943 | RAF Langar, Nottinghamshire | |
| 12 October 1943 | 30 October 1945 | RAF Spilsby, Lincolnshire | |
| 30 October 1945 | 29 April 1946 | RAF Methwold, Norfolk | |
| 29 April 1946 | 8 November 1946 | RAF Tuddenham, Suffolk | |
| 8 November 1946 | 28 February 1949 | RAF Stradishall, Suffolk | |
| 28 February 1949 | 1 March 1950 | RAF Mildenhall, Suffolk | |
| 4 June 1951 | 27 March 1956 | RAF Marham, Norfolk | Washington-Canberra period |
| 1 April 1956 | 1 May 1965 | RAF Marham, Norfolk | Vickers Vailant period |
| 3 February 1969 | 30 June 1984 | RAF Northolt, Middlesex | Dets. at RAF Wyton, Cambridgeshire and RAF Turnhouse, Edinburgh |
| 12 July 2002 | 13 January 2012 | RAF Linton-on-Ouse, Yorkshire | |
| 16 July 2019 | Present | RAF Marham, Norfolk | Squadron personnel return from MCAS Beaufort, SC USA |

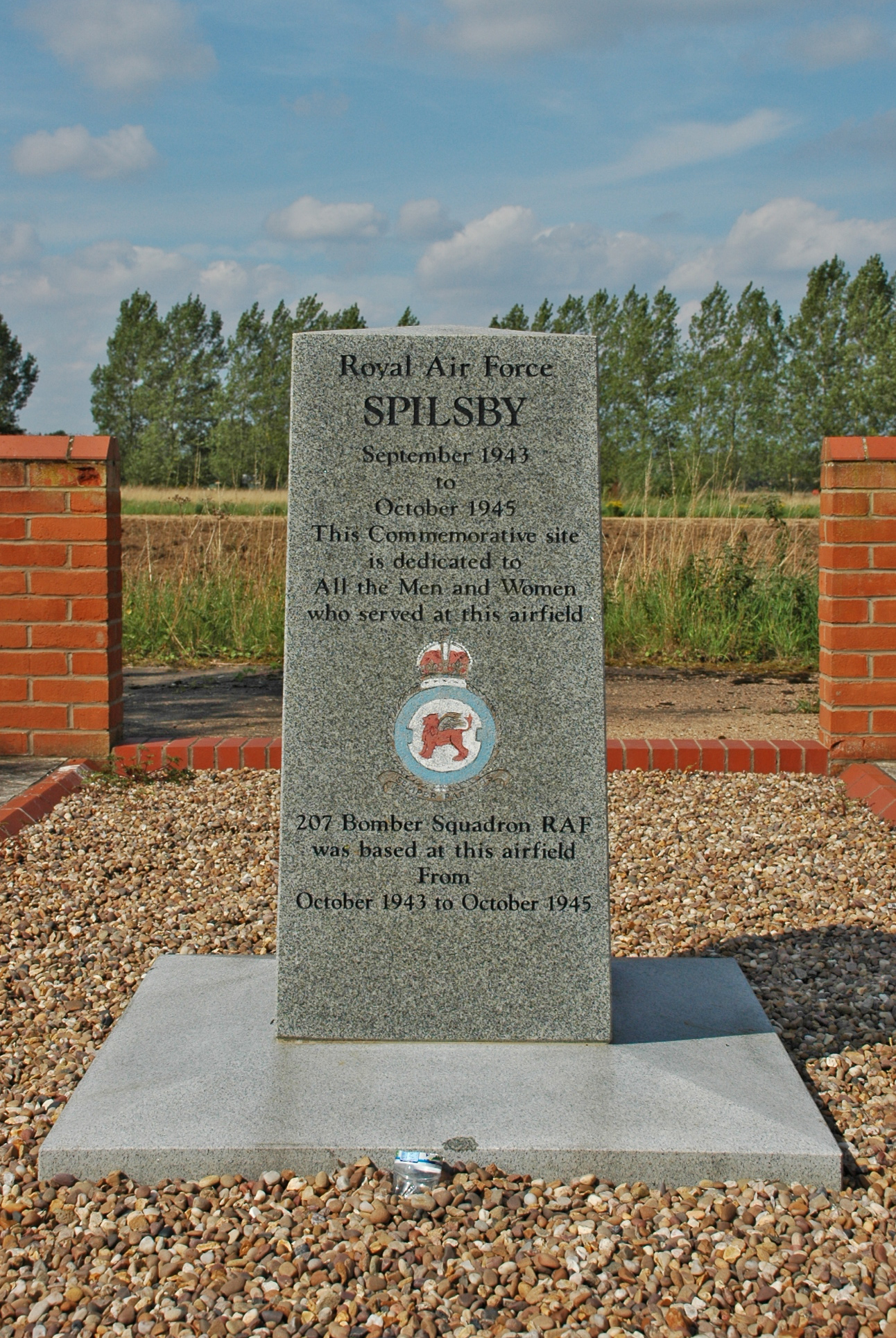
RAF Spilsby 207 memorial on the airfield

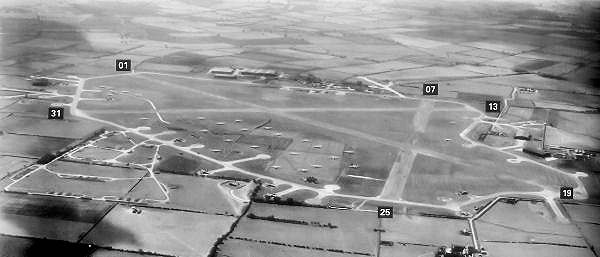
Langar Airfield, England, September 1943

== See also ==
- List of Royal Air Force aircraft squadrons
