= RAF Sylt =

Former RAF station in Germany

RAF Sylt B.170 Westerland
- Sylt, Schleswig-Holstein in Germany

Site information
- Type: Royal Air Force station
- Owner: Air Ministry
- Operator: Royal Air Force
- Controlled by: Royal Air Force Germany

Location
- Shown within Schleswig-Holstein, Germany RAF Sylt (Germany)
- Coordinates: 54°54′48″N 008°20′26″E

Site history
- Built: 1945
- In use: 1945 - 16 October 1961
- Fate: Handed over to the German Air Force

Airfield information
- Elevation: 16 metres (52 ft) AMSL
Runways
Direction	Length and surface
06/24	Asphalt
14/32	Asphalt

Royal Air Force Sylt or more simply RAF Sylt is a former Royal Air Force station located near Sylt, Schleswig-Holstein, Germany.

The site was renamed from B.170 Westerland to RAF Sylt on 27 September 1945.

== History ==
The following squadrons were posted here at some point:

- No. 2 Squadron RAF
- No. 3 Squadron RAF
- No. 4 Squadron RAF
- No. 14 Squadron RAF
- No. 16 Squadron RAF
- No. 21 Squadron RAF
- No. 26 (South African) Squadron RAF
- No. 33 Squadron RAF
- No. 41 Squadron RAF
- No. 56 Squadron RAF
- No. 69 Squadron RAF
- No. 80 Squadron RAF
- No. 107 Squadron RAF
- No. 302 (City of Poznan) Polish Fighter Squadron
- No. 305 (Ziemia Wielkopolska) Polish Bomber Squadron
- No. 308 "City of Kraków" Polish Fighter Squadron
- No. 317 "City of Wilno" Polish Fighter Squadron
- No. 349 (Belgian) Squadron RAF
- No. 350 (Belgian) Squadron RAF
- No. 411 (Grizzly Bear) Squadron RCAF
- No. 412 (Falcon) Squadron RCAF
- No. 24 Armament Practice Camp RAF
- Training Squadron, RAF Sylt
- Armament Training Flight
- Armament Practice Station, Sylt:
  - Target Towing Squadron with Gloster Meteor TT.8s
  - Weapons Training Flight with de Havilland Vampire T.11s
  - Station Flight with ASR Bristol Sycamore & a Avro Anson C.19

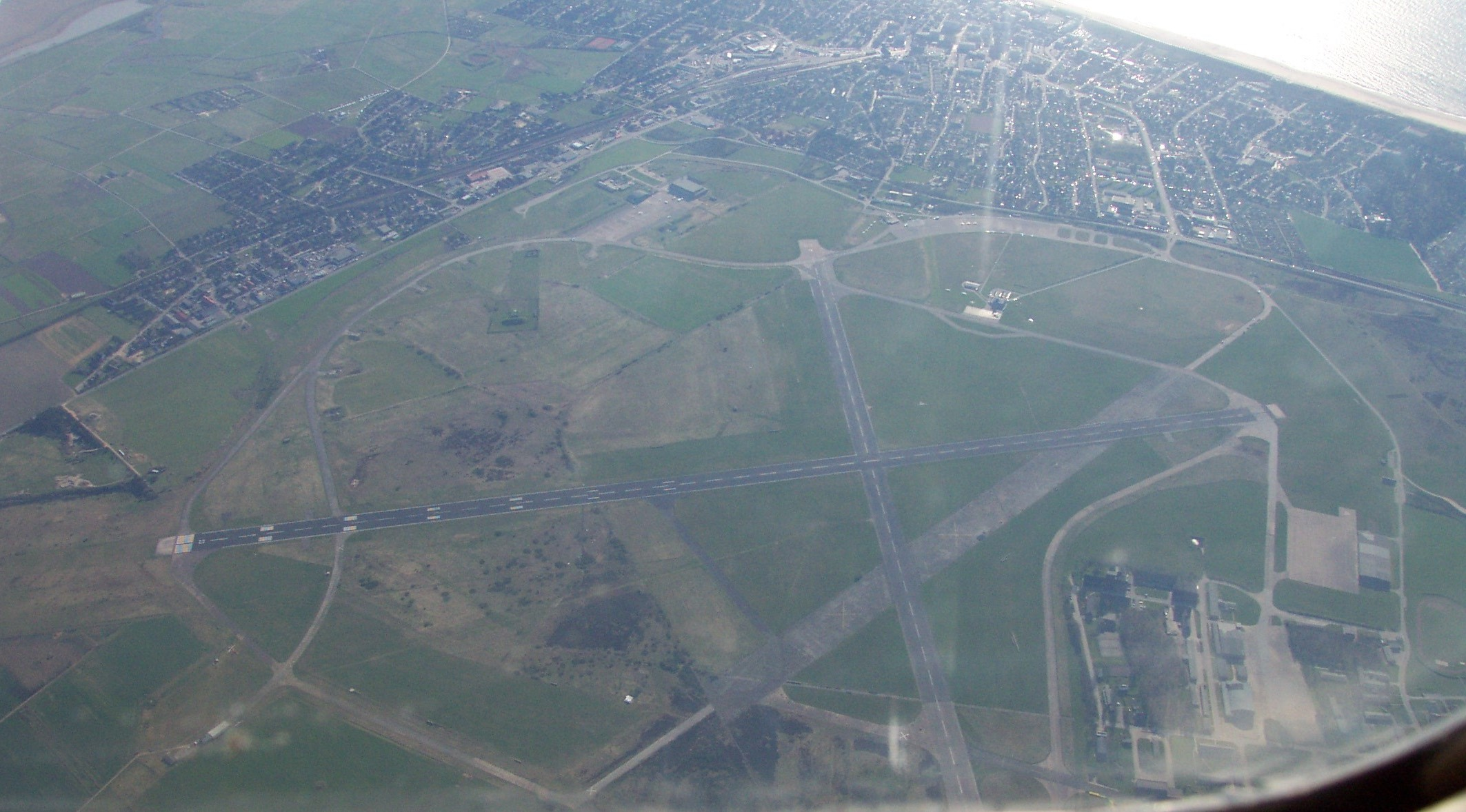
Modern day image of the airfield

== Current use ==
This site is now Sylt Airport.

== See also ==
- Royal Air Force Germany
- List of former Royal Air Force stations
