= RAF Hutton Cranswick =

Royal Air Force base in Yorkshire, England

RAF Hutton Cranswick
- Hutton Cranswick, East Riding of Yorkshire in England
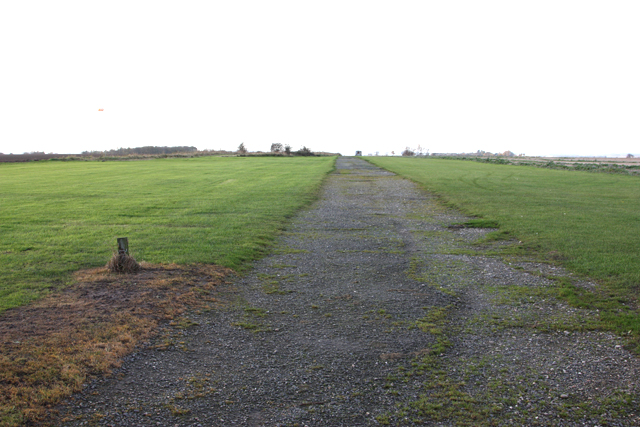
- Landing strip of the former airfield

Site information
- Type: Royal Air Force station parent station 1942-46
- Code: CK
- Owner: Air Ministry
- Operator: Royal Air Force
- Controlled by: RAF Fighter Command * No. 12 Group RAF

Location
- Shown within East Riding of Yorkshire RAF Hutton Cranswick (the United Kingdom)
- Coordinates: 53.94906°N 0.46185°W

Site history
- Built: 1941/42
- In use: January 1942 - June 1946
- Battles/wars: European theatre of World War II

Airfield information
- Elevation: 33 metres (108 ft) AMSL
Runways
Direction	Length and surface
E/W	1,510 metres (4,954 ft) Concrete
00/00	1,210 metres (3,970 ft) Concrete
00/00	1,010 metres (3,314 ft) Concrete

Royal Air Force Hutton Cranswick or more simply RAF Hutton Cranswick is a former Royal Air Force station located to the south of Driffield and immediately south west of the village of Hutton Cranswick in the East Riding of Yorkshire, England. The station was developed as a fighter base with many Spitfire fighter squadrons passing through. It was used by the Royal Air Force, the Royal Canadian Air Force (RCAF), and several Polish Fighter Squadrons of the RAF. It was opened in 1942, and disposed of in 1946.

== History ==
RAF Hutton Cranswick opened in January 1942 as a fighter airfield within No. 12 Group RAF. No. 4 Group of Bomber Command had recently taken over RAF Leconfield to the south, which had previously been a Fighter Command asset, so Hutton Cranswick was developed for the fighter element. Uncharacteristically for the time, its three runways were concreted from the beginning. Many Fighter Command airfields were initially built with grass runways which were later upgraded to concrete. The main runway was aligned east to west and was 4,950 feet (1,510 m) long. The other two intersecting runways which formed a V shape through the main runway, were 3,960 feet (1,210 m) (west side) and 3,330 feet (1,010 m) on the east side. Each runway was 50 yards (46 m) wide.

Fighter Command was renowned for rotating its squadrons through several bases in quick succession, and RAF Hutton Cranswick is a prime example of this. Many squadrons rotated through the airfield including; No. 1 Squadron RAF, 19, 168, 170, 195, 234 (Madras Presidency), 302 (City of Poznan), 306 (City of Torun), 308 (City of Kraków), 315 (City of Dęblin), 316 (City of Warsaw) squadron RAF, and 610 (County of Chester) Squadron AAF. In early 1943, several flights were posted into Hutton Cranswick, including No. 3 RAF Regiment Training School (which became No. 1634 Flight). This was moved from RAF Ronaldsway where targets were towed to train the RAF Regiment in anti-aircraft fire.

In September 1943, virtually the entire strength of squadron personnel were posted to Australia to form No. 549 Squadron RAF, and No. 234 reformed with new crews, which were posted to the south of England, by the end of 1943. From 1 December 1943, the Anti Aircraft Co-operation 291 Squadron was formed at the airfield for target towing and similar uses. No. 291 Squadron had been formed from 1613, 1629, and 1634 anti-aircraft co-operation flights, and its remit was to tow aerial targets for the anti-aircraft batteries on the east coast.

In December 1943, No. 26 (South African) Squadron RAF arrived from Church Fenton. The squadron first departed for RAF Scorton, but returned, then left for RAF Peterhead, returning again in April 1944 (from RAF Ayr), and finally left Hutton Cranswick for good on 28 April 1944 for Lee-on-Solent.

Whilst in use by 291 other fighter squadrons continued to rotate through including 401, 403, 412, 441, 442, 443 (all flying Supermarine Spitfires) and 439 using Hawker Typhoons. The final unit to operate from Hutton Cranswick was No. 124 (Baroda) Squadron RAF using Spitfire IXs.

Hutton Cranswick was used by No. 16 Armament Practice Camp RAF for about a year until it finally closed in mid 1946.

== Units ==
A number of other units also used the airfield:

Squadrons and Units based at RAF Hutton Cranswick 1942–1946
Unit	Dates	Details	Ref
No. 1 Squadron RAF	23 July 1945 – 30 April 1946	Arrived from RAF Ludham, departed for RAF Tangmere	
No. 26 (South African) Squadron RAF	31 December 1943 – 28 April 1944	Arrived from RAF Church Fenton, departed for Lee-on-Solent	
No. 234 (Madras Presidency) Squadron RAF	15 October–31 December 1943	Reformed at Hutton Cranswick, departed for RAF Church Fenton	
No. 288 Squadron RAF	July 1945–24 May 1946	Arrived from RAF Church Fenton, departed for RAF East Moor	
No. 291 Squadron RAF	1 December 1943 – 26 June 1945	Formed from several flights (1610, 1629, 1634)	
No. 403 Squadron RCAF	24–29 February 1944	Training at No. 16 Armament Practice Camp	
No. 421 Squadron RCAF	2–9 March 1944	Training at No. 16 Armament Practice Camp	
No. 441 Squadron RCAF	12–23 May 1944	Training at No. 16 Armament Practice Camp	
No. 610 (County of Chester) Squadron AAF	14 January 1942 – 4 April 1942	Arrived from RAF Leconfield, departed for RAF Ludham	

- No. 123 Airfield Headquarters RAF (1943)
- No. 2 (Coastal) Operational Training Unit RAF
- No. 2 Tactical Exercise Unit RAF
- No. 4 Aircraft Delivery Flight RAF
- No. 6 Anti-Aircraft Co-operation Unit RAF
- No. 8 Fighter Command Servicing Unit RAF
- No. 13 Fighter Command Servicing Unit RAF
- 885 Naval Air Squadron
- No. 1489 (Fighter) Gunnery Flight RAF
- No. 1495 (Target Towing) Flight RAF
- No. 1613 (Anti-Aircraft Co-operation) Flight RAF
- No. 1629 (Anti-Aircraft Co-operation) Flight RAF
- No. 1634 (Anti-Aircraft Co-operation) Flight RAF
- No. 2731 Squadron RAF Regiment
- No. 2739 Squadron RAF Regiment
- No. 2805 Squadron RAF Regiment

== Post closure ==
In April 1964, an English Electric Lightning F.2 tried to effect an emergency landing at Hutton Cranswick due to fuel shortage and systems failure. The aircraft's home base was at RAF Leconfield, just to the south, however, it was unable to reach that airfield safely. The aircraft missed the runway by 300 metres (980 ft) and the pilot was killed in the crash.

The site is now used for farming and light industrial work, whilst the control tower has been converted into a private residence, and the airfield battle headquarters bunker still remains in a field behind the old control tower.
