= HMS Fieldfare =

Former Royal Naval Air station in Ross and Cromarty, Scotland

HMS Fieldfare RNAS Evanton RAF Evanton RAF Novar
- Novar Aerodrome
- Evanton, Ross and Cromarty, in Scotland

Site information
- Type: Royal Air Force station Royal Naval Air Station
- Owner: Admiralty; Air Ministry
- Operator: Royal Navy 1944-48; Royal Air Force
- Controlled by: Fleet Air Arm; RAF Bomber Command; RAF Coastal Command
- Condition: Disused

Location
- Shown within Ross and Cromarty HMS Fieldfare (the United Kingdom)
- Coordinates: 57°39′58″N 004°18′27″W

Site history
- Built: 1922
- In use: 1922-1950
- Fate: Industry / Leisure
- Battles/wars: European theatre of World War II

Airfield information
- Elevation: 5 metres (16 ft) AMSL
Runways
Direction	Length and surface
04/22	914 metres (2,999 ft) Concrete
09/27	1,143 metres (3,750 ft) Concrete

HMS Fieldfare, also known as RAF Landing Ground Novar, then RNAS Evanton and later as RAF Evanton, is a disused airfield in Ross and Cromarty, Scotland. It lies on the shore of the Cromarty Firth near the village of Evanton. In the 1934 edition of the loose-leaf publication 'The Air Pilot' (3rd edition) published by The Air Ministry the field is designated as 'R.A.F. Landing Ground (Seasonal) Novar'. The name Novar was later changed to Evanton.

== History ==
An airfield was established on the site in 1922 to support the Royal Navy's Home Fleet, which had one of its main bases nearby at Invergordon. (Before arriving in port, aircraft carriers must fly off their aircraft to a land base: it is difficult or impossible for fixed wing aircraft to operate from a carrier while the ship is at anchor.) Originally, the navy used a site at Delny, near Invergordon, but it could not be enlarged for larger planes. At first, the airfield was known as the Novar base, after the Novar estate which owned the land. At the time naval aviation was in the hands of "The Fleet Air Arm of the RAF" and HMS Fieldfare was serviced from RAF Leuchars.

The dimensions of the'landing area' (1934 'The Air Pilot') were given as N–S 600 yards, NE–SW 700 yards, E–W 700 yards, SE–NW 500 yards. It was 20 ft (6 metres) asl, and grass covered. Six nearby radio masts were dismantled during the period Oct-April. Cattle were grazed on the landing area from approximately 15 June – 25 August.

In 1937 it was decided to expand the aerodrome and it became a flight and bombing training school. By the start of the Second World War the Home Fleet had moved to Scapa Flow in the Orkney Islands to be out of range of German Bombers.

On Empire Day 1939 78 RAF stations were opened to the public. RAF Evanton was the farthest north and attracted a mile long queue of cars and 9,000 visitors.

The airfield was shared by the RAF, to whom it was known as RAF Evanton. During the War it was used principally as a training base, particularly for the training of air gunners. By 1943 it was being used for Coastal Command maintenance and it later became storage yard with up to 250 aircraft. The Cromarty Firth was used as a seaplane base during the War and the RAF maintained a presence in Alness until at least the 1980s.

RAF Evanton was used for secret flights in the 1950s.

=== Units ===
Royal Air Force

- No. 4 (Coastal) Operational Training Unit (September 1944 – ?) target-towing and support aircraft only.
- Relief Landing Ground for No. 8 (Advanced) Flying Training School RAF (? – 30 September 1953)
- No. 8 Armament Training Camp RAF became No. 8 Armament Training Station RAF became No. 8 Air Observers School RAF became No. 8 Bombing and Gunnery School RAF became No. 8 Air Gunners School RAF
- Advanced Training Squadron of No. 8 Service Flying Training School RAF (September & November 1939)
- Armament Training Detachment of No. 13 Service Flying Training School RAF (October 1939)
- Armament Training Detachment of No. 14 Service Flying Training School RAF (October – November 1939 & January 1940)
- Armament Training Detachment of No. 15 Service Flying Training School RAF (November – December 1939)
- No. 64 Squadron RAF
- No. 106 Squadron RAF
- No. 614 Squadron RAF

Royal Navy

A number of Royal Navy units were here at some point:

- 771 Naval Air Squadron
- 774 Naval Air Squadron
- 800 Naval Air Squadron
- 801 Naval Air Squadron
- 803 Naval Air Squadron
- 810 Naval Air Squadron
- 811 Naval Air Squadron
- 816 Naval Air Squadron
- 818 Naval Air Squadron
- 820 Naval Air Squadron
- 821 Naval Air Squadron
- 822 Naval Air Squadron
- 823 Naval Air Squadron
- 825 Naval Air Squadron

== Current use ==
Today the site is a large industrial estate with many of the hangars and buildings still in use today, parts of the X-shaped runways can still be seen.

The site is split by the A9 trunk road and an oil pipeline company TechnipFMC has built a large Spoolbase and pier incorporating part of the runways as pipe storage racks.

Some of the personnel housing is still in use since being sold by the MoD.
