= Spoolbase =

A spoolbase is a shore-based facility used to facilitate continuous pipe laying for offshore oil and gas production. The facility allows the welding of single or double joints (40' or 80') of steel pipe of 4" to 18" diameter, into predetermined lengths for spooling onto a reel lay vessel.

Shore based spoolbases serve the oil and gas sector from locations in the USA, UK, Norway, Brazil, and Angola, and portable spoolbases may be set up in any location to suit local requirements.
