= MOD West Freugh =

Military airfield in Scotland

- Near Stranraer, Dumfries and Galloway in Scotland
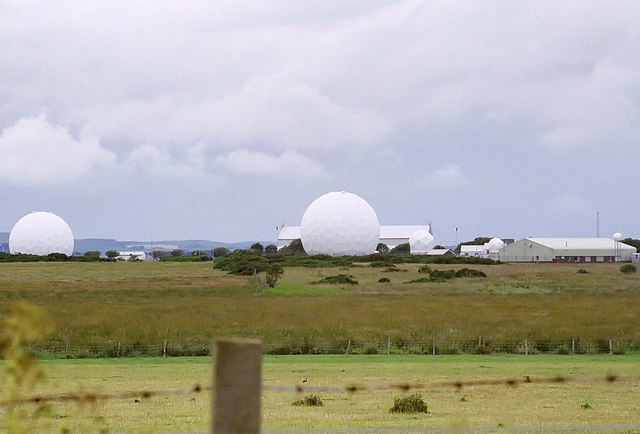
- Hangars and (now demolished) radomes at West Freugh

Site information
- Type: Research establishment and weapons range
- Owner: Ministry of Defence
- Operator: Royal Air Force (1937–2001); QinetiQ (2001–present)
- Website: LPTA West Freugh

Location
- Shown within Dumfries and Galloway MOD West Freugh (the United Kingdom)
- Coordinates: 54°50′50″N 4°56′54″W

Site history
- Built: 1937
- In use: 1937 – present

Airfield information
- Identifiers: ICAO: EGOY, WMO: 03132
Runways
Direction	Length and surface
06/24	1,841 metres (6,040 ft) – Inactive
12/30	914 metres (2,999 ft) – Inactive

MOD West Freugh is located in Wigtownshire, 5 miles (8 km) south east of Stranraer, Dumfries and Galloway, Scotland, and is operated by defence contractor QinetiQ, on behalf of the Ministry of Defence.

It has always been an armaments training school, either for handling or deployment of ordnance.

The site was previously a Royal Air Force station as RAF West Freugh, as well as a Royal Aircraft Establishment as RAE West Freugh.

== History ==
During the First World War the site was a base for naval airships, known as RNAS Luce Bay. The base was provided with one huge airship hangar.

RAF West Freugh opened in 1937 as an armament training camp. During the Second World War, it expanded to include training facilities for observers, navigators, and bomb aimers; and served as a base for the Bombing Trials Unit. The known history of units known at West Freugh is:

- 22 October 1939 – 10 Service Flying Training School formed. Moved November
- 4 November 1939 – 4 Air Observers School formed
- 11 January 1940 – re-designated 4 Bombing & Gunnery School
- 14 June 1941 – 4 Air Observers School reformed
- 11 June 1943 – re-designated 4 Observer Advanced Flying Unit
- 21 June 1945 – 4 Observer Advanced Flying Unit disbanded
- April 1957 – RAF West Freugh incident
- 2001 – Airfield closed, all RAF operations cease
- 2001 – operations taken over by QinetiQ

In addition to the units listed above (and with manpower possibly drawn from some of them) a Mountain Rescue Team was based at West Freugh from 1945 to 1956. After 1956 the MRT at RAF Leuchars assumed responsibility for the area covered by West Freugh. The team was part of the RAF's Mountain Rescue Service.

The following units were also here at some point:

Squadrons

- No. 63 Squadron RAF
- No. 130 Squadron RAF
- No. 255 Squadron RAF
- No. 258 Squadron RAF
- No. 289 Squadron RAF
- No. 290 Squadron RAF
- 801 Naval Air Squadron
- 806 Naval Air Squadron
- 819 Naval Air Squadron
- 820 Naval Air Squadron
- 881 Naval Air Squadron

Units

- 'E' Flight of No. 1 Anti-Aircraft Co-operation Unit RAF (May – September 1938 & May 1939 – October 1942)
- No. 4 Armament Training Camp RAF (January 1937 – April 1938) became No. 4 Armament Training Station RAF (April 1938 – April 1939)
- Detachment of No. 7 Service Flying Training School RAF (November – December 1939)
- Detachment of No. 8 Service Flying Training School RAF (April – May 1940)
- Sub site of No. 249 Maintenance Unit RAF (October 1951 – ?)
- No. 523 (Special Duty) Flight RAF (June 1918 – March 1919)
- No. 524 (Special Duty) Flight RAF (June 1918 – March 1919)
- No. 529 (Special Duty) Flight RAF (August 1918 – March 1919)
- No. 1353 Anti-Aircraft Co-operation Flight RAF (June 1945 – February 1946)
- No. 2784 Squadron RAF Regiment
- Bombing Trials Unit RAF (August 1942 – June 1947 & May 1948 – January 1957) became Air Armament Trials Establishment RAF (January 1957 – August 1957) became RAF Unit (Ministry of Supply), West Freugh (August 1957 – June 1959)

== Satellite Earth Station ==
A satellite earth station is located at West Freugh and was established to receive and distribute data from the European Space Agency's ERS radar satellites. In September 2005 it was announced that the earth station at West Freugh was the first outside Canada to be certified to provide imagery from the Canadian RADARSAT commercial satellite.

== Present day ==
In 1987, Exercise Purple Warrior forces utilised West Freugh.

West Freugh, operated by QinetiQ since 2001, is used as a test range for bombs and Air-to-Ground missiles. Its ranges extend over Luce Bay, and an area of land at Torrs Warren.

In 1988 and 1990 its ranges were used to test Phalanx CIWS weapons system with depleted uranium rounds. A subsequent radiological survey of beach, sand and seawater by staff from the Atomic Weapons Establishment concluded that there was no detectable contamination.

The airfield is no longer licensed or active, however it is available for military exercises. West Freugh has also been used on several occasions for exercises by 16 Air Assault Brigade under the Exercise Joint Warrior banner.

== See also ==
- List of former Royal Air Force stations
