= No. 682 Squadron RAF =

- Active: 1 February 1943 – 14 September 1945
- Country: United Kingdom
- Branch: Royal Air Force
- Role: photo reconnaissance
- Part of: Mediterranean Air Command

Insignia
- Squadron Badge heraldry: No badge known to have been authorised
- Squadron Codes: No code(s) are known to have been carried by this squadron

Aircraft flown
- Reconnaissance: Supermarine Spitfire de Havilland Mosquito

No. 682 Squadron RAF was a photo reconnaissance squadron of the Royal Air Force during the Second World War.

== History ==
The squadron was formed on 1 February 1943 at Maison Blanche, Algeria from No. 4 Photographic Reconnaissance Unit (PRU) RAF. It was at first equipped with Spitfire PR.IVs and -shortly- Mosquito PR.IVs and PR.VIs, and later flew the Spitfire PR.XI in support of the campaign in Tunisia, Sicily, and then Italy. The squadron supported the invasion of Italy and carried out sorties over Yugoslavia including special reconnaissance for army and commando operations. In 1944 the squadron began to target southern France and it moved detachments to France in September 1944, receiving the superlative photographic reconnaissance version of the Spitfire, the PR.XIX. It returned to cover the Italian campaign and also operated over Greece. With the war over the squadron carried survey flights until it was disbanded on 14 September 1945 at Peretola, Italy.

== Aircraft operated ==
Aircraft operated by no. 682 Squadron RAF, data from
| From | To | Aircraft | Variant |
|---|---|---|---|
| February 1943 | May 1943 | Supermarine Spitfire | PR.IV |
| April 1943 | July 1943 | de Havilland Mosquito | PRs.IV & VI |
| April 1943 | September 1945 | Supermarine Spitfire | PR.XI |
| September 1944 | September 1945 | Supermarine Spitfire | PR.XIX |

== Squadron bases ==
Bases and airfields used by no. 682 Squadron RAF, data from
| From | To | Base | Remark |
|---|---|---|---|
| 1 February 1943 | 6 June 1943 | RAF Maison Blanche, Algeria | |
| 6 June 1943 | 8 December 1943 | La Marsa, Tunisia | Detachment at Foggia, Italy |
| 8 December 1943 | September 1944 | San Severo, Italy | Detachments at Pomigliano, Italy; Alghero, Italy; Nettuno, Italy; Voltone, Italy; Follonica, Italy; Borgo, Italy; Le Luc, France; Y.23/Valence, France; Lyons/Bron, France; Malignano, Italy |
| September 1944 | 14 September 1945 | Peretola, Italy | Detachments at Dijon, France; Y.42/Nancy, France and RAF Hal Far, Malta |

== Commanding officers ==
Officers commanding no. 682 squadron RAF, data from
| From | To | Name |
|---|---|---|
| February 1943 | July 1943 | S/Ldr. A.H.W. Ball, DSO, DFC |
| July 1943 | July 1944 | S/Ldr. J.T. Morgan, DSO |
| July 1944 | March 1945 | S/Ldr. R.C. Buchanan, DFC |
| March 1945 | August 1945 | S/Ldr. H.B. Oldfield |
| August 1945 | September 1945 | S/Ldr. B.R. Kenwright, DFC |

== See also ==
- List of Royal Air Force aircraft squadrons
