= Transport Helicopter Regiment 30 =

Regiment in the German Army

Transporthubschrauberregiment 30 (Transport Helicopter Regiment 30)
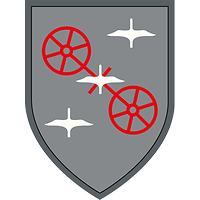
- Active: 1971- today
- Country: Federal Republic of Germany
- Branch: German Army
- Type: German Army Aviation
- Part of: Rapid Forces Division; Helicopter Command
- Garrison/HQ: Niederstetten Air Base
- Nickname: Tauberfranken
- Mottos: Jetzt und hier: Die 30er sind wir! Now and here: We are the 30th!
- Battle honours: Fahnenband Einsatz Kosovo; Fahnenband Einsatz Afghanistan; Fahnenband Einsatz Mali

Commanders
- Current commander: Colonel Roger Kahle-Specht

Aircraft flown
- Cargo helicopter: TTH NH90
- Trainer helicopter: EC135

The German Army Aviation Regiment 30 (German: Transporthubschrauberregiment 30) is a transport helicopter regiment of the German Army (Deutsches Heer). It is based in Niederstetten, Baden-Württemberg, and forms a crucial part of the German Army's air mobility capabilities.

== History ==
The regiment was established in 1971 and has since undergone several restructurings and relocations. Initially formed to enhance the army's airlift and support operations, it has been stationed at Niederstetten Air Base since 1980.

== Mission ==
The primary mission of the German Army Aviation Regiment 30 is to provide air mobility to the German Armed Forces (Bundeswehr). This includes the transportation of troops, equipment, and supplies, as well as medical evacuation (MEDEVAC) and disaster relief operations. The regiment's helicopters are also utilized in international missions, supporting NATO and United Nations operations. The regiment also has the sole SAR LAND capability within the German military and is put on 24/7 readiness for search and rescue missions

== Structure ==
The regiment is composed of seven squadrons, each specializing in different aspects of helicopter operations:

- The staff supports the regimental commander in leading the regiment.
1. st (supply and flight operations) squadron: It supports the staff in the management and supply of the regiment with fuel, ammunition and food and ensures the operation of the airfield.
2. nd (flying) squadron: NH90 operational squadron 1
3. rd (flying) squadron: NH90 operational squadron 2
4. th (technical) squadron: aircraft technical support and aviation fuel squadron
5. th (technical) squadron: control and maintenance of the helicopters
6. th (technical) squadron: repair squadron for aircraft and the necessary ground service equipment
7. th (flying) squadron: Carries out SAR flight operations (land) for the Bundeswehr; since 2020/21 with the H145 LUH SAR.

The regiment primarily operates a fleet of NH90 transport helicopters, which are known for their versatility and advanced technology. These helicopters are equipped to handle a wide range of missions, from troop transport to medical evacuations.

== Operations ==
Throughout its history, German Army Aviation Regiment 30 has been involved in numerous national and international missions. It first deployed to Kosovo in 1998 and left in 2008. In 2013 and 2014 the regiment was deployed to Afghanistan. In 2017 and 2018 it deployed to Mali. It was involved in disaster relief operations in Iraq, Turkey, Greece, Somalia, Slovenia, Austria and Germany.

== Training ==
The initial flight training for the pilots takes place at Bückeburg Air Base at the German Army Aviation Training Center. Tactical training happens when the pilots join their squadrons and takes place in Niederstetten and different specialized training areas.
