= David Shilling =

British fashion designer (born 1949)

- Born: 27 June 1949 (age 76); London, UK
- Education: St Paul's School, London
- Known for: The Hats, David Shilling: A Decade of Design
- Parent(s): Gertrude Shilling (deceased, 1999); Ronald Shilling (deceased, 1988)

David Shilling (born 27 June 1949) is an English milliner, fashion designer, and interdisciplinary artist. Shilling is best known for his flamboyant hat and clothing designs worn on Ladies' Day at Royal Ascot. His clients include royalty, rock stars' wives, heads of state and notably, his mother Gertrude, who famously wore his creations while attending Ascot. Shilling's career encompasses all areas of art, fashion and jewellery design, sculpture, men's and women's bespoke clothing, home furnishings, theatre, ballet, opera and interior design. His art is in the collections of the Metropolitan Museum of Art, the Philadelphia Museum of Art, the Victoria and Albert Museum, the Louvre's Musee des Arts Decoratifs, and the British Government Art Collection.

== Childhood ==
David Shilling was born in London and attended St Paul's School, London. By the age of twelve he was designing hats and outfits for his mother, Gertrude, for her to wear to the Ascot horse races until her death in 1999. By the age of thirteen he was creating toys to sell at his local shop, and later, scarves and accessories to major British retailers such as Fenwick, Fortnum & Mason, and Liberty.

== Career ==
Shilling opened his first store in Marylebone High Street in 1976: two days after its opening the store received an order from a rock star's wife for twenty four hats.

His first collection was purchased in America by Bloomingdale's; and other stores began selling his creations soon afterwards. In the late 1970s Bergdorf Goodman charged up to $3,000 for a David Shilling hat.

BBC British TV series "Arena" created a film on Shilling titled How to Get Ahead in Fashion (1980).

In 1988, he was invited by the USSR to show his hats during the first Miss USSR Pageant in Moscow, the first live TV broadcast throughout the USSR. In 1990, he headed a successful mission for the United Nations in Ecuador which led to other projects as an art and design ambassador with the UN in Africa and Asia.

Shilling eventually stopped wholesale hat-making and moved to producing only made-to-order garments.

He designed the emblem for Britain's Festival of Arts and Culture in 1994; due to this he became a driving force behind the new "Cool Britannia" re-branding of Britain. His designs for theatre, opera, ballet, film and TV formed an exhibition at the Royal Shakespeare Theatre in 1998.

In 2007 he displayed the first of an expected ten collections of hats (each priced at £1,000,000) at Top Marques Monaco. In November 2009 he held his first show in mainland China at the Ritz-Carlton in Beijing. His work encompasses all areas of art, fashion and design, outdoor sculpture, jewellery, men's and ladies' bespoke clothing, accessories, home furnishings, theatre, ballet, opera and interior design.

In 2010, a hat with diamonds created by David in the late 1970s was nominated by the Guinness World Records as the most expensive hat in the world in the 21st century. He previewed a collection of hats designed for men at the Embassy of Monaco, London in 2012. In 2021, he applied to join a ten-day mission to the International Space Station (ISS) in a mixed crew of professional and privately funded astronauts.

== Charitable work ==
Shilling has worked with many charities, including Consortium for Street Children for whom he designed their logo & helped organise their launch at 10 Downing Street, World Horse Welfare and the Darwin Centre, Natural History Museum, London. He is a patron of Action on Addiction and created a millinery course for HM Prison, The Mount.

== Personal life ==
He currently lives in Monaco.

== Notable events ==
- 2005: a series of 40-foot-tall (12 m) stainless steel and aluminium sculptures collectively called "Hope" were installed atop Primrose Hill in London's Regent's Park as part of "Discover - Positive Elements of Life".
- 2018: he launched World Yacht Party, a collection of music videos and recordings.

== In collections ==
- Metropolitan Museum of Art (New York)
- Philadelphia Museum of Art
- Los Angeles County Museum
- The Louvre's Musée des Arts Décoratifs
- Victoria and Albert Museum (London)
- British Government Art Collection Acrylic on Canvas (London)
- Holdenby House Steel Sculptures (Northampton, England)
