= List of de Havilland Mosquito operators =

The following are operators of the de Havilland Mosquito.

== Military operators ==
=== Australia ===
Royal Australian Air Force

- No. 1 Squadron RAAF
- No. 87 Squadron RAAF
- No. 94 Squadron RAAF
- No. 456 Squadron RAAF
- No. 464 Squadron RAAF
- No. 1 Photo Reconnaissance Unit RAAF
- No. 5 Operational Training Unit RAAF

=== Belgium ===
Belgian Air Force

- 11 Squadron, 1 Wing

=== Canada ===
Royal Canadian Air Force

- No. 400 Squadron RCAF
- No. 404 Squadron RCAF
- No. 406 Squadron RCAF
- No. 409 Squadron RCAF
- No. 410 Squadron RCAF
- No. 418 Squadron RCAF

=== China ===
Republic of China Air Force

- 1st BG RoCAF flew 200 Canadian built Mosquitos 1948–1949

=== People's Republic of China ===
People's Liberation Army Air Force

- Five ex-Nationalist Mosquitos operated by PLAAF in all version.
- Took part in the flight demonstration of the foundation celebration of People's Republic of China on October 1, 1949.

=== Czechoslovakia ===
Czechoslovak Air Force

=== Dominican Republic ===
Dominican Air Force

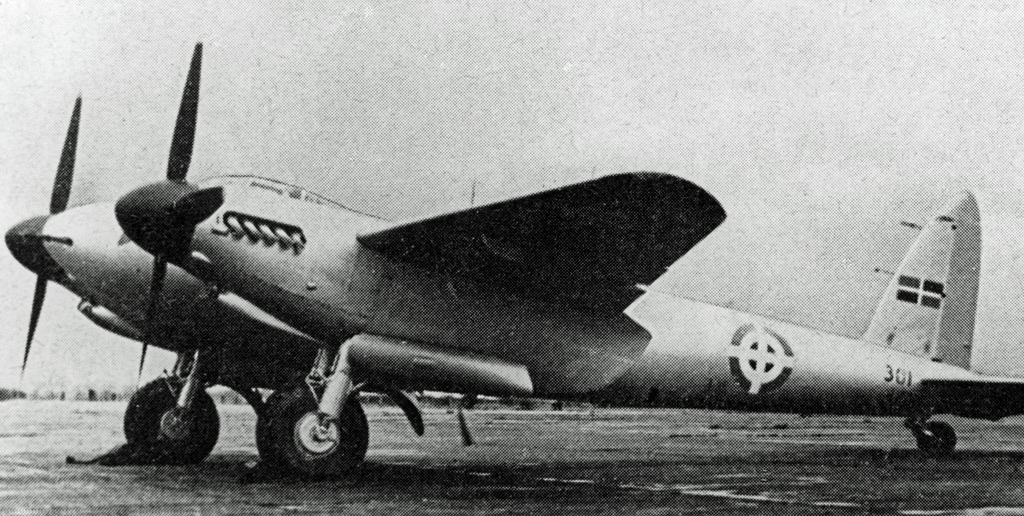
Dominican AF de Havilland Mosquito FB.6

=== France ===
French Air Force

=== Haiti ===
Haitian Air Force

=== Israel ===
Israeli Air Force

=== New Zealand ===
Royal New Zealand Air Force

- 14 Squadron (replacing Vought Corsairs 1948–1952)
- 75 Squadron (replacing Avro Lincolns 1945–1951)
- 487 Squadron (replacing Lockheed Venturas 1943–1945)
- 488 Squadron (replacing Bristol Beaufighters 1943–1945)
- 489 Squadron (replacing Bristol Beaufighters 1945)

=== Norway ===
Royal Norwegian Navy Air Service
Royal Norwegian Air Force

- 333 Squadron
- 334 Squadron

=== Poland ===
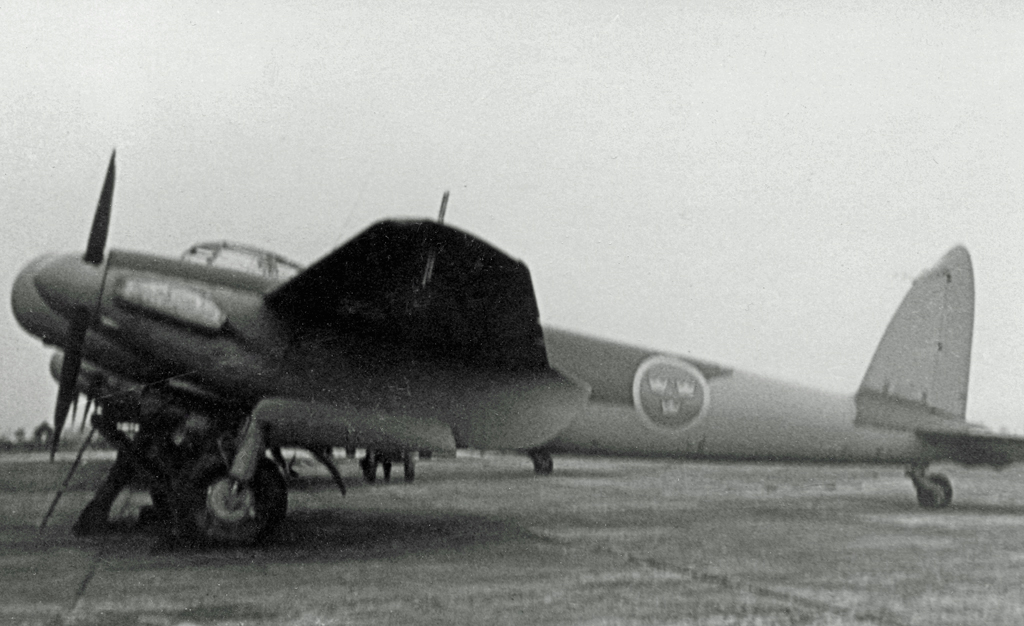
de Havilland Mosquito NF.XIX of the Royal Swedish Air Force in October 1949.

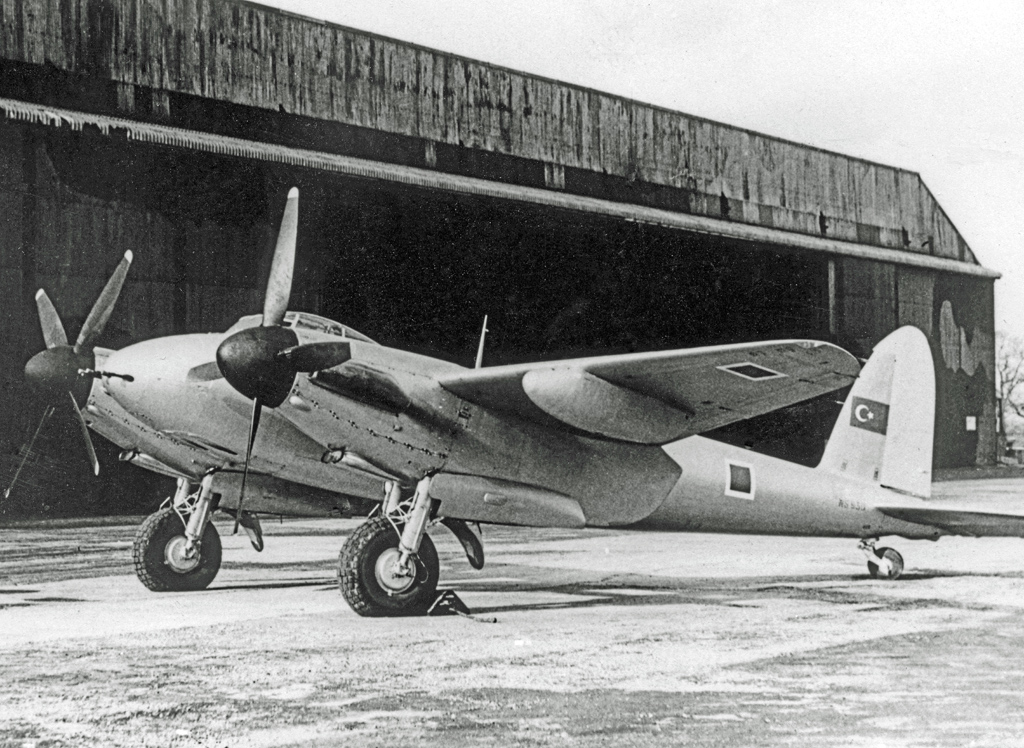
de Havilland DH.98 Mosquito FB.VI NS930 of the Turkish Air Force at Manchester (Ringway) Airport in 1947

Polish Air Forces on exile in Great Britain

- No. 305 Polish Bomber Squadron, "Ziemi Wielkopolskiej im. Marszałka Józefa Piłsudskiego"
- No. 307 Polish Night Fighter Squadron, "Lwowskich Puchaczy"

=== South Africa ===
South African Air Force

- No 60 Squadron (PR) SAAF, (North Africa, San Severo (Italy), Bloemfontein (South Africa): February 1943 – June 1947)

=== Soviet Union ===
Soviet Air Forces

=== Sweden ===
Royal Swedish Air Force

- Västmanland Wing (F 1)

=== Switzerland ===
Swiss Air Force

=== Turkey ===
Turkish Air Force

=== United Kingdom ===
Royal Air Force

Squadrons:

- No. 4 Squadron RAF (1943-44 & 1945-50)
- No. 8 Squadron RAF (1946-47)
- No. 11 Squadron RAF (1948-50)
- No. 13 Squadron RAF (1946-52)
- No. 14 Squadron RAF (1945-51)
- No. 18 Squadron RAF (1947)
- No. 21 Squadron RAF (1943-47)
- No. 22 Squadron RAF (1946)
- No. 23 Squadron RAF (1942-52)
- No. 25 Squadron RAF (1942-51)
- No. 27 Squadron RAF (1943-44)
- No. 29 Squadron RAF (1943-51)
- No. 36 Squadron RAF (1946-47)
- No. 39 Squadron RAF (1946 & 1949-53)
- No. 45 Squadron RAF (1947)
- No. 46 Squadron RAF (1944)
- No. 47 Squadron RAF (1944 & 1945-46)
- No. 55 Squadron RAF (1946)
- No. 58 Squadron RAF (1946-47 & 1949-54)
- No. 68 Squadron RAF (1944-45)
- No. 69 Squadron RAF (1945-47)
- No. 81 Squadron RAF (1946-55)
- No. 82 (United Provinces) Squadron RAF (1944-46)
- No. 84 Squadron RAF (1945-46)
- No. 85 Squadron RAF (1942-51)
- No. 89 Squadron RAF (1945-46)
- No. 96 Squadron RAF (1943-44)
- No. 98 Squadron RAF (1945-51)
- No. 105 Squadron RAF (1941-46)
- No. 107 Squadron RAF (1944-48)
- No. 108 Squadron RAF (1944)
- No. 109 Squadron RAF (1942-52)
- No. 110 (Hyderabad) Squadron RAF (1944-46)
- No. 114 (Hong Kong) Squadron RAF (1945-46)
- No. 125 (Newfoundland) Squadron RAF (1944-45)
- No. 128 Squadron RAF (1944-46)
- No. 139 (Jamaica) Squadron RAF (1942-53)
- No. 140 Squadron RAF (1943-45)
- No. 141 Squadron RAF (1943-51)
- No. 142 Squadron RAF (1944-45)
- No. 143 Squadron RAF (1944-45)
- No. 151 Squadron RAF (1942-46)
- No. 157 Squadron RAF (1942-45)
- No. 162 Squadron RAF (1943-46)
- No. 163 Squadron RAF (1945)
- No. 169 Squadron RAF (1944-45)
- No. 176 Squadron RAF (1945-46)
- No. 180 Squadron RAF (1945-46)
- No. 192 Squadron RAF (1945 & 1951-52)
- No. 199 Squadron RAF (1952-53)
- No. 211 Squadron RAF (1945-46)
- No. 219 (Mysore) Squadron RAF (1944-46 & 1951-54)
- No. 235 Squadron RAF (1944-45)
- No. 239 Squadron RAF (1944-45)
- No. 248 Squadron RAF (1943-46)
- No. 249 (Gold Coast) Squadron RAF (1946)
- No. 254 Squadron RAF (1945)
- No. 255 Squadron RAF (1945-46)
- No. 256 Squadron RAF (1943-46)
- No. 264 (Madras Presidency) Squadron RAF (1942-52)
- No. 268 Squadron RAF (1945-46)
- No. 333 Squadron RAF (1943-45)
- No. 334 Squadron RAF (1945)
- No. 500 Squadron RAuxAF (1947-48)
- No. 502 Squadron RAuxAF (1947-48)
- No. 504 Squadron RAuxAF (1947-48)
- No. 515 Squadron RAF (1944-45)
- No. 521 Squadron RAF (1942-43)
- No. 527 Squadron RAF (1952-54)
- No. 540 Squadron RAF (1942-53)
- No. 544 Squadron RAF (1943-45)
- No. 571 Squadron RAF (1944-45)
- No. 600 Squadron RAF (1944-45)
- No. 604 Squadron RAF (1944-45)
- No. 605 Squadron RAF (1943-45 & 1947-48)
- No. 608 Squadron RAuxAF (1944-45 & 1947-48)
- No. 609 Squadron RAuxAF (1947-48)
- No. 613 Squadron RAuxAF (1943-45)
- No. 616 Squadron RAuxAF (1947-49)
- No. 617 Squadron RAF (1944-45)
- No. 618 Squadron RAF (1943-45)
- No. 627 Squadron RAF (1943-45)
- No. 680 Squadron RAF (1944-46)
- No. 681 Squadron RAF (1943)
- No. 683 Squadron RAF (1943)
- No. 684 Squadron RAF (1943-46)
- No. 692 (Fellowship of the Bellows) Squadron RAF (1944-45)
- Handling Squadron

Communication Units:

- No. 2 Group Communication Flight RAF
- No. 2 Group Communication Squadron RAF
- 2nd Tactical Air Force Communication Squadron RAF
- No. 84 Group Communication Squadron RAF
- No. 85 Group Communication Squadron RAF
- No. 138 Wing Communication Unit RAF
- No. 216 Group Communication Flight RAF
- Allied Expeditionary Air Forces Communication Squadron RAF
- British Air Forces of Occupation Communications Squadron RAF
- Fighter Command Communication Squadron RAF
- Supreme Headquarters Allied Expeditionary Forces (RAF) Communication Squadron RAF

Support aircraft for Operational Conversion Units:

- 226, 228, 229, 230, 231, 233, 236, 237 & 238 OCUs

Conversion Units:

- 1330, 1550, 1653, 1655, 1660, 1668, 1672, 1692 Conversion Units & Mosquito Conversion Unit RAF

Flights:

- Highball Trials Flight RAF
- Meteorological Research Flight RAF
- Mosquito Conversion Flight RAF
- 1300, 1317, 1401, 1404, 1409, 1422, 1473, 1474, 1689 & 1692 Flights

Ferry Units:

- Ferry Training Unit RAF
- No. 1 Ferry Unit RAF
- Overseas Ferry Unit RAF
- No. 5 Ferry Unit RAF
- No. 8 Ferry Unit RAF
- No. 9 Ferry Unit RAF
- No. 10 Ferry Unit RAF
- No. 16 Ferry Unit RAF
- No. 301 Ferry Training Unit RAF
- No. 304 Ferry Training Unit RAF
- No. 305 Ferry Training Unit RAF
- No. 309 Ferry Training & Aircraft Despatch Unit RAF
- No. 313 Ferry Training Unit RAF

Units:

- No. 1 Civilian Anti-Aircraft Co-operation Unit RAF
- No. 2 Civilian Anti-Aircraft Co-operation Unit RAF
- No. 3 Civilian Anti-Aircraft Co-operation Unit RAF
- No. 3/4 Civilian Anti-Aircraft Co-operation Unit RAF
- No. 4 Civilian Anti-Aircraft Co-operation Unit RAF
- No. 5 Civilian Anti-Aircraft Co-operation Unit RAF
- No. 1 Middle East Check & Conversion Unit RAF
- No. 1 Photographic Reconnaissance Unit RAF
- No. 2 Armament Practice Station RAF
- No. 5 Group Film Unit RAF
- No. 9 Refresher Flying Unit RAF
- No. 25 Armament Practice Camp RAF
- No. 151 Repair Unit RAF
- No. 204 Advanced Flying School RAF
- No. 1655 Mosquito Training Unit RAF
- Aeroplane and Armament Experimental Establishment
- Airborne Forces Experimental Establishment
- Air Despatch Letter Service Squadron RAF
- Air Photography Development Unit RAF
- Air-Sea Warfare Development Unit RAF
- Armament Practice Station, Acklington RAF
- Armament Practice Station, Lubeck RAF
- Armament Practice Station, Sylt RAF
- Bomb Ballistics Unit RAF
- Bomber Command Instructors School RAF
- Bombing Development Unit RAF
- Bomber Support Development Unit RAF
- Central Bomber Establishment
- Central Fighter Establishment
- Coastal Command Development Unit RAF
- Central Gunnery School RAF
- Controller of Research & Development, Ansty RAF
- Controller of Supplies (Air) RAF
- Central Signals Establishment
- Empire Air Armament School RAF
- Empire Air Navigation School RAF
- Empire Flying School RAF
- Empire Central Flying School RAF
  - Handling Squadron
- Empire Test Pilots School
- Far East Air Force Training Squadron RAF
- Fighter Interception Development Squadron RAF
- Fighter Interception Unit RAF
- Ground Attack Training Unit RAF
- Home Command Examining Unit RAF
- RAF Institute of Aviation Medicine
- Marine Aircraft Experimental Establishment
- Night Fighter Development Wing RAF
- Pathfinder Navigation Training Unit RAF
- Photographic Reconnaissance Development Unit RAF
- Radio Warfare Establishment RAF
- Royal Aircraft Establishment
- Signals Development Unit RAF
- Signals Flying Unit RAF
- Temperature and Humidity Flight RAF
- Telecommunications Flying Unit RAF

Maintenance Units:

- 13 & 274 Maintenance Units

Operational Training Units:

- 6, 8, 13, 16, 51, 54, 60, 111 & 132 OTUs

Station Flights:

- Aldergrove
- Ballykelly
- Bassingbourn
- Benson
- Buckeburg
- Castle Kennedy
- Celle
- Church Fenton
- Colerne
- Coltishall
- Coningsby
- Defford
- Eastleigh
- Gatwick
- Hemswell
- Henlow
- Heston
- Horsham St Faith
- Hunsdon
- Kinloss
- Leuchars
- Linton-on-Ouse
- Luneburg
- Manby
- Manston
- North Creake
- Northolt
- Oulton
- Pershore
- Polebrook
- Schleswigland
- Swinderby
- Sylt
- Tangmere
- Upwood
- Wahn
- West Freugh
- West Malling
- Wickenby
- Wittering
- Woodbridge

Royal Navy Fleet Air Arm

- 703 Naval Air Squadron VI, TR.33, TT.39, TR.37
- 704 Naval Air Squadron VI, T.3, B.25
- 728 Naval Air Squadron T.3, TT.39, B.25
- 733 Naval Air Squadron B.25
- 739 Naval Air Squadron TR.33
- 751 Naval Air Squadron VI, TR.33
- 762 Naval Air Squadron VI, T.3, TR.33, B.25
- 770 Naval Air Squadron B.25
- 771 Naval Air Squadron TR.33, TT.39, TR.37, B.25
- 772 Naval Air Squadron B.25
- 773 Naval Air Squadron VI
- 777 Naval Air Squadron B.25
- 778 Naval Air Squadron VI, TR.33, B.25
- 780 Naval Air Squadron VI, T.3
- 787 Naval Air Squadron VI
- 790 Naval Air Squadron VI, TR.33, B.25
- 797 Naval Air Squadron B.25
- 811 Naval Air Squadron VI, T.3

=== United States ===
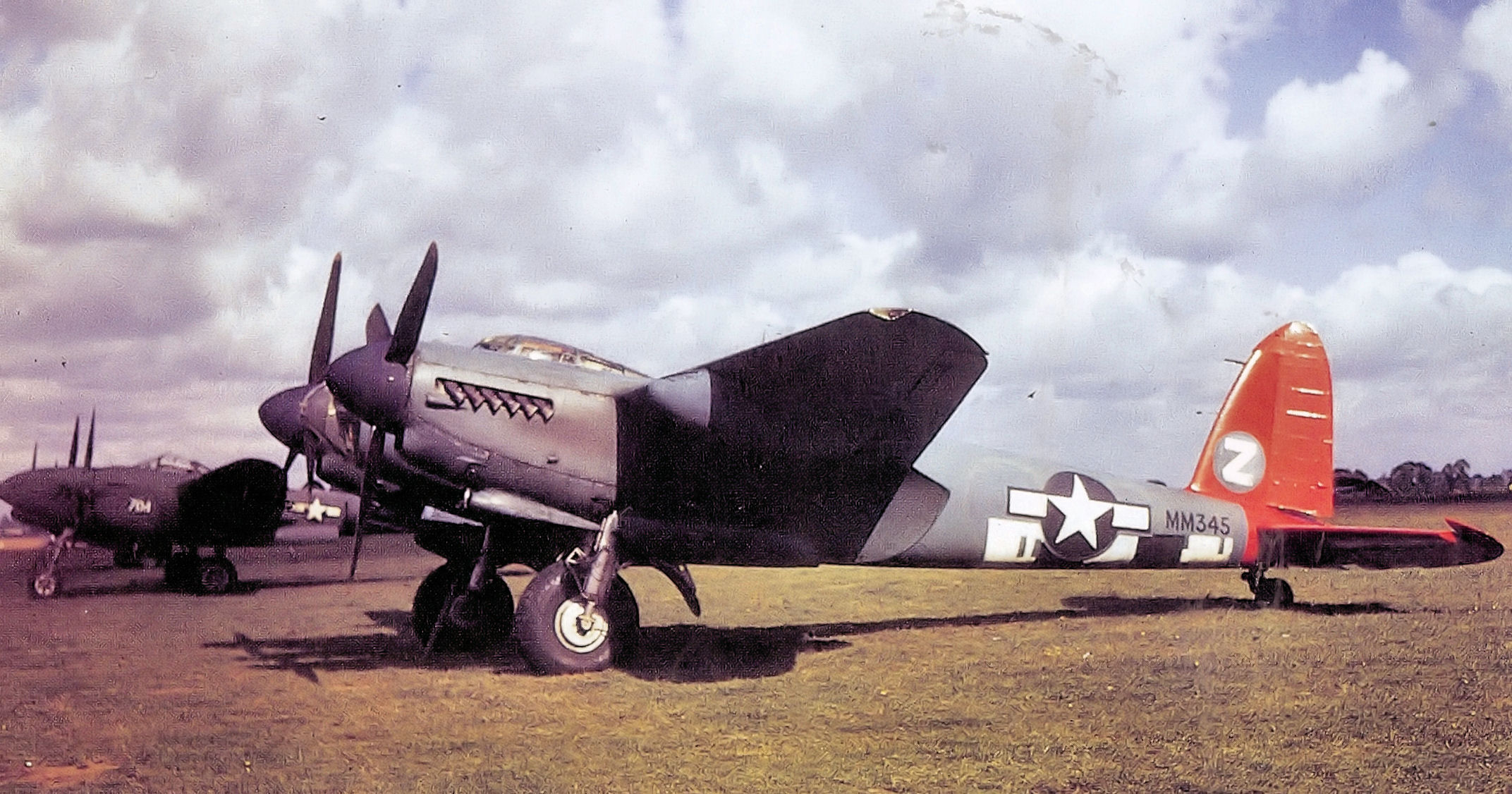
de Havilland of the 654th Bomb Squadron, 25th Bombardment Group, at RAF Watton England.

United States Army Air Forces

  - 416th Night Fighter Squadron
  - 425th Night Fighter Squadron
- 25th Bombardment Group
  - 653rd Bomb Squadron
  - 654th Bomb Squadron
- 492nd Bombardment Group
- 802nd Reconnaissance Group
  - 8th Reconnaissance Squadron Special
  - 8th Weather Reconnaissance Squadron

=== Venezuela ===
Venezuelan Air Force

=== Yugoslavia ===
SFR Yugoslav Air Force

- 103rd Reconnaissance Aviation Regiment (1951–1956)
- 88th Bomber Aviation Regiment (1952–1957)
- 16th Reconnaissance Squadron of Anti-Aircraft Artillery (1958–1962)

== Civil operators ==
=== Canada ===
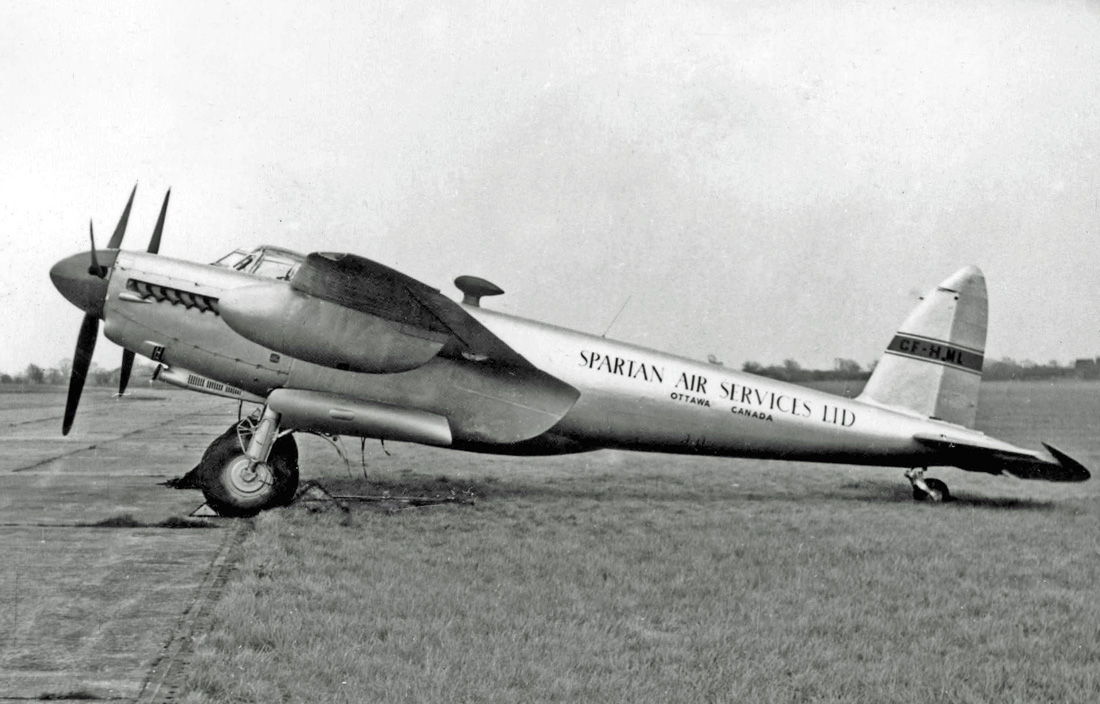
de Havilland DH.98 Mosquito B.35 CF-HML of Spartan Air Services, Ottawa, Ontario.

Spartan Air Services

=== Mexico ===
Coculum Aeronautica SA de CV

=== Switzerland ===
Swissair briefly operated a single interned reconnaissance Mosquito in 1944, but the aircraft was handed back to the Swiss Air Force, who used it as a test bed in 1945.

=== Turkey ===
General Command of Mapping (Turkey)

=== United Kingdom ===
BOAC

- Fleet Requirements Unit, civilian operated unit, run by Airwork Ltd for the Fleet Air Arm

== See also ==
- de Havilland Mosquito
