= Ronald Eric Bishop =

British aerospace engineer

R. E. Bishop
- Born: 27 February 1903; Kensington, London, England
- Died: 11 June 1989 (aged 86); St Albans, Hertfordshire, England
- Spouse: Nora Armstrong
- Children: 2 sons
- Engineering career
- Discipline: Aeronautics
- Employer: de Havilland 1921–1964
- Significant advance: de Havilland Mosquito, de Havilland Comet
- Awards: Gold Medal, RAeS (1964)

Ronald Eric Bishop CBE FRAeS (27 February 1903 – 11 June 1989), commonly referred to as R. E. Bishop, was a British engineer who was the chief designer of the de Havilland Mosquito, one of the most famous aircraft of the Second World War. He also designed the de Havilland Comet jetliner of 1949.

== Early life ==
Bishop was born in Kensington, London, England.

He was the son of Mr A.R.A. Bishop of 34 Warrior Square in St Leonards-on-Sea in Sussex.

== Career ==
He joined de Havilland as an apprentice aged 18 in 1921, and would work there for the next 43 years. He joined the company's design office in 1923.

Bishop became the Chief Designer in 1936, taking over from Arthur Hagg. The first aircraft for which he was responsible was the DH.95 Flamingo, the company's first all-metal monoplane. It had a stressed-skin and carried 17 passengers, first flying on 22 December 1938. Winston Churchill used one to journey to France in the early months of the war before Dunkirk (Operation Dynamo).

Also in his design team were:

- Charles Walker, chief engineer
- Richard Clarkson (responsible for aerodynamics), who would later design the Hawker Siddeley Trident (de Havilland DH121)
- A.P. Wilkins
- William Tamblin (later OBE, who designed the wings of the Mosquito and Comet)

=== Wartime ===
Starting in 1938, the outstanding achievement of his design office was the DH.98 Mosquito. Conceived as an unarmed bomber, it was expected to reach an unprecedented 376 mph, but successfully managed speeds exceeding 400mph (640kmh), beating a high majority of planes at the time, including the Supermarine Spitfire, allowing it to become Britain's fastest aircraft at the time, and became known as the Wooden Wonder. The Air Ministry had not been amenable to the radical and untried idea of an unarmed bomber, let alone one made of a seemingly obsolete material like wood, and did not fund the design. But Air Chief Marshal Sir Wilfrid Freeman was interested and boldly championed the concept; through official scepticism the plane became known as Freeman's Folly. However, his confidence was fully justified as it became the fastest wartime aircraft for two and a half years. The concept of a fast, unarmed bomber was amply justified in practice with very low loss rates. The plane was officially announced on 26 October 1942, de Havilland's first military plane since the Airco DH.10 Amiens of the First World War. On 5 May 1943 its high speed prowess was announced.

=== The jet age ===
After the war, Bishop became the design director on the company's board of directors on 27 December 1946 until February 1964, when he retired. Later that year in October, he received the Gold Medal of the RAeS.

He was first on the scene in the DH110 crash in September 1952, the 1952 Farnborough Airshow crash.

In December 1954, Tim Wilkins became head of design at de Havilland.

He became deputy managing director in November 1958.

On 10 June 1997, he appeared on the 37p stamp in a commemorative set of stamps.

=== Designs ===
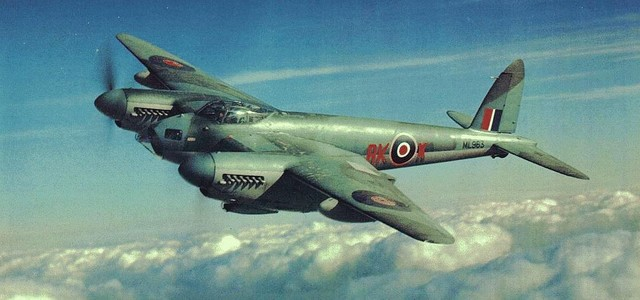
DH98 Mosquito ML963 of 571 Squadron in September 1944

Aircraft he was responsible for were:

- Flamingo
- Mosquito
- Hornet
- Vampire – the first ever fighter aircraft to exceed 500 mph
- Dove – twin-engined propeller airliner in 1945
- Venom – developed from the Vampire
- Heron – four-engined propeller airliner in 1950
- DH.108 – the first British swept wing jet, mainly designed by John Carver Meadows Frost, and the first British aircraft to exceed the speed of sound
- DH106 Sea Vixen
- Comet – the world's first jet airliner in July 1949 and the first trans-atlantic jet service in October 1958, later used for the design of the Nimrod, and seeing service until 1973

== Personal life ==
Bishop married Nora Armstrong (1904-91) in Rochford in 1936. They had two sons (one born in 1947). He received the CBE in the 1946 Birthday Honours. He lived at Fieldgate on Redbourn Lane (B487) in Hatching Green, Harpenden, then South Holme on the B487, and on Oakhurst Avenue, Harpenden.

His son was Richard Armstrong Bishop.

He died in St Albans in June 1989, at the age of 86.

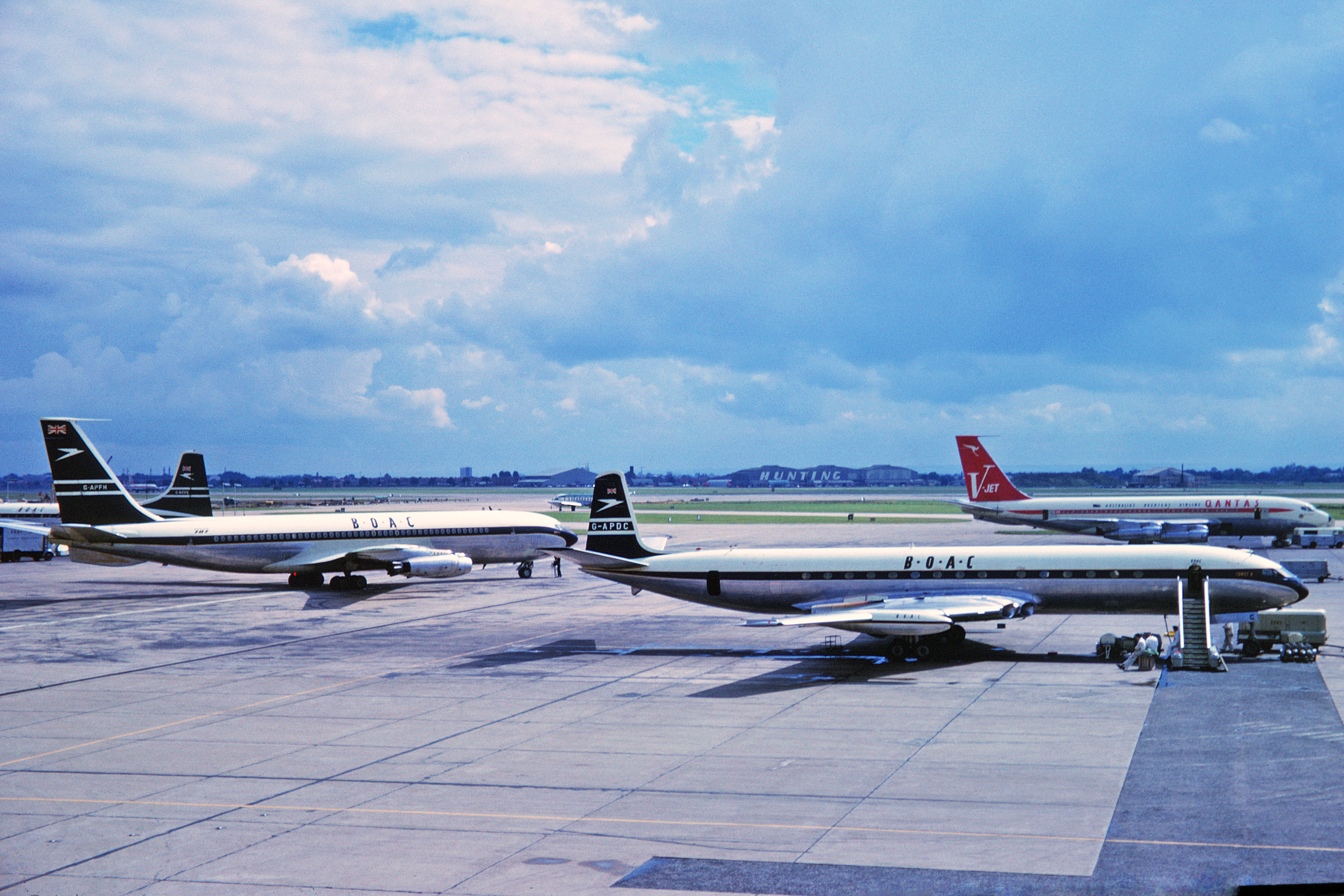
G-APDC DH106 Comet 4 in September 1963

== See also ==
- List of de Havilland Mosquito operators
- List of surviving de Havilland Mosquitos
- Roy Chadwick, designer of the Lancaster
- Frank Halford, designer of DH jet engines
- Teddy Petter, designer of the Canberra

Business positions
Preceded by Arthur Ernest Hagg	Chief Designer of de Havilland Aircraft; 1936-54	Succeeded by Tim Wilkins
