= Chhota Jagulia High School =

Chhota Jagulia High School (H.S.)
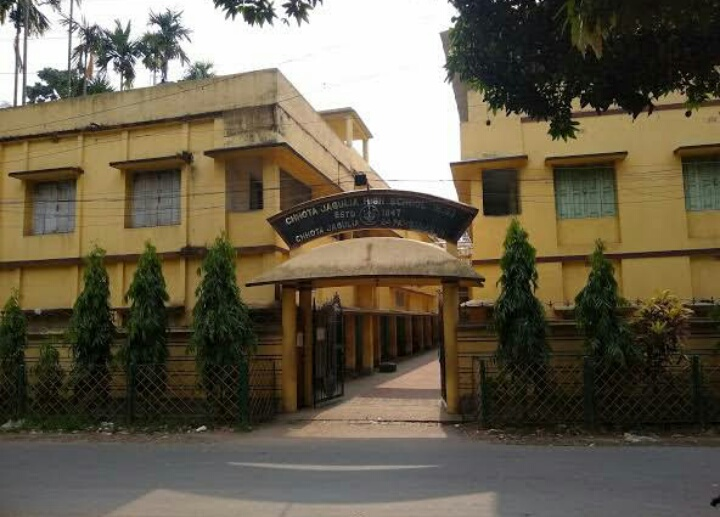

Location
- Chhota Jagulia, North 24 Parganas; West Bengal; India; 22.735107°N 88.535088°E

Information
- Type: Higher Secondary School
- Established: 1847; 179 years ago
- School board: WBBSE, West Bengal Council of Higher Secondary Education, West Bengal Council of Rabindra Open Schooling
- Headmaster: Prabir Ghosh
- Gender: Co-educational
- Website: www.chhotajaguliahs.org

Chhota Jagulia High School, an old Bengali medium co-educational higher secondary school. It offers classes from V to XII.

== History ==
Chhota Jagulia High School was founded in 1847 during the British colonial era. Initially catering to primary education, the institution gradually expanded to offer secondary and higher secondary education. Over the decades, it has played a significant role in enhancing literacy and contributing to the social and economic development of the region.

== Academics ==
The school is affiliated with the West Bengal Board of Secondary Education (WBBSE) for secondary level and the West Bengal Council of Higher Secondary Education (WBCHSE) for higher secondary level education. The Bengali-medium curriculum includes various subjects, with students offered science, arts, and commerce streams in higher secondary classes. It emphasizes a well-rounded education, including life skills and critical thinking.

== Infrastructure ==
The Chhota Jagulia High School campus includes well-maintained classrooms, a library, science laboratories, and a computer lab. Designed to support both academic learning and extracurricular activities, the facilities are continuously upgraded to provide modern amenities for the students.

== Extracurricular Activities ==
The school offers various extracurricular activities, including sports, cultural events, and academic competitions. Annual sports meets and cultural events are organized to foster community spirit and encourage students' participation. Competitions like debates and essay writing help students build communication and leadership skills.

== See also ==
- Education in India
- List of schools in India
- Education in West Bengal
