= RAF Bovingdon =

Former RAF and later civilian airfield

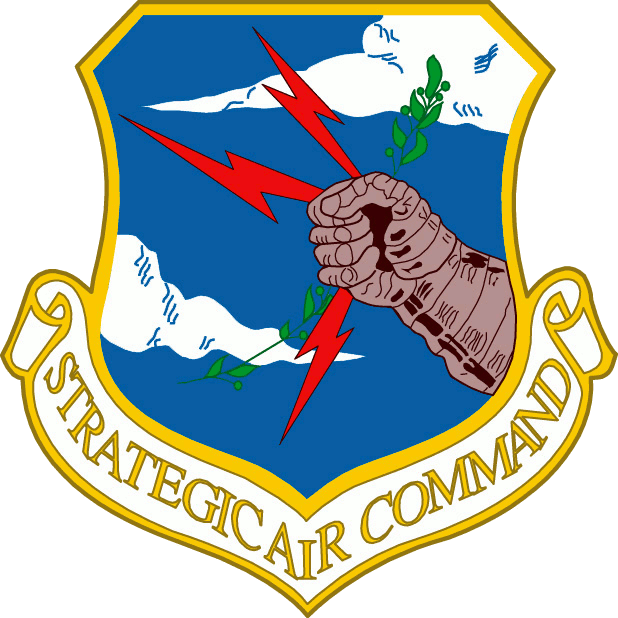
MOD Bovingdon ~~RAF Bovingdon~~ ~~USAAF Station 112~~
- Near Hemel Hempstead, Hertfordshire in England
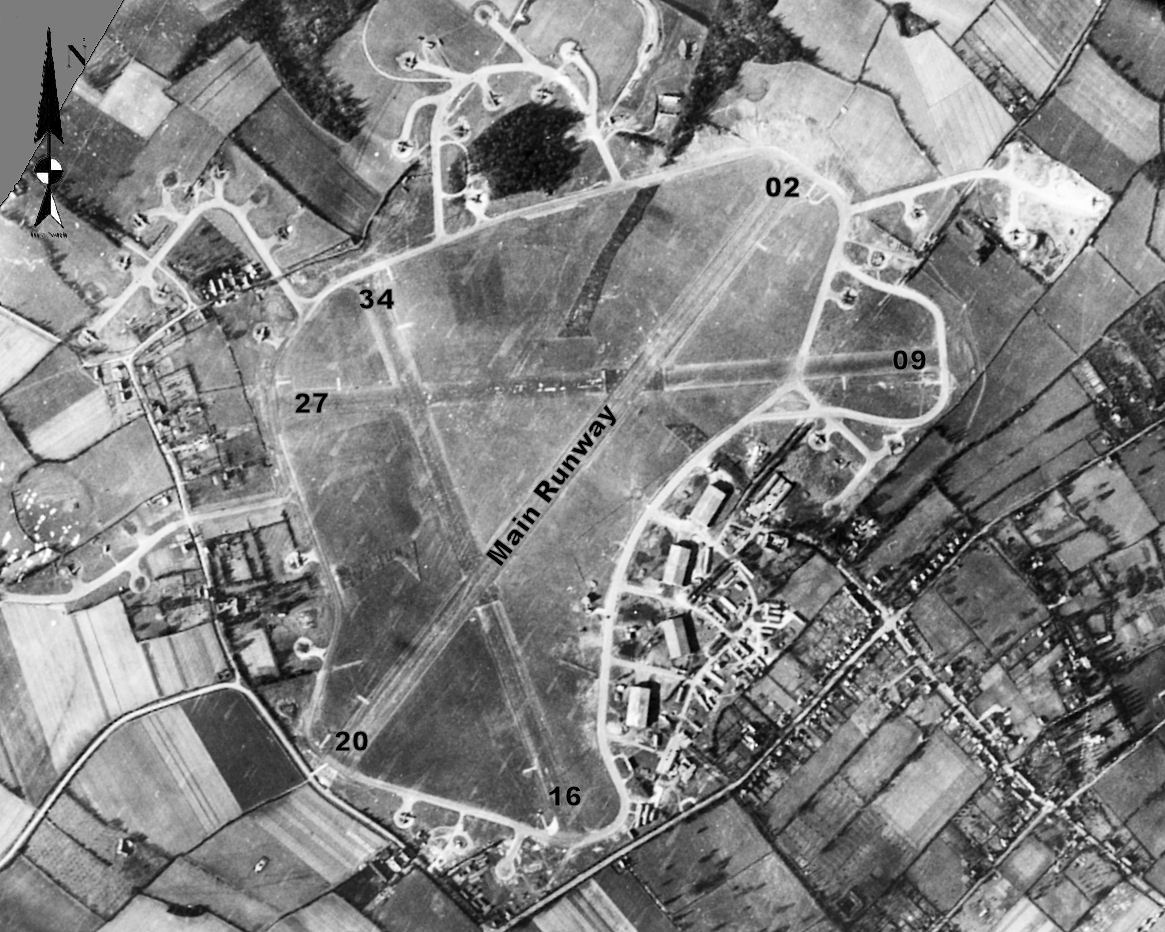
- Aerial photograph of Bovingdon airfield looking north, the technical site with four T2 hangars is at the southeast of the airfield, the bomb dump is to the west, 13 March 1944

Site information
- Code: BV, BZ (1940s); ZZ (1956)
- Owner: Air Ministry
- Operator: Royal Air Force; United States Army Air Forces; United States Air Force
- Controlled by: Eighth Air Force (1942–1946); RAF Flying Training Command (1947–1962); Strategic Air Command (1951–1962); RAF Transport Command (1962–1969)

Location
- Shown within Hertfordshire RAF Bovingdon (the United Kingdom)
- Coordinates: 51°43′37″N 000°32′36″W

Site history
- Built: 1941
- In use: 1942–1972
- Battles/wars: European theatre of World War II; Cold War

Airfield information
- Elevation: 500 ft (152 m) AMSL
Runways
Direction	Length and surface
02/20	1,634 yd (1,494 m) Concrete/tarmac
16/34	1,433 yd (1,310 m) Concrete/tarmac
09/27	1,433 yd (1,310 m) Concrete/tarmac

Royal Air Force Bovingdon or more simply RAF Bovingdon is a former Royal Air Force station located near the village of Bovingdon, Hertfordshire, England, about 2.5 miles (4.0 km) south-west of Hemel Hempstead and 2.5 miles (4.0 km) south-east of Berkhamsted.

During the Second World War, the airfield was used by the Royal Air Force (RAF) and the United States Army Air Forces (USAAF) Eighth Air Force. It was assigned USAAF designation Station 112, station code "BV", later changed to "BZ".

== Royal Air Force use ==
Bovingdon was built in 1941–42 as a standard Class A RAF bomber airfield. The main NE/SW runway was 1,634 yards (1,494 m) long and the two secondary runways were each 1,433 yd (1,310 m) long. Over 30 dispersal hardstandings were built.

On 15 June 1942, No. 7 Group RAF, RAF Bomber Command took up residence at Bovingdon. Operational missions were flown in June and July by the RAF until the airfield was turned over to the USAAF in August.

== United States Army Air Forces use ==
USAAF Station Units assigned to RAF Bovingdon were:

- 1st Combat Crew Replacement Center Group

11th Combat Crew Replacement Center Group

- 328th Service Group (VIII Air Force Service Command)

347th Service Squadron; HHS 328th Service Group

- 18th Weather Squadron
- 26th Station Complement Squadron
- Headquarters & Headquarters Squadron (VIII Fighter Command)

Regular Army Station Units included:

- 1054th Signal Company
- 1071st Quartermaster Company
- 1787th Ordnance Supply & Maintenance Company
- 978th Military Police Company
- 2128th Engineer Fire Fighting Platoon

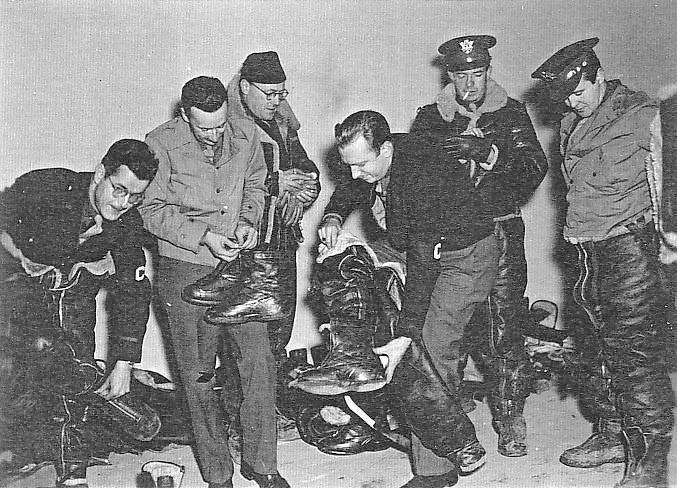
American military journalists undergoing combat flight training for bombing missions in 1943. Left to right: Gladwin Hill, William Wade, Robert Post, Walter Cronkite, Homer Bigart, and Paul Manning.

The primary mission of Bovingdon was to support Eighth Air Force Headquarters and the Air Technical Section, both equipped with a variety of aircraft types. General Eisenhower's personal B-17 was housed on the base. During World War II several film stars were assigned at one time or another to the base, including Clark Gable, James Stewart and William Holden. Among famous wartime visitors were Bob Hope, Frances Langford, Mrs Eleanor Roosevelt, and Glenn Miller.

A unique mission undertaken at Bovingdon was the training of United States journalists to cover the air war over Occupied Europe. A group of military journalists underwent training in February 1943 to fly high-altitude missions in bombers, to shoot the flexible machine guns (although they did not actually fire them in combat), as well as parachute and life support training as aircrew.

The group of journalists flew on a combat mission over Wilhelmshaven, Germany, on 26 February 1943 to attack the German Naval submarine pens there. The mission saw heavy losses for the USAAF; also, the aircraft of Andy Rooney of the Stars and Stripes was damaged by flak and Robert Post of The New York Times was killed in action when his B-24 exploded. This ended the training of journalists to fly along with Eighth Air Force bomber crews. Other journalists who underwent this training included Walter Cronkite, James Denton Scott, Homer Bigart, William Wade and Gladwin Hill.

=== 92nd Bombardment Group (Heavy) ===
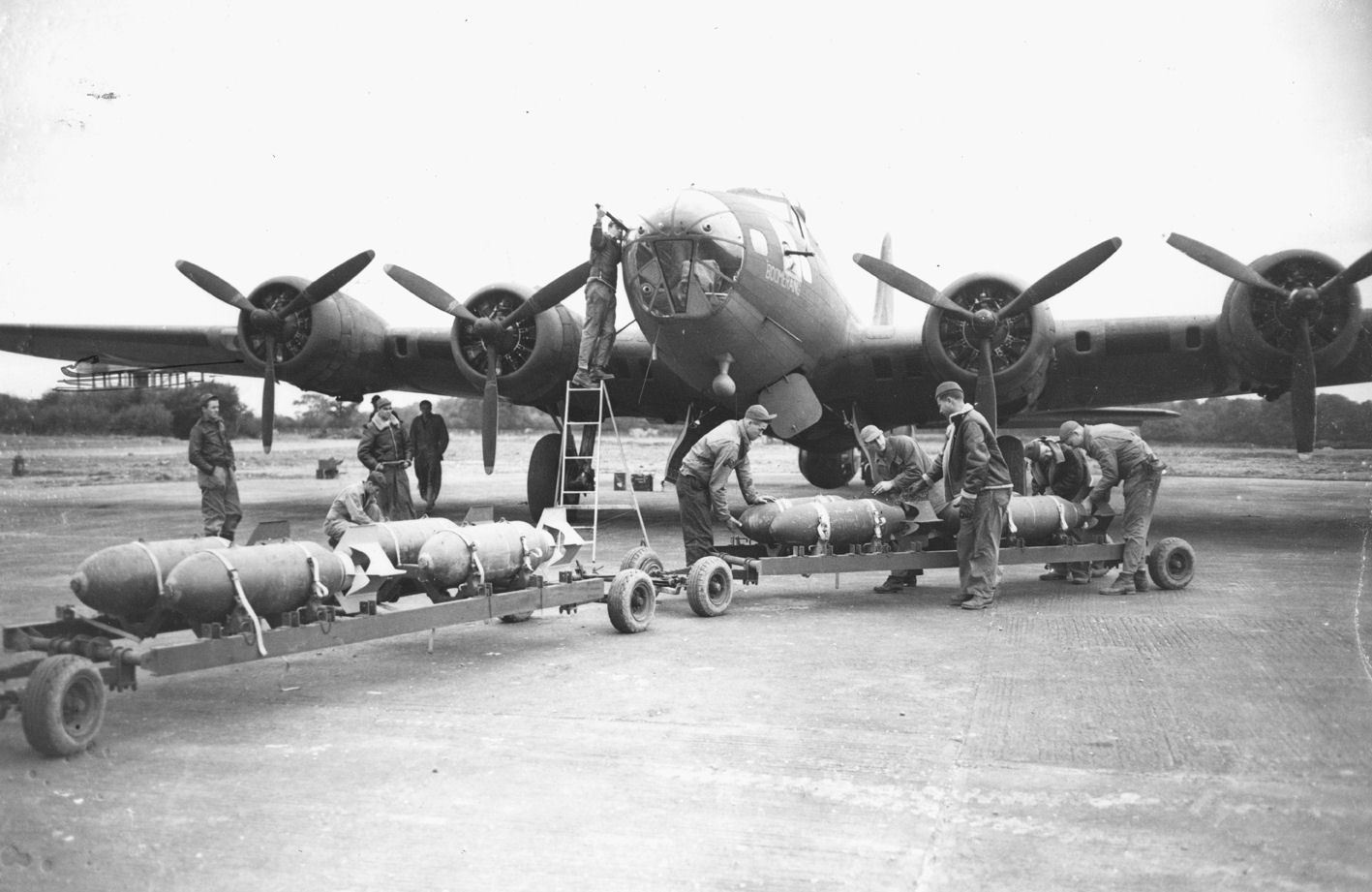
Ground crew of the 92nd Bomb Group load bombs into a B-17 Flying Fortress (AAF Ser. No. 41-9148) nicknamed "Boomerang" at Bovingdon, 17 October 1942.

The first USAAF tenant at Bovingdon was the 92nd Bombardment Group (Heavy), being deployed from Sarasota Army Air Field, Florida. The group was known as "Fame's Favored Few", and it was assigned to the 40th Combat Bombardment Wing at RAF Thurleigh. The group tail code was a "Triangle B". Its operational squadrons were:

- 325th Bombardment Squadron (NV)
- 326th Bombardment Squadron (JW)
- 327th Bombardment Squadron (UX)
- 407th Bombardment Squadron (PY)

The group flew a few two combat missions in September and October 1942, then was assigned the role of a Boeing B-17 Flying Fortress Combat Crew Replacement Unit (CCRU). In January 1943, it was transferred to RAF Alconbury where it became an operational combat group.

=== 11th Combat Crew Replacement Center Group ===
Although the 92nd Bomb Group departed for Alconbury, the 326th Bomb Squadron of the 92nd remained at Bovingdon to form the core of 11th Combat Crew Replacement Center Group. The training was performed on the Boeing B-17E Flying Fortress aircraft, and most combat crews of Eighth Air Force bombing units for the balance of the war received their introduction before moving on to their operational bases. Although based at Bovingdon, the 326th remained under the operational control of the 92nd at Alconbury until May 1943.

In September 1944 the 11th CCRCG was disbanded and Bovingdon became the base for the European Air Transport Service (EATS). Many thousands of Americans returned to the States via the air terminal.

== Postwar uses ==
After the war, Bovingdon was returned to RAF control on 15 April 1947. The Ministry of Civil Aviation obtained the airfield for civilian airline use. On 15 September 1949 Bovingdon was the starting point for a successful record air speed attempt by a de Havilland Hornet to and from Gibraltar.

Owing to its elevation at about 160 metres, Bovingdon was often clear when Heathrow Airport and RAF Northolt were fog-bound; during the winter months especially, Bovingdon was used by British European Airways (BEA). British Overseas Airways Corporation (BOAC) used Bovingdon as a maintenance facility and numerous other independent aircraft operators used the former technical site during the postwar years.

During the 1950s both civilian and military organizations used Bovingdon. The proximity of the USAF Third Air Force Headquarters at RAF South Ruislip and HQ RAF Fighter Command at Bentley Priory made Bovingdon the ideal location for service aircraft.

The USAF returned to Bovingdon on 25 May 1951, with the establishment of the 7531st Air Base Squadron. Douglas C-47 Skytrains were assigned to the unit, however many transitory USAF planes used the airfield routinely. In addition, the RAF operated the Fighter Command Communication Squadron RAF on the station. In October 1962, the USAF departed from Bovingdon. During the 1960s, RAF Transport Command (Southern Communication Squadron RAF) operated Anson, Devon, Pembroke and latterly Basset aircraft from Bovingdon. In the 1960s the base was home to the last flight of Anson Mk 21 aircraft, descended from a World War II design.

The Air Training Corps 617 Gliding School operated from Bovingdon between 1968 and 1970; the last flight by a military aircraft was by Kirby Cadet Mk.3 glider XN246 on 25 Oct 1970. The school had moved from RAF Hendon in 1968, but moved on to RAF Manston in 1971. In 1968 the airfield was used to store and dispose of several aircraft used in the making of the film "Battle of Britain".

== Closure and civilian use ==
In 1968, the Ministry of Defence (MOD) announced that Bovingdon would be closed for budgetary reasons, and in 1972 the airfield was shut down – although from the Second World War to the present day, the runway, 650m long × 49m wide, on Berry Farm has continuously been used for light aircraft activities. Berry Farm is owned separately by the Webb family and is unconnected to the part of the original airfield where the land has been used for various other uses, including the market. In 2012 Dacorum Borough Council confirmed that the Berry Farm stretch of runway 08/26 remains a legally active airfield for light aircraft operation.

In the early 1980s flying returned to the airfield, first with hang-glider tow-launching (using a truck-mounted pay-out winch) and then microlight aircraft, mainly of the 'Trike/hang-glider' type. Some local residents complained on the grounds of noise and danger. After a local inquiry, the Ombudsman narrowly decided against allowing flying to continue. At that time the combined control tower and fire-tender garage were in 'reasonable structural condition' but deliberately damaged a few years later by earthmoving equipment, thereafter making restoration highly unlikely. The remains of the control tower were demolished in August 2010.

An area of the former technical site was transferred to HM Prison Service for use as a prison, called 'The Mount' which opened in 1987.

The airfield site still houses a VOR navigational beacon, code BNN. The airspace above the airfield and nearby Chesham is known as the Bovingdon stack and is a holding area for aircraft approaching Heathrow Airport, 32 kilometres (20 mi) to the south. Aircraft are requested to join the hold, typically at an altitude of 7000–16000 feet, and then to fly a 'race-track' pattern around the Bovingdon VOR beacon, separated at vertical intervals of 1000 feet from other aircraft. Each aircraft is then instructed to descend to a lower available altitude as the lowest aircraft leaves the hold to make its final approach to Heathrow. At busy times there may be up to 10 aircraft holding at the available 1000 foot separations between 7000 feet and 16000 feet, and these may be seen circling overhead on a clear day.

The remainder of the airfield site was used for a regular Saturday market, and there was also a permanent circuit for banger racing which closed in September 2008. The main runway and taxiways are still intact though in a poor state of repair, but are also used for other events such as autojumbles and classic car shows. Alongside a runway is a Delta Force Paintballing facility. The ruins of the control tower also remain.

It was reported in September 2021 that new studios would be added to the Airfield and that Bovingdon Market would be closing down due to the new studios. It was confirmed on the Bovingdon Market Facebook page in March 2022 that the market would be ceasing trading on the site after 40 years of trading due to television works taking over the airfield with 3 new studios, new offices and a backlot being added to the site. The final day of trading for Bovingdon Market was 29 August 2022.

== Bovingdon Studios ==
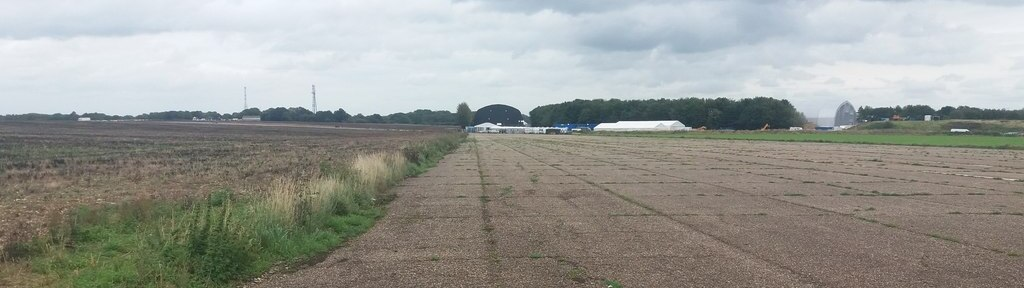
Public footpath, running alongside the old runway, heading towards the studios (2020)

ITV Studios Bovingdon (also known as Bovingdon Airfield Studios) is a television studio complex operated by ITV Studios. The first studios opened in January 2018. ITV Bovingdon currently has one full sized studio which was purpose built for Dancing on Ice. A number of other productions are also filmed at ITV Studios Bovingdon including Michael McIntyre's The Wheel and The Masked Singer.

In September 2021, it was announced that ITV Studio Bovingdon had submitted plans to expand the studio capacity by building three new permanent studios, new office spaces, a backlot for temporary studios and sets. The plans were granted in 2022 this will take the number of studios at ITV Bovingdon to 4 once completed along with a backlot. It was reported in August 2022 that ITV Bovingdon's new backlot will become home of the new Big Brother UK house which will return to ITV in 2023. However in May 2023, it was confirmed that the house would be located at Garden Studios in North London and included "versatile staging", as well as an "in-house virtual production studio".

Future development will include four additional studios and seven backlot areas. The four new sound stages and seven new backlot areas officially opened in late 2022 early 2023 with the studios taking bookings. The studios also have 13 workshop buildings.

=== Studios and sound stages ===
- Studio 1 (also known as ITV Studios) – 2,088 square metres (22,483 ft²) – Studio 1 is currently home to programmes such as Dancing on Ice, The Masked Singer, The Wheel and The Masked Dancer. The studio can accommodate audiences and an ice rink. Studio 1 opened in January 2018 with Dancing on Ice being the first series to be filmed there.
- Stage A – 1,744 square metres (18,780 ft²)
- Stage B – 2,322 square metres (25,000 ft²)
- Stage C – 1,858 square metres (20,000 ft²)
- Stage D – 2,322 square metres (25,000 ft²)

=== Backlots ===
The triangle backlot was used for the filming of the 2019 film 1917 and the 2014 film Fury. The main runway backlot was used for the filming of 2018 film Bohemian Rhapsody Live Aid stage and for the 2013 Fast & Furious 6 plane crash scene. The production pad is for large set-builds, storage and temporary pop-up stages.

- Backlot 1 (Triangle Backlot) – 62,000m2
- Backlot 2 (Corner Backlot) – 28,100m2
- Backlot 3 (Control Tower Backlot) – 12,400m2
- Backlot 4 (Perimeter Backlot) – 13,354m2
- Backlot 5 (Radar Backlot) – 65,700m2
- Backlot 6 (Main runway Backlot) – 42,750m2
- Backlot 7 (Production Pad) – 8,000m2

=== Programmes ===
The studios are home to many television programmes, including:

Years	Programme	Network	Studio	Ref
2018–2025	Dancing on Ice	ITV	Studio 1	
2020–present	The Masked Singer	ITV	Studio 1	
2020–present	The Wheel	BBC One	Studio 1	
2021–2022	The Masked Dancer	ITV	Studio 1	
2022–2023	Starstruck	ITV	Studio 1	
2022–present	The Lord of the Rings: The Rings of Power	Amazon Prime Video	—N/a	

†	Upcoming programmes

=== Other film and television appearances ===
In the 1960s, Bovingdon was used in the production of four World War II films, The War Lover (1962); 633 Squadron (1964) Battle of Britain (1969) and Mosquito Squadron (1969). Although flying ceased at the airfield in 1969, it was also used to film parts of the flying car scenes in the James Bond film The Man With the Golden Gun starring Roger Moore, when the palm trees fold down as it takes off. In 1977, parts of the Golden Gate Bridge sequence from Superman were filmed on one of the runways. In 1978, some flying scenes for the film Hanover Street were shot there. The site was also used in the 2016 Star Wars film Rogue One, representing the planet Scarif. The studios are the primary production hub for Sam Mendes' Beatles biopics.

On television, it served as the location for at least one black and white episode of The Avengers, "The Hour That Never Was", starring Patrick Macnee and Diana Rigg, featuring Gerald Harper and Roy Kinnear, as well as the 1980 Blake's 7 episode "The Harvest of Kairos" as the surface of the planet Kairos. An airstrip at the airfield is also reputed to have been used in the opening credits of the 1967 television series The Prisoner, in which Patrick McGoohan is seen driving a Lotus Super Seven car past the camera at speed. The control tower and airfield was the filming location for the 1981 movie Silver Dream Racer starring David Essex and Beau Bridges. In the movie, the montage scene before the final race shows Essex and Christina Raines training for the forthcoming grand prix. It has continued to be used in various TV shows up to the present day. The airfield has also been used in the production of the film Bohemian Rhapsody, as the production crew were required to recreate the 1985 Live Aid set.

== Major units assigned ==
Royal Air Force

- No. 150 Staging Post RAF (9 August 1946 – 18 February 1947)
- Flying Training Command Communication Squadron RAF (9 July 1947 – 30 June 1963)
- Bomber Command Communication Squadron RAF (31 March – 30 June 1963)
- Bomber/Fighter/Coastal Command Communication Squadron RAF (30 June – 1 August 1963)
- Southern Communication Squadron RAF (1 August 1963 – 1 January 1969)
- No. 617 Volunteer Gliding School RAF (1968 – September 1969)
- Strike Command Communication Squadron RAF (1–27 January 1969)

United States Army Air Forces

- 11th Combat Crew Replacement Unit (January 1943 – September 1944)
- 92d Bombardment Group (18 August 1942 – 6 January 1943)
- 1402nd Air Base Group (October 1944 – April 1946)

United States Air Force

- 7531st Air Base Squadron (25 May 1951 – 1962)
- 2130 Communications Group (1961 to 1991)

== See also ==
- List of former Royal Air Force stations
