= HM Prison The Mount =

Men's prison in Hertfordshire, England

Coordinates: 51°43′30″N 0°32′27″W

HMP The Mount
- Interactive map of HMP The Mount
- Location: Bovingdon, Hertfordshire
- Security class: Adult Male/Category C
- Population: 1001 (May 2022)
- Opened: 1987
- Managed by: HM Prison Services
- Governor: John Gormley
- Website: The Mount at justice.gov.uk

HM Prison The Mount is a Category C men's prison, located on the outskirts of Bovingdon village in Hertfordshire, England. The Mount Prison is operated by His Majesty's Prison Service.

== History ==
The Mount Prison was designed as a Category C Training prison built on the site of the former Bovingdon RAF station. However, when the establishment opened in 1987, it was used as a Young Offenders Institution for males aged 18 to 21. Today the prison is used to hold Category C adult male prisoners.

In November 1994, two inmates escaped from The Mount in a violent break-out. The pair attacked a civilian instructor, tied him up and fled from the bricklaying workshop being held inside the prison. The instructor was taken to hospital suffering from a fractured skull.

In February 2005, an inspection report from His Majesty's Chief Inspector of Prisons condemned The Mount Prison, claiming that the jail's drug problem was out of control and threatened the security and safety of prisoners. According to the report, nearly half of the inmates said they felt unsafe, 25% had been victims of bullying, and another 44% said that it was easy to obtain illegal drugs. The inspection also found significant tensions among ethnic minorities at the prison and unclean conditions.

In 2007, The Mount Prison partnered with Hertfordshire Highways to have inmates repair damaged roadwork signs. The prison announced the contract under which offenders who are learning metalwork, welding and painting skills will repair the broken road signs.

In January 2013, the Ministry of Justice announced that an additional houseblock would be constructed at The Mount Prison, increasing the capacity of the jail.

In April 2015, a prisoner was stabbed with a shard of glass and almost bled to death.

In summer 2016, the prison's Independent Monitoring Board (IMB) reported that, "all the ingredients were in place for The Mount to suffer disorder such as has been experienced in other prisons – staff shortages, readily available drugs, mounting violence".

In July 2017, riot-trained staff were brought into Mount Prison to deal with a disturbance. For a time, prison staff had lost control of two wings, but order was later restored. Another incident ensued the following day, when armed prisoners took control of Nash Wing and broke windows.

== The prison today ==
The Mount is a Category C prison for adult males. As of 31 August 2015, it had an operational capacity of 1,028. The regime at the prison includes full- and part-time education, workshops, training courses, farms and gardens, and a works department. Other features include listener groups (a community-based project to keep juveniles out of prison), a job skills course, and prisoner-led drug-free meetings.

According to a report, Mount Prison experiences severe staff shortages, which inmates' relatives have claimed results in prisoners being locked in their cells over weekends. The Mount was given the second lowest rating out of four by the National Offender Management Service (NOMS), which said performance was "of concern". In November 2016, the drug problem had reached such an extent that many prisoners were suffering serious health effects, which led to 70 mainly drug-related emergency callouts during the month. Spice is a "big concern" according to prison staff. Staff have left due to uncompetitive salaries, and many of the empty posts have remained unfilled. An IMB report said: “Experienced staff have left and not been fully replaced, so that at the end of February there were 24 vacancies out of a complement of 136 officers, and a high proportion of officers and managers had less than two years’ experience.”

In the report relating to the 2018 inspection, the chief executive of HMPPS stated "The Mount is improving after a difficult period and there are robust plans in place to accelerate progress.

“An additional 30 prison officers will be working on landings by December and a strengthened violence reduction strategy is being implemented. The prison is also increasing purposeful activity, finding a new education provider and has appointed a dedicated manager to make sure the prison is caring appropriately for its diverse population.

“A comprehensive action plan will be published to address the wider recommendations in this report and we will be monitoring progress closely."

The prison operates a number of training programme such as bicycle refurbishment, bricklaying, plastering, woodworking, window frame manufacture and car mechanics. It also offers a programme called Redemption Roasters, which enables prisoners to learn how to roast coffee and develop skills in producing ground coffee. The coffee produced is used to supply coffee shops within the prison service.
