= List of Royal Air Force Communication units =

This is a List of Royal Air Force Communication units. "Communication" in the Royal Air Force sense meant units of light transport/liaison aircraft, very frequently supporting a command headquarters.

To allow rapid transport of air officers, staff and other important people many units and Headquarters operated communication Sections, Flights, Squadrons or wings.

A single wing of this type, the 2nd Tactical Air Force Communication Wing RAF, was established on 31 March 1945, and disbanded only three and a half months later at RAF Buckeburg on 15 July 1945, by being reduced to the British Air Forces of Occupation Communication Squadron.

== Squadrons ==
Unit	Formed on	Formed at	Disbanded on	Disbanded at	Notes
Aden Communication Squadron RAF	1 December 1951	RAF Khormaksar	31 August 1955	RAF Khormaksar	Became Aden Protectorate Communication and Support Squadron RAF
Aden Protectorate Communication and Support Squadron RAF	1 September 1955	RAF Khormaksar	31 December 1956	RAF Khormaksar	Became No. 84 Squadron RAF
Air Command Far East and Air Headquarters Malaya Communication Squadron RAF	21 August 1946	RAF Changi	15 January 1947	RAF Changi	Disbanded
Air Component Field Force Communication Squadron RAF	25 August 1939	RAF Andover	27 November 1939	RAF Mont Jois	Became No. 81 Squadron RAF
Air Defence of Great Britain Communication Squadron RAF	1 May 1944	RAF Northolt	16 October 1944	RAF Northolt	Became Fighter Command Communication Squadron RAF
Air Division Communication Squadron RAF	18 December 1945	RAF Lubeck	8 August 1946	RAF Detmold	Disbanded
Air Forces Gulf Communication Squadron RAF	15 September 1967	RAF Muharraq	8 August 1969	RAF Muharraq	Disbanded
Air Headquarters Burma Communication Squadron RAF	20 September 1945	RAF Baigachi	14 November 1945	RAF Mingaladon	Became Air Headquarters Burma Communication Flight RAF
Air Headquarters East Africa Communication Squadron RAF	1 November 1940	RAF Nairobi	15 December 1941	RAF Eastleigh	Disbanded
Air Headquarters Hong Kong Communication Squadron RAF	12 September 1945	RAF Kai Tak	15 January 1947	RAF Kai Tak	Disbanded
Air Headquarters India Communication Squadron RAF	1 March 1946	RAF Willingdon	15 August 1947	RAF Palam	Became Supreme Commanders Headquarters (Air) Communication Squadron RAF
Air Headquarters Italy Communication Squadron RAF	10 November 1945	RAF Marcianise	15 August 1946	RAF Marcianise	Became Air Headquarters Italy Communication Flight RAF
Air Headquarters Malaya Communication Squadron RAF	1 November 1945	RAF Kallang	15 January 1947	RAF Changi	Disbanded
Air Headquarters Malta Communication Squadron RAF	31 May 1946	RAF Hal Far	1 July 1954	RAF Luqa	Became Malta Communication and Target Towing Squadron RAF
Air Headquarters Netherlands East Indies Communication Squadron RAF	1 November 1945	RAF Mingaladon	21 August 1946	Kemajoran	Disbanded
Allied Air Forces Central Europe Communication Squadron RAF	April 1951	RAF Melun-Villaroche	1966	RAF Melun-Villaroche	Disbanded
Allied Expeditionary Air Force Communication Squadron RAF	6 April 1944	RAF Heston	15 October 1944	RAF Heston	Became Supreme Headquarters Allied Expeditionary Force (RAF) Communication Squadron RAF
Base Air Forces, Southeast Asia Communication Squadron RAF	1 October 1944	RAF Willingdon	1 March 1946	RAF Palam	Became Air Headquarters India Communication Squadron RAF National Archives record
Bomber Command Communication Squadron RAF	1 February 1956	RAF Halton	30 June 1963	RAF Bovingdon	Became Bomber/Fighter/Coastal Commands Communication Squadron RAF
Bomber/Fighter/Coastal Command Communication Squadron RAF	1 July 1963	RAF Bovingdon	1 August 1963	RAF Bovingdon	Became Southern Communication Squadron RAF
British Air Forces of Occupation Communication Squadron RAF	15 July 1945	RAF Bückeburg	1 September 1951	RAF Bückeburg	Became 2nd Tactical Air Force Communication Squadron
British Commonwealth Air Communication Squadron RAF	1 January 1946	RAF Iwakuni	31 March 1948	RAF Iwakuni	Disbanded
Coastal Command Communication Squadron RAF	7 April 1945	RAF Leavesden	1 May 1946	RAF Leavesden	Became Bomber/Fighter/Coastal Command Communication Squadron RAF
Colerne Communication Squadron RAF	30 July 1952	RAF Colerne	1 July 1957	RAF Colerne	Absorbed by No. 81 Group Communication Squadron RAF
Communication Squadron, GHQ Royal Air Force, France RAF	1 April 1918	RAF Berck-sur-Mer	November 1918	RAF Bickendorf	Disbanded
Communication Squadron, Hendon RAF	23 July 1918	RAF Hendon	27 July 1918	RAF Hendon	Became No. 1 (Communication) Squadron RAF
Far East Communication Squadron RAF	16 October 1947	RAF Changi	January 1960	RAF Changi	Became part of No. 52 Squadron RAF
Fighter Command Communication Squadron RAF	16 October 1944	RAF Northolt	30 June 1963	RAF Bovingdon	Became Bomber/Fighter/Coastal Command Communication Squadron RAF
Flying Training Command Communication Squadron RAF	1 April 1959	RAF White Waltham	1 April 1964	RAF White Waltham	Disbanded
No. 2 Group Communication Squadron RAF	10 October 1945	B.56 Brussels/Evere	29 May 1946	B.56 Brussels/Evere	Reverted to No. 2 Group Communication Flight RAF
No. 83 Group Communication Squadron RAF	1 March 1944 1 October 1946 7 September 1952	RAF Redhill Unknown RAF Wahn	5 May 1946 Unknown 3 May 1958	B.164 RAF Schleswigland Unknown Wahn	Disbanded
No. 84 Group Communication Squadron RAF	1 March 1944	Cowley Barracks	30 November 1947	B.61 St. Denis Westrem	Disbanded
No. 85 Group Communication Squadron RAF	1 May 1944	RAF Castle Camps	29 May 1946	RAF Heston	Became No. 85 Group Communication Flight RAF
No. 88 Group Communication Squadron RAF	10 May 1945	RAF Turnhouse	30 September 1945	RAF Gardermoen	Disbanded
No. 221 Group Communication Squadron RAF	1 January 1945	RAF Kalemyo	1 November 1945	RAF Mingaladon	Became Air Headquarters Netherlands East Indies Communication Squadron RAF
No. 232 Group Communication Squadron RAF	27 February 1945	RAF Comilla	31 March 1946	RAF Rangoon	Disbanded
No. 238 Group Communication Squadron RAF	20 April 1945	RAF Bilaspur	15 October 1945	RAF Bilaspur	Disbanded
Headquarters Air Command Southeast Asia (Communication) Squadron RAF	31 January 1944	RAF Willingdon	30 September 1946	RAF Changi	Air Command Far East and Air Headquarters Malaya Communication Squadron RAF
Headquarters British Forces Aden Communication Squadron RAF	21 March 1943	RAF Khormaksar	1 December 1951	RAF Khormaksar	Became Aden Communication Squadron RAF
Headquarters Middle East Air Force Communication Squadron RAF	1 December 1954	RAF Nicosia	1 February 1946	RAF Nicosia	Became Middle East Command Communication Squadron RAF
Headquarters Middle East Communication Squadron RAF	1 June 1949	RAF Kabrit	30 November 1949	RAF Kabrit	Disbanded
Headquarters Royal Air Force Burma Communication Squadron RAF	21 April 1945	RAF Baigachi	20 September 1945	RAF Baigachi	Became Air Headquarters Burma Communication Squadron RAF
Headquarters Royal Air Force Northern Ireland Communication Squadron RAF	19 November 1942	RAF Sydenham	31 March 1950	RAF Aldergrove	Became No. 67 Group Communication Flight RAF
Home Command Communication Squadron RAF	1 August 1950	RAF White Waltham	1 April 1959	RAF White Waltham	Became Flying Training Command Communication Squadron RAF
Maintenance Command Communication and Ferry Squadron RAF	1 November 1960	RAF Andover	1 April 1964	RAF Andover	Disbanded into Western Communication Squadron RAF
Malta Communication and Target Towing Squadron RAF	1 July 1954	RAF Luqa	1 August 1963	RAF Ta Kali	Became Malta Communication Flight RAF
Mediterranean and Middle East Communication Squadron RAF	1 February 1944	RAF Maison Blanche	1 June 1949	RAF Kabrit	Became Headquarters Middle East Communication Squadron RAF
Metropolitan Communication Squadron RAF	8 April 1944	RAF Hendon	3 February 1969	RAF Northolt	Became No. 32 Squadron RAF
Middle East Command Communication Squadron RAF	1 October 1961	RAF Khormaksar	15 June 1965	RAF Khormaksar	Became Middle East Command Communication Flight RAF
Middle East Communication Squadron RAF	29 February 1944	RAF Heliopolis	10 November 1945	RAF Heliopolis	Became Mediterranean and Middle East Communication Squadron RAF
Middle East Communications Squadron RAF	16 September 1967	RAF Khormaksar	17 September 1967	RAF Khormaksar	Disbanded into No. 84 Squadron RAF
Northern Communication Squadron RAF	1 October 1964	RAF Topcliffe	1 January 1967	RAF Topcliffe	Became Training Commands Communication Squadron RAF
Reserve Command Communication Squadron RAF	10 September 1946	RAF White Waltham	1 August 1950	RAF White Waltham	Became Home Command Communication Squadron RAF
Royal Air Force Bengal/Burma Communication Squadron RAF	4 December 1944	RAF Baigachi	21 April 1945	RAF Baigachi	Became Headquarters Royal Air Force Burma Communication Squadron RAF
Royal Air Force Germany Communication Squadron RAF	1 January 1959	RAF Wildenrath	3 February 1969	RAF Wildenrath	Became No. 60 Squadron RAF
Southern Communication Squadron RAF	1 August 1963	RAF Bovingdon	1 January 1969	RAF Bovingdon	Became Strike Command Communication Squadron RAF
Strike Command Communication Squadron RAF	1 January 1969	RAF Bovingdon	3 February 1969	RAF Northolt	Became No. 207 Squadron RAF
Special Communication Squadron RAF	1 January 1951	RAF Kabrit	1 September 1952	RAF Fayid	Became Middle East Air Force Special Communication Flight RAF
No. 1 (Communication) Squadron RAF	27 July 1918	RAF Hendon	8 October 1919	RAF Kenley	Disbanded
No. 2 (Communication) Squadron RAF	1 March 1919	RAF Buc	8 October 1919	RAF Kenley	Disbanded
No. 3 (Communication) Squadron RAF	February 1919	RAF Hounslow	March 1919	RAF Hounslow	Absorbed by No. 86 Wing Headquarters Flight RAF
No. 4 (Communication) Squadron RAF	5 January 1919	RAF Felixstowe	31 December 1919	RAF Felixstowe	Absorbed by No. 230 Squadron RAF
No. 5 (Communication) Squadron RAF	March 1919	RAF Bircham Newton	15 June 1919	RAF Bircham Newton	Became No. 274 Squadron RAF
No. 6 (Communication) Squadron RAF	March 1919	RAF Bircham Newton	1 October 1919	RAF Bircham Newton	Disbanded
No. 7 (Communication) Squadron RAF	March 1919	RAF Bircham Newton	1 October 1919	RAF Bircham Newton	Disbanded
No. 8 (Communication) Squadron RAF	March 1919	RAF Bircham Newton	September 1919	RAF Bircham Newton	Disbanded
Supreme Commander's Headquarters (Air) Communication Squadron RAF	15 August 1947	RAF Palam	17 December 1947	RAF Palam	Royal Air Force Communication Flight
Supreme Headquarters Allied Expeditionary Force (RAF) Communication Squadron RAF	15 October 1944	RAF Heston	31 July 1945	RAF Detmold	Disbanded
Tactical Air Force (Burma) Communication Squadron RAF	1 December 1943	RAF Comilla	28 December 1943	RAF Comilla	Became 3rd Tactical Air Force Communication Squadron RAF
2nd Tactical Air Force Communication Squadron RAF	1 April 1944 1 September 1951	RAF Hartford Bridge RAF Buckeburg	31 March 1945 1 January 1959	RAF Buckeburg RAF Wildenrath	Became British Air Forces of Occupation Communication Squadron Became Royal Air Force Germany Communication Squadron RAF
3rd Tactical Air Force Communication Squadron RAF	28 December 1943	RAF Comilla	4 December 1944	RAF Comilla	Became Royal Air Force Bengal/Burma Communication Squadron RAF
Training Commands Communication Squadron RAF	1 January 1967	RAF Topcliffe	3 February 1969	RAF Wyton	Became No. 26 Squadron RAF
Transport Command Communication Squadron RAF	1959/61	RAF Upavon	1 April 1964	[RAF Upavon	Absorbed by the Western Communication Squadron RAF
Turnhouse Communication Squadron RAF	1 October 1952	RAF Turnhouse	28 February 1958	RAF Turnhouse	Disbanded
West Africa Command Communication Squadron RAF	July 1945	Unknown	1 November 1945	RAF Accra	Became West Africa Communication Squadron RAF
West Africa Communication Squadron RAF	31 May 1944 1 October 1946	RAF Waterloo, Sierra Leone RAF Takoradi	July 1945 25 September 1947	Unknown RAF Takoradi	Became West Africa Command Communication Squadron RAF Disbanded
West Africa Transport and Communication Squadron RAF	1 November 1945	RAF Accra, Gold Coast	1 October 1946	RAF Takoradi, Gold Coast	Became West Africa Communication Squadron
Western Communication Squadron RAF	1 April 1964	RAF Andover	3 February 1969	RAF Andover	Became No. 21 Squadron RAF
No. 85 Wing Communication Squadron RAF	1 July 1946	RAF Ghent	November 1948	RAF Utersen	Became No. 85 Wing Communication Flight RAF

== Units ==
Unit	Formed on	Formed at	Disbanded on	Disbanded at	Notes
Aden Communication Unit RAF	1 January 1944	Khormaksar	January 1946	Khormaksar	Became Headquarters British Forces Aden Communication Flight
Air Command Southeast Asia Communication Unit RAF	1 November 1943	Willingdon, India	31 January 1944	Willingdon, India	Became Headquarters Air Command Southeast Asia Communication Squadron
Air Headquarters Bengal Communication Unit RAF	24 March 1943	Barrackpore, Bengal	1 December 1943	Comilla, India	Became Tactical Air Force (Burma) Communication Squadron
Communication Unit, Desert Air Force RAF	1 July 1943	Sorman, Libya	1 June 1944	Orvieto, Italy	Became Desert Air Force Communication Flight
Communication Unit, Heliopolis RAF	18 January 1940	Heliopolis	19 August 1940	Heliopolis	Became No. 267 Squadron RAF
Communication Unit, Western Desert RAF	27 April 1942	Ma'aten Bagush, Egypt	1 July 1943	Sorman, Libya	Became Communication Unit, Desert Air Force
Mediterranean Air Command Communication Unit RAF	2 August 1943	Maison Blanche, Algeria	1 February 1944	Maison Blanche, Algeria	Disbanded

== Flights ==
Unit	Formed on	Formed at	Disbanded on	Disbanded at	Notes
No. 1 (Communication) Flight (Kenya Auxiliary Air Unit) RAF	6 September 1939	RAF Nairobi, Kenya	1 November 1940	RAF Nairobi	Merged and became the Air Headquarters East Africa Communication Squadron
No. 1 (Indian) Group Communication Flight RAF	15 August 1945	RAF Peshawar, India	15 August 1947	RAF Peshawar	Became Air Headquarters Pakistan Communication Flight
No. 2 (Indian) Group Communication Flight RAF	1 May 1946	RAF Yelahanka, India	15 August 1947	RAF Yelahanka	Became 2 Group Communication Flight, Indian Air Force
No. 3 (Indian) Group Communication Flight RAF	1 May 1946	RAF Barrackpore, India	31 May 1947	RAF Barrackpore	Disbanded
No. 1 Group Communication Flight RAF					
No. 2 Group Communication Flight RAF					
No. 3 Group Communication Flight RAF					
No. 4 Group Communication Flight RAF					
No. 5 Group Communication Flight RAF					
No. 6 Group Communication Flight RAF					
No. 7 Group Communication Flight RAF					
No. 8 Group Communication Flight RAF					
No. 9 Group Communication Flight RAF					
No. 10 Group Communication Flight RAF					
No. 11 Group Communication Flight RAF					
No. 12 Group Communication Flight RAF					
No. 13 Group Communication Flight RAF					
No. 14 Group Communication Flight RAF					
No. 15 Group Communication Flight RAF					
No. 16 Group Communication Flight RAF					
No. 17 Group Communication Flight RAF					
No. 18 Group Communication Flight RAF					
No. 19 Group Communication Flight RAF					
No. 21 Group Communication Flight RAF					
No. 22 Group Communication Flight RAF					
No. 23 Group Communication Flight RAF					
No. 24 Group Communication Flight RAF					
No. 25 Group Communication Flight RAF					
No. 27 Group Communication Flight RAF					
No. 29 Group Communication Flight RAF					
No. 38 Group Communication Flight RAF					
No. 40 Group Communication Flight RAF					
No. 42 Group Communication Flight RAF					
No. 43 Group Communication Flight RAF					
No. 44 Group Communication Flight RAF					
No. 45 Group Communication Flight RAF					
No. 46 Group Communication Flight RAF					
No. 47 Group Communication Flight RAF					
No. 48 Group Communication Flight RAF					
No. 50 Group Communication Flight RAF					
No. 51 Group Communication Flight RAF					
No. 54 Group Communication Flight RAF					
No. 60 Group Communication Flight RAF					
No. 61 Group Communication Flight RAF					
No. 62 Group Communication Flight RAF					
No. 63 Group Communication Flight RAF					
No. 64 Group Communication Flight RAF					
No. 66 Group Communication Flight RAF					
No. 67 Group Communication Flight RAF					7
No. 70 Group Communication Flight RAF					
No. 71 Group Communication Flight RAF					
No. 80 Group Communication Flight RAF					
No. 81 Group Communication Flight RAF					
No. 82 Group Communication Flight RAF					
No. 83 Group Communication Flight RAF					
No. 84 Group Communication Flight RAF					
No. 85 Group Communication Flight RAF	November 1948	RAF Utersen	1 March 1950	RAF Utersen	Disbanded
No. 87 Group Communication Flight RAF	15 May 1945	RAF Buc, France	1 July 1946	RAF Buc	Became No. 87 Wing Communication Flight
No. 88 Group Communication Flight RAF					
No. 91 Group Communication Flight RAF					
No. 92 Group Communication Flight RAF					
No. 93 Group Communication Flight RAF					
No. 100 Group Communication Flight RAF					
No. 106 Group Communication Flight RAF					
No. 201 Group Communication Flight RAF					
No. 202 Group Communication Flight RAF					
No. 203 Group Communication Flight RAF					
No. 204 Group Communication Flight RAF					
No. 205 Group Communication Flight RAF					
No. 206 Group Communication Flight RAF					
No. 207 Group Communication Flight RAF					
No. 210 Group Communication Flight RAF					
No. 211 Group Communication Flight RAF					
No. 212 Group Communication Flight RAF					
No. 216 Group Communication Flight RAF					
No. 218 Group Communication Flight RAF					
No. 219 Group Communication Flight RAF					
No. 221 Group Communication Flight RAF					
No. 222 Group Communication Flight RAF					
No. 223 Group Communication Flight RAF					
No. 224 Group Communication Flight RAF					
No. 225 Group Communication Flight RAF					
No. 226 Group Communication Flight RAF					
No. 227 Group Communication Flight RAF					
No. 228 Group Communication Flight RAF					
No. 229 Group Communication Flight RAF					
No. 230 Group Communication Flight RAF					
No. 231 Group Communication Flight RAF					
No. 232 Group Communication Flight RAF					
No. 238 Group Communication Flight RAF					
No. 242 Group Communication Flight RAF					
No. 85 Wing Communication Flight RAF	10 May 1947	Unk	1 October 1947	RAF Utersen	Disbanded
No. 87 Wing Communication Flight RAF	1 July 1946	RAF Buc	26 August 1946	RAF Buc, France	Royal Air Force Delegation (France) Communication Flight
2nd Tactical Air Force Communication Flight RAF	1 June 1943	RAF White Waltham	1 April 1944	RAF Hartford Bridge	Became 2nd Tactical Air Force Communication Squadron
Air Defence of Great Britain Communication Flight RAF	January 1930 1 May 1944	RAF Northolt	February 1936 1944	RAF Northolt	Absorbed by Northolt Station Flight Reformed as part of the Air Defence of Great Britain Communication Squadron. Disbanded.
Air Headquarters Austria Communication Flight RAF	5 October 1945	RAF Klagenfurt, Austria	15 August 1946	RAF Klagenfurt	Became Austria Commission Flight
Air Headquarters Burma Communication Flight RAF	14 November 1945	RAF Mingaladon	1 December 1947	RAF Mingaladon	Disbanded
Air Headquarters Ceylon Communication Flight RAF	15 October 1945	RAF Ratmalana, Ceylon	15 January 1947	RAF Negombo, Ceylon	Disbanded
Air Headquarters Communication Flight Iraq and Persia RAF	1 July 1945	RAF Habbaniya, Iraq	1 March 1946	RAF Habbaniya	Became Air Headquarters Iraq Communication Flight
Air Headquarters East Africa Communication Flight RAF	16 November 1942 1 August 1944 September 1954	RAF Eastleigh, Kenya	February 1944 15 September 1951 Unk	RAF Eastleigh	Became the Air Transport Flight Became the Eastleigh Communication Flight Disbanded
Air Headquarters Eastern Mediterranean Communication Flight RAF	1 February 1944	RAF Mariut, Eqypt	15 March 1946	RAF Mariut	Disbanded
Air Headquarters Egypt Communication Flight RAF	31 August 1944	RAF Heliopolis, Eqypt	1 April 1946	RAF Heliopolis	Absorbed by the Mediterranean and Middle East Communication Squadron
Air Headquarters Greece Communication Flight RAF	January 1945	RAF Hassani, Greece	11 January 1947	RAF Hassani	Became the Royal Air Force Delegation (Greece) Communication Flight
Air Headquarters India Communication Flight RAF	16 August 1939	RAF Lahore	21 January 1942	RAF Willingdon	Disbanded
Air Headquarters Iraq Communication Flight RAF	1 March 1946	RAF Habbaniya, Iraq	5 August 1954	RAF Habbaniya	Became the Iraq Communication Flight
Air Headquarters Italy Communication Flight RAF	15 August 1946	RAF Udine, Italy	27 September 1947	RAF Udine	Disbanded
Air Headquarters Malta Communication Flight RAF	1 March 1944	RAF Hal Far, Malta	31 May 1946	RAF Luqa	Became the Malta Communications and Target Towing Squadron
Air Headquarters Middle East Communication Flight RAF	February 1942	Eqypt	1942	Unknown	
Allied Expeditionary Air Force Communication Flight RAF	13 December 1943	RAF Heston	6 April 1944	RAF Heston	Became the Allied Expeditionary Air Force Communication Squadron
Andover Communication Flight RAF	28 March 1927	RAF Andover	10 September 1938	RAF Andover	Became the Staff College Station Flight
Army Co-Operation Command Communication Flight RAF	1 December 1940	RAF White Waltham	31 May 1943	RAF White Waltham	Became the 2nd Tactical Air Force Communication Flight
Austria Commission Flight RAF	15 August 1946	RAF Klagenfurt	1 November 1947	RAF Klagenfurt	Disbanded
Balkan Air Force Communication Flight RAF	7 June 1944	RAF Bari	16 July 1945	RAF Bari	Disbanded
Berlin Air Command (RAF) Communication Flight RAF	24 May 1945	RAF Gatow	1 August 1945	B.58 Melsbroek	Became British Air Command Berlin Communication Flight RAF
Bomber Command Communication Flight RAF	1942	RAF Halton	1956	RAF Halton	Became Bomber Command Communication Squadron.
British Air Command Berlin Communication Flight RAF	1 August 1945	RAF Gatow	28 February	RAF Gatow	Disbanded
Civil Aircraft Flight, National Air Communications RAF	September 1939	RAF Doncaster	1 May 1940	RAF Doncaster	Became No. 271 Squadron RAF
Coastal Command Communication Flight RAF	May 1952	RAF Bovingdon	30 June 1963	RAF Bovingdon	Disbanded into Bomber/Fighter/Coastal Communication Squadron RAF
Communication Flight, Aden RAF	1 April 1942	RAF Khormaksar	21 March 1943	RAF Khormaksar	Became HQ British Forces Aden Communications Flight RAF
Communication Flight, Air Headquarters New Delhi RAF	November 1930	RAF Willingdon	1 April 1942	RAF Willingdon	Became No. 224 Group Communication Flight
Communication Flight, Air Headquarters Western Desert RAF	9 October 1941	RAF Ma'aten Bagush	27 April 1942	RAF Ma'aten Bagush	Became Communication Unit, Western Desert
Communication Flight, Aldermaston RAF					
Communication Flight, Dar es Salaam (Air Defence Unit, Tanganyika) RAF					
Communication Flight, Dum Dum RAF					
Communication Flight, Eastleigh RAF					
Communication Flight, GHQ Royal Flying Corps, France RAF					
Communication Flight, Heliopolis RAF					
Communication Flight, Iraq RAF					
Communication Flight, Iraq and Persia RAF					
Communication Flight, Khartoum RAF (see 117 Squadron)					
Communication Flight, Lydda RAF					
Communication Flight, Malta RAF	1 February 1943	RAF Hal Far	1 March 1943	RAF Hal Far	Disbanded into Malta Air Sea Rescue & Communication Flight
Communication Flight, Nicosia RAF					
Communication Flight, Ramleh RAF					
Communication Flight, Takoradi RAF					
Desert Air Force Communication Flight RAF	20 August 1943 1 September 1945	RAF Francesco RAF Feletto Umbero	October 1945 30 June 1946	RAF Udine RAF Campoformido	Disbanded Merged with AHQ Italy Communication Squadron
Eastleigh Communication Flight RAF	15 September 1951	RAF Eastleigh, Africa	June 1953	RAF Eastleigh	Previously East Africa Communication Squadron
Flying Training Command Communication Flight RAF	27 May 1940	RAF White Waltham	31 March 1953	RAF White Waltham	Merged into Home Command Communication Flight
Free French Communication Flight RAF	2 June 1941	RAF Heliopolis	June 1942	Heliopolis	Controlled by No. 267 Squadron
HQ British Forces Aden Communications Flight RAF	21 March 1943 January 1946	RAF Khormaksar	1 January 1944 1 December 1951	RAF Khormaksar	Became Aden Communication Unit Became Aden Communication Squadron
Headquarters Combat Cargo Task Force Communication Flight RAF	5 February 1945	RAF Comilla	27 February 1945	RAF Comilla	Became No. 232 Group Communication Flight
HQ Far East Communication Flight RAF	April 1940	RAF Seletar	September 1940	RAF Seletar	
HQ Middle East Air Force Flight RAF	15 March 1950	RAF Ismailia	1 December 1954	RAF Nicosia	Became HQ Middle East Air Force Communication Squadron
Headquarters Rhodesian Air Training Wing Communication Flight RAF	1 December 1946	RAF Kumalo	10 May 1948	RAF Kumalo	Became Rhodesian Air Training Group Communication Squadron
Headquarters RAF Northern Ireland Communication Flight RAF	October 1940	RAF Sydenham	31 March 1950	RAF Aldergrove	
Helicopter Communications Flight RAF	1 December 1960	RAF South Cerney	31 October 1961	RAF Gutersloh	
Home Communication Flight RAF	1 February 1927	RAF Northolt	10 July 1933	RAF Hendon	Absorbed into No. 24 Squadron
Inland Area Communications Flight RAF	1 April 1920	RAF Northolt	1 February 1927	RAF Northolt	
Iraq Communication Flight RAF	5 August 1954	RAF Habbaniya	23 June 1955	RAF Habbaniya	Became AHQ Levant Communications Flight
Kuala Lumpur Communication Flight RAF	1 August 1952	RAF Kuala Lumpur	15 February 1954	RAF Kuala Lumpur	Disbanded into No. 267 Squadron
Light Communication Trial Flight RAF	15 January 1948	RAF Ismailia	1 July 1949	RAF Ismailia	
Maintenance Command Communication Flight RAF	Unk	RAF Andover	1 August 1949	RAF Andover	Became Maintenance Command Communication Squadron
Malta Air Sea Rescue & Communication Flight RAF	1 March 1943	RAF Hal Far	1 March 1944	RAF Hal Far	Became Malta Communications Flight
Malta Communications Flight RAF	1 August 1963	RAF Ta Kali	30 June 1968	RAF Luqa	
Mediterranean Allied Coastal Air Forces Communication Flight RAF	1 January 1944	RAF Blida	1 June 1945	RAF Marcianise	Disbanded into Mediterranean and Middle East Communication Flight
Mediterranean Allied Tactical Air Forces Communication Flight RAF	1 January 1944	RAF Bari	7 January 1944	RAF Bari	Became Mediterranean Allied Tactical Air Force Communication Flight RAF
Mediterranean Allied Tactical Air Force Communication Flight RAF	7 January 1944	RAF Bari	6 July 1945	RAF Peretola	
Mediterranean Tactical Air Forces Communication Flight RAF	1 January 1944	RAF Bari	October 1944	RAF Pomigliano	
Middle East Air Force Communication Flight RAF	1 December 1949	RAF Ismailia	15 March 1950	RAF Ismailia	Became HQ Middle East Air Force Flight
Middle East Air Force Special Communication Flight RAF	1 September 1952	RAF Fayid	1 December 1954	RAF Fayid	Merged with MEAF Communications Flight, Nicosia to become HQ MEAF Communication Squadron
Middle East Command Communication Flight RAF	15 June 1965	RAF Khormaksar	1 September 1967	RAF Khormaksar	Disbanded
Northwest African Air Forces Communication Flight RAF	1 February 1943	RAF Bone	1 January 1944	RAF El Aouina	Disbanded into Mediterranean and Middle East Communication Squadron
Northwest African Coastal Air Force Communication Flight RAF	17 February 1943	RAF Maison Blanche	1 January 1944	RAF Maison Blanche	Became Mediterranean Allied Coastal Air Forces Communication Flight RAF
Northwest African Tactical Air Force Communication Flight RAF	November 1943	RAF Bari	1 January 1944	RAF Bari	Became Mediterranean Allied Tactical Air Forces Communication Flight RAF
Overseas Staff College Communication Flight RAF	September 1945	RAF Larnaca		RAF Ramat David	Became RAF Staff College (Overseas) Communication Flight
Reserve Command Communication Flight RAF	1 February 1939 10 September 1946	RAF Hendon RAF White Waltham	27 May 1940 1 August 1950	RAF White Waltham	Became the Home Command Communication Squadron
Royal Air Force Communication Flight	17 December 1947	RAF Palam	30 June 1948	RAF Mauripur	Disbanded. Operated Dakota's and York's
Royal Air Force Mission to Belgium Communication Flight RAF	Unk	Unk	Unk	Unk	
Royal Air Force Mission to Denmark Communication Flight RAF	15 July 1945	RAF Kastrup	26 October 1947	RAF Kastrup	
Royal Air Force Delegation (France) Communication Flight RAF	26 August 1946	RAF Buckeburg	15 November 1947	RAF Toussus-Le-Noble	
Royal Air Force Delegation (Greece) Communication Flight RAF	11 January 1947	RAF Hassani	30 April 1952	RAF Ellenikon	NOTE: Hassani renamed to Ellenikon on 1 August 1949
RAF Far East Communication Flight	15 January 1947	RAF Changi	15 October 1947	RAF Changi	Became Far East Communication Squadron
Royal Air Force Staff College Communication Flight RAF	24 June 1946	RAF White Waltham	10 September 1946	RAF White Waltham	Became RAF Staff College Flight
Royal Air Force Staff College (Overseas) Communication Flight RAF	16 July 1945	RAF Ramat David	5 November 1946	RAF Lydda	
Royal Hellenic Air Force Communication Flight RAF	1 March 1945	RAF Maleme	10 September 1946	RAF Hassani	
South Eastern Area Communication Flight RAF	29 April 1919	RAF Northolt	1 April 1920	RAF Northolt	Became Inland Area Communications Flight
Southern Rhodesia Communications Flight RAF	1943	RAF Belvedere	Unk	Unk	
Technical Training Command Communication Flight RAF	27 May 1940	RAF White Waltham	1 April 1964	RAF Wyton	
Training Command Communication Flight RAF	September 1939	RAF Ternhill	27 May 1940	RAF White Waltham	
Transport Command Communication Flight RAF	8 April 1944	RAF Hendon	1959	RAF Hendon	Became Transport Command Communication Squadron
Wessex Bombing Area Communication Flight RAF	12 April 1926	RAF Andover	28 March 1927	RAF Andover	Disbanded into Andover Communication Flight
