= Bückeburg Air Base =

German Army air base at Bückeburg

Bückeburg Air Base Heeresflugplatz Bückeburg
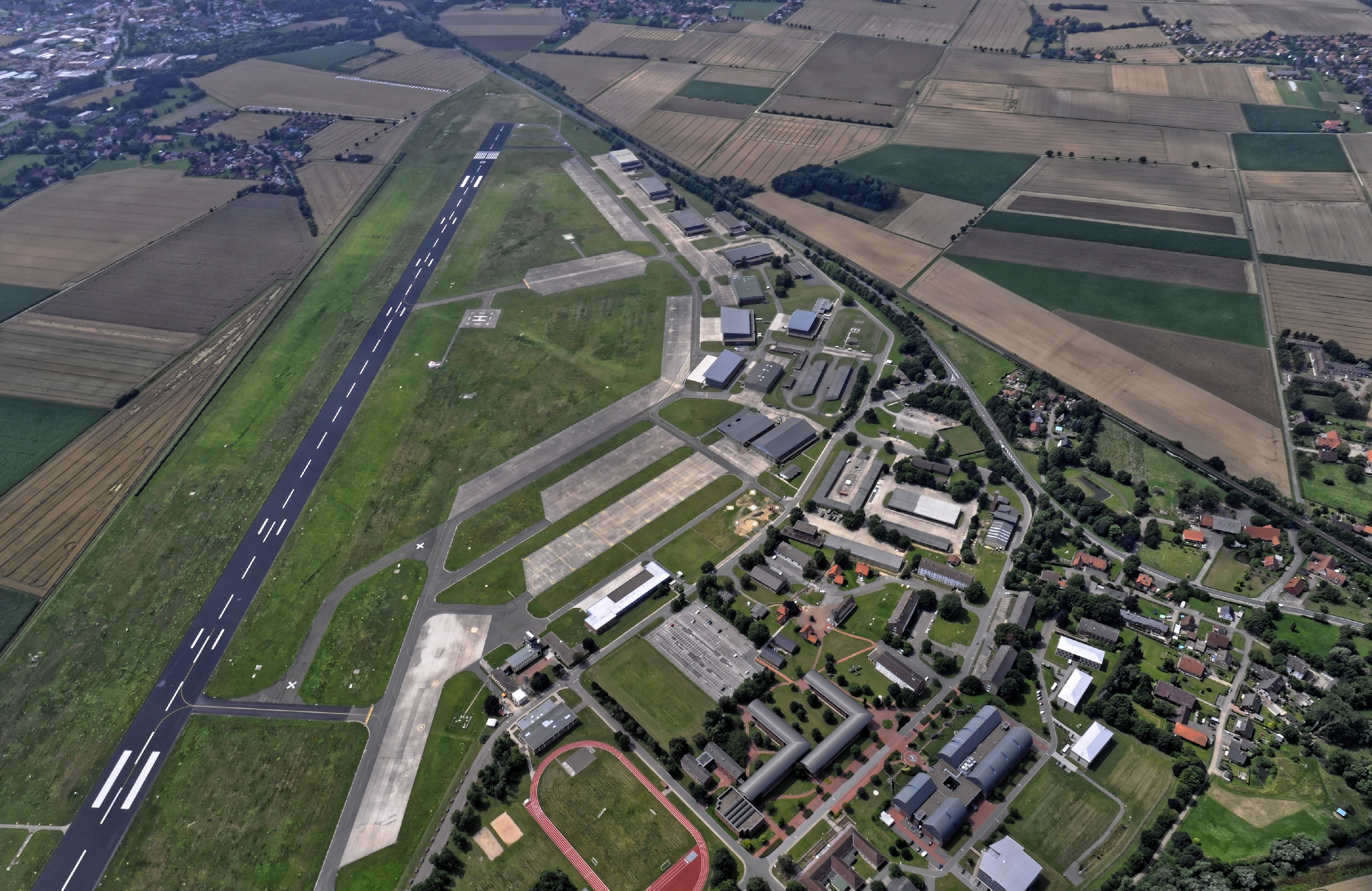
- IATA: none; ICAO: ETHB

Summary
- Airport type: Military
- Owner: Federal Ministry of Defence
- Operator: German Army
- Location: Bückeburg
- Built: 1946
- In use: 1946 - present
- Commander: Brigadier General Richard Bolz
- Occupants: German Army Aviators Corps
- Elevation AMSL: 230 ft / 70 m
- Coordinates: 52°15′42″N 009°04′55″E

Map
- Location of Bückeburg Air Base

Runways
Direction	Length		Surface
Direction	m	ft	Surface
08/26	1,832	6,011	Asphalt

Bückeburg Air Base (German: Heeresflugplatz Bückeburg, ICAO: ETHB) is a German Army base located northeast of the city of Bückeburg, Lower Saxony, Germany.

== British use ==
The airfield was built in 1946 as a RAF Station, RAF Bückeburg, serving the headquarters of the Royal Air Force Germany in Bad Eilsen. It complemented the nearby headquarters of the British Army of the Rhine in Bad Oeynhausen. During the Berlin Airlift it was one of the numerous air fields from where supply flights to Berlin were carried out. After the building of the British Forces' Joint Headquarters (JHQ) at Rheindahlen in 1954, the RAF closed the airfield at the end of the 1950s.

Units

- No. 2 Squadron RAF from 29 June 1950 with Supermarine Spitfires and Gloster Meteors
- No. 541 Squadron RAF operating Gloster Meteor PR.10s
- 2nd Tactical Air Force Communication Wing RAF
- 2nd Tactical Air Force Communication Squadron RAF
- British Air Forces of Occupation Communication Squadron RAF

== German use ==
With the foundation of the Bundeswehr in 1955, a decision was made that every branch of the Bundeswehr should have their own helicopter units, operating within the framework of the tasks designated to each branch of the armed forces. Thus, the German Army Aviation Corps was founded. The first training school, of this newly established branch of the German Army, the School of Army Aviation, was established in 1959 in Mendig but moved to its current location in Bückeburg in January 1960 and has been there ever since. Its first commanding office was Colonel Kuno Ebeling.

Bückeburg Air Base is used by the German Army's School of Army Aviation as one of the bases for the practical instruction of its flying and non-flying personnel. Basic flying training of helicopter pilots of other components of the German Armed Forces also takes place at Bückeburg Air Base.

Apart from the actual flight training, modern high-end flight simulators are extensively used during the training of future military helicopter pilots.

Approximately 70 helicopters are permanently based at the airfield, 30 of which are used on a daily base for training. Initial training begins with the Eurocopter EC 135. During the second stage, prospective pilots are then instructed in flying the Bell UH-1D, Bölkow Bo 105, medium transport helicopters NH-90 and Sikorsky CH-53G/GS. Flying instruction on the helicopters of the type Bell UH-1D, now being phased out, and Bölkow Bo 105, takes place at Celle Air Base.

The tasks of Army Aviators Test Squadron 910 consist not only of trials of new types of helicopters but also of tactical and logistical research aiming at improving and developing the efficiency and concepts under which the German Army Aviators Corps are supposed to fulfil their manifolds tasks.

The following units are stationed at Bückeburg Air Base:

Name of unit	Insignia
Staff HQ	
Instruction Group A (flying instruction)	
Army Aviators Test Squadron 910	
Research And Development Group	
Technical Maintenance Department	

In October 2011 the German Federal Ministry of Defence announced a reorganisation/reduction of the German Armed Forces. As a consequence, all activities of German Army Aviation School will be concentrated at Bückeburg Air Base and the school itself will be renamed International Helicopter Training Centre. The outpost at Celle Air Base will be dissolved.

== See also ==
- German Army Aviators Corps
- History of the German Army Aviators Corps
- German Army
- Royal Air Force Germany
