= No. 25 Group RAF =

Former Royal Air Force flying training group

No. 25 (Flying Training) Group RAF ~~No. 25 (Armament) Group RAF~~ ~~No. 25 (Operations) Group RAF~~
- Royal Air Force Ensign
- Active: 12 August 1918 - 12 June 1919; 1 December 1937 - 15 April 1948; 20 March 1951 - 1 June 1968
- Country: United Kingdom
- Branch: Royal Air Force
- Type: Royal Air Force group
- Role: Military aviation training
- Part of: RAF Training Command; RAF Flying Training Command
- Last HQ: RAF White Waltham
- Motto(s): Instate

No. 25 Group RAF is a former Royal Air Force group. It was initially active between 1918 and 1919. It reformed during 1937, remaining active throughout the Second World War, disbanding again in 1948. It reformed a second time during 1951 and disbanded for a third time in 1968.

== History ==
=== First World War ===
No. 25 (Operations) Group formed on 12 August 1918 at Luce Bay, within North Western Area. It had No. 258 Squadron RAF and No. 273 Squadron RAF under its operational control, along with the Airship Stations at Luce Bay and Larne. The group disbanded on 12 June 1919.

=== Second World War ===
It reformed, known as No. 25 (Armament) Group RAF, on 1 December 1937 at RAF Eastchurch, within RAF Training Command, by renaming the Armament Group. On 28 June 1939 the HQ relocated to RAF Brize Norton. Six months later on 31 January 1940, it moved again, to Buntingsdale Hall, Market Drayton in Shropshire. On 27 May 1940, with the split of RAF Training Command, the group moved into RAF Flying Training Command. It had responsibility for all the armament training schools including No. 1 Air Armament School RAF, at RAF Manby, and the Central Gunnery School RAF, at RAF Sutton Bridge. On 7 July 1942, the Air Gunners Schools and the (Observers) Advanced Flying Units for Northern England, were moved into No. 29 Group RAF. The responsibility for the Air Gunners Schools and the (Observers) Advanced Flying Units in the Midlands and Wales, along with No. 1 Air Armament School RAF, the Central Gunnery School RAF and the Central Navigation School RAF remained within No. 25 Group. After the Second World War, on 26 April 1947, the group HQ moved to St Vincents Hall, Grantham, in Lincolnshire, however, it eventually disbanded on 15 April 1948.

=== Cold War ===
On 20 March 1951 it reformed as No. 25 (Flying Training) Group RAF at RAF Manby. It was tasked with administering the Flying Refresher Schools and the Advanced Flying Schools, using Jet aircraft. On 28 January 1961 the Group HQ moved to RAF White Waltham. The group was operational for a further seven years, before eventually disbanding on 1 June 1968, and was absorbed into No. 22 Group RAF.

== Structure ==
November 1939 HQ at RAF Brize Norton

- RAF Manby
  - No. 1 Air Armament School RAF
- RAF Pembrey
  - No. 2 Air Armament School RAF
- RAF Aldergrove
  - No. 3 Air Observers School RAF
- RAF West Freugh
  - No. 4 Air Observers School RAF
- RAF Jurby
  - No. 5 Air Observers School RAF
- RAF Porthcawl
  - No. 7 Air Observers School RAF
- RAF Evanton
  - No. 8 Air Observers School RAF
- RAF Penrhos
  - No. 9 Air Observers School RAF
- RAF Warmwell
  - No. 10 Air Observers School RAF

May 1941 HQ at Buntingsdale Hall, Market Drayton

- RAF Dumfries
  - No. 10 Bombing and Gunnery School RAF
- RAF Evanton
  - No. 8 Bombing and Gunnery School RAF
- RAF Exeter
  - Gunnery Research Unit RAF
  - Det of Royal Aircraft Establishment
- RAF Jurby
  - No. 5 Bombing and Gunnery School RAF
- RAF Manby
  - No. 1 Air Armament School RAF
- RAF Millom
  - No. 2 Bombing and Gunnery School RAF
- RAF Penrhos
  - No. 9 Bombing and Gunnery School RAF
- RAF Stormy Down
  - No. 7 Bombing and Gunnery School RAF
- RAF Warmwell
  - Central Gunnery School RAF
- RAF West Freugh
  - No. 4 Bombing and Gunnery School RAF

April 1942 HQ at Buntingsdale Hall, Market Drayton

- RAF Barrow
  - No. 10 Air Gunners School RAF
- RAF Bobbington
  - No. 3 Air Observers School RAF
- RAF Chelveston
  - Central Gunnery School RAF
- RAF Dalcross
  - No. 2 Air Gunners School RAF
- RAF Dumfries
  - No. 10 Air Observers School RAF
- RAF Evanton
  - No. 8 Air Gunnery School RAF
- RAF Exeter
  - Gunnery Research School RAF
- RAF Jurby
  - No. 5 Air Observers School RAF
- RAF Llandwrog
  - No. 9 Air Gunners School RAF
- RAF Manby
  - No. 1 Air Armament School RAF
- RAF Millom
  - No. 2 Air Observers School RAF
- RAF Pembrey
  - No. 1 Air Gunners School RAF
- RAF Penrhos
  - No. 9 Air Observers School RAF
- RAF Stormy Down
  - No. 7 Air Gunners School RAF
- RAF West Freugh
  - No. 4 Air Observers School RAF
- RAF Wigtown
  - No. 1 Air Observers School RAF

April 1943 HQ at Buntingsdale Hall, Market Drayton

- RAF Bobbington
  - No. 3 (Observers) Advanced Flying Unit RAF
- RAF Cranage
  - Central Navigation School RAF
- RAF Exeter
  - Gunnery Research Unit RAF
- RAF Manby
  - No. 1 Air Armament School RAF
- RAF Mona
  - No. 3 Air Gunners School RAF
- RAF Pembrey
  - No. 1 Air Gunners School RAF
- RAF Penrhos
  - No. 9 (Observers) Advanced Flying Unit RAF
- RAF Staverton
  - No. 6 Air Observers School RAF
- RAF Stormy Down
  - No. 7 Air Gunners School RAF
- RAF Sutton Bridge
  - Central Gunnery School RAF

July 1944 HQ at Buntingsdale Hall, Market Drayton

- RAF Barrow
  - No. 10 Air Gunners School RAF
- RAF Blackpool
  - School of Air Sea Rescue RAF
- RAF Cark
  - Staff Pilots Training Unit RAF
- RAF Catfoss
  - Central Gunnery School RAF
- RAF Halfpenny Green
  - No. 3 (Observers) Advanced Flying Unit RAF
  - No. 1545 (Beam Approach Training) Flight RAF
- RAF Manby
  - No. 1 Air Armament School RAF
- RAF Millom
  - No. 2 (Observers) Advanced Flying Unit RAF
- RAF Mona
  - No. 8 (Observers) Advanced Flying Unit RAF
- RAF Pembrey
  - No. 8 (Observers) Advanced Flying Unit RAF
  - No. 1 Air Gunners School RAF
- RAF Penrhos
  - No. 9 (Observers) Advanced Flying Unit RAF
- RAF Staverton
  - No. 6 (Observers) Advanced Flying Unit RAF
- RAF Stormy Down
  - No. 7 Air Gunners School RAF

July 1945 HQ at Buntingsdale Hall, Market Drayton

- RAF Barrow
  - No. 10 Air Gunners School RAF
- RAF Cark
  - Staff Pilots Training Unit RAF
- RAF Catfoss
  - Central Gunnery School RAF
- RAF Halfpenny Green
  - No. 3 (Observers) Advanced Flying Unit RAF
- RAF Manby
  - Empire Air Armament School RAF
- RAF Penrhos
  - No. 2 Air Crew Holding Unit RAF
- RAF Shawbury
  - Empire Air Navigation School RAF

April 1962 HQ at RAF White Waltham

- Brough Aerodrome
  - Hull University Air Squadron
- Cambridge City Airport
  - Cambridge University Air Squadron
- Aberdeen Airport (Dyce)
  - Aberdeen University Air Squadron
- RAF Exeter
  - No. 3/4 Civilian Anti-Aircraft Co-operation Unit RAF
- RAF Hullavington
  - No. 2 Air Navigation School RAF
- RAF Leuchars
  - St Andrews University Air Squadron
- Perth Airport
  - Glasgow University Air Squadron
- RAF Shawbury
  - Birmingham University Air Squadron
- RAF South Cerney
  - No. 1 Initial Training School RAF
- RAF Stradishall
  - No. 1 Air Navigation School RAF
- RAF Sydenham
  - Queens University Air Squadron
- RAF Topcliffe
  - No. 1 Air Electronics School RAF
- RAF Turnhouse
  - Edinburgh University Air Squadron
- RAF White Waltham
  - London University Air Squadron

== Headquarters ==
No. 25 Group had various HQ during its three active periods:

- Luce Bay - between 1918 and 1919
- RAF Eastchurch - reformed in December 1937
- RAF Brize Norton - from June 1939
- Buntingsdale Hall - from January 1940
- St Vincents Hall - from April 1947 until April 1948
- RAF Manby - reformed in March 1951
- RAF White Waltham - from January 1961 until June 1968

== Air Officers Commanding ==
Note: The ranks shown are the ranks held at the time of holding the appointment of Air Officer Commanding, No. 25 Group Royal Air Force.

No. 25 Group commanding officers
Rank	name	from
	?	June 1918
Disbanded		1920
Air Commodore	Lawrence Pattinson	February 1934
Air Commodore	Guy Garrod	February 1937
Air Commodore	George Bentley Dacre	1938
Air Vice-Marshal	Henry Cave-Browne-Cave	August 1938
Air Commodore	Hugh Champion de Crespigny	February 1939
Air Commodore	Edward Derek Davis	January 1942
Air Commodore	Christopher Neil Hope Bilney	December 1945
Air Commodore	Gordon Herbert Vasse	1947 - 48
Disbanded		April 1948
Air Vice-Marshal	Richard Jordan	March 1951
Air Vice-Marshal	Hugh Hamilton Brookes	February 1953
Air Vice-Marshal	Hugh Constantine	August 1954
Air Vice-Marshal	Hugh Hamilton Brookes	April 1956
Air Vice-Marshal	John Forde Hobler	October 1958
Air Vice-Marshal	Herbert James Kirkpatrick	February 1961
Air Vice-Marshal	Paul Holder	January 1963
Air Vice-Marshal	Richard Ian Jones	October 1964
Air Vice-Marshal	Graham Reese Magill	May 1967
