= Staverton =

Staverton as a place name may refer to:

- Staverton, Devon, England
- Staverton, Gloucestershire, England
  - can refer to the nearby Gloucestershire Airport
- Staverton, Northamptonshire, England
- Staverton, Tasmania, Australia
- Staverton, Wiltshire, England
- Staverton Road, North Oxford, England
