= RAF Cark =

Former RAF airfield in Lancashire, England

RAF Cark
- Near Cark, Lancashire in England

Site information
- Type: Royal Air Force Station
- Owner: Air Ministry
- Operator: Royal Air Force
- Controlled by: RAF Fighter Command; RAF Flying Training Command

Location
- Shown within Cumbria RAF Cark (Cumbria) RAF Cark (the United Kingdom)
- Coordinates: 54°09′45″N 002°57′30″W

Site history
- Built: 1941
- In use: 1941 - 1945
- Battles/wars: European theatre of World War II

Airfield information
- Elevation: 5 metres (16 ft) AMSL
Runways
Direction	Length and surface
06/24	1,040 metres (3,412 ft) Concrete/tarmac
12/30	1,040 metres (3,412 ft) concrete/tarmac
17/35	1,110 metres (3,642 ft) concrete/tarmac
- Other airfield facilities: Operational dates.

Royal Air Force Cark or more simply RAF Cark is a former Royal Air Force station in the county of Cumbria (formerly Lancashire) which was operational between 1941 and 1945. It was built near the villages of Cark and Flookburgh on the Cartmel Peninsula which today forms part of Cumbria.

== History ==
=== Construction ===
RAF Cark was constructed on a site which had been considered for a possible airship factory in 1916. Preparation work had been undertaken, however the project was cancelled the following year.

=== RAF Fighter Command ===
Opening in 1941, the station was designed primarily to operate as a fighter station under the control of No.9 Group, RAF Fighter Command, in order to afford protection to the industrialised areas of northwest England.

The airfield featured a dispersal site on the east side which consisted of six pens each able to accommodate two aircraft. On the northwest side of the airfield a Bellman Hangar was built on the technical site and in time this was supplemented by the addition of fourteen blister type hangars.

=== RAF Flying Training Command ===
On 17 March 1942, RAF Cark was taken over by RAF Flying Training Command. On the same day, a new unit, the Staff Pilot Training Unit, was created under the command of No. 25 Group with aircraft such as Hawker Hurricanes, Miles Martinets and latterly Supermarine Spitfires. Avro Ansons were also employed at the Station in addition to which a de Havilland Tiger Moth was operated as a communication aircraft between the RAF Cark and RAF Millom. RAF Cark was also used for Anti Aircraft gunnery training.

Initially parented by RAF Millom, RAF Cark became a self reliant station during 1942.

The remit of the Staff Pilot Training Unit was to train pilots in both day and night flying following which the pilots would be posted to Air Observer Schools. The Staff Pilot Training Unit left in November 1942, but returned the following March. In 1944 gliders of the requisitioned Lakes Gliding Club were moved from RAF Walney and formed No. 188 Gliding School, Air Training Corps.

During its operational life RAF Cark played host to detachments from several squadrons on anti aircraft co-operational duties.

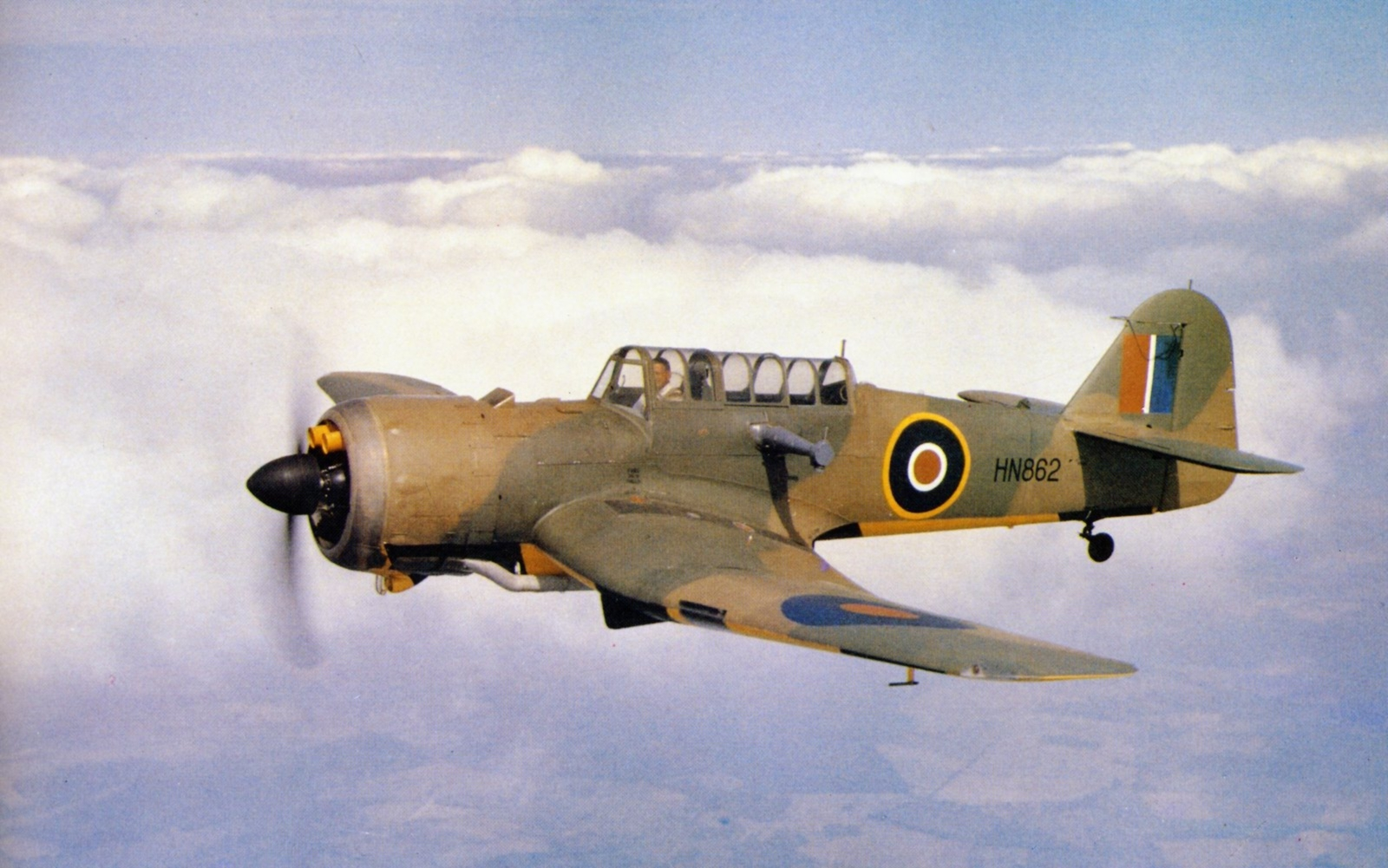
Miles M.25 Martinet TT MkI in flight

== Units ==
During the course of the operation of the station, the following units were at sometime based at RAF Cark:

03/41 to 11/42, Staff Pilot Training Unit RAF.

01/42 to 10/42, No. 1 Anti-Aircraft Co-operation Unit RAF ('R'.Flt).

01/42 to 11/42, No. 1 Anti-Aircraft Co-operation Unit RAF ('F'.Flt).

03/42 to 03/43, No. 6 Anti-Aircraft Co-operation Unit RAF

11/42 to 12/43, No. 1614 (Anti-Aircraft Co-operation) Flight RAF.

11/42 to --/--, No. 289 Squadron RAF (detachment) with Hawker Hurricanes.

03/43 to 12/45, Staff Pilot Training Unit.

03/43 to 11/44, No. 650 Squadron RAF (detachment) with Miles Martinets.

04/44 to 05/44, No. 290 Squadron RAF (detachment) with Supermarine Spitfires

11/44 to --/--, 650 Sqn (detachment) with Hawker Hurricanes.

10/45 to 12/45, Pilot-Navigation Instructors Course RAF

--/44 to 05/47, No. 188 Gliding School, Air Training Corps.

== Closure ==
Following the cessation of hostilities in 1945 operations at RAF Cark were run down with the station being placed on care and maintenance. The last residents to leave were No. 188 Gliding School who transferred to RAF Walney in May 1947 following which the Station closed.

== Subsequent use ==
RAF Cark was sold off by the Air Ministry and was subsequently used as a venue for gliding. Today, Cark Airfield is the home of the North West Parachute Centre.

== See also ==
- List of former Royal Air Force stations
