= Fred Sutherland =

Fred Sutherland may refer to:

- Fred Sutherland (RCAF airman) (1923 - 2019), original member of No. 617 Squadron RAF who participated on Operation Chastise and Operation Garlic
- Fred Sutherland (Canadian Air Force general) (born 1942), retired air force general; Commander, Air Command and Vice Chief of the Defence Staff
