= Cavendish Dock =

Docks in Barrow-in-Furness, England

Coordinates: 54.1045°N 3.2058°W

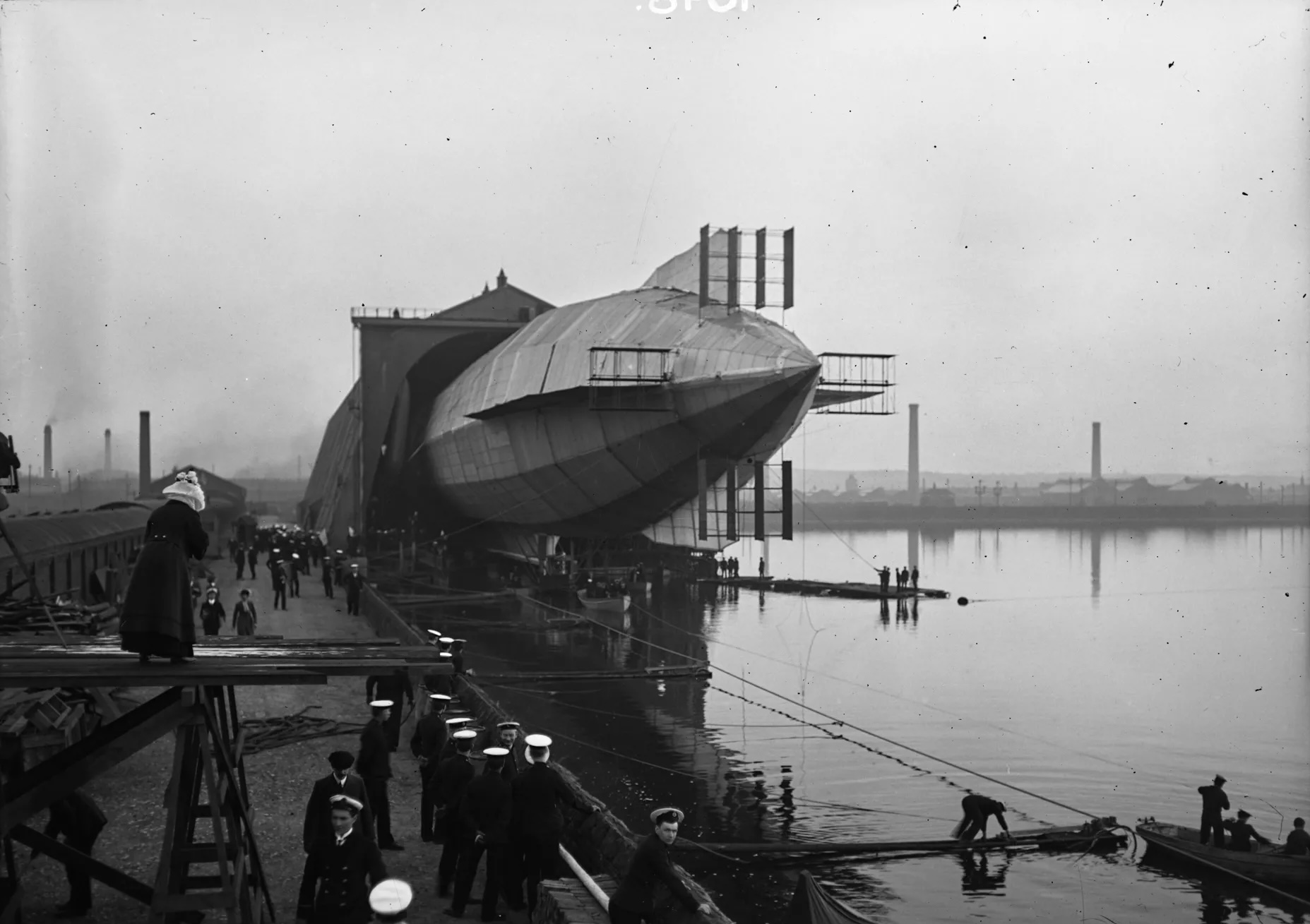
His Majesty's Airship No. 1 leaving the construction shed in Cavendish Dock in 1911

Cavendish Dock is one of the four docks which make up the Royal Port of Barrow in Barrow-in-Furness, England. Covering some 591,000 square metres (146 acres) it is roughly the size of Barrow's other three docks combined. It is named after William Cavendish, 7th Duke of Devonshire who invested heavily in the industrial growth of Barrow. Cavendish Dock is owned by Associated British Ports, however it is now entirely enclosed serving as a reservoir. It is also a popular fishing destination due to the diverse and unique wildlife found as a result of the control of water in and out the dock. Fishing is controlled by Barrow Angling Association and memberships are required to fish the water.

During the early 20th century, Cavendish Dock was home to an airship construction facility before the works were transferred to nearby Barrow/Walney Island Airport.
