= RAF Bodorgan =

Former Royal Air Force station on Isle of Anglesey, Wales

RAF Bodorgan No. 15 SLG ~~RAF Aberffraw~~
- Bodorgan, Isle of Anglesey in Wales

Site information
- Type: Satellite Landing Ground
- Owner: Air Ministry
- Operator: Royal Air Force
- Controlled by: RAF Maintenance Command

Location
- Shown within Anglesey, Wales RAF Bodorgan (the United Kingdom)
- Coordinates: 53°11′13″N 4°25′28″W

Site history
- Built: 1940
- In use: 1940-1946
- Battles/wars: European theatre of World War II

Airfield information
Runways
Direction	Length and surface
NNE/SSQ	1,000 yards (914 m) Grass
E/W	1,000 yards (914 m) Grass
WSW/ENE	960 yards (878 m) Grass

Royal Air Force Bodorgan, or more simply RAF Bodorgan, is a former Royal Air Force satellite airfield located near to Bodorgan Hall on the Isle of Anglesey, Wales. The airfield was opened as RAF Aberffraw on 1 September 1940. Its name was changed to Bodorgan on 15 May 1941, and it was closed on 30 September 1945.

== History ==
The airfield was built on land requisitioned from the Meyrick estate of Bodorgan. Work started on the airfield in 1940, in response to the beginning of the second world war. The site was originally called RAF Aberffraw, but was later changed to RAF Bodorgan. The airfield was initially built for the purpose of being an Anti-Aircraft Co-operation Unit, and was later used as a Satellite Landing Ground.

Bodorgan initially had one Blister hangar, with two Bellman hangars added later. Accommodation for personnel was initially in tents, which were replaced by Nissen and Maycrete huts, for accommodation, workshops and technical functions. The hangars were dismantled soon after the airfield closed, but some of the huts remain at the site.

In 1942 the fields to the east of the airfield were used for the camouflaged storage of up to thirty Vickers Wellington medium bomber aircraft.

The airfield closed in 1945, and the land returned back to being used for agriculture. As of 2020, some of the former RAF buildings remained standing.

== Based units ==
The following units were here at some point:

- ‘J’ Flight of No. 1 Anti-Aircraft Co-operation Unit RAF (1 AACU) (September 1940 - November 1942) became No. 1606 (Anti-Aircraft Co-operation) Flight RAF (November 1942 - April 1945)
- ‘Z’ Flight, 1 AACU (October 1940 - November 1942) became No. 1620 (Anti-Aircraft Co-operation) Flight RAF (November 1942 - December 1943)
- Detachment of No. 6 Anti-Aircraft Co-operation Unit RAF (March 1941 - February 1942)
- Detachment of No. 8 Anti-Aircraft Co-operation Unit RAF (May - November 1943)
- No. 48 Maintenance Unit RAF (April 1941 - November 1944)
- Detachment of No. 577 Squadron RAF
- No. 650 Squadron RAF (November 1944 - June 1945)

== See also ==
- List of Royal Air Force Satellite Landing Grounds
