= Cark =

Village in Cumbria, England

Coordinates: 54.180°N 2.976°W

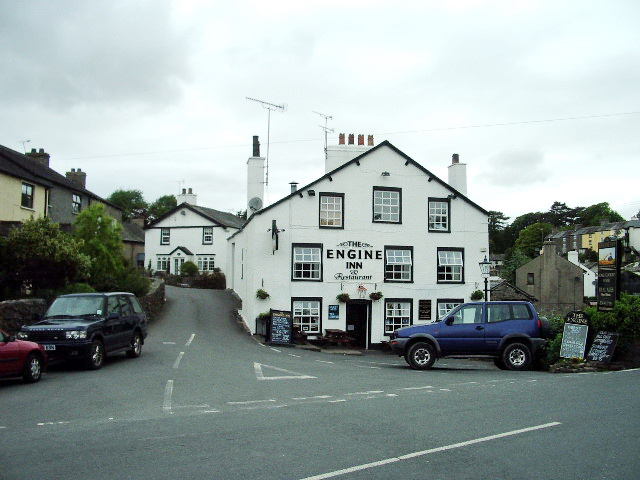
- The Engine Inn and Restaurant, Cark

- Location in South Lakeland Location within Cumbria
- OS grid reference: SD363765
- Civil parish: Lower Holker
- Unitary authority: Westmorland and Furness
- Ceremonial county: Cumbria
- Region: North West
- Country: England
- Sovereign state: United Kingdom
- Post town: GRANGE-OVER-SANDS
- Postcode district: LA11
- Dialling code: 015395
- Police: Cumbria
- Fire: Cumbria
- Ambulance: North West
- UK Parliament: Westmorland and Lonsdale

Cark (sometimes Cark in Cartmel) is a village in Cumbria, England. It lies on the B5278 road to Haverthwaite (and to the A590 road) and is 1/2 mile (0.80 km) north of Flookburgh, 2 miles (3.2 km) southwest of Cartmel, and 3 miles (5 km) west of Grange-over-Sands.

== History ==
It is in the historic county of Lancashire. The village is served by the Cark and Cartmel railway station on the Furness Line between Barrow-in-Furness and Lancaster.

The village used to have a water-powered cotton mill between 1784 and c1815.

Cark is ½ mile south of Holker Hall owned by Lord and Lady Cavendish.

Royal Air Force Station Cark was constructed near Flookburgh in late 1940. It was used by training and anti-aircraft co-operation units from March 1941 until closure in December 1945. After many years of disuse, it was reopened for civilian use and is the location of the North West Parachute Centre.

== Notable people ==
- Christopher Rawlinson (1677–1733) of Carke Hall in Cartmel, antiquary
- Edith Allonby (1875-1905), writer and teacher

== See also ==
- Listed buildings in Lower Holker
