= No. 650 Squadron RAF =

Defunct flying squadron of the Royal Air Force

- Active: 1 December 1943 – 26 June 1945
- Country: United Kingdom
- Branch: Royal Air Force
- Role: anti aircraft co-operation

Insignia
- Squadron Codes: T7 (Dec 1943 – Jun 1945)

No. 650 Squadron RAF was an anti aircraft co-operation squadron of the Royal Air Force during the Second World War.

== History ==
No. 650 squadron was formed on 1 December 1943 at RAF Cark, Cumbria, from 'D' Flight of 289 Squadron and 1614 (Anti-Aircraft Co-operation) Flight RAF. Commanded by Squadron Leader Victor Verity, it was equipped with Miles Martinets for target towing, and later also used Hawker Hurricanes in that role. In November 1944 it moved to RAF Bodorgan, Anglesey, Wales and was disbanded there on 26 June 1945.

== Aircraft operated ==
Aircraft operated by No. 650 Squadron RAF, data from
From	To	Aircraft	Version
December 1943	June 1945	Miles Martinet	Mk.I
April 1944	June 1945	Hawker Hurricane	Mk.IV

== Squadron bases ==
Bases and airfields used by No. 650 Squadron RAF, data from
From	To	Base	Remarks
1 December 1943	18 November 1944	RAF Cark, Lancashire	
18 November 1944	26 June 1945	RAF Bodorgan, Anglesey, Wales	Dets. at RAF Cark, Lancashire; RAF Woodvale, Lancashire; RAF Valley, Anglesey and RAF Hutton Cranswick, East Riding of Yorkshire

== See also ==
- List of Royal Air Force aircraft squadrons
