= RAF Manby =

Former Royal Air Force station in Lincolnshire, England

RAF Manby
- Manby, Lincolnshire in England

Site information
- Owner: Ministry of Defence
- Operator: Royal Air Force

Location
- Shown within Lincolnshire
- Coordinates: 53°21′29″N 0°04′54″E

Site history
- Built: 1937
- In use: 1937–1974
- Battles/wars: Second World War; Cold War

Royal Air Force Manby or more simply RAF Manby is a former Royal Air Force station located in Lincolnshire, England

The following units were here at some point:

- No. 1 Air Armament School (1937–1944) absorbed by the Empire Air Armament School (1944–1949) absorbed by the RAF Flying College (1949–1962) absorbed by the RAF College of Air Warfare (1962–1974)
- No. 25 (Flying Training) Group RAF
- No. 25 Group Communication Flight RAF (Reformed 1951–1961)
- No. 2782 Squadron RAF Regiment
- Armament Synthetic Development Unit
- School of Refresher Flying (1962–1973)
