= Walney Aerodrome =

Private airport in Cumbria, England

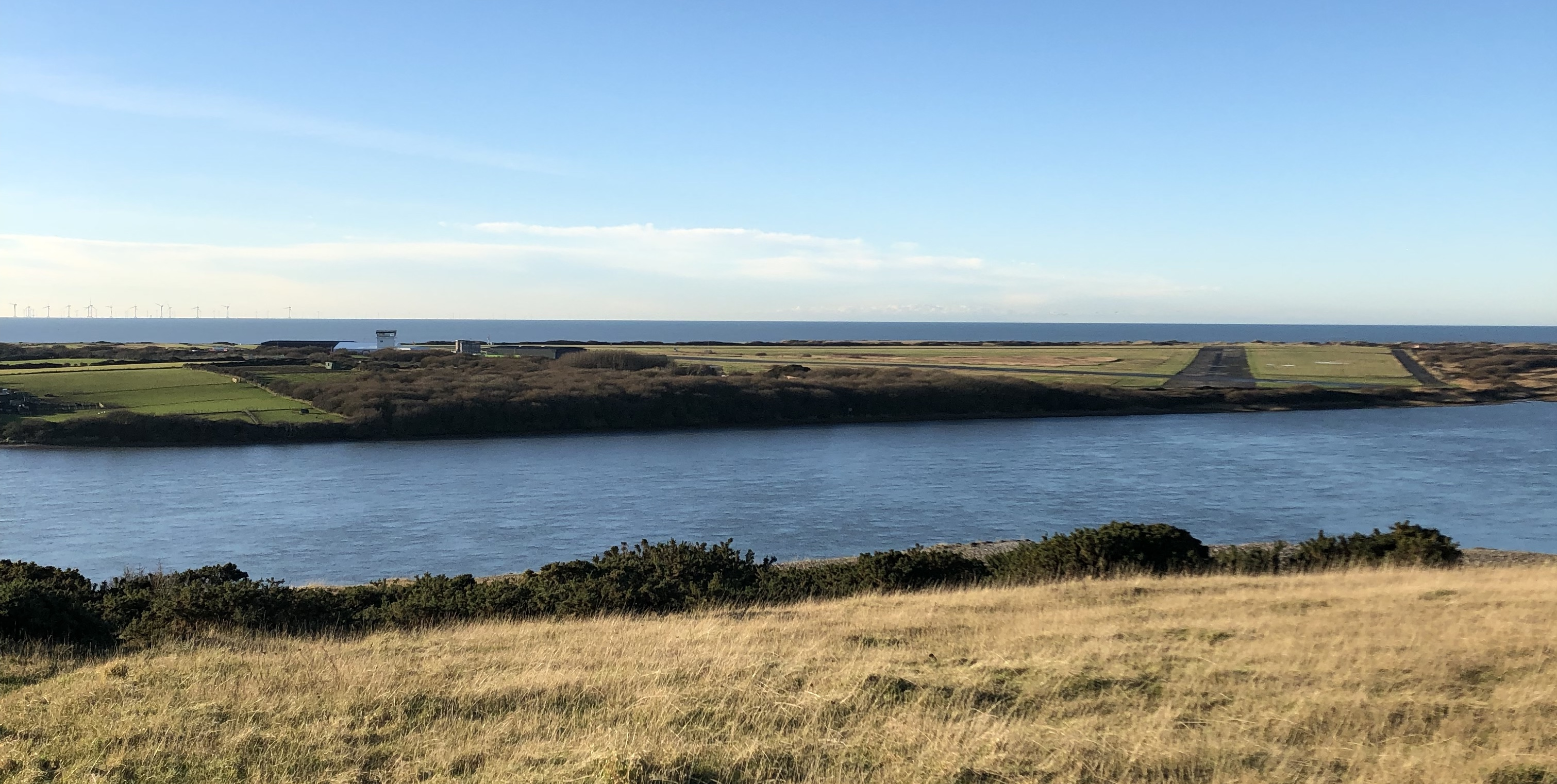
- The airfield, terminal building, hangars and control tower viewed across Walney Channel in December 2018
- IATA: BWF; ICAO: EGNL

Summary
- Airport type: Private
- Operator: BAE Systems Submarines
- Location: Barrow-in-Furness, Cumbria, England
- Elevation AMSL: 44 ft (13 m)
- Coordinates: 54°07′43″N 003°16′03″W

Map
- Location in Barrow-in-Furness Borough Location in Cumbria

Runways
Direction	Length		Surface
Direction	m	ft	Surface
17/35	1,011	3,317	Asphalt
05/23; Unlicensed	1,048	3,438	Asphalt
- Sources: UK AIP at NATS

Walney Aerodrome (IATA: BWF, ICAO: EGNL) (formerly RAF Walney Island) is located on Walney Island, 1.5 NM (1.7 mi; 2.8 km) northwest of the centre of Barrow-in-Furness, Cumbria, England. The airport is owned by BAE Systems, who operate private communication flights to locations across the United Kingdom and expanded the airport with new infrastructure and terminal buildings in 2019.

== History ==
Work on the construction of RAF Walney by Laing Construction began in 1940, though the site had been used as an airship station since the First World War. Designated as an Air Gunnery School, three runways were constructed, laid out in a triangular arrangement, for use by the based Royal Air Force flying units. Upon completion of Walney's airfield No. 25 Group RAF became the first group to take up post, followed a number of weeks later by a small group who were to form No. 3 Air Gunnery School.

Subsequently, the airfield was designated as No. 10 Air Gunnery School which came into being in October 1941, initially comprising 100 personnel, and was one of several situated around the coastline of the Irish Sea, which provided an ideal location for such training.

=== No. 10 Air Gunnery School ===
With the specialised aircrew required for the heavy bombers of Bomber Command, air gunners became a separate category. Each bomber required two or three gunners in its crew, so thousands were needed for the growing strategic offensive and to replace losses.

RAF Walney played an important role in the training programme, and thus began the busiest period in the life of the station. The school opened with 10 Westland Lysanders based on the station, providing towing aircraft for the target drones. There were also two Boulton Paul Defiants to provide airborne practice. By December 1941 there were 17 Defiants on the station, and there was accommodation for 100 officers, 140 sergeants and 1,200 airmen.

Whilst at Walney, the volunteer trainee air gunners underwent an intensive course before passing on to the operational training units of Bomber Command. Two types of courses were run from the Station: an 18-month course for wireless operators/air gunners, and a 6-month course for air gunners.

The courses involved sighting; aircraft recognition; pyrotechnics; clay-pigeon and 25 yard range shoots; care and maintenance of .303 and .5 Browning machine guns and 20mm cannon; turret hydraulics, manipulation and operation, and the use of cine-camera guns. The training huts were equipped with the various types of turrets then in use, including Boulton Paul Types A and F, and Frazer Nash 121.

By 1943 the Boulton Paul Defiants were becoming obsolete, mainly because only one student and one instructor could fly at a time. So the Defiants were replaced by Avro Ansons, much more suited to the task, and by the end of 1943 over 5,000 trainees had passed through RAF Walney.

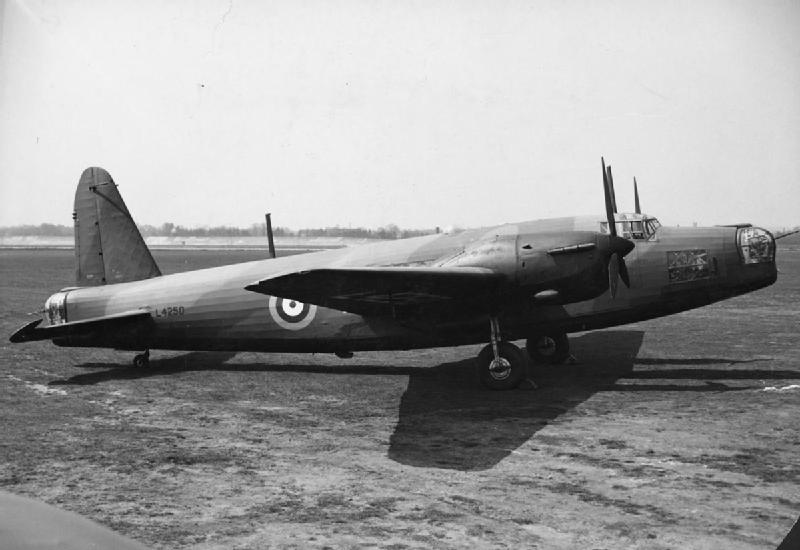
Vickers Wellington

Training continued through 1944 and into 1945, by which time the Avro Ansons began to be replaced by the Vickers Wellington, which was equipped with two turrets and camera guns, thereby offering more efficient training. In addition Hawker Hurricanes and Supermarine Spitfires were introduced to provide more realistic targets. During the latter part of 1945 the RAF Mountain Rescue Unit arrived at Walney from RAF Cark.

In 1946 No. 10 Air Gunnery School relocated to RAF Mona, and by the end of the year all flying based at RAF Walney had ceased. The Air Training Corps No. 188 Gliding School RAF from RAF Cark arrived at Walney and continued to use the airfield until 1955, when RAF Walney closed.

=== Post-war ===
The airfield was sold on in 1959 to Vickers, the company that owned Barrow shipyard. Commercial flights operated from the airport in the late 20th century but ceased in 1992.

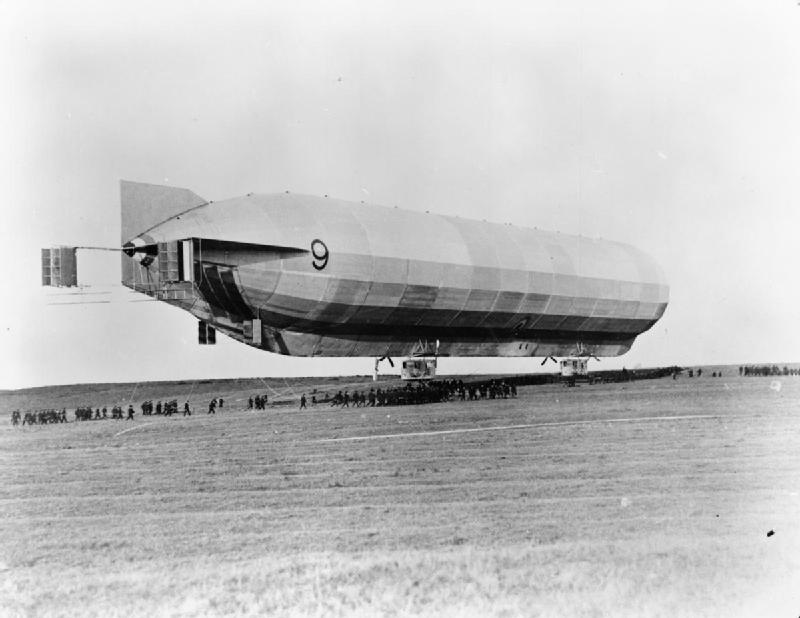
The No. 9r was built near the later Walney Airport site

=== Airship construction ===
During the early 20th century a site 1 mile south west of the airport was used for one of the UK's most important airship production facilities. For a brief period, the industry was as important for the local economy as Barrow's booming ship building industry. Between 1910 and 1920, such airships as No. 9r, R80, and the SS class blimp were constructed by Vickers, Sons and Maxim for the British Royal Navy at Walney, having relocated from alongside Cavendish Dock in Barrow.

=== Commercial era ===
Commercial flights used the airport during the 1980s and 1990s. Air Ecosse flew to Edinburgh, Carlisle and Liverpool from 1982 until 1983 using Twin Otter aircraft. Air Furness commenced scheduled passenger flights from the airport in 1984, flying predominantly to Manchester. The flights were designed to connect with international services from Manchester and were operated up to four times daily using Islander aircraft. Air Furness ceased operations in 1988. Despite a final attempt to run scheduled services from the airport in 1991–1992 by Telair, the airport is currently used only for private flights.

=== 21st century and expansion proposals ===
In 2004 a study into the airport indicated that a £1 million upgrade would attract thousands of business passengers a year flying to London and Europe. The study found that the business demand from South Cumbria would be equal to 4,500 journeys in a year, reaching 7,900 by 2020. Conversion of the airport into an international airport is only at a planning stage, but already the number of aircraft using the airfield has increased with the completion of an upgrade programme, including instrument landing system (ILS) installation for runway 35, resurfacing and re-lighting of runway 17/35, security fencing around the entire airfield and other improvements such as signage.

In 2005, an airshow was held at the site. Following its success a second was planned for 2007 but was later cancelled.

In 2016 BAE Systems submitted plans to Barrow Borough Council to redevelop and expand parts of the airport by constructing a new terminal and air traffic control tower, hangar, garage for support vehicles including a fire engine, a new car park and upgraded roadway and an aircraft apron. In the same year Ørsted proposed the construction of a heliport, additional hangar and associated office buildings. The latter however pursued an alternative location off Park Road, Sowerby Woods which was granted a 5-year permission to operate. This was closed shortly after opening due to lack of demand. BAE completed much of their expansion in 2018 and the new development was officially opened on 3 September 2019 by Rear Admiral Paul Methven DSMA.

The airport still has three runways with only two in present operation - 17/35 and 05/23. 11/29 is not currently in use as a runway.

== Aircraft ==
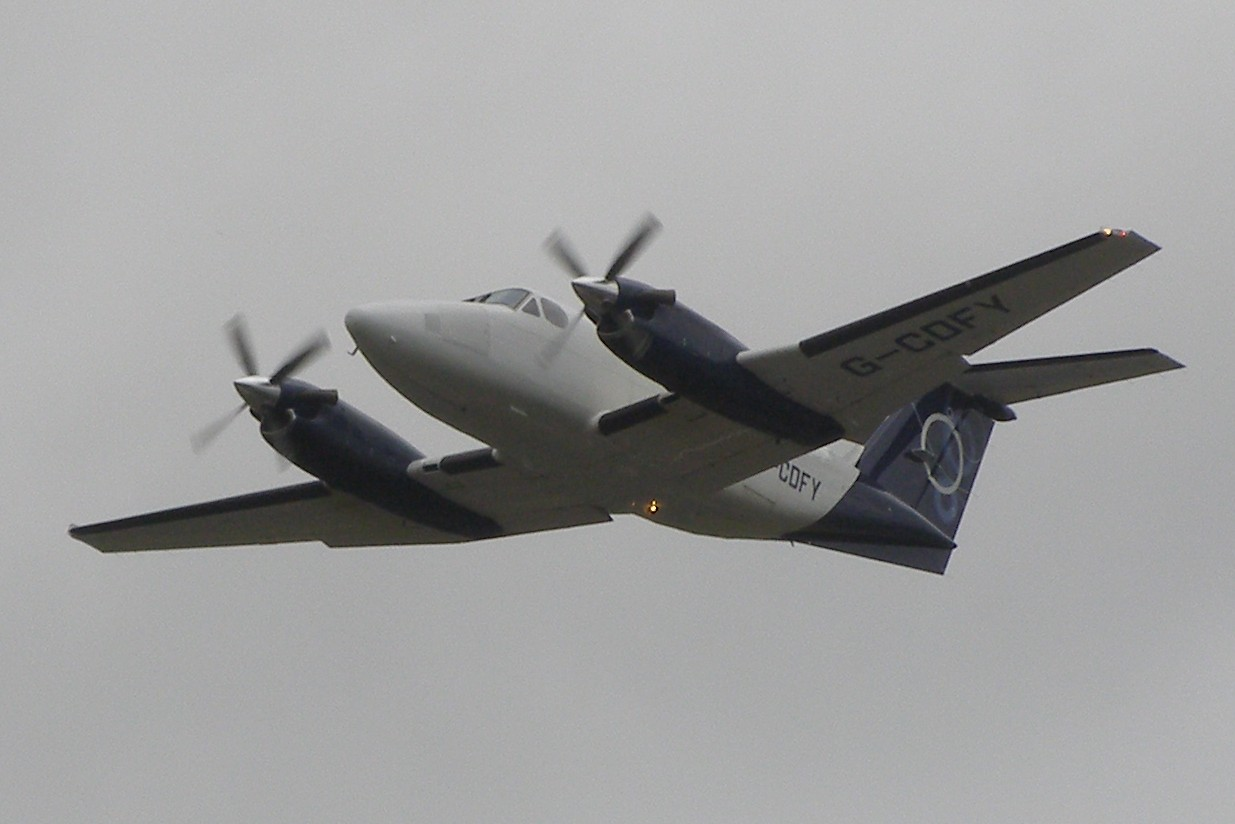
BAE G-CDFY previously used the airport until it was sold as in 2018 as N175LC

BAE Systems operates flights to UK destinations during the week, using four Beechcraft King Air B200 aircraft that are registered on the Isle of Man civil aircraft register as M-CDBM, M-CDJC, M-CDMS and M-LENR. This includes a twice-a-day shuttle to Farnborough, a three-times-a-day shuttle to Bristol and a twice daily shuttle to East Midlands.

The Lakes Gliding Club operated from the aerodrome at weekends until July 2023.

== Airlines and destinations ==
Below are the destinations flown to by the BAE corporate shuttle.

Airlines	Destinations
BAE	Bristol, Farnborough, Glasgow, Northolt, Southampton, Wick, East Midlands

== Accidents and incidents ==
On 26 November 1976, a Piper PA-31 Navajo from Edinburgh Airport was making its final approach to the airport. Due to adverse weather conditions and a poorly lit runway, the plane hit an embankment alongside the Walney Channel, killing the pilot and seriously injuring two passengers.
