= Fred Sutherland (RCAF airman) =

Royal Canadian Air Force airman (1923–2019)

Frederick Sutherland
- Born: Frederick Edwin Sutherland; 26 February 1923; Peace River, Alberta, Canada
- Died: 21 January 2019 (aged 95); Rocky Mountain House, Alberta
- Military career
- Allegiance: Canada / British Empire
- Branch: Royal Canadian Air Force
- Service years: 1941–1944
- Rank: Sergeant
- Units: No. 50 Squadron RAF; No. 617 Squadron RAF
- Conflicts: Second World War: European theatre; Operation Chastise; Operation Garlic

Sergeant Frederick Edwin Sutherland (26 February 1923 – 21 January 2019) was one of the original members of No. 617 Squadron RAF, who participated in Operation Chastise and who at the time of his death had become the penultimate survivor of that raid. In addition he also participated in the later Operation Garlic during the course of which his aircraft sustained significant damage requiring him to bail out. He subsequently evaded capture and successfully returned to the United Kingdom.

== Biography ==
Frederick Sutherland, known as Fred, was born in the small isolated township of Peace River, Alberta, on 26 February 1923, the son of Frederick Snr. and Clara Caroline (née Richards). Both his parents were in the medical profession, his father a doctor and his mother a nurse. He was the only son of his parents, who in addition had two daughters.

It is said that as a youngster his ambition was to be a bush pilot.

=== Service career ===
Sutherland joined the Royal Canadian Air Force (RCAF) in July 1941. Having undergone his initial training in Canada, he volunteered for the role of air gunner and was subsequently sent to the United Kingdom. He attended No. 7 Air Gunnery School (7 AGS) at RAF Stormy Down following which he was posted to No. 14 Operational Training Unit (14 OTU) at RAF Cottesmore. It was during his time at 14 OTU that he became a member of a crew commanded by Les Knight, which saw them converting onto the Vickers Wellington, and subsequently the Avro Manchester. During one particular sortie on the Manchester, both the aircraft's engines failed forcing Knight to make an emergency landing.

The numerous operational issues with the Manchester saw it retired quickly from front line operations, subsequently being replaced in part by the Avro Lancaster. Knight's crew converted onto the Lancaster in September 1942, following which they were posted to 50 Squadron (50 Sqn) at RAF Waddington. During his time with 50 Sqn, Sutherland flew 25 operations which saw them carrying out a wide variety of raids on such targets as Hamburg, Essen and Stuttgart as well as crossing the Alps in order to carry out a raid on Turin.

==== Operation Chastise ====
In March 1943, Les Knight was selected for the new Squadron X - subsequently renamed No. 617 Squadron (617 Sqn) - which formed at RAF Scampton, and Sutherland, along with the rest of Knight's crew, volunteered to accompany him.

Following a period of intensive training the crew participated on the raid against the Ruhr Dams on the night of 16/17 May 1943. Numerous decorations were bestowed on various members of 617 Sqn following Operation Chastise, however Sutherland was not officially recognised for his part in the raid. This decision not to reward the entire complement of his crew was said to have weighed heavily on Knight, who had been awarded the Distinguished Service Order.

==== Operation Garlic & evasion ====
Sutherland's final mission as part of 617 Sqn was on the night of 15/16 September 1943, when he took part in the raid on the two Glane culverts in the Dortmund-Ems Canal. Code-named Operation Garlic, the raid was tasked with severing a vital stretch of the canal to let water out onto the flatter lower plains, and as had been the case with the earlier Ruhr dams raid, the sortie required precision low flying to be carried out by the squadron. As a consequence of striking the tops of some trees, Knight's aircraft sustained damage to the radiators of its port engines which subsequently had to be shut down, following which Knight jettisoned his bomb.

Despite the limitations of performance, Knight managed to climb his aircraft to 1,400 ft (426.7 m) and was able to fly over the Dutch border before ordering his crew to bail out. Once his crew had successfully left the aircraft Knight attempted a forced landing, however on impact with the ground the aircraft blew up and he was subsequently killed.

Having bailed out, Sutherland landed in a field near the town of Zwolle and met up with his navigator, Sidney Hobday. Both men subsequently made contact with members of the Dutch Resistance. Issued with false papers stating he was a labourer working on the fortifications of Cherbourg, Sutherland was able to make his way to Paris from where he was subsequently passed down the Chemin de la Liberté escape route to Spain and on to Gibraltar. Following two months of evasion Sutherland arrived back in the United Kingdom on 6 December 1943.

==== Subsequent service ====
As a consequence of having transferred through various components of an evasion line, Sutherland was barred from undertaking any further operations (no airman who had evaded capture was again permitted to fly over occupied Europe for security reasons) and he returned to Canada at the end of 1943.

He served out the rest of his time in the RCAF as a gunnery instructor and concluded his service in 1944.

=== Personal life ===
Sutherland married Margaret Baker, the day after he returned to Canada on 4 January 1944. The marriage produced three children. He took employment as a clerk and completed his high school education by attending night classes.

He gained a degree in forestry, graduating from the University of British Columbia in 1957 following which he worked for the Alberta Forest Service. His work saw him taking postings in Edmonton, Blairmore and Calgary before the family settled in Rocky Mountain House in 1964 where he became Superintendent of the Rocky Clearwater Forest, from which he retired in 1986.

He returned to Europe in 2010, and met up with some of the people who had been part of the Chemin de la Liberté evasion line and who had assisted him in his escape.

=== Death ===
Fred Sutherland died at the Rocky Mountain House General Hospital on 21 January 2019. He was predeceased by his wife in 2017, and was survived by his three children (two sons and a daughter). His funeral took place on 29 January.

Following the death of Fred Sutherland, George "Johnny" Johnson became the last survivor of Operation Chastise.
