= Edith Allonby =

British writer

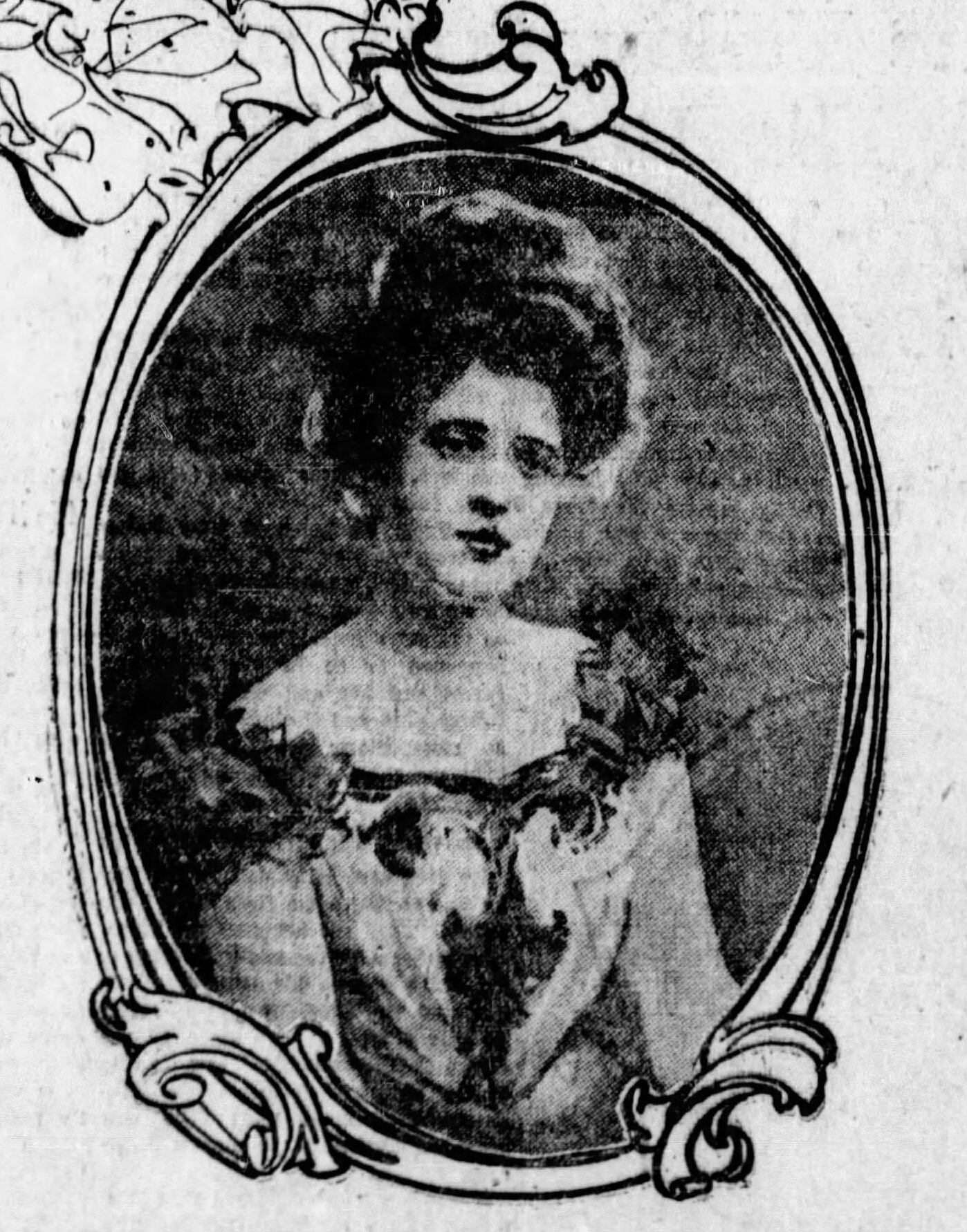
- Allonby in the San Francisco Examiner, 1905
- Born: 1 December 1875; Cark, Lancashire, England
- Died: 5 September 1905 (aged 29); Lancaster, Lancashire, England
- Occupations: Teacher, writer

Edith Allonby (1 December 1875 – 5 September 1905) was an English writer and teacher. (Her surname was sometimes spelled Allanby or Allenby.) She wrote two novels set on a fictional planet, and died by suicide hoping to bring more attention to her third novel.

== Early life ==
Allonby was born in Cark, the daughter of Joshua Allonby and Jane Deborah Orr Allonby. Her mother died when she was a small child. She studied at Whitelands College.

== Career ==
Allonby was a teacher and schoolmistress at St. Anne's National School in Lancaster. She wrote three novels: Jewell Sowers (1903), Marigold (1905), and The Fulfillment (1905). The first two novels, first published anonymously at her own request, are set on a fictional planet named "Lucifram"; "an experiment in fantasy... lightly written, bright, and entertaining", said a London reviewer of Jewel Sowers in 1904. Her last novel was published posthumously, and was presented as a fantasy inspired by divine revelation. "The passages omitted can only be guessed at. Those left are quite strange enough", commented an Australian reviewer on this final work, adding that Allonby "had a share of genius, and with a sound mind might have gone far".

== Death ==
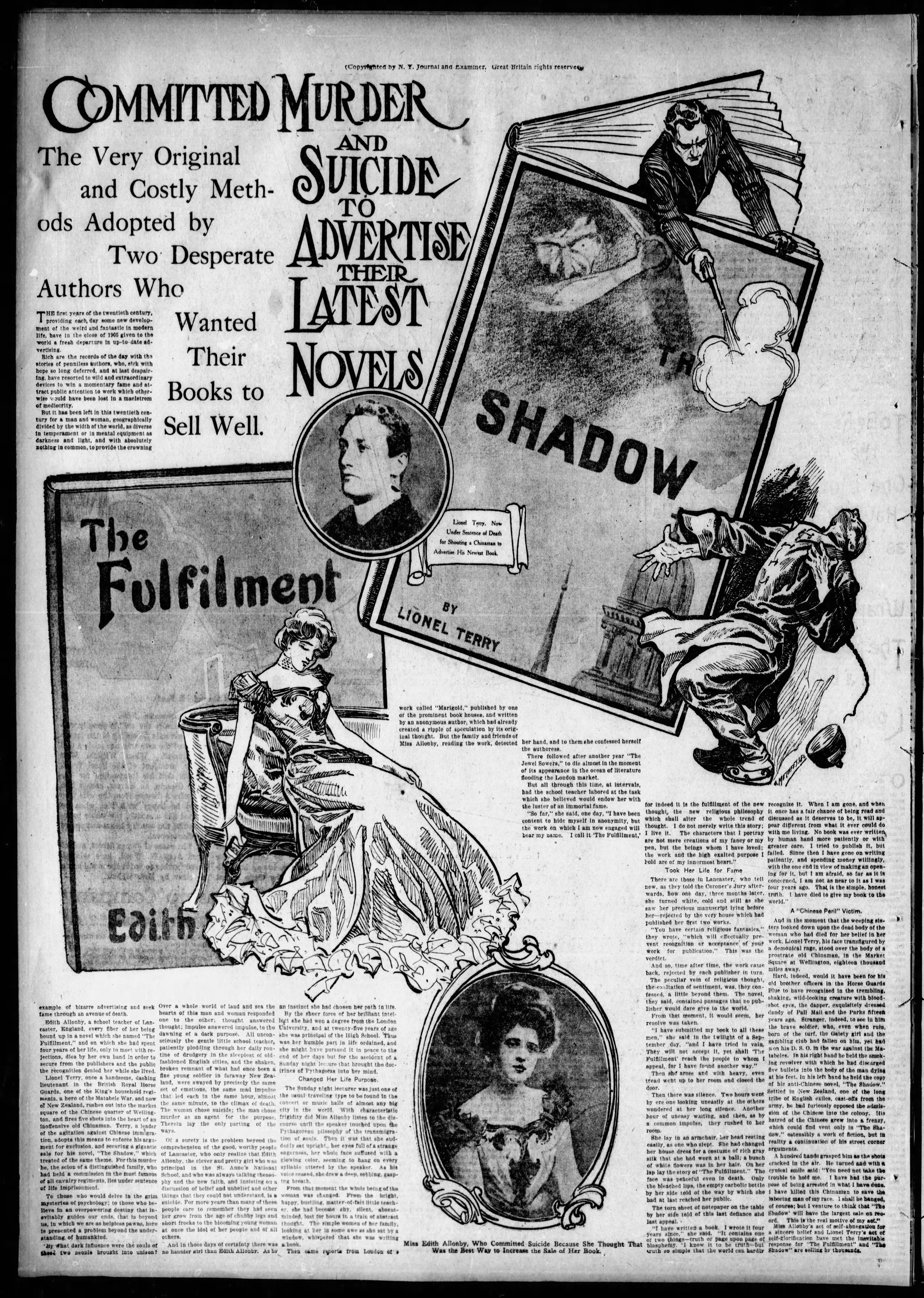
Article from The San Francisco Examiner about her case and Lionel Terry.

Frustrated by editors' requests for revisions, and the lack of attention her earlier novels gained, she died by intentionally drinking carbolic acid in 1905, aged 29 years, in Lancaster. She had obtained three bottles of the poison by sending an assistant to buy each bottle saying that it was required for a lesson at the school. Her suicide note, concluding with the statement "I have died to give God's gift to the world with as little stumbling block as possible", was published widely, including in The London Standard and The New York Times. The Fulfilment was published, with some editing and annotations, within months of her death. She left 6d each to all 214 students of St. Anne's National School, and the rest of her money to her four sisters, in her will.
