= Richard Trousdale =

New Zealand flying ace

Richard Macklow Trousdale
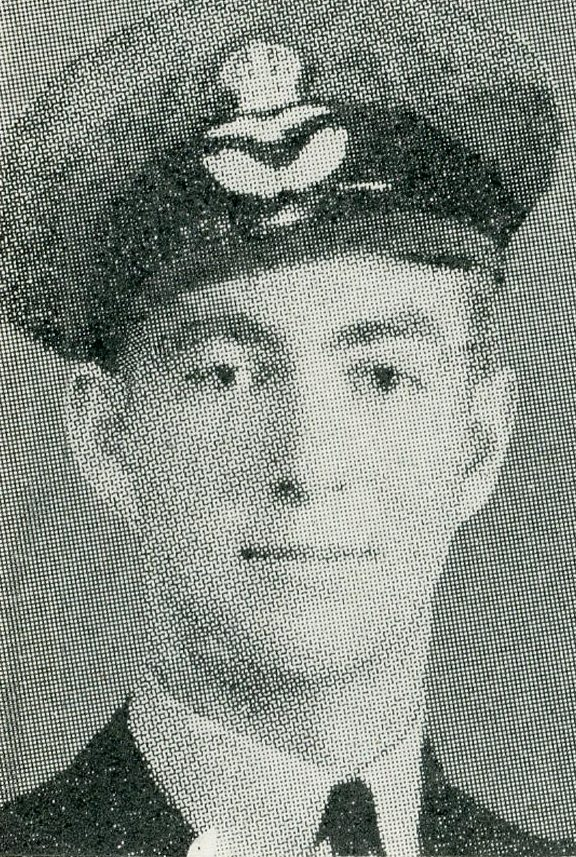
- Born: 23 January 1921; Waimate North, New Zealand
- Died: 16 June 1947 (aged 26); Near Pershore, England
- Military career
- Allegiance: New Zealand
- Branch: Royal Air Force (1939–1945); Royal New Zealand Air Force (1945–1947)
- Rank: Wing Commander
- Commands: No. 488 (NZ) Squadron
- Conflicts: Second World War; Battle of Britain; Channel Front
- Awards: Distinguished Flying Cross & Bar

Richard Macklow Trousdale DFC & Bar (23 January 1921 – 16 June 1947) was a New Zealand flying ace of the Royal Air Force (RAF) during the Second World War. He was credited with at least six, possibly seven, aerial victories.

Born in Waimate North, New Zealand, but raised in Auckland, Trousdale joined the RAF in 1939. After completing flight training, he was posted to No. 266 Squadron. He flew Supermarine Spitfires during the evacuation of the British Expeditionary Force from Dunkirk and during the subsequent Battle of Britain. He later flew with No. 255 and No. 409 Squadrons and achieved a number of aerial victories, many while flying Boulton Paul Defiants and Bristol Beaufighters on night fighting duties. In July 1942, he reformed No. 488 (NZ) Squadron and led it for several months. For much of the remainder of the war, he performed staff and training duties but transferred to the Royal New Zealand Air Force in January 1945. He was killed in a flying accident when his de Havilland Mosquito crashed near Pershore in England.

== Early life ==
Born on 23 January 1921 at Waimate North, in the Far North region of New Zealand, Richard Macklow Trousdale was the son of a farmer in the area, Archibald Trousdale, and his wife Clarice Rebecca Trousdale. The Trousdale family later moved south to Helensville and then to Howick, in Auckland. Trousdale was educated at Howick District High School. He applied for a short service commission in the Royal Air Force (RAF) in February 1938 and was accepted on a provisional basis at the end of the year. He left for the United Kingdom in February 1939, travelling on the RMS Tainui.

In the same draft as fellow New Zealander and future flying ace Victor Verity, Trousdale commenced his flight training at No. 11 Elementary and Reserve Flying Training School at the RAF station at Scone, near Perth, on 16 March, flying de Havilland Tiger Moths. He successfully completed the course and proceeded to a two-week induction into the RAF at Uxbridge. In late May, he began intermediate training at No. 9 Flying Training School at Hullavington as an acting pilot officer. He gained his wings at the end of August. He sought to be a bomber pilot and applied for training in this role. He was assessed as an exceptional student, having completed a month-long bombing and air firing course at Warmwell. In November 1939, he was posted to No. 266 Squadron, newly re-activated following the outbreak of the Second World War.

== Second World War ==
At the time of Trousdale's posting, No. 266 Squadron was being equipped with Fairey Battle light bombers. However, within a matter of weeks, these were replaced by Supermarine Spitfire fighter aircraft, Trousdale flying one of these for the first time in February 1940. By April, the squadron was operational. Flying from Martlesham Heath, it carried out convoy patrols along the southeast coastline of England. The following month, it moved to Wittering. It was involved in Operation Dynamo, flying patrols over the beaches at Dunkirk from which the British Expeditionary Force (BEF) was being evacuated from late May to early June. On 2 June, Trousdale and his flight engaged seven Messerschmitt Bf 110 heavy fighters and he subsequently claimed one of these as probably destroyed. The same day he also claimed a Messerschmitt Bf 109 fighter, but this was not confirmed. Once the BEF's evacuation had been completed, the squadron resumed training and convoy patrols.

=== Battle of Britain ===
On 11 August, No. 266 Squadron moved south to Tangmere and the next day began its involvement in the Battle of Britain by being part of a large dogfight over the Isle of Wight. Trousdale engaged several aircraft of the opposing Luftwaffe but without success. The squadron was briefly moved to the airfield at Eastchurch but its new location was then bombed and some of its aircraft destroyed. It subsequently moved to the RAF station at Hornchurch and was immediately heavily engaged. On 16 August, flying over Deal, Trousdale shot down a Bf 109 during a dogfight in which five of the six other Spitfires with which he was flying were destroyed. Two days later, he was credited with probably destroying another Bf 109, this time near Calais. On 21 August, having suffered a number of losses including its commander, the squadron moved back to Wittering to rebuild. Once it had sufficient numbers, the squadron began patrolling the airfields of No. 12 Group. On the morning of 7 September, Trousdale and two other pilots intercepted a Dornier Do 217 bomber over East Anglia and pursued it to the Scheldt estuary, off the Dutch coast, where it was shot down. Despite all three pilots being involved in destroying the aircraft, Trousdale, who damaged one of the Do 217's engines and shot off its tail, may have received the sole credit for shooting it down. At the end of October, he destroyed a Bf 109. He was promoted to flying officer early the next month.

=== Night fighting duties ===
In mid-November, Trousdale, promoted to acting flight lieutenant, was transferred to No. 255 Squadron. At the time, it was being reformed to help with the aerial defence of the Midlands. Based at Kirton-in-Lindsey it was equipped with Boulton Paul Defiant night fighters. Trousdale was to be one of the unit's flight commanders while it was working up to operational status, which was achieved in January 1941. It began coming into contact with bombers of the Luftwaffe the next month, with Trousdale and his gunner, Sergeant Chunn, credited with the probable shooting down of a Heinkel He 111 medium bomber off Spurn Head on 10 February. Trousdale was awarded the Distinguished Flying Cross in early March; the citation, published in The London Gazette, read:

Since the early months of the war, this officer has been continuously employed as a fighter pilot and his keenness and enthusiasm for operations has been most marked. He has destroyed at least four enemy aircraft, including one at night.

— London Gazette, No. 35094, 4 March 1941.

The squadron's pace of operations increased in the following weeks and on the night of 9 May, Trousdale and Chunn combined to shoot down two He 111s that were raiding Hull. The squadron was responsible for shooting down six bombers that night. Trousdale was taken off operations in July to serve in a staff role at the headquarters of No. 12 Group. His work was in relation to night fighting duties and came with a promotion to acting squadron leader. On 1 October, he was posted to No. 409 Squadron as a flight commander, still holding his acting rank. His new unit was Canadian and working up to operational status with Bristol Beaufighters for night fighting duty. Later in the month he damaged a Dornier Do 17 bomber. By November the squadron was regularly flying night patrols but a quiet spell followed and it was not until the night of 8 March 1942 that Trousdale achieved another aerial victory, when he and his radar operator, Sergeant Affleck, destroyed a He 111 over Hull. He shot down a Do 217 on the night of 7 April; the aircraft was seen to crash into the sea off the Lincolnshire coast. He was awarded a bar to his DFC in May, the published citation reading:

This officer is an exceptionally skilful and keen fighter pilot. He has destroyed 8 hostile aircraft, 5 of which he has shot down at night.

— London Gazette, No. 35551, 8 May 1942.

=== No. 488 Squadron ===
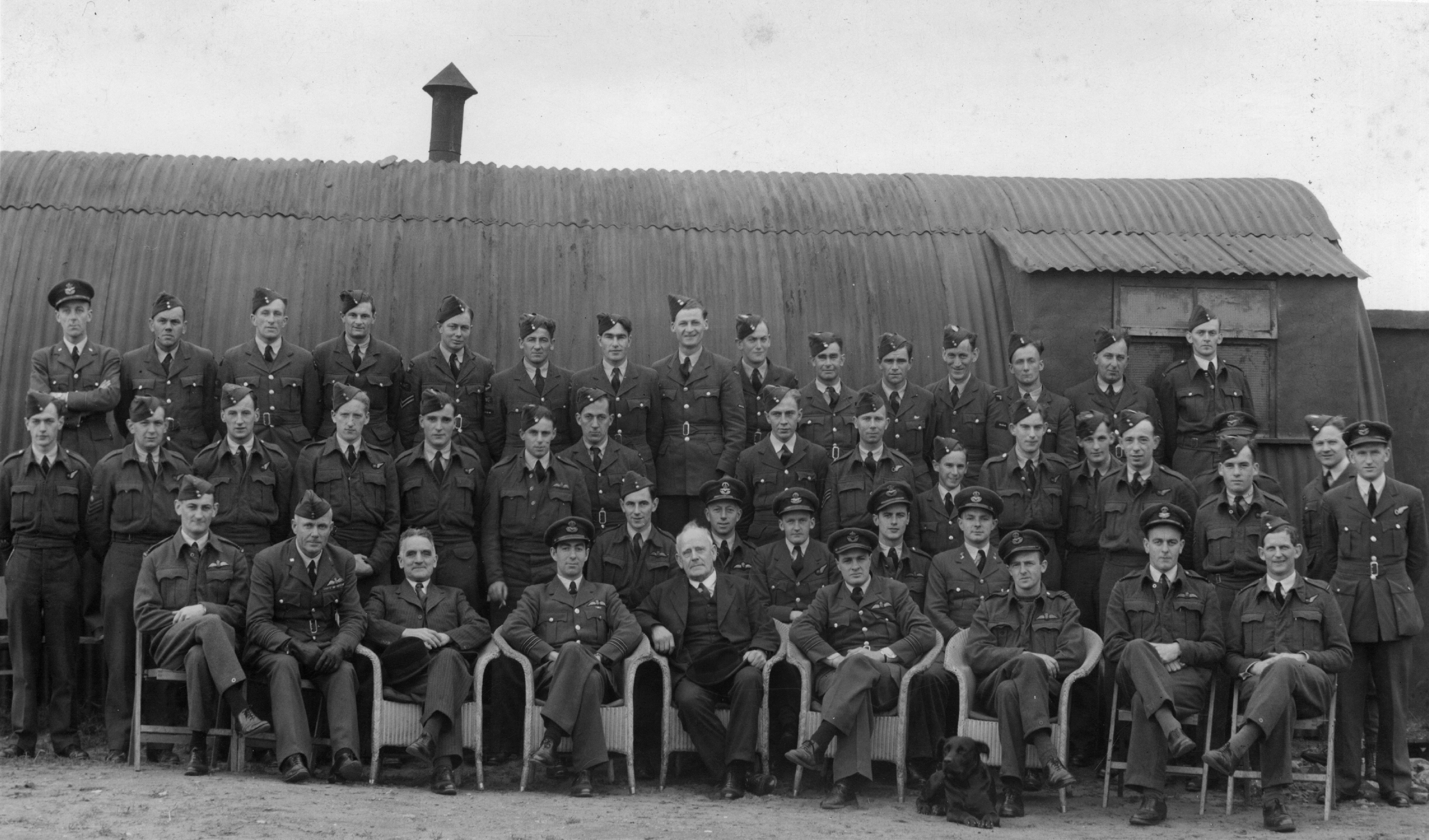
Personnel of No. 488 Squadron, on the occasion of a visit from William Jordan, the New Zealand High Commissioner to the United Kingdom, 27 September 1942; Jordan is seated in the centre, wearing a suit while Trousdale is seated fourth left.

Promoted to acting wing commander in July, Trousdale was posted to Church Fenton to take command of No. 488 Squadron. The original incarnation of the squadron had been raised for service in British Malaya but had been disbanded after the fall of Singapore; it was now being reformed at Church Fenton as a night fighter squadron operating Beaufighters. Trousdale set about bringing the squadron up to operational status, implementing training programs despite having inadequate personnel and equipment. At the start of September, the squadron moved to Ayr in Scotland where it continued training, including working with ground-based radar operators. It began flying missions to intercept incoming bombers identified by radar the following month although these were relatively few in number.

Ranger missions, nighttime flights to occupied Europe that targeted German transportation infrastructure, began to be flown in February 1943. On one of these, mounted on 15 February, Trousdale damaged a train at Courtrai and two barges. Later in the month, he was posted to the headquarters of No. 13 Group in a training capacity for the next several months. In March 1944, he was attached to the Aeroplane and Armament Experimental Establishment at Boscombe Down; here he gained experience with a variety of aircraft, including the Avro Lancaster heavy bomber. He also attended a course for test pilots.

== Service with RNZAF ==
At the start of 1945, having completed the five-year term of his short service commission in the RAF, Trousdale transferred to the Royal New Zealand Air Force (RNZAF). He remained in the United Kingdom, serving at the Telecommunications Flying Unit based at Defford and gaining flight experience with a variety of multi-engined aircraft. He ended the war credited with having destroyed six enemy aircraft, possibly seven, with a share in another destroyed as well as two or three probably destroyed and one damaged. Military aviation historians Christopher Shores and Clive Williams consider that it is possible that one of the probables was actually confirmed.

Trousdale returned to New Zealand in January 1946 with his wife, who he had married in 1941, and their two children. He had an extensive period of leave and then formally commenced his service with the RNZAF in late April 1947 with the rank of squadron leader.

Trousdale returned to the United Kingdom the next month, tasked with collecting and ferrying a de Havilland Mosquito fighter bomber back to New Zealand. On 16 June, while conducting flight checks on a Mosquito in which he was flying as second pilot, he was killed when it stalled in low level flight and crashed near Pershore, Worcestershire. He is buried at Haycombe Cemetery in Bath, Somerset. His wife, a former officer in the Women's Auxiliary Air Force, took the couple's two children back to the United Kingdom after his death but subsequently returned to live in New Zealand.
