= Victor Verity =

New Zealand flying ace (1919–1979)

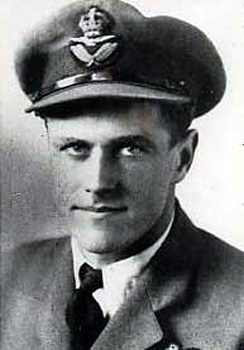
- Verity, c. 1939–1945
- Born: Victor Bosanquet Strachan Verity; 5 November 1919; Timaru, New Zealand
- Died: 2 February 1979 (aged 59); Wellington, New Zealand
- Military career
- Allegiance: United Kingdom; New Zealand
- Branch: Royal Air Force; Royal New Zealand Air Force
- Service years: 1938–1943 (RAF); 1943–1945 (RNZAF)
- Rank: Squadron leader
- Commands: No. 650 Squadron
- Conflicts: Second World War; Battle of France; Battle of Britain; The Blitz; Western Desert campaign; Sicilian campaign
- Awards: Distinguished Flying Cross

Victor Bosanquet Strachan Verity, DFC (5 November 1919 – 2 February 1979) was a New Zealand flying ace of the Royal Air Force (RAF) during the Second World War. He is credited with the destruction of at least eight enemy aircraft.

Born in Timaru, Verity joined the RAF in 1938. After completing his flight training, he was posted to No. 229 Squadron where he flew a Hawker Hurricane. During the Battle of France, he was briefly transferred to No. 615 Squadron, claiming his first aerial victories with this unit, before returning to No. 229 Squadron. Further victories were claimed during the Battle of Britain but in October he switched to night-fighting duties, flying with No. 422 Flight and then No. 96 Squadron. Now flying the Boulton Paul Defiant, he and his gunner made a number of successful engagements in the spring and summer of 1941. He later flew in the Middle East and the Mediterranean before transferring to the Royal New Zealand Air Force and returning to England. He undertook instructing and staff duties in the final years of the war. Returning to civilian life after the end of hostilities, he initially farmed in New Zealand and then worked in the construction sector in England. His health declined in his later years and he died in Wellington, New Zealand, aged 59.

== Early life ==
Victor Bosanquet Strachan Verity was born at Timaru, New Zealand, on 5 November 1919, the son of C. S. Verity, a farmer, and his wife. His schooling was at Longridge School, and then, from 1932 to 1934, Timaru Boys' High School. After completing his education, he worked on the family farm. Desiring a career in the Royal Air Force (RAF), he applied for a short-service commission. His application was successful, and he left New Zealand for the United Kingdom on 1 February 1939, sailing aboard the RMS Tainui.

In the same draft as fellow New Zealander and future flying ace Richard Trousdale, flying training was initially at the No. 11 Elementary & Reserve Flying Training School at the RAF station at Scone, near Perth. Successfully passing through this stage of training, he proceeded to Uxbridge for induction into the RAF as an acting pilot officer; his short-service commission had been confirmed. In May, Verity went to No. 9 Flying Training School at Hullavington, where he gained his wings. His pilot officer rank was made substantive with effect from 6 November and he was posted to No. 229 Squadron later in the month.

== Second World War ==
With the Second World War now underway, Verity's new unit, based at Digby, had just been formed as a squadron of Fighter Command and operated the Bristol Blenheim. It became operational in late December, undertaking patrols over the North Sea as cover for the British fishing fleet. It also began training for a night-fighting role and was involved in testing of radio direction finders. In March 1940, the squadron began converting to the Hawker Hurricane fighter.

=== Battle of France ===
On 14 May, Verity and two other pilots from his unit were attached to No. 615 Squadron, another Hurricane squadron. At the time, it was based in France and heavily engaged with the Luftwaffe following the German invasion of that country. He was swiftly in action and on 20 May he damaged two Junkers Ju 88 medium bombers. However, his Hurricane was attacked and damaged by the escorting Messerschmitt Bf 110 heavy fighters and he had to crash land at the squadron's aerodrome at Norrent-Fontes. The squadron returned to England the next day. Verity, his aircraft being unserviceable, followed, travelling by road to Cherbourg, where he boarded a steamer to cross the Channel. He returned to No. 229 Squadron on 23 May, to discover he had been reported as missing in action.

Over the period 26 May to 4 June, No. 229 Squadron, operating from Biggin Hill and Manston, flew in support of Operation Dynamo, the evacuation of the British Expeditionary Force from Dunkirk. Verity destroyed a Bf 110 over Dunkirk on 31 May but his aircraft was damaged in the encounter and he bailed out into the English Channel. He was picked up by a paddle steamer and was able to rejoin his squadron the next day. His victory over the Bf 110 was confirmed by the captain of the paddle steamer.

=== Battle of Britain ===
On 5 June No. 229 Squadron returned to Digby and resumed convoy patrols. Depleted by its recent activities, it was shifted to Wittering so it could build up its strength again. It moved south in September to take part in the Battle of Britain. Based at Northolt as part of No. 11 Group, it was heavily involved in the aerial fighting over London, flying almost every day that month. Verity shot down a Heinkel He 111 medium bomber over Brooklands on 11 September, and also damaged a Bf 110. By the end of the month, the intensity of operations was reducing but he destroyed a Ju 88 on 4 October.

Verity volunteered for night-fighting duties in mid-October and was duly posted to No. 422 Flight. It was based at Shoreham and operated Hurricanes as a fighter-interceptor unit, regularly moving to Tangmere for this purpose. On 6 November Verity, having just been promoted to flying officer, damaged a Ju 88. A week later he damaged another Ju 88 and was also credited with a share in a destroyed Ju 88.

=== The Blitz ===
On 18 December, No. 422 Flight became No. 96 Squadron, based at Cranage, and was tasked with the defence of Liverpool and its environs. The squadron began converting to the Boulton Paul Defiant night-fighter in March 1941, but not before Verity secured a final aerial victory in a Hurricane, claiming a He 111 as probably destroyed on 15 March. Once the conversion to the Defiant was complete, Verity was paired up with an air gunner, Sergeant F. W. Wake. The duo gained their first aerial victory as a team when, on the night of 3/4 May, they destroyed a Ju 88. A He 111, spotted against fires burning in Liverpool was shot down on the night of 6/7 May and in a second sortie later that night, Verity and Wake claimed a Ju 88 as probably destroyed.

Another Ju 88 was destroyed by Verity and Wake on the night of 7/8 May near Wrexham and a second was claimed as probably destroyed in the same sortie. May was a particularly successful time for the squadron, with other pilots also claiming bombers as destroyed but Luftwaffe activity in the Midlands slowed down in the following weeks and there was a number of quiet patrols. Verity achieved one further aerial victory with the squadron, a He 111 shot down on the night of 7/8 July. By this time he was an acting flight lieutenant, having been promoted the previous month. He and Wake were recognised for their endeavours for the past few months with an award of a Distinguished Flying Cross and Distinguished Flying Medal respectively in August.

The citation, which incorrectly gives Verity's rank as a squadron leader, was published in The London Gazette and read:

Squadron Leader Verity has shown a fine example by the skill with which he has intercepted enemy aircraft at night and the determination he has displayed in his attacks. He has destroyed at least two and damaged two other hostile aircraft. In most of his combats, Squadron Leader Verity has been accompanied by Sergeant Wake who, as an air gunner, has displayed great skill, determination and courage.

— London Gazette, No. 35247, 15 August 1941.

=== Later war service ===
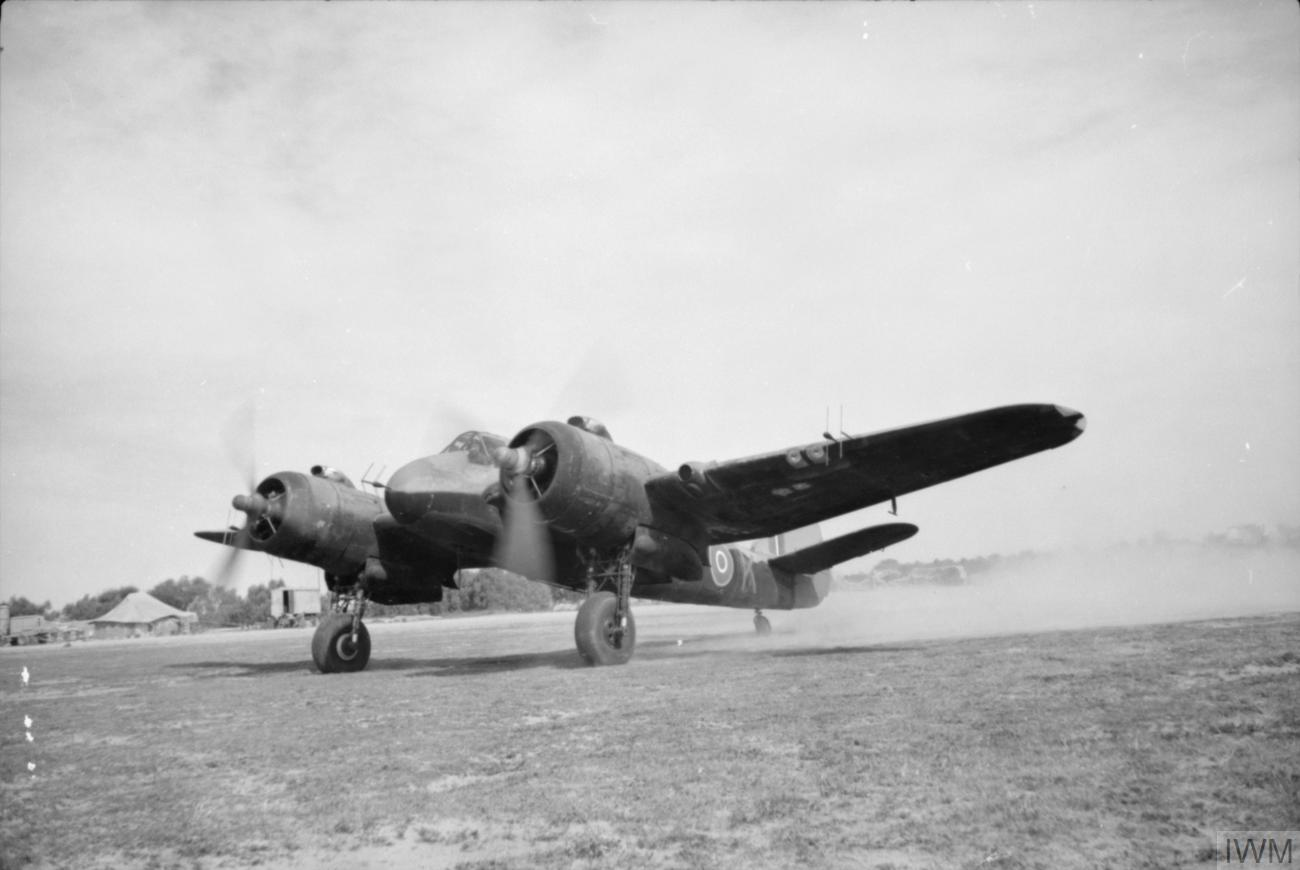
A Bristol Beaufighter of No. 89 Squadron

In March 1942, Verity was sent to the Middle East, arriving there in June and subsequently posted to No. 73 Squadron. At the time, it was mostly engaged in night intruder missions with its Hurricanes, with occasional day patrols as well. After a couple of months of operations, in September Verity was sent to an aircraft delivery unit, where he was expected to gain experience on the Bristol Beaufighter. In early 1943, he was posted to No. 89 Squadron, based at Abu Suweir Air Base in Egypt. Paired with a navigator, Warrant Officer Farquharson, he was sent to Luqa, on the island of Malta, as part of a detached flight of the squadron. This flight formed part of Malta's aerial defences, and was soon absorbed by No. 108 Squadron. He and Farquharson achieved the unit's first aerial victory when on the night of 17/18 April, guided by his Beaufighter's radar, they destroyed a He 111 off Trapani, on the island of Sicily.

In mid-1943, Verity returned to England in a rest from active duty. By this time, he had flown on 375 sorties. After a period of leave he returned to duty in a staff role at the headquarters of Fighter Command as one of the controller of night-fighter operations against the Luftwaffe airbases from which the German night-fighters were operating. In late August he was promoted to squadron leader. Three months later he was briefly assigned to No. 1622 Flight, at Gosport, before taking up command of No. 650 Squadron. At the end of the year, and with his short-service commission at an end, Verity transferred to the Royal New Zealand Air Force although he remained in his current posting.

Verity's command was a training formation, towing targets for units of the British Army that were practising anti-aircraft operations as part of their preparations for the forthcoming invasion of Normandy. Surplus to requirements following the landings on D-Day, No. 650 Squadron was later disbanded. In the meantime, Verity proceeded to No. 62 Operational Training Unit at Usworth, where he helped in the instruction of navigators. In June 1945, and with the war in Europe at an end, he was posted to the Headquarters of No. 12 Group. He ended his service in the RAF in November, having spent his final weeks in an administrative role at Hereford.

Verity finished the war credited with eight sole aerial victories, plus one shared. He was also credited with three German aircraft probably destroyed, four damaged plus another shared as damaged.

== Later life ==
Returning to New Zealand in November 1945, having travelled aboard the RMS Andes, Verity was transferred to the Air Force Reserve early the following year. He took up farming in South Canterbury but in 1959 relocated his family to England. Settling in Northampton, he started up a business in the roofing industry. Ten years later, he went back to New Zealand, initially based in Nelson and later in Paekākāriki as his health began to decline. He died on 2 February 1979 while in care at Wellington Hospital.
