= RAF College of Air Warfare =

RAF College of Air Warfare
- Active: 1962-74 as last formation 1942-1946; 1946-49; 1949-1962
- Disbanded: 1974
- Country: United Kingdom
- Branch: Royal Air Force
- Type: Training; War college
- Role: RAF flying training
- Last base: RAF Manby

The RAF College of Air Warfare was a Royal Air Force flying training unit operational between 1962 and 1974. The unit traces its history back to 1942 as the Empire Central Flying School. The School of Refresher Flying was formed here on 1 July 1962 at Manby.

== History ==
The College started off life as the Empire Central Flying School at RAF Hullavington whose main aim was to teach flying instructors and to maintain the standards of teaching and course content in the flying training system at British Empire flying schools, such as those of the British Commonwealth Air Training Plan, located worldwide. The school had Instructional, Research and Examining flights from the Central Flying School along with a Handling Squadron RAF. These flight used various aircraft including Miles Magisters, de Havilland Tiger Moths, Gloster Gladiators, Avro Ansons and Airspeed Oxfords along with various other training, fighter and bomber aircraft.

The Handling Squadron was operational as part of Empire Central Flying School from 28 February 1942 and as part of the future units until 12 April 1954 when as No. 3 (Handling) Squadron the control of the squadron was transferred to the Aeroplane and Armament Experimental Establishment.

The unit was renamed the Empire Flying School on 7 May 1946. In 1949 the examining wing was transferred to the Central Flying School at RAF Brize Norton, and other roles of the school were transferred to the RAF Flying College at RAF Manby. The unit was formally disbanded on 31 July 1949.

No. 1 Air Armament School was operational between 1 November 1937 and 28 October 1944 at Manby and was absorbed by the Empire Air Armament School which in turn was absorbed by the Royal Air Force Flying College on 31 July 1949 while at Manby.

The Royal Air Force Flying College was formed at RAF Manby on 1 June 1949 and operated various aircraft including Percival Prentices, Percival Provosts, Gloster Meteors, Handley Page Hastings, and Hawker Hunters amongst others. The unit was disbanded on 1 July 1962 and became the Royal Air Force College of Air Warfare which operated Vickers Valettas, Vickers Varsitys, English Electric Canberras, BAC Jet Provosts and Hawker Siddeley Dominies amongst others.

The flying college comprised: No. 1 Squadron (Bombers), No. 2 Squadron (Fighters), No. 3 Squadron (Handling) and No. 4 Squadron (Development).

== Air Display Team ==
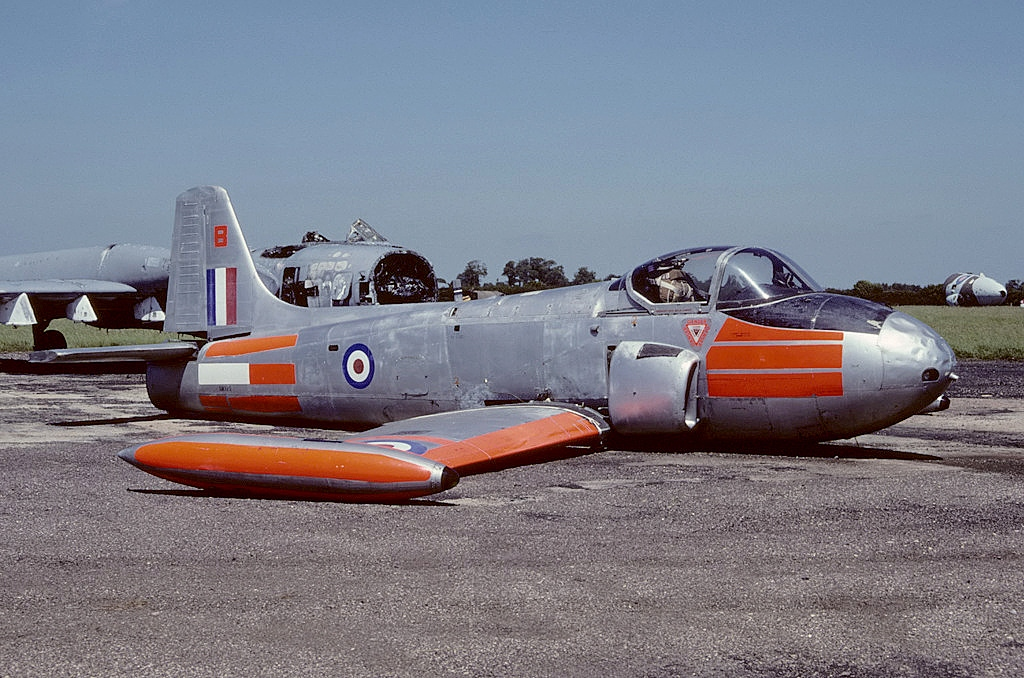
A JP in standard RAF dayglo colours, shown here after a wheels-up landing

The College formed a display team in 1965, called "The Magistrates" with the name originating from the initials "JP", the common nickname for the Jet Provost. In late 1967, the team name was changed to the "Macaws". This name was constructed from the first letters of the unit, MAnby College of Air Warfare. The team wore the standard silver and dayglo training colours, but in 1968, the display aircraft were re-sprayed into a unique colour scheme of light grey and red. From 1969 the Jet Provosts adopted the now-standard red/white/grey scheme but had special team markings applied. The "Macaws" flew six basic formations, their display culminating in a "Petal Break". During the 1971 and 1972 display seasons the team was led by Flt Lt Brian Hoskins, and he later went on to lead the Red Arrows.

The team's final season occurred in 1973, in common with several other RAF displays teams, due the effects of the 1973 oil crisis.

== See also ==
- Empire Test Pilots' School (ETPS)
