= Gloucestershire Airport =

Gloucestershire Airport Gloucester M5 Airport

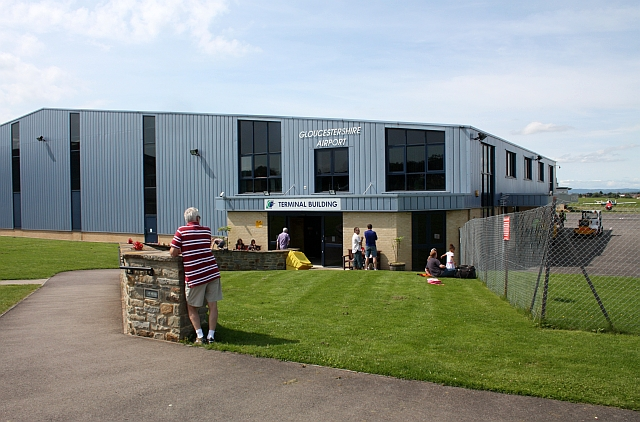
- IATA: GLO; ICAO: EGBJ

Summary
- Airport type: Public/Military
- Owner: Gloucester City and Cheltenham Borough Council
- Operator: Gloucestershire Airport Limited
- Serves: M5 Area, Gloucester
- Location: Churchdown, Gloucestershire, England
- Elevation AMSL: 101 ft (31 m)
- Coordinates: 51°53′39″N 002°10′02″W
- Website: www.gloucestershireairport.co.uk

Map
- Location in Gloucestershire FBO = Weston Aviation

Runways
Direction	Length		Surface
Direction	m	ft	Surface
04/22	988	3,241	Asphalt
09/27	1,431	4,695	Asphalt
~~18/36~~	799	2,621	~~Asphalt~~
04G/22G	304	997	Grass

Statistics (2013)
- Movements: 73,857
- Passengers: 14,168
- Sources: UK AIP at NATS; Statistics from the UK Civil Aviation Authority

Gloucestershire Airport (IATA: GLO, ICAO: EGBJ), formerly Staverton Airport, is a small airport located in Churchdown, England. It lies 4 miles (6.4 kilometres) west of Cheltenham, near the city of Gloucester and close to the M5 motorway.

== History ==
An airfield was opened in 1931, named after the local village of Down Hatherley; the change of name to Staverton followed relocation to the present site, near Staverton village. The airfield served as a training base for pilots during the Second World War and was known as RAF Staverton. It was later used by Alan Cobham as he developed in-flight refuelling. A pillbox that was part of the British anti-invasion preparations of the Second World War can still be found opposite the main airfield entrance. With its proximity to Cheltenham, it was also used extensively by the U.S. Army, particularly the Service of Supply under its commanding general, Lt. Gen. John C. H. Lee, who was responsible for all supply and administrative functions of U.S. forces in Britain, beginning in May 1942.

After the war, what is now Smiths Group used the airport as a test site for various aircraft. At the same time the airport provided scheduled services to the Channel Islands, Dublin and Isle of Man. In the 1960s the Skyfame Museum, dedicated to World War II aircraft, opened.

In the 1990s, both the Police Aviation Services and Bond Air Services stationed helicopters and their headquarters at Staverton. In 1993, its name was changed to Gloucestershire Airport in an effort to "reflect its increasing prominence as the business aviation centre for the county".

During the 1990s, Staverton was the home of the MidWest production facility where the company manufactured the MidWest AE series of single- and twin-rotor Wankel aero-engines for light aircraft. The twin-rotor engine was first installed into two ARV Super2 aircraft. Midwest was eventually closed down, and its assets bought by Austrian manufacturer Diamond Aircraft Industries.

Between 2013 and 2017, Citywing operated scheduled flights from the airport, describing it as "Gloucester (M5) Airport" and marketing it as an alternative to Birmingham Airport, Bristol Airport and to a lesser extent Oxford Airport.

=== Expansion ===
In 2009, the airport was granted planning permission for expansion, first proposed in 2006, which included lengthening a runway. The plans were controversial and proved divisive amongst the local community and authorities. In March 2015, Gloucestershire Airport announced that it will look to provide more flights, more hangars and more profits in the coming years as part of a new vision for the transport hub. The business plan will see £6 million invested in the airport between 2015 and 2025.

The former north–south runway 18/36 was closed in August 2023 after the main runways 09/27 & 04/22 were re-surfaced. The former runway is now Taxiways D & G.

== Services and facilities ==
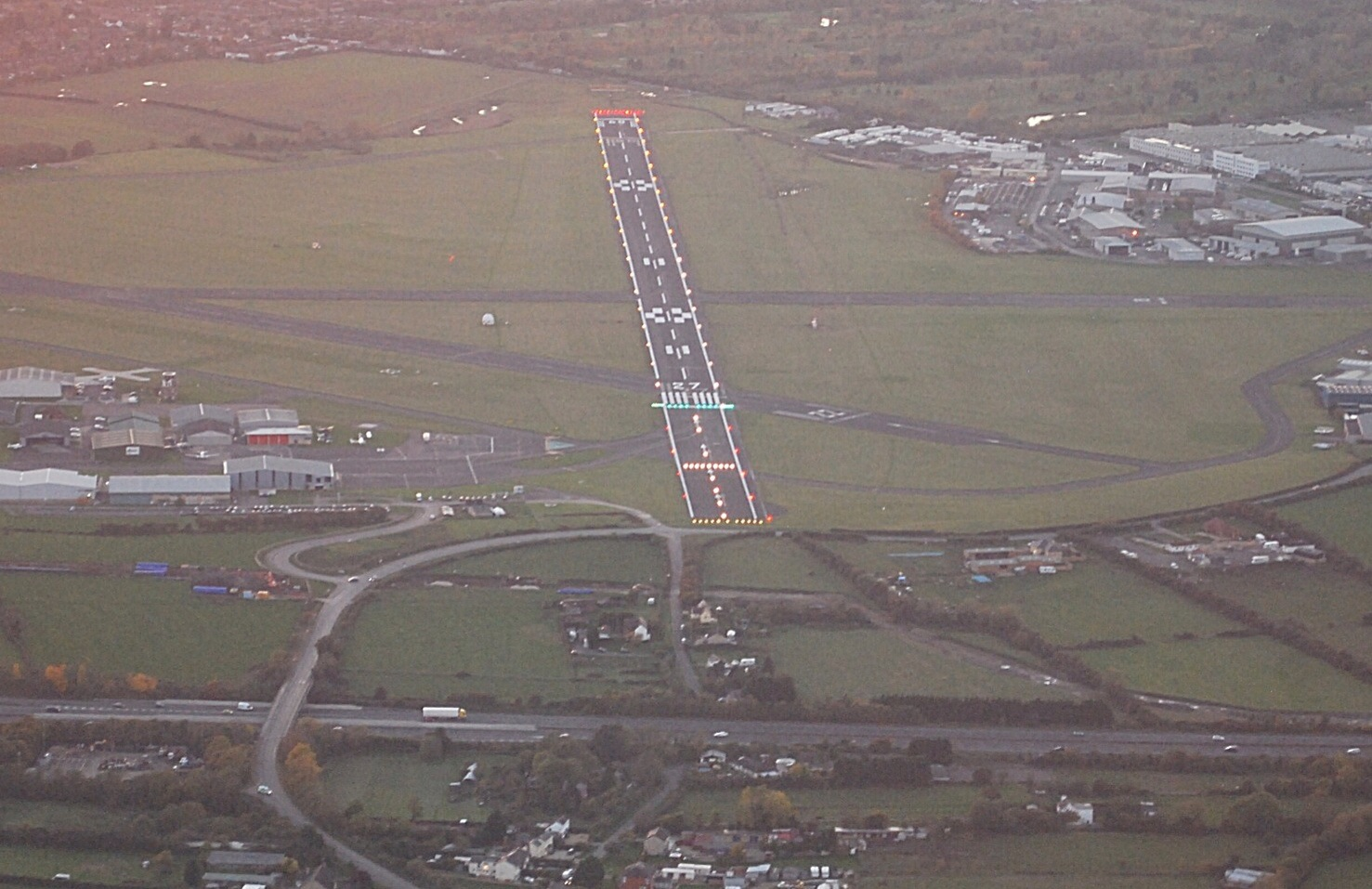
Runway 27 from the air in October 2012, showing the newly installed lighting

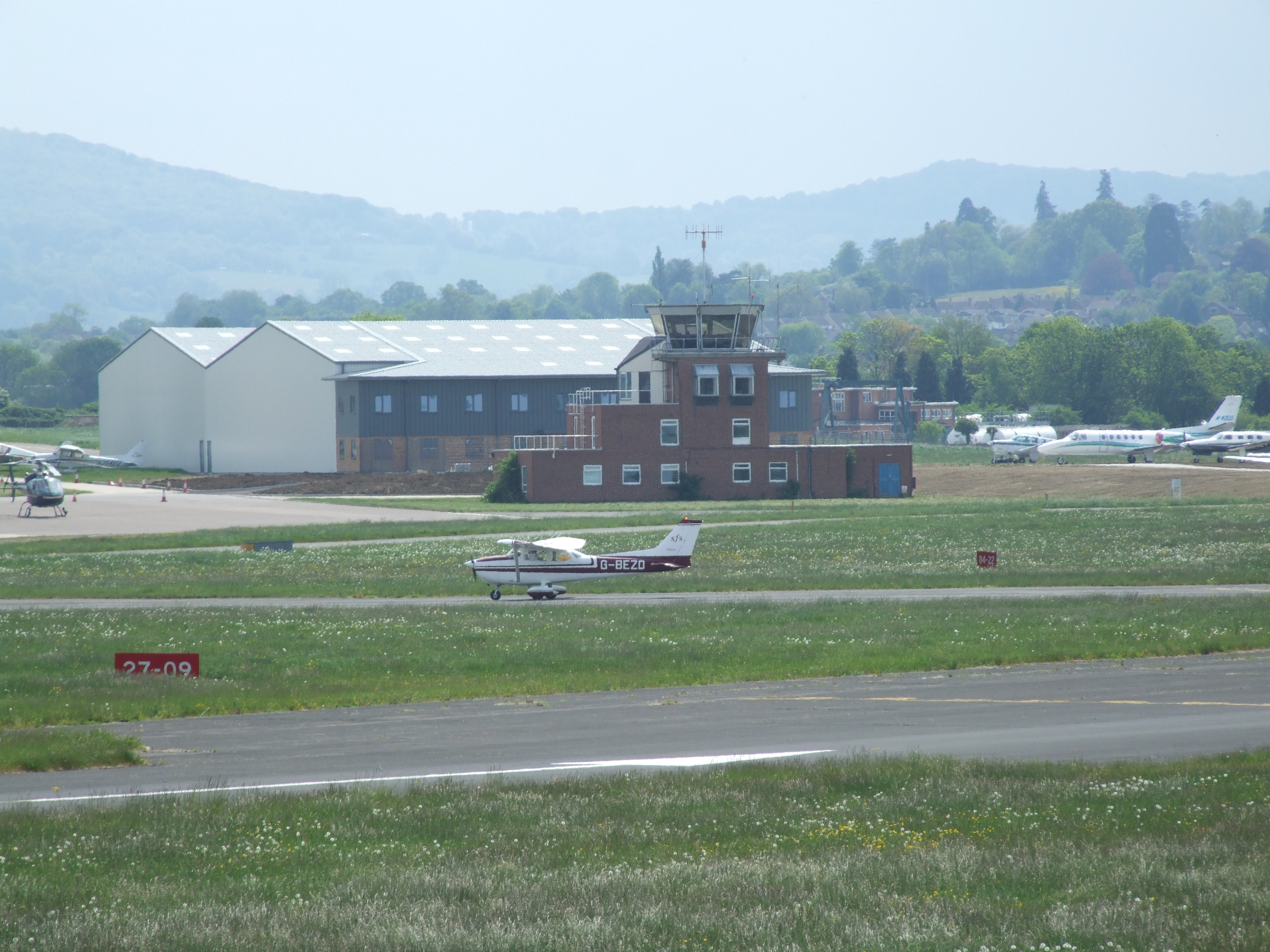
A Cessna 172 belonging to the Staverton Flying School taxiing in after landing; the control tower and part of the main apron are in the background

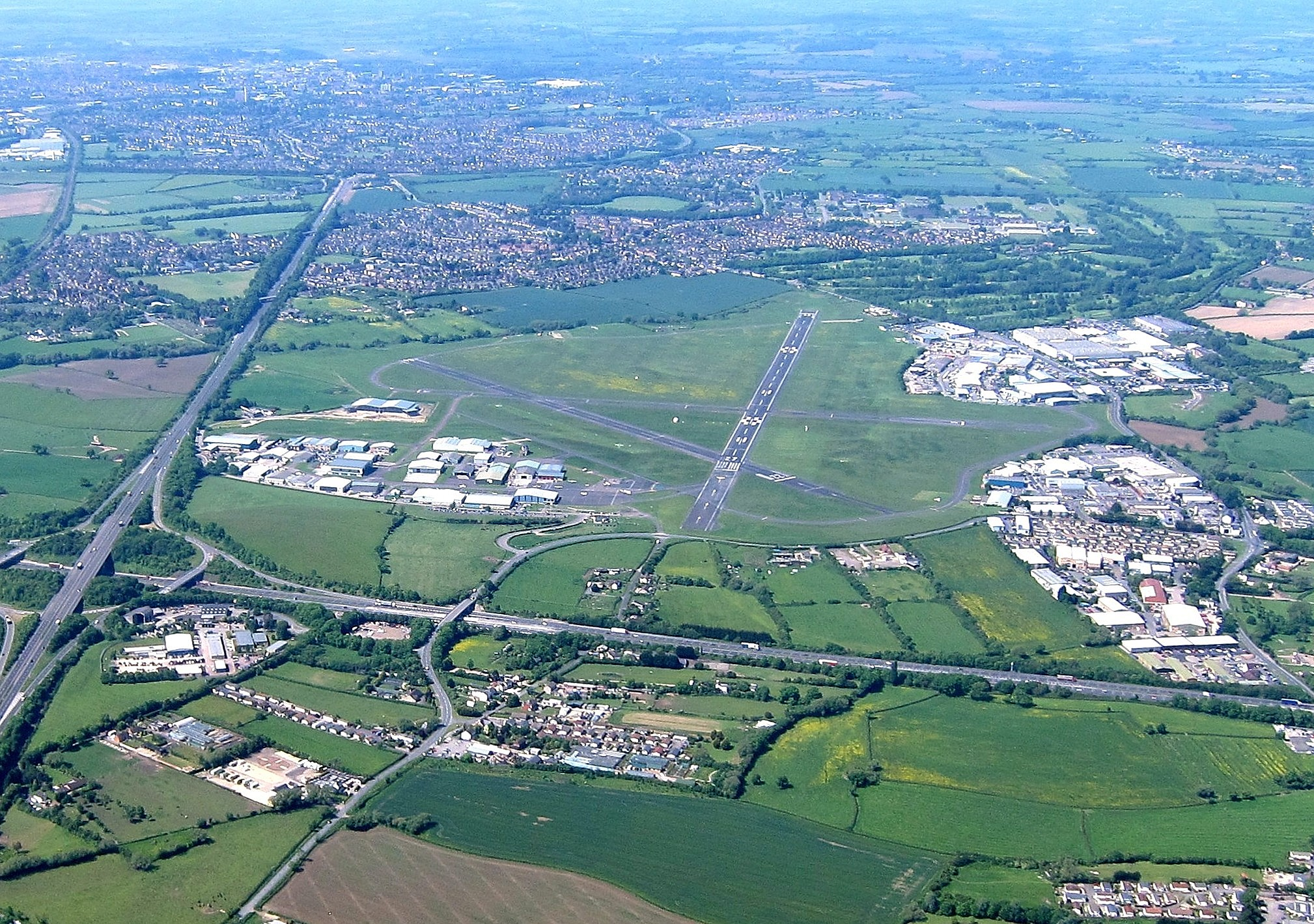
Gloucestershire airport in 2017, looking west: from left to right is the M5 motorway; crossing the M5 is the A40 Cheltenham to Gloucester.

Many of the flights to and from the airport are for business purposes, but there are also recreational flights and training flights.

The airport houses several flying clubs for private pilots including Bristol Aero Club, Cotswold Aero Club and the Staverton Flying School alongside commercial pilot training from Aeros and Skyborne Aviation. Specialist helicopter trainers JK Helicopter Training and Heli Air also provide gift/pleasure helicopter flights. People are able to undertake their pilot's licence training at the airport.

Also based at the airport is SimAir737 providing flight simulator facilities to professional pilots, private pilots and the general public through use of its upgraded Boeing 737-800NG fixed base simulator. Alongside SimAir is The Little Jet Company, which has a fleet of Citation Bravo and King Air 350 business jets that can be chartered around Europe. The airport also has its own Fixed Base Operator in the form of Weston Aviation.

The airport is home to The Aviator restaurant and bar. There is a live video camera, aimed on a bearing of 255 degrees, just south of due west.

== Airlines and destinations ==
The majority of Gloucestershire Airport's movements are operated by private aircraft.

Citywing previously flew a minimum of five weekly to the Isle of Man during the winter months and up to 25 times weekly during the summer peak season. The Jersey route was flown three times per month during the peak season between July and September, but was not operated during the winter months. This service ended in March 2017, after the airline was liquidated.

== Traffic statistics ==
Gloucestershire Airport Traffic Statistics
Year	Number of Passengers	Number of Aircraft Movements
1969	9,012	48,421
1970	7,563	44,831
1971	8,441	52,179
1972	8,035	55,030
1973	10,496	46,670
1974	11,479	41,942
1975	4,548	42,790
1976	7,337	39,564
1977	15,282	40,895
1978	17,774	37,929
1979	16,607	43,615
1980	9,833	45,689
1981	5,348	41,092
1982	5,029	42,639
1983	4,981	52,591
1984	3,527	46,492
1985	3,760	42,676
1986	3,285	52,044
1987	3,539	57,117
1988	3,274	69,696
1989	5,621	87,670
1990	4,794	94,813
1991	4,485	76,025
1992	9,646	66,566
1993	8,876	70,557
1994	3,427	70,485
1995	2,198	81,182
1996	1,938	76,385
1997	2,104	78,626
1998	2,246	84,636
1999	2,192	75,350
2000	2,038	82,334
2001	64	82,359
2002	195	80,168
2003	N/A	80,803
2004	N/A	90,285
2005	N/A	82,771
2006	166	83,453
2007	5,359	78,694
2008	20,156	76,755
2009	20,531	68,075
2010	16,533	67,788
2011	14,748	67,715
2012	15,292	73,762
2013	14,168	73,857
2014	15,172	73,687
2015	12,267	74,474
2016	12,365	83,329
2017	1,464	81,451
2018	N/A	78,022
2019	N/A	74,523
2020	N/A	53,336
2021	N/A	65,009
2022	N/A	60,020
2023	N/A	68,100
https://www.caa.co.uk/data-and-analysis/uk-aviation-market/airports/uk-airport-data, e.g. UK airport data 2023 -> Annual 2023 -> 'Table 01 Size of UK Airports' and 'Table 03 1 Aircraft Movements'; Data available under Creative Commons Zero.

== Events ==
On 14 November 2014, BBC Radio Gloucestershire and its listeners set a new world record for the longest line of cakes, to raise money for Children in Need. Volunteers around the region baked 14,392 cupcakes which were laid in a line at the airport. At about 16:45 GMT, an adjudicator from Guinness confirmed the breaking of the world record which now stands at 885.6 metres (2,906 ft) of cakes. The previous record of 606 metres (1,988 ft) was set in Colombia in 2013.
