= North West Parachute Centre =

Skydiving drop zone in Cark, Cumbria, England

The North West Parachute Centre is a BPA affiliated parachuting centre and skydiving drop zone at Cark, Cumbria.

The drop zone operates a PAC XL750 Turbine aircraft. The centre provides student training in the Ram Air Progression System, Accelerated Freefall and Tandem skydiving. The centre provides advanced coaching in formation skydiving and freefly.

== Deaths ==
Peter Shaw – May 2005
