= Staverton, Gloucestershire =

Village in Gloucestershire, England

Coordinates: 51°54′35″N 2°9′30″W

Staverton
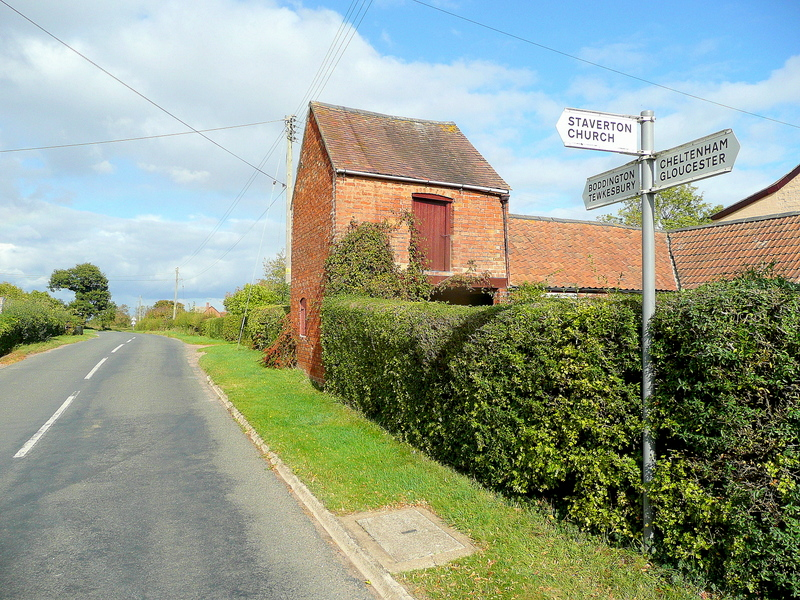
- Fingerpost at the centre of Staverton

- Location within Gloucestershire
- Population: 572 (2011 Census)
- District: Tewkesbury
- Shire county: Gloucestershire
- Region: South West
- Country: England
- Sovereign state: United Kingdom
- Post town: Cheltenham
- Postcode district: GL51
- Police: Gloucestershire
- Fire: Gloucestershire
- Ambulance: South Western
- UK Parliament: Tewkesbury

Staverton is a village between the city of Gloucester and the town of Cheltenham in Gloucestershire, England, in the borough of Tewkesbury. The population taken at the 2011 census was 572.

It is the location of Gloucestershire Airport, which was previously called Staverton Airport and RAF Staverton. It is the home of the Dowty Rotol and Messier-Dowty aircraft components factories. The airport is the largest general aviation airfield in South West England.
