= RAF Staverton =

Former RAF base, Gloucestershire

RAF Staverton
- Near Staverton, Gloucestershire in England

Site information
- Type: Royal Air Force Station
- Owner: Air Ministry
- Operator: Royal Air Force
- Controlled by: RAF Flying Training Command

Location
- Shown within Gloucestershire RAF Staverton (the United Kingdom)
- Coordinates: 51°53′39″N 002°10′02″W

Site history
- Built: 1936
- In use: 1936 - 1951
- Battles/wars: European theatre of World War II

Airfield information
- Elevation: 48 metres (157 ft) AMSL
Runways
Direction	Length and surface
00/00	Asphalt
00/00	Asphalt
00/00	Asphalt

Royal Air Force Staverton or more simply RAF Staverton is a former Royal Air Force station about 4 miles (6 km) west of Cheltenham, Gloucestershire, England. The station was used for training and operations from 1936 until the 1950s. The site is now Gloucestershire Airport.

== History ==
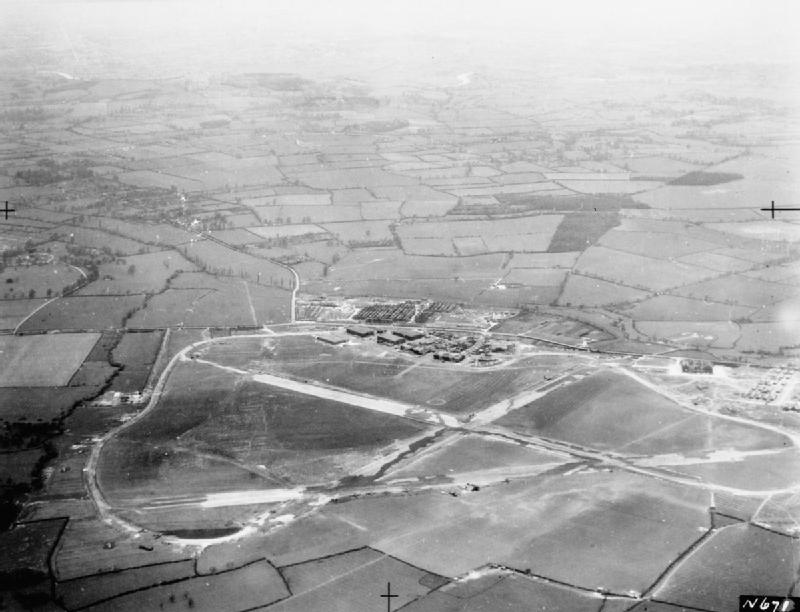
Aerial view in 1941

From 1931 there was an airfield near Down Hatherley, and plans were in place pre-war to develop the new site. The RAF took over the site as a training school on 16 July 1936 for training until August 1946. Flying training was conducted at the site on de Havilland Tiger Moths, but for the first 18 months, during construction, the practical element of the course had to be undertaken at the relief landing ground at RAF Worcester. No. 31 Elementary and Reserve Flying Training School was based at Staverton between 29 September 1938 and 3 September 1939.

During the Second World War a number of units and flights were based at the airfield including No. 44 Group Communication Flight RAF, which operated between 15 August 1941 and 9 August 1946. No. 6 Air Observers Navigation School RAF was also based at Staverton from 1 November 1939 until 17 January 1942.

Post-war, a number of small units and detachments used the airfield including a sub-site of No. 7 Maintenance Unit RAF between 4 June 1945 and 11 August 1953.

The Ministry of Aircraft Production Guard Dog School was formed in late 1942, located at Woodfold in Down Hatherley. In 1946 the unit, by now called the RAF Police Dog Training School, moved from Woodfold to Staverton. In February 1951, the School left Staverton and moved to RAF Netheravon.

The following units were also here at some point:

- No. 2 Elementary Flying Training School RAF became No. 6 Flying Instructors School (Supplementary) RAF became No. 6 Flying Instructors School RAF became No. 6 Flying Instructors School (Elementary) RAF became No. 2 Elementary Flying Training School RAF
- No. 6 Civil Air Navigation School RAF became No. 6 Air Observers Navigation School RAF became No. 6 Air Observers School RAF became No. 6 (Observers) Advanced Flying Unit RAF
- No. 7 Anti-Aircraft Co-operation Unit RAF
- No. 24 Group Communication Flight RAF
- A detachment of No. 225 Squadron RAF between 1 July 1940 and 29 July 1941 operating Westland Lysander IIs & IIIs

== Staverton Airport ==
In civilian hands, the site was known as Staverton Airport before changing its name to Gloucestershire Airport in 1993.
