= RAF Stormy Down =

Former Royal Air Force station in Vale of Glamorgan, Wales

RAF Stormy Down
- Pyle, Bridgend in Wales

Site information
- Type: Royal Air Force station
- Owner: Air Ministry
- Operator: Royal Air Force

Location
- Shown within Bridgend RAF Stormy Down (the United Kingdom)
- Coordinates: 51°30′15″N 003°40′13″W

Site history
- Built: 1939
- In use: 1939-1947

Airfield information
- Elevation: 97 metres (318 ft) AMSL
Runways
Direction	Length and surface
00	Grass field

Royal Air Force Stormy Down or more simply RAF Stormy Down is a former Royal Air Force station located near Pyle, Bridgend and opened in 1940.

== History ==
It was an armament training school for the Royal Air Force (RAF) then after they departed the French took the station over and later American forces were also stationed at 'Stormy'. Flying ceased in August 1944 due to the dangerous grass landing strip. However the airfield continued to be used for occasional private aircraft and a glider club for a number of years.

Stormy Down parented the RAF marine base at Porthcawl harbour. Once Stormy Down closed, the sea rescue unit at Porthcawl was parented by St Athan. Known as 1105 Marine craft unit, it had three 43 ft range safety launches. It was still operating in 1958. Stormy Down ceased use as a flying station because the chalk was collapsing due to the rain. Once the RAF personnel left it became a French Air Force and Naval Aviation Initial Training school. The airfield continued in use by an Air Training Corps gliding school and then a gliding club. There was only one aircraft landing there after the field shut and the pilot was lucky to escape prosecution. The only American involvement was the garaging of two Piper Cub reconnaissance aircraft from Porthcawl.

=== Units ===
The following units were at Stormy Down at some point:

- No. 2 Service Flying Training School RAF
- No. 3 Service Flying Training School RAF
- No. 7 Air Gunners School RAF
- No. 7 Air Observers School RAF
- No. 7 Bombing & Gunnery School RAF
- No. 7 Service Flying Training School RAF
- No. 9 Armament Training Station RAF
- No. 9 Service Flying Training School RAF
- No. 14 Operational Training Unit RAF
- No. 23 (French) Initial Training Wing
- No. 32 (French) Personnel Reception Centre
- No. 68 Gliding School RAF

== Current use ==
The site is now used by Cenin Renewables, as a research, development & production centre. The site is also the operating base for Bridgend Motorcycle Training Centre. The site is now an operational energy park, supplying green electricity to the local town Porthcawl. Stormy Down takes most of the food waste from South Wales into their food waste 3 mW anaerobic digestor which creates energy, heat and organic fertilizer for the local farmer. With the technologies on site, enough electricity is produced for the local town, Porthcawl with the technologies on site, a solar field of 735 kW, a 1.5 mW and 3.6 mW turbine and an ultra-low carbon cement factory.
