= RAF Strubby =

Former RAF station in Lincolnshire, England

RAF Strubby
- Strubby, Lincolnshire in England
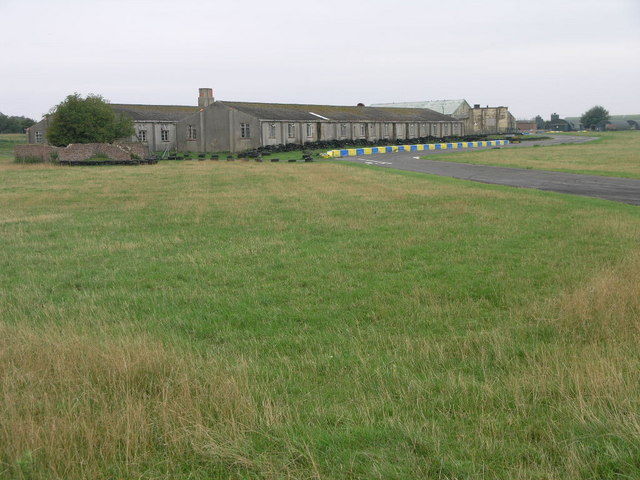
- An airfield building

Site information
- Type: Royal Air Force station
- Owner: Ministry of Defence
- Operator: Royal Air Force
- Controlled by: RAF Bomber Command

Location
- Shown within Lincolnshire RAF Strubby (the United Kingdom)
- Coordinates: 53°18′14″N 000°10′00″E

Site history
- Built: 1942
- In use: 1943 - 1972
- Battles/wars: European theatre of World War II

Airfield information
- Elevation: 12 metres (39 ft) AMSL
Runways
Direction	Length and surface
00/00	Asphalt
00/00	Asphalt
00/00	Asphalt

Royal Air Force Strubby or more simply RAF Strubby is a former Royal Air Force station 2.9 miles (4.7 km) north of Alford, Lincolnshire, and 8.6 miles (13.8 km) south east of Louth, Lincolnshire, England.

== History ==
=== Squadrons ===
Squadron	Equipment	From	To	To	Notes
No. 144 Squadron RAF	Bristol Beaufighter X	1 July 1944	3 September 1944	RAF Banff	
No. 227 Squadron RAF	Avro Lancaster I and III	5 April 1945	8 June 1945	RAF Graveley	
No. 280 Squadron RAF	Vickers Warwick I	1 May 1944	6 September 1944	RAF Langham	Detachment at RAF Thornaby
No. 404 Squadron RCAF	Beaufighter X	1 July 1944	3 September 1944	RAF Davidstow Moor	Detachment at RAF Davidstow Moor
No. 619 Squadron RAF	Lancaster I and III	28 September 1944	1 July 1945	RAF Skellingthorpe	

=== Units ===
- No. 381 Maintenance Unit RAF (MU)
- No. 382 MU
- No. 383 MU
- No. 384 MU
- Empire Air Armament School RAF
- RAF College of Air Warfare
- RAF Flying College
- No. 5 Group Anti-Aircraft School
- No. 12 Ground Controlled Approach Unit

== Current use ==
Woodthorpe Hall Caravan and Leisure Park currently occupies a small section of the site.

Lincs Aquatics trades from one of the old hangars.

Lincolnshire Gliding Club (formerly Strubby Gliding Club) has operated from the site since 1978. Celebrations to mark the club's 40th anniversary at Strubby were held in summer 2018. Gliders here make use of long runways of both grass and asphalt surfaces. There is also a small airfield with an asphalt runway on the northern side of the site.

== See also ==
- List of former Royal Air Force stations
