= John Dinsdale =

Officer in the Royal New Zealand Air Force

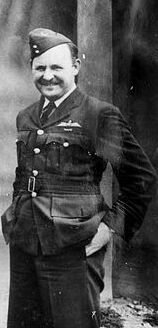
- Born: 24 April 1913; Christchurch, New Zealand
- Died: 2 January 1962 (aged 48); Taupō, New Zealand
- Military career
- Allegiance: New Zealand
- Branch: Royal Air Force (1938–1943); Royal New Zealand Air Force (1944–1947)
- Rank: Wing Commander
- Commands: No. 42 Squadron; No. 489 Squadron; No. 155 Wing
- Conflicts: Second World War
- Awards: Distinguished Service Order; Distinguished Flying Cross; Mention in Despatches

John Dinsdale, DSO, DFC (24 April 1913 – 2 January 1962) was a highly decorated New Zealand officer who served in the Royal Air Force's Coastal Command during the Second World War.

From Christchurch, Dinsdale gained a short service commission in the Royal Air Force (RAF) in 1938. Serving with No. 42 Squadron at the start of the Second World War, he flew in Coastal Command's anti-shipping operations in Norwegian waters and the North Sea. After a brief period of service with No. 489 Squadron, he commanded No. 42 Squadron, flying sorties in February 1942 during the RAF's efforts to prevent the passage of the German capital ships Scharnhorst and Gneisenau. He was awarded the Distinguished Flying Cross for this work. He returned to No. 489 Squadron as its commander in August 1943, and led it on anti-shipping operations until August 1944; his leadership was recognised with an award of the Distinguished Service Order. In the postwar period, Dinsdale worked for British Petroleum. He died in Taupō in 1962 at the age of 48.

== Early life ==
John Swire Dinsdale was born in Christchurch, New Zealand, on 24 April 1913. He went to school in Te Kuiti and for a time served in the Territorial Force. He also flew with the Te Kuiti Aero Club. In June 1938, he joined the Royal Air Force (RAF) on a short service commission. He was confirmed in his pilot officer rank in June 1939.

== Second World War ==
Serving with Coastal Command's No. 42 Squadron on the outbreak of the Second World War, Dinsdale flew Vickers Vildebeests torpedo bombers during the early stages of the conflict, before these aircraft were replaced with Bristol Beaufort torpedo bombers. In 1941, he achieved what was at the time a rare success in Coastal Command's anti-shipping campaign, when in August he flew a sortie to the Norwegian south-west coastline and successfully launched a torpedo at a merchant ship. Later in the month, Dinsdale, a flight lieutenant at the time, was posted to the newly formed No. 489 Squadron. Made up of mostly New Zealand flying personnel, this was training in Scotland on Beauforts but these aircraft were soon required for service in the Mediterranean and were replaced with Handley Page Hampden torpedo bombers.

=== Command of No. 42 Squadron ===
Later in 1941, Dinsdale was promoted to squadron leader and given command of No. 42 Squadron, which was still operating Beauforts. He led it during the Channel Dash, the breakout through the English Channel of the capital ships Scharnhorst and Gneisenau on 12 February 1942. Coastal Command squadrons, including Dinsdale's, mounted several torpedo attacks on the vessels as they traversed the channel. His aircraft was damaged during his attempt to launch its torpedo at the Gneisenau. The squadron was also involved in the efforts to intercept the heavy cruiser Prinz Eugen as it traversed the Norwegian coastline on 17 May 1942; during its sortie Dinsdale launched a torpedo at the ship but it missed and he was immediately set upon by five covering German fighters. He was able to evade them and return safely to base. The following month, in recognition of his services with No. 42 Squadron, he was Mentioned in Despatches. He was also awarded the Distinguished Flying Cross with the citation, published on 23 June, reading:

On 17th May, 1942, this officer led a formation of Beaufort aircraft in an attack on the "Prince Eugen." Despite heavy fire from the cruiser and accompanying destroyers, a most determined attack was carried out. Squadron Leader Dinsdale has completed many operational sorties, including an attack on the Scharnhorst and Gneisenau in the English Channel. His leadership and skill are of a high order.

— London Gazette, No. 35605, 23 June 1942

=== Anti-shipping campaign ===
In late August 1943, Dinsdale, now holding the rank of wing commander, returned to No. 489 Squadron as its commander. Over the following months, he oversaw the squadron's conversion from its outdated Hampdens to the modern Bristol Beaufighter torpedo fighter. This work was carried at Leuchars, where the squadron was based at the time. In January 1944 Dinsdale, his short service commission in the RAF at an end, transferred to the Royal New Zealand Air Force (RNZAF) as a squadron leader, although he retained his acting wing commander rank. His command became operational the same month and on its first sortie, carried out on 13 January, successfully attacked a 4,000 ton merchantman and smaller ships near Lister. One ship was sunk and others damaged. Then, along with the Australian No. 455 Squadron, also at Leuchars and equipped with Beaufighters, Dinsdale's squadron formed the Anzac Strike Wing.

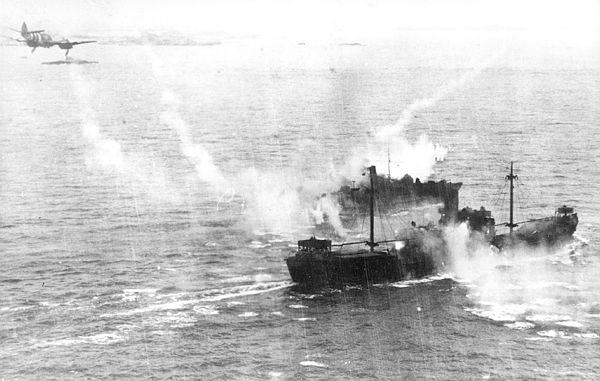
Beaufighters of the Anzac Strike Wing, attacking German shipping, July 1944

The Anzac Strike Wing became operational in March 1944, carrying out anti-shipping sorties along the Norwegian coast. With the invasion of Normandy imminent, the wing relocated to Langham, on the coast of Norfolk. From there, under the control of No. 16 Group, it targeted not only merchant shipping plying Dutch waters, but also sought out E-boats which could potentially disrupt the invasion fleet on D-Day. Independently of its wing operations, Dinsdale led the squadron in patrols of the Dutch coastline. In July, he was awarded the Distinguished Service Order (DSO). The DSO citation noted "...the morale and efficiency of his Squadron have reached a high standard under Acting Wing Commander Dinsdale's leadership". He relinquished command of No. 489 Squadron the following month, on 12 August.

Dinsdale subsequently became commander of Coastal Command's No. 155 Wing. In March 1946, he was appointed commander of No. 254 Squadron, but this was disbanded later that year, in October. The following month Dinsdale returned to New Zealand, with his wife and child, aboard the Moreton Bay and his active service in the RNZAF ended the following February. However he remained in the reserve of officers.

== Later life ==
Returning to civilian life, Dinsdale found employment with the New Zealand arm of British Petroleum and was sent for training in England. On his return, he worked as a marketing representative in Auckland. Then in July 1952 he became the manager of the Wellington branch of the company. He died suddenly on 2 January 1962 at Taupō. He was survived by his wife, who he had married in Scotland in 1942, and four children.
