= Anzac Strike Wing =

Royal Air Force formation of the Second World War

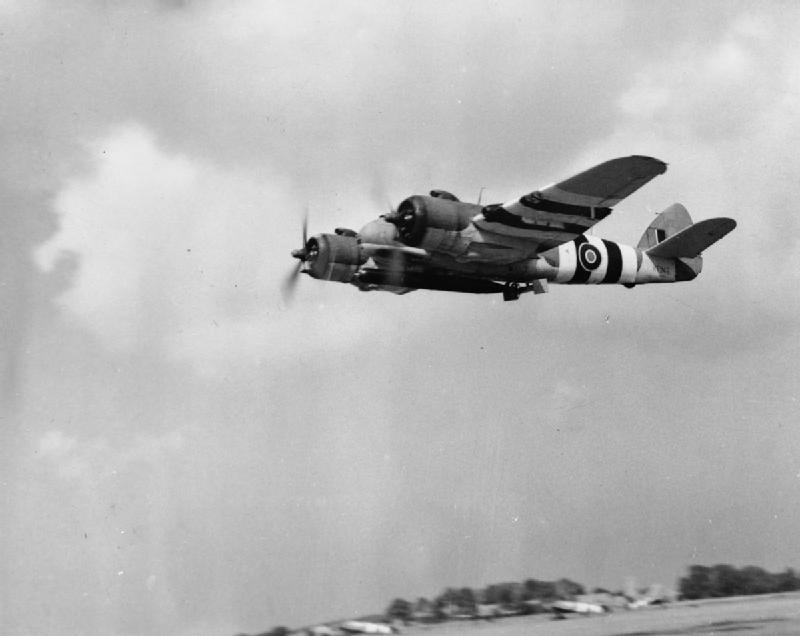
- A Beaufighter of No. 489 Squadron with a torpedo, setting out from Langham, Norfolk, on an anti-shipping strike
- Active: 1944–1945
- Country: United Kingdom
- Branch: Royal Air Force
- Role: Anti-Shipping
- Size: Wing
- Part of: No. 18 Group
- Engagements: Second World War

Aircraft flown
- Attack: Bristol Beaufighter heavy fighter

The Anzac Strike Wing was a former wing of the Royal Air Force, active during the final two years of the Second World War as part of Coastal Command's anti-shipping campaign in the North Sea. Also known as the Leuchars Wing, the Langham Wing, and the Dallachy Wing, after the stations from which it operated, the wing's constituent units were squadrons of the Royal Australian Air Force and the Royal New Zealand Air Force respectively.

== Background ==
Since 1940, the Royal Air Force's Coastal Command had carried out an anti-shipping campaign targeting cargo vessels carrying raw materials through the North Sea, between the Scandinavian ports and the German controlled ports in the Netherlands and Germany itself. However, its operations for the first years of the war were compromised with poor performing aircraft. By 1942, superior aircraft, in the form of the Bristol Beaufighter heavy fighter, were becoming available to Coastal Command. Based on experience gained in the Mediterranean, new tactics were devised for attacking shipping, involving the use of large formations of 30 or more aircraft, and these called for the formation of strike wings. The first of these, the North Coates Strike Wing, mounted its first sortie in November but it transpired further training was required. Once it resumed operations in April 1943, the wing immediately achieved good results. This led to the formation of further strike wings for deployment in Coastal Command's anti-shipping campaign.

== History ==
In October 1943, Article XV squadrons of the Royal Australian Air Force and the Royal New Zealand Air Force, No. 455 Squadron (RAAF), commanded by Jack Davenport, and No. 489 Squadron (RNZAF), commanded by John Dinsdale, were transferred to the RAF station at Leuchars to begin preparation and training as a strike wing. Both squadrons were units of Coastal Command and prior to their move to Leuchars, had been equipped with Handley Page Hampden torpedo bombers. These were not suitable for the tasks that the wing was expected to perform, particularly due to the speed differential between these aircraft and the faster fighters that would accompany them on their operations. Instead, they began to reequip and train with the Beaufighter. The New Zealanders used Beaufighters modified to carry torpedoes, known as Torbeaus, to target the ships while the Australians trained in an anti-flak role using the cannons of the Beaufighter.

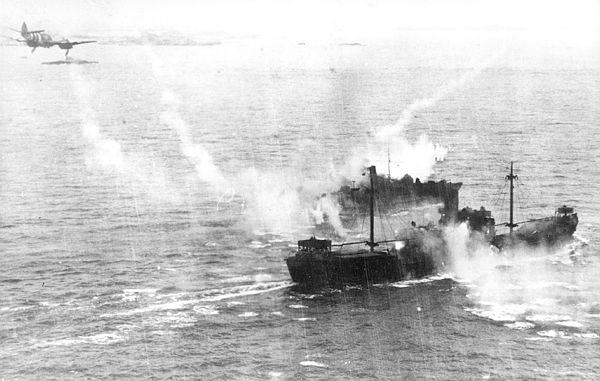
Beaufighters of the Anzac Strike Wing, attacking German shipping, July 1944

The combination of Australian and New Zealanders operating alongside each other evoked the Anzac spirit, and the strike wing became popularly known as the Anzac Strike Wing. In accordance with RAF practice, it was officially named the Leuchars Wing after the station at which it was based and was under the control of No. 18 Group.

The Anzac Strike Wing became operational in March but was involved in only one major operation that month, an attack on a convoy off the coast of southern Norway carried out on 6 March. This resulted in the sinking of two ships. The wing then relocated to Langham to become the Langham Wing, where it spent six months and achieved significant success. As D-Day approached and in the days following the Normandy landings, the wing carried out supporting operations but still performed in its strike role. On 15 June 1944, it achieved one of the greatest successes of Coastal Command's anti-shipping campaign. Flying with the North Coates Strike Wing, a convoy of 19 vessels was attacked near Ameland by a combined formation of 40 aircraft, with three sunk, including a cargo ship of 8,500 tons and a depot ship for E-boats. Ultimately, as the result of the anti-shipping campaign, the Germans were denied use of the lower North Sea.

In October, the Anzac Strike Wing moved north to Dallachy, in the northeast of Scotland. There it was joined by No. 144 Squadron, an RAF squadron, and No. 404 Squadron, a unit of the Royal Canadian Air Force, to become, officially, the Dallachy Wing. As a result of the extra squadrons, the Australian–New Zealand identity became somewhat dissipated. At Dallachy, operations were carried out towards the Scandinavian coastline, with much success.

In the final stages of the war, Nos. 455 and 489 Squadrons operated from Thornaby, intercepting German shipping trying to escape from Kiel. Its offensive operations ended with Germany's surrender on 7 May. Both squadrons disbanded within a matter of weeks.

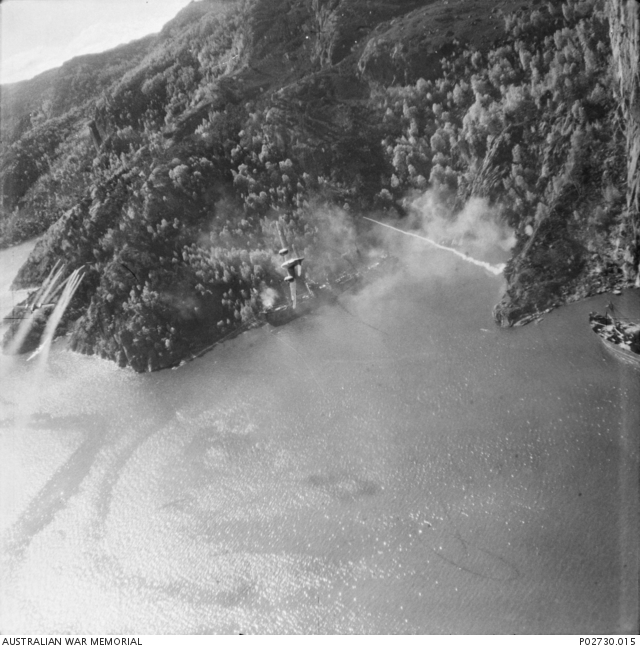
Beaufighters attacking German shipping in an unidentified Norwegian Fjord, January 1945
