= RAF Docking =

Former RAF station in Norfolk, England

RAF Docking
- Norwich, Norfolk in England

Site information
- Type: Royal Air Force satellite station
- Owner: Air Ministry
- Operator: Royal Air Force
- Controlled by: RAF Coastal Command * No. 16 Group RAF

Location
- Shown within Norfolk RAF Docking (the United Kingdom)
- Coordinates: 52°55′17″N 000°39′39″E

Site history
- Built: 1939/40
- In use: July 1940-1958
- Battles/wars: European theatre of World War II; Cold War

Airfield information
- Elevation: 64 metres (210 ft) AMSL
Runways
Direction	Length and surface
00/00	Grass
00/00	Grass
00/00	Grass

Royal Air Force Docking or more simply RAF Docking is a former Royal Air Force satellite station a few miles from Bircham Newton in Norfolk, England.

== History ==
It was a satellite airfield for the RAF Coastal Command station at RAF Bircham Newton and was mostly used for overflow from there.

A grass airfield, with eight blister hangars and one A1 hangar, was laid out soon after the outbreak of war and the first squadron to operate from there was No. 235 Squadron RAF using Bristol Blenheims for convoy escort and anti-shipping operations in the North Sea. These were then replaced by the Lockheed Hudson.

A meteorological observation unit No. 405 Flight of Bomber Command was set up as part of the effort to gain important weather information. When Coastal Command took over all the meteorological units this became No. 1401 (Met) Flight and received a greater variety of aircraft. As well as Blenheims it operated Spitfires, Gloster Gladiator biplanes and Hawker Hurricanes. These aircraft were all used to take measurements of temperature and humidity; from 40,000 ft downwards in precise areas. In August 1942 the Flight was made into a Squadron – No. 521 – with Hudsons, Handley Page Hampdens, de Havilland Mosquitos and Lockheed Venturas. The squadron's Mosquitos would operate deep into occupied Europe to take measurements over target areas; known as "PAMPA". In 1944 the squadron moved to the other satellite for Bircham Newton, RAF Langham

== Posted units ==
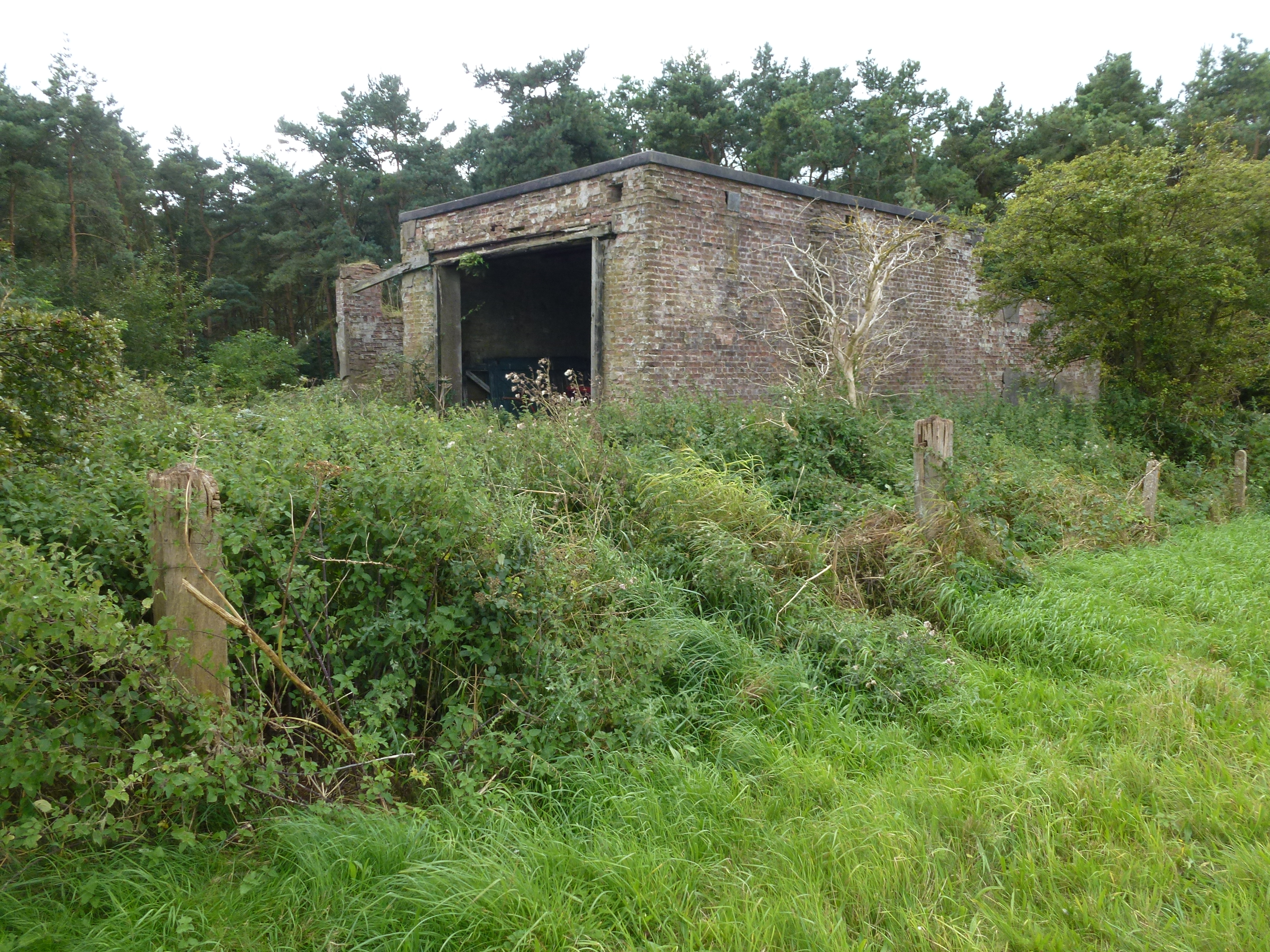

The following squadrons were here at some point:

- No. 53 Squadron RAF (1943)
- No. 143 Squadron RAF
- No. 221 Squadron RAF (1941-42)
- No. 225 Squadron RAF
- No. 235 Squadron RAF (1942)
- No. 254 Squadron RAF
- No. 268 Squadron RAF
- No. 288 Squadron RAF (1944)
- No. 304 Polish Bomber Squadron (1943)
- No. 407 Squadron RCAF
- No. 415 Squadron RCAF (1943-44)
- No. 502 (Ulster) Squadron AAF
- No. 521 Squadron RAF (1943-44)
- No. 524 Squadron RAF (1944)
- 812 Naval Air Squadron
- 855 Naval Air Squadron

Units

- No. 2 Armament Practice Camp RAF
- No. 22 Blind Approach Training Flight RAF (October 1941) became No. 1522 (Beam Approach Training) Flight RAF (October 1941 – April 1942)
- No. 27 Air Crew Holding Unit RAF
- No. 401 Meteorological Flight RAF (October 1941 – ?)
- No. 1401 Meteorological Flight RAF (August – September 1943)
- No. 1525 (Beam Approach Training) Flight RAF (July 1942 – ?)
- No. 1693 (General Reconnaissance) Flight RAF (May 1945)
- No. 2731 Squadron RAF Regiment
- No. 2749 Squadron RAF Regiment
- No. 2765 Squadron RAF Regiment
- Air Sea Rescue Training Unit RAF (October 1943)
- Warwick Training Unit RAF (June – July 1943)

== Current use ==
The site has reverted to farmland.

== See also ==
- List of former Royal Air Force stations
