= Bogmoor =

Village in Moray, Scotland

Coordinates: 57.6526043399°N 3.079140640284°W

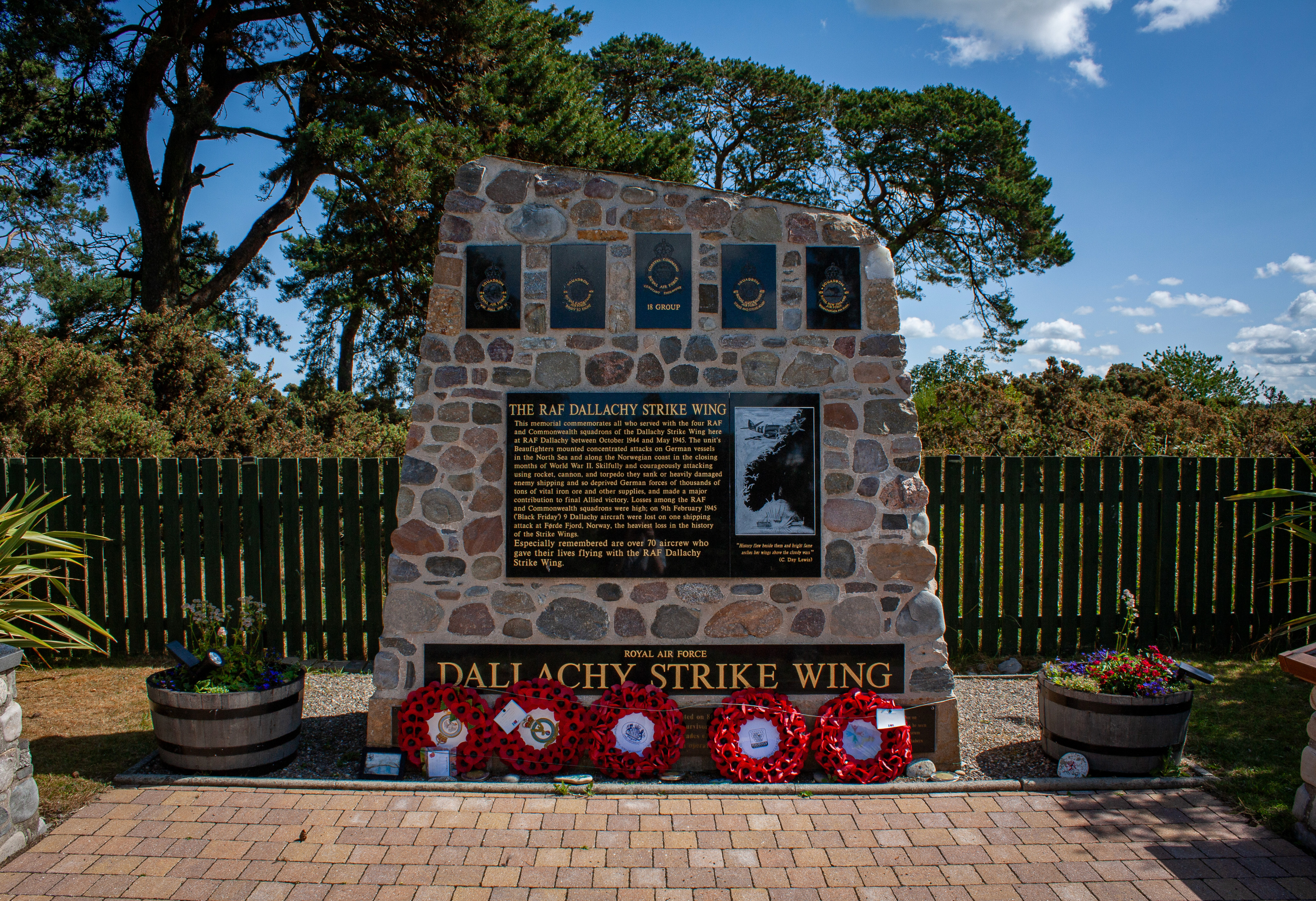
- Dallachy Strike Wing Memorial, located in Bogmoor

- Location within Moray
- Council area: Moray
- Lieutenancy area: Moray
- Country: Scotland
- Sovereign state: United Kingdom
- Police: Scotland
- Fire: Scottish
- Ambulance: Scottish

Bogmoor is a small village in Moray, Scotland located about 1.2 miles (2 kilometres) south-east of Spey Bay. It is situated on the east of the River Spey.

It is located next to the now-abandoned RAF Dallachy airfield, which was used frequently in the Second World War and was the site of a number of bombings. There is a memorial in the village dedicated to air crew and soldiers who lost their lives in the war.
