= No. 524 Squadron RAF =

- Active: 20 October 1943 – 7 December 1943; 7 Apr 1944 – 25 May 1945
- Country: United Kingdom
- Branch: Royal Air Force
- Part of: No. 15 Group RAF, Coastal Command (Oct 43 – Dec 43); No. 19 Group RAF, Coastal Command (Apr 44 – Jul 44); No. 16 Group RAF, Coastal Command (Jul 44 – May 45)

Insignia
- Squadron Codes: 7R (Apr 1944 – May 1945)

No. 524 Squadron was a Royal Air Force Coastal Command aircraft squadron that operated during the Second World War.

== History ==
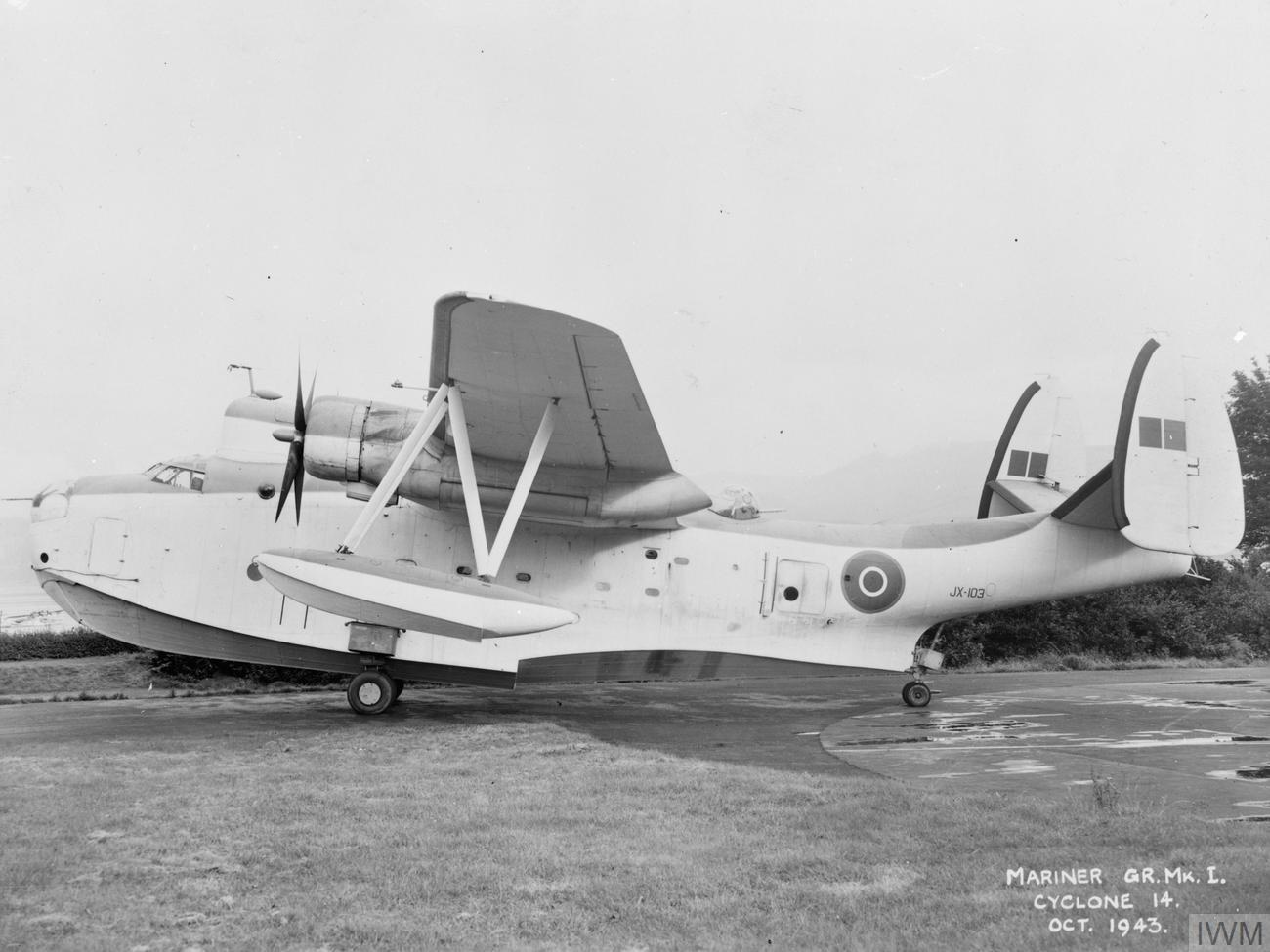
A 524 Sqn. Mariner I at Oban, Scotland, (October 1943)

No. 524 Squadron was formed at RAF Oban, Argyll and Bute in Scotland on 20 October 1943 to operate the Martin PBM Mariner flying boat. The squadron's role was to introduce the Mariner into RAF service. By the end of 1943 the aircraft was ready for operations but the RAF had decided not to operate the type and the squadron was disbanded on either 7 December 1943 or 29 January 1944.

The squadron was reformed at RAF Davidstow Moor on 7 April 1944 to operate the Vickers Wellington. The squadron carried out night operations of the French coast in preparation for D-Day, mainly attacking E-boats and submarines but also other shipping. It also provided escort to Coastal Command Beaufighters carrying out night strikes. After the Normandy Invasion the squadron moved to the east of England to RAF Docking in a similar role along the Dutch coast. The squadron also directed surface vessels to attack enemy shipping. With the end of the war approaching the squadron was disbanded on either 25 May 1945 or on 25 June 1945 at RAF Langham, the appointment of S/Ldr. Willis pointing to the latter.

== Aircraft operated ==
Aircraft operated by no. 524 Squadron RAF, data from
From	To	Aircraft	Version	Type
October 1943	January 1944	Martin Mariner	Mk.I	Twin-engined maritime patrol flying boat
April 1944	January 1945	Vickers Wellington	Mk.XIII	Twin-engined medium bomber
December 1944	May 1945	Vickers Wellington	Mk.XIV	Twin-engined medium bomber

== Squadron bases ==
Bases and airfields used by no. 524 Squadron RAF, data from
From	To	Base	Remark
20 October 1943	7 December 1943	RAF Oban, Argyll, Scotland	
7 April 1944	1 July 1944	RAF Davidstow Moor, Cornwall	
1 July 1944	23 July 1944	RAF Docking, Norfolk	
23 July 1944	17 October 1944	RAF Bircham Newton, Norfolk	Dets. at RAF Docking, Norfolk; RAF Langham, Norfolk and RAF Dallachy, Moray, Scotland (under No. 18 Group RAF, Coastal Command)
17 October 1944	25 May 1945	RAF Langham, Norfolk	Det. at RAF Dallachy, Moray, Scotland

== Commanding officers ==
Officers commanding no. 524 Squadron RAF, data from
From	To	Name
October 1943	December 1943	W/Cdr. W.E.M. Lowry
April 1944	July 1944	S/Ldr. A.W.B. Naismith
July 1944	May 1945	W/Cdr. R.G. Knott, DSO, DFC
May 1945	June 1945	S/Ldr. G.E. Willis, DFC
