= RAF Dallachy =

Former Royal Air Force station in Moray, Scotland

RAF Dallachy
- Elgin, Moray in Scotland
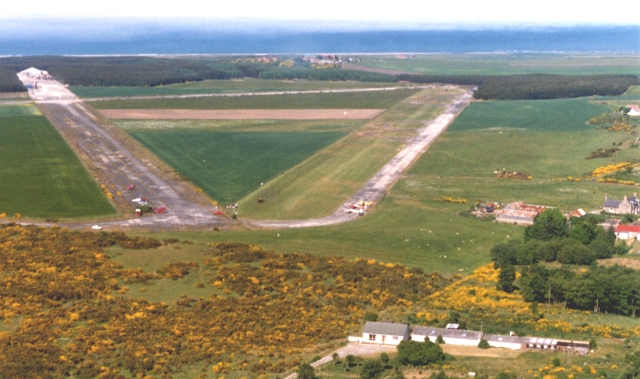
- Dallachy Airfield in 1987

Site information
- Type: Royal Air Force satellite station
- Owner: Air Ministry
- Operator: Royal Air Force
- Controlled by: RAF Coastal Command * No. 18 Group RAF

Location
- Location in Moray RAF Dallachy (the United Kingdom)
- Coordinates: 57.654°N 3.068°W

Site history
- Built: 1942
- In use: 1943-1945
- Battles/wars: European theatre of World War II

Airfield information
- Elevation: 76 metres (249 ft) AMSL
Runways
Direction	Length and surface
00/00	Concrete
00/00	Concrete

Royal Air Force Dallachy or more simply RAF Dallachy, is a former Royal Air Force satellite station situated east of Elgin, Moray, Scotland.

During the Second World War it was a fighter station, used by 18 Group RAF Coastal Command.

== History ==
Opened in March 1943, it was originally used as a training station by No. 14 (Pilots) Advanced Flying Unit RAF, using Airspeed Oxfords. In September 1943, it was reorganised for operational use by several squadrons, including No. 144 Squadron RAF, No. 404 Squadron RCAF,No. 455 Squadron RAAF, and No. 489 Squadron RNZAF as part of the Anzac Strike Wing. Towards the end of 1944, it was reorganised again to include No. 524 Squadron RAF with radar-equipped Vickers Wellingtons.

The airfield was closed in June 1945, becoming a Territorial Army training centre until 1958.

=== Units ===
Unit	Aircraft	Variant	From	To	To	Notes
No. 144 Squadron RAF	Bristol Beaufighter	X	23 October 1944	25 May 1945	Disbanded	
No. 281 Squadron RAF	Vickers Warwick	I	27 February 1944	7 February 1945	RAF Mullaghmore	As a detachment
No. 404 Squadron RCAF	Bristol Beaufighter de Havilland Mosquito	X VI	22 October 1944	3 April 1945	RAF Banff	
No. 455 Squadron RAAF	Bristol Beaufighter	X	20 October 1944	25 May 1945	Disbanded	
No. 489 Squadron RNZAF	Bristol Beaufighter	X	24 October 1944	16 June 1945	RAF Banff	
No. 618 Squadron RAF	de Havilland Mosquito	IV	September 1944	September 1944	Australia	
No. 14 (Pilots) Advanced Flying Unit	Airspeed Oxford		May 1943	September 1944	n/a	As Relief Landing Ground
No. 21 Air Crew Holding Unit	N/A					
No. 1542 (Beam Approach Training) Flight RAF	Airspeed Oxford		July 1943	August 1944	Disbanded	

== Current use ==
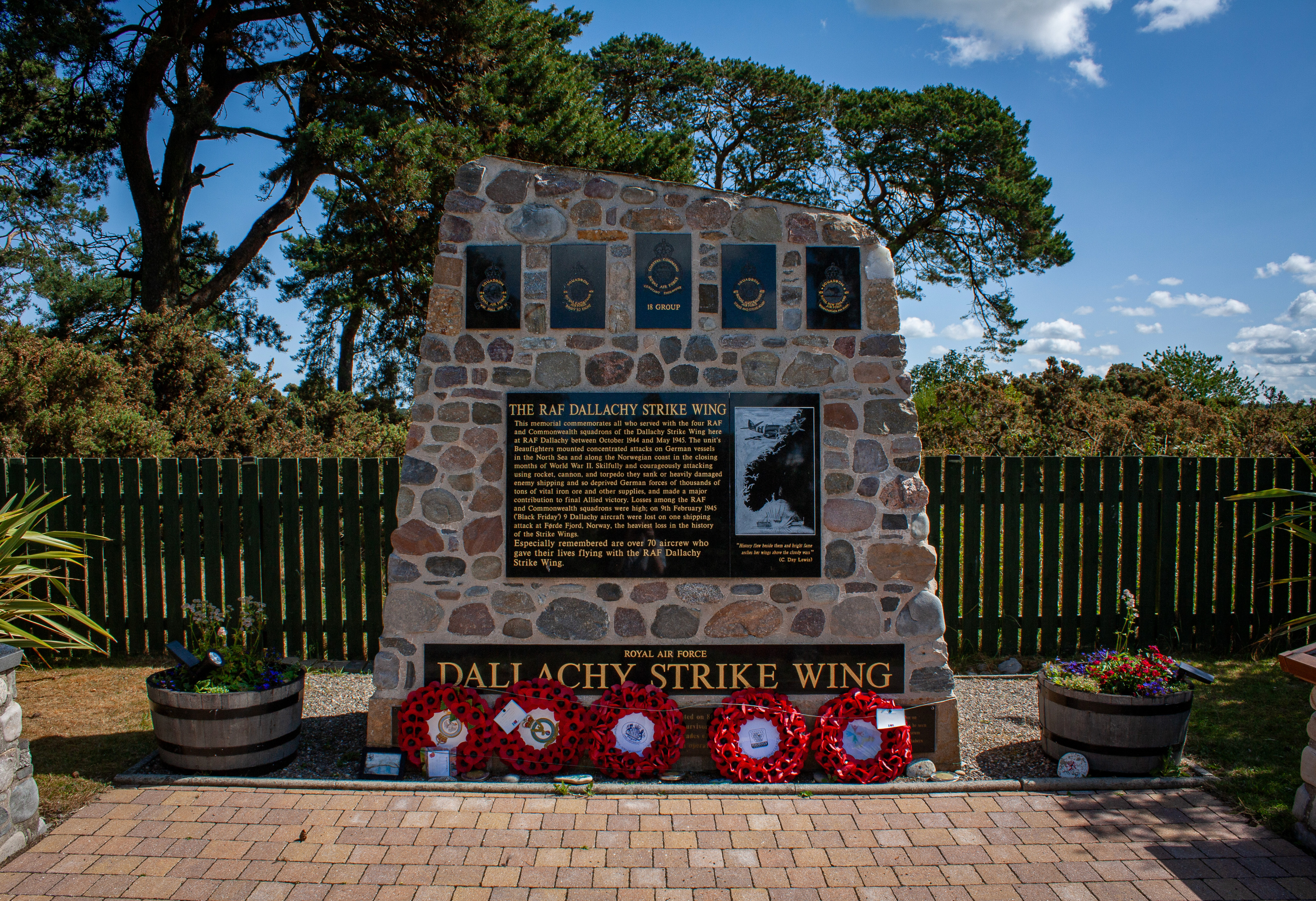
Dallachy Strike Wing Memorial, located in Bogmoor

The site is largely intact. However, most of the former airfield is now used by a waste recycling company. The control tower is in a ruinous state and no other buildings exist. Dallachy Aeromodellers, a radio control model flying club, use a section.

A memorial now stands in the nearby village of Bogmoor to remember the air crews and soldiers who lost their lives in the Second World War.
