= 1981 Queen's Birthday Honours (Australia) =

The 1981 Queen's Birthday Honours for Australia were appointments to recognise and reward good works by citizens of Australia and other nations that contribute to Australia. The Birthday Honours are awarded as part of the Queen's Official Birthday celebrations and were announced on 13 June 1981 in Australia.

The recipients of honours are displayed as they were styled before their new honour and arranged by honour with grades and then divisions i.e. Civil, Diplomatic and Military as appropriate.

== Order of Australia ==
=== Knight of the Order of Australia (AK) ===
==== General Division ====
Recipient	Citation	Notes
The Right Honourable Sir Garfield (Edward John) Barwick, GCMG	For service to the Australian Parliament, government and the law	

=== Companion (AC) ===
==== General Division ====
Recipient	Citation	Notes
Sir John (Laurence) Knott, CBE	For service to industry and the community	
Keith William Steel, OBE	For service to industry	

=== Officer (AO) ===
==== General Division ====
Recipient	Citation	Notes
John Hamilton Andrews	For service to the architecture	
Dr Percy Raymond Begg	For service to dentistry, particularly in the field of orthodontics	
Hugh Reskymer Bonython, DFC AFC	For service to the arts	
Murray Goulburn Madden Bourchier	For service to the diplomatic corps	
Mac Brunckhorst	For service to banking	
Edward John Connellan, CBE OBE	For service to the community and aviation	
Jack Napier Davenport, DSO DFC GM	For service to industry	
Laurence Desmond Draper, QPM	For service to the South Australian Police Force, particularly as Commissioner	
Sydney Stephen Dunn	For services to education	
John Keith Edwards	For service to industry and education	
Dr Alexander MacDonald Fraser	For service to education	
Robert Donald Hill-Ling	For service to industry	
Herman Diederik Huyer	For service to industry and to the community	
Kenneth Thomas Jenkins	For service to the disabled	
Charles Wooller Marshall	For service to the mining industry	
Professor Donald William McElwain, ED	For service to medicine, particularly in the field of psychology	
William Norman Morrison	For service to industry and to the community	
The Honourable Justice John Flood Nagle	For service to the community and to education	
Ivan Edgar Newnham, MBE	For public service to industry	
Francis John Owen Ryan, ISO	For public service in the field of corporate affairs	
Gilbert Frederick Seaman, CMG	For public service	
Professor Julius Stone, OBE	For service to law, particularly in the field of international law	
Dr Margaret Ada Sutherland, OBE	For service to music	
Maurice Carmel Timbs	For public service	

==== Military Division ====
Branch	Recipient	Citation	Notes
Navy	Rear-Admiral David Willoughby Leach, CBE MVO	For service to the Royal Australian Navy, particularly as Flag Officer commanding H M Australia Fleet and as Chief of Naval Personnel	
Army	Major-General Phillip Harvey Bennett, DSO KBE	For service to the Australian Defence Force, particularly as Chief of the Defence Force	
Air Force	Air Vice-Marshal Henry Alfred Hughes, DFC	For service to the Royal Australian Air Force, particularly as Chief of Air Force Material	

=== Member (AM) ===
==== General Division ====
Recipient	Citation	Notes
Neville Francis Amadio, MBE	For service to music	
Louis Athol-Shmith	For service to photography	
Emeritus Professor Mervyn Neville Austin	For service to education	
Bertram Charles Ballard	For service to the public service as a diplomatic representative	
Kevin Charles Bartlett	For service to the sport of Australian football	
Luciano Bini	For service to migrant welfare	
Norman Joseph Campbell	For service to industrial relations	
Ralph Gordon Conley	For service to the aviation industry	
Helen Craven Crisp	For service to education	
Sydney Page Crosland	For service to journalism	
Margaret Isabel Day	For service to the performing arts	
The Honourable Renfrey Curgenven De Garis	For service to the community and to parliament and government	
Rosalind Janet Denny	For service to nursing	
John Stuart Dowie	For service to the arts as a sculptor and painter	
James Heward Earle	For service to architecture	
William John Eason	For service to education	
Brother Ethelred Alan Nestor Ferguson	For service to education	
Richard Batten Gall	For service to industry	
George Andrew Gray, DFC	For service to education, particularly in the field of psychology	
James Patrick Hagan	For service in the fiend of Aboriginal welfare	
Harry Oswald Hall	For service to the building industry	
Dr Donald Graham Hamilton	For service to medicine, particularly in the field of paediatrics	
Major Colin Alistair Harper, MBE	For service to the community	
Lorna Ruby Hausler	For service to the community	
James Charles Houghton	For service to industry	
David Neil Ireland	For service to literature	
Donald Isaacs	For service to industry and to the community	
Freda Elizabeth Jacob	For service to the disabled	
Colin Frederick Jacobsen	For service to the entertainment industry	
Charles Thomas Kearney	For service to the community	
Rabbi John Simon Levi	For service to religion	
Walter John Lewer	For public service	
Marie Lenore Lowndes	For service to nursing	
Wallace Vivian McKensey	For service to engineering	
Hilarie Clare Moore, MBE	For service to disabled children	
Howard Charles Morton	For service to the prevention and control of tuberculosis	
Francis Joseph Murphy	For service to the sport of diving	
Dr Stephen Murray-Smith	For service to education and to literature	
Robyn Anne Nevin	For service to the performing arts	
Harold Charles Ogilvie	For service to the community	
John Galloway Painter	For service to music	
Peter Allen Powditch	For service as a painter and sculptor	
Dr Peggy Elizabeth Roberta Read	For service in the field of animal welfare	
Dr Joan Margaret Redshaw	For service to the community	
George Leslie Clarence Rees	For service to literature	
Edward Francis Sandbach	For public service	
Dr Eric Baldwin Sims	For services to medicine, particularly in the field of paediatrics	
Ronald Nathan Stone	For service to local government and to the community	
The Honourable Joe Slater Thompson	For service to trade unionism	
Geoffrey Alan Vincent	For service to the accounting profession	
Donald Percival Williams, KStJ	For service to the community	
James Hardy Wilton	For service to banking	
Joan Merle Woodberry	For service to literature and to education	
Dr Robin George Woods	For service to dentistry	
Charles Arthur Noel Young	For service to primary industry	

==== Military Division ====
Branch	Recipient	Citation	Notes
Navy	Commander Anne Lorraine Briggs	For service to the Royal Australian Navy	
Navy	Captain Thomas Alfred Dadswell	For service to the Naval Material Division, particularly as Aircraft Carrier Project Director	
Army	Lieutenant Colonel Frederick William Maxwell Bond	For service to the Army Reserve	
Army	Lieutenant Colonel Geoffrey David Carter	For service to the Australian Army in the field of air defence	
Army	Lieutenant Colonel Michael Francis Ekman	For service to the Australian Army in Field Force planning and organisation	
Army	Lieutenant Colonel Maxwell Martin Flohr	For service to the Army Reserve	
Army	Colonel Philip Michael Jeffery, MC	For service to the Australian Army in the formation of the Special Action Force	
Army	Lieutenant Colonel Jeremy Hepworth Taylor, MC	For service to the Royal Australian Infantry Corps	
Air Force	Chaplain Mervyn Steve Box	For service to the Royal Australian Air Force as the Senior Chaplain, Laverton	
Air Force	Wing Commander Eric John Kluukeri	For service to the Royal Australian Air Force, particularly as Commanding Officer of Central Photographic Establishment	
Air Force	Group Captain Norman Robin Wade, MBE	For services to the Royal Australian Air Force, particularly as the commanding Officer of No 478 Squadron.	
Air Force	Wing Commander Lynton Thomas Winn	For service to the Royal Australian Air Force, particularly as Commanding Officer of No 11 Squadron	

=== Medal (OAM) ===
==== General Division ====
Recipient	Citation	Notes
Lawrence James Anderson	For service to the public service	
Betty Maureen Anderson	For service to the nursing	
Tomas Andrews	For service to the sport of orienteering	
Ronald Naish Bailey	For service to the community and local government	
Albert Abraham Baker	For service to the community	
Amy Storey Baldwin	For service to the community	
William John Barker	For service to the community and local government	
David John Barratt	For service to primary industry	
Louis John Benaud	For service to the Public Service	
Margaret Mercer Blackburn	For service to commercial education	
Enid Ross Bowman	For service to conservation	
Arthur James Brissett	For service to local government	
Hector George Brooks	For service to primary industry	
Douglas Haig Bruce	For service to the welfare of ex-service personnel	
Francis Joseph Bryant	For service to the sport of cricket	
Richard John Bryant	For service to the sport of cricket	
Valma Burrows	For service to child welfare	
Ian Alexander Cameron	For service to the Public Service	
Henry Francis Cayley	For services to bridge	
Dr Archibald Frederick George Cornelius Christie	For service to community medical welfare	
Charles James Clifford	For service to the Public Service and the community	
Nola Edith Colefax	For service to the Theatre of the Deaf	
Ruth Emily Gwendoline Cooper	For service to nursing	
Clifford Douglas Cordon	For service to the community	
Frederick Sperry Coventry	For service to the wool industry	
Sybil Mary Frances Craig	For service as an artist	
Heather Bembrick Crosby	For service to the community	
Leslie Howard Cross	For service to the sport of billiards and snooker	
Frederick Francis De Saxe	For service to the legal profession as a barrister's clerk	
Jacqueline Mary Theresa Deveril	For service to children's welfare	
Robert William Doyle Devlin	For service to local government	
Isabel Helen Dillon	For service to the Public Service	
John Fletcher Elliott	For service to medicine, particularly in the field of optometry	
Owen Rowland Evans	For service to conservation	
Lolita Farmer	For service to migrant welfare	
Florence Roma Field	For service to the community	
Sydney John Fisher, QPM	For service to the community	
Sam Fiszman	For service to the community	
Dr James Aloysius Flaherty	For service to the community and to local government	
Rosetta Flynn	For service to the community	
Lloyd George Foord	For service to the community	
Doris Orr Ford	For service to the community	
Graeme Lindsay Gaul	For service to the community in the field of youth welfare	
Annibale Gaetano Giuffre	For service in the field of migrant welfare	
Margaret Ipsa Gleeson	For service to local government and to the community	
Sister Mary Ursula Grachan	For service to education	
John Joseph Grumley	For service to the community and to band music	
Brian Patrick Harford	For public service	
Charles Artlett Harris	For service to the sport of cricket	
Shirley Kathleen Anne Haslem	For service to welfare, particularly through the New South Wales Council for the Mentally Handicapped	
Thelma Anne Hatfield	For service to the community	
Nancye Lee Hayes	For service to the performing arts	
Donald Southwell Herborn	For public and community service in Papua New Guinea	
Captain Charles Nelson Hill	For service to the aviation industry	
Francis Vincent Holden	For service to the community and to local government	
Winifred Gladys Hooper	For service to the community	
Lorna Ellen Hosking	For service to the community	
Colin Richard James	For service to the community	
Kenneth Eric Johnson	For service to special education, particularly in the field of specific learning difficulties	
Vivian Thomas Judd	For service to local government and to the community	
Colin Charles James Kelly	For service to Public Service	
Albert Leonard Kuipers	For service to the community	
Pastor Frederick Kummerow	For service to religion and to the community	
Reginald Clive Lane	For service to the sport of rugby football	
James (Yami) Lester	For service in the field of Aboriginal welfare	
Barry Graham Lindner	For service in the field of Aboriginal welfare	
Jack Wilson Littler	For service to the community	
Keith Kenneth Lowe	For service to the community	
James Fraser Macdonald	For service to primary industry and to the community	
Marie Therese Maidment	For service to the disabled	
Barbara Berrima Manning	For service to the theatre	
Reverend Keith Henderson Marr	For service to religion	
John Curtis Marsh	For service to the community	
Horace Hayden Martin	For service to the community of Swan Hill	
Linda Mary Elizabeth McBurney	For service to the community	
Roy Edward McDonnell	For service to medicine through the invention and design of technical equipment	
Malcolm Paterson McPherson	For service to local government and to the community	
Arthur Forrest McRobbie	For service to the sport of basketball	
Roy William Mills	For service to the community	
Bonifacius Casimirus Minius	For public service in the field of plant propagation	
Barbara Jessie Misson	For service to the community	
Keith Raymond Morris	For service in the field of Aboriginal welfare	
Alison Moss	For service to nursing	
John William Moyses	For service to local government and to the community	
Frederick Walter Napier	For service to athletics	
Rita Grace Nassar	For service to handicapped children	
Brian Arthur Newton	For service to the disabled	
Dulcie Laura Noonan	For service to the community	
Francesco Oliveri	For service to local government and to the community	
Robert John Padula	For service to short wave radio	
Albert Alexander Lyle Pattison	For service to the community	
Robert Wilson Payen	For service to the sport of greyhound racing	
Derek Van Halen Pendleton	For service in the field of health administration	
James Edward Percey	For service to local government and to the community	
Thomas James Peters	For service to the motor trading industry	
Dr Sydney James William Player	For service to medicine	
Robert Norman Prior	For service to the field of health insurance	
Lionel Norman Rackley, DFC AE	For service to the disabled	
Clytie Louise Rannard	For public service	
Edwin Charles Renton	For service to medicine, particularly as a chiropodist	
John Reynolds	For service as a writer and historian	
Elizabeth Mary Robb	For service to the disabled	
Raymond Errol Roberts	For service in the field of youth welfare	
William James Robertson	For service to local government and to the community	
Sylvester Robert Robinson	For service to local government and to the community	
Ellen Alma Clarice Robinson	For service to the disabled	
Eric Joseph Roughana	For service to the timber industry and to the community	
Frederick Joseph Royal	For service to band music	
William Denis Ryan	For service to trade unionism	
Allen Edward Schafer	For service to the sport of tennis	
MacGregor Schulz	For service to primary industry	
Colin Purdom Scott	For service to local government	
Patrick Edward Shelly	For service to local government and to the community	
Joshua Shilkin, ED	For service to industry	
Hector Allan Skidmore	For service to local government and to the community	
David Douglas Smith	For service to the community	
William David Smith	For service to the welfare of ex-service personnel	
Harold Albert Leonard Stark	For service to local government and to the community	
Julian Ferdinand Stefani	For service to the community	
Walter William Stone	For service to literature	
Raymond Wilton Theodor Suess	For service to the welfare of ex-service personnel	
Jack Sweet	For public service and for service to the community	
Major Alan Delpah Taylor	For service to the community of Ballarat	
Hazel Joyce Tinley	For public service and for service to the community	
Thomas Harris Arthur Titley, MC	For service to local government and to the community	
Samuel Leonard Lancelot Trenwith	For service to band music	
Ruth Edith Tuck (SMITH)	For service as an art teacher and as an artist	
Margaret June Tucker	For public service	
Clifford Taylor Turnbull	For service in the field of youth welfare	
Alan Skelton Ward	For service to the sport of cricket	
Maurice Adrian Webb	For service to the sport of surf life saving	
Edward Louis Weidner	For service to the sport of rugby football	
Daniel George White, OBE	For service to the sport of surf life saving	
Eudora Mary Wilkshire	For public service	
Percy Williams	For service to local government	
Althea Mary Williams	For service to the disabled, particularly through the development of Riding for the Disabled	
David Wiskar	For service to the welfare of ex-service personnel	
Walter Allan Wood	For service to the community	

==== Military Division ====
Branch	Recipient	Citation	Notes
Navy	Warrant Officer John Richard Aaron	For service to the Royal Australian Navy School of Training Technology and Naval training in general	
Navy	Warrant Officer Peter Lloyd Frost	For service to the Royal Australian Navy, particularly as Wardroom Mess Manager, HMAS Harman	
Navy	Warrant Officer Gary Neville Jackson	For service to the Royal Australian Navy, particularly as an instructor at Great Lakes Training Centre	
Navy	Warrant Officer Christopher Nicholas Nicolaides	For service to the Royal Australian Navy, particularly as Stores Officer of HMAS Stirling	
Army	Warrant Officer Class Two Evalds Erglis	For service to the Army Reserve	
Army	Warrant Officer Class One Keith Kevin Hunter	For service to the Australian Army in the Stores Procurement field	
Army	Warrant Officer Class Two Robert Leslie Rowley	For service to the Royal Australian Survey Corps	
Army	Warrant Officer Class One Stephen Alan Smith	For meritorious service with the Australian Army, in the field of personnel management	
Army	Warrant Officer Class Two James Edward Smithers	For service to Army Reserve Recruiting	
Army	Warrant Officer Class Two Douglas Alexander Thoresen	For service to the Australian Army in the field of military music	
Air Force	Warrant Officer Murray Dennis Johnson	For service as a Warrant Officer Engineer at no 2 squadron, Royal Australian Air Force	
