= RAF Thornaby =

Former Royal Air Force base in the North Riding of Yorkshire, England

RAF Thornaby
- Thornaby-on-Tees, North Yorkshire in England
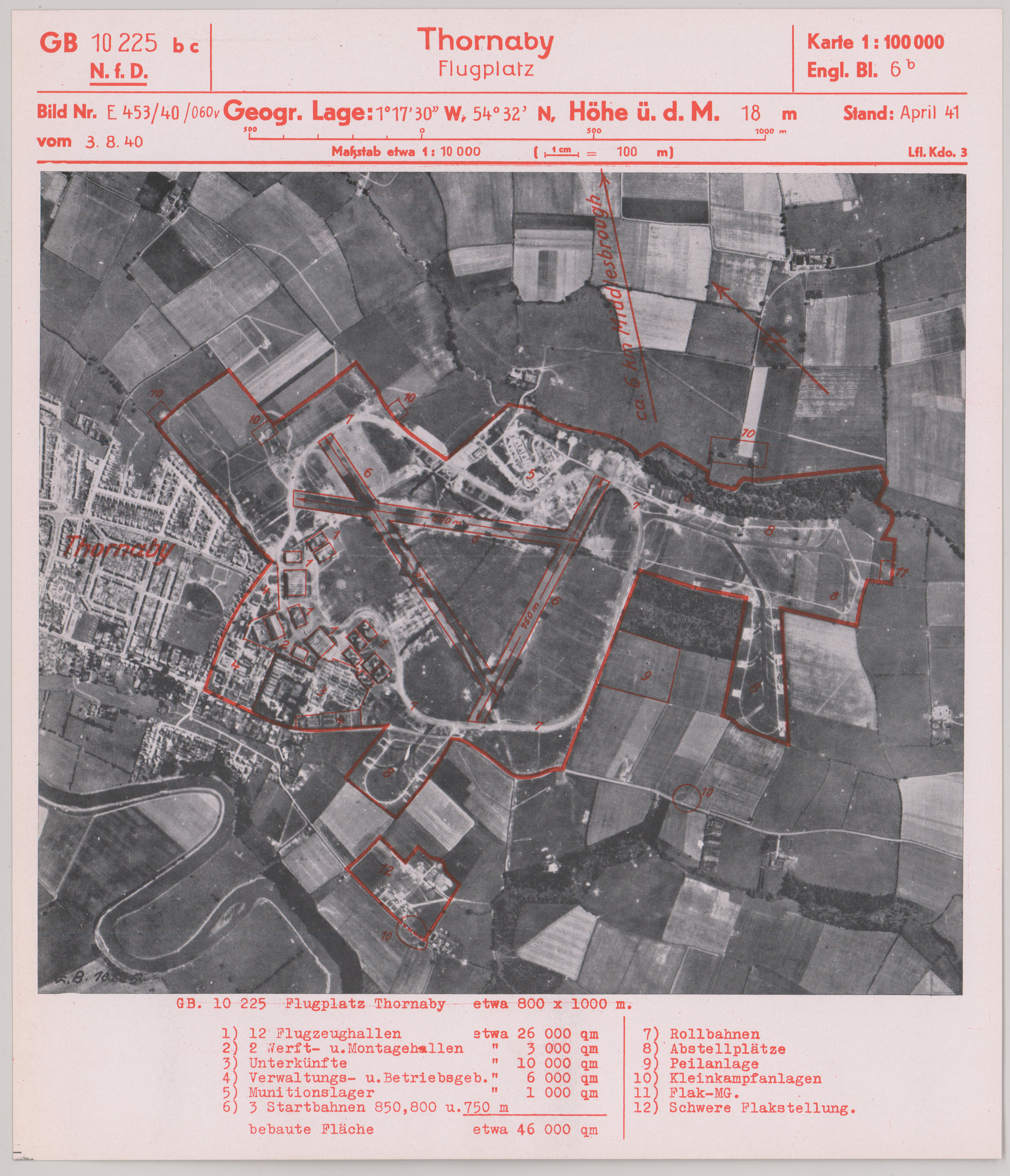
- RAF Thornaby on a target dossier of the German Luftwaffe, 1941

Site information
- Type: Royal Air Force station
- Owner: Air Ministry
- Operator: Royal Air Force
- Controlled by: RAF Coastal Command (1939-) * No. 17 Group RAF; RAF Fighter Command * No. 12 Group RAF

Location
- Shown within North Yorkshire RAF Thornaby (the United Kingdom)
- Coordinates: 54°32′00″N 01°18′00″W
- Grid reference: NZ455163

Site history
- Built: 1929
- In use: 1929 - 1 October 1958
- Battles/wars: European theatre of World War II; Cold War

Airfield information
- Elevation: 18 metres (59 ft) AMSL
Runways
Direction	Length and surface
04/22	1,807 metres (5,928 ft) Asphalt
10/28	1,277 metres (4,190 ft) Asphalt
17/35	1,282 metres (4,206 ft) Asphalt

Royal Air Force Thornaby, or more simply RAF Thornaby, is a former Royal Air Force station located in the town and borough of Thornaby-on-Tees, in the North Riding of Yorkshire, England. Fighter Command, Bomber Command and Coastal Command all operated from the base over its history, but its stint under Coastal Command is what the base was notable for, particularly in the air-sea rescue environment and the development of the Thornaby Bag. This was an emergency bag dropped to downed aircrew at sea and contained food, cigarettes and drink.

== History ==
The aerodrome was officially opened on 29 September 1929, although flying in Thornaby dates back to 1912 when Gustav Hamel used the Vale Farm for a flying display. Subsequently, the Royal Flying Corps used the same fields as a staging post between Catterick and Marske Aerodrome between 1914 and 1918. In 1920, the government purchased 50 acres (20 ha) of farm land from Thornaby Hall and developed the site.

The first squadron to occupy the new airfield was No. 608, who were formed here as No. 608 County of York (North Riding) Squadron on 17 March 1930, under the command of Flying Instructor, Squadron Leader William Howard-Davies, and operating Westland Wapitis and Avro 504Ns. No 608 Squadron were the first of the three Yorkshire based auxiliary flying units to be formed, the others being 609 (West Riding) squadron at RAF Yeadon and 616 (South Yorkshire) Squadron at RAF Doncaster.

Between March 1936 and July 1937 Thornaby was No. 9 Flying Training School RAF, the stations first regular Royal Air Force unit. The Squadron Commander was C.H. Elliot-Smith with Squadron Leader David D'Arcy Alexander Greig (1900–1986) as CFI who had been a pilot with the RAF's High Speed Flight and who had taken part in the 1929 Schneider Trophy. On 14 January 1937, No. 608 were re-equipped with Hawker Demon two seat interceptors and transferred into No. 12 (Fighter) Group RAF. Thornaby became an RAF station proper when a station headquarters was established on 1 June 1937 under the command of Wing Commander John Leacroft MC (1888–1971).

233 (General Reconnaissance) Squadron equipped with Avro Ansons arrived in May 1937 and in June 1937 the station was transferred to Coastal Command with 224 (GR) Squadron, also equipped with Ansons, arrived in July of the same year. The late 1930s saw the station alternating between Coastal and Bomber Commands, with 608 being a designated fighter squadron. From 1 September 1938, No. 233 and 224 Squadrons were replaced by Bomber Command 106 and 185 Squadrons equipped initially with Fairey Battles before re-equipping with Handley Page Hampdens.

Ansons of 269 Squadron and Vickers Vildebeests of 42 (Torpedo Bomber) Squadron relocated here during the Munich crisis while 106 and 185 moved temporarily to RAF Cottesmore before moving back to Thornaby after the crisis. Thornaby was one of only ten airfields in the country known to have had paved runways before the war started, although runways were under construction at eight fighter stations due to an Air Ministry conference on 28 April 1939, but only two of these were completed by 3 September 1939.

=== Second World War ===
On 20 March 1939 No. 608 Squadron were transferred to No. 18 Group Coastal Command and with war looming were embodied into the RAF for full-time duties on 24 August 1939. Numbers 106 and 185 Bomber Command Squadrons moved to Cottesmore in August 1939 and Coastal Command 220 Squadron arrived with Ansons on 21 August from RAF Bircham Newton, thereafter the station remained within Coastal Command until the end of hostilities. Almost immediately after arriving No. 220 began to re-equip with the American built Lockheed Hudson, during this period the instructors of the 220 Squadron Hudson Conversion Flight (The Hudson Circus) along with 220 and 608 Squadrons were inspected by King George VI who visited the station on 1 November 1939 accompanied by Chief Of Air Staff together with Sir Frederick Bowhill and Air Commodore Breeze, AOC 18 Group.

A detachment from 224 Squadron (the first squadron to become operational on the Hudson) arrived from Leuchars to cover 220 Squadron's "war work", whilst they were being converted onto the Hudson. On 16 October 1939 the first 220 Squadron Hudson operation took place, during the conversion the squadron carried on for a short time with the Anson due to a shortage of serviceable Hudsons, a number of which were awaiting modifications such as installation of gun turrets, bomb racks and fitting of twin front Browning machine guns, this was completed at Thornaby.

With more Hudsons coming on strength, 220 Squadron began North Sea patrols and Battle Flights attacking enemy airfields and shipping on the Scandinavian coast and Heligoland Bight. Airborne at 08:25 on 16 February 1940, a battle flight of three Lockheed Hudson aircraft, K, M, and V of No. 220 Squadron located the German ship "Altmark" (the supply and prison ship of the Admiral Graf Spee) in Norwegian waters at 12.55, an action which led to the subsequent liberation of 299 prisoners by HMS Cossack of the Royal Navy.

During June 1940 a detachment from 224 Squadron was back at Thornaby while 220 Squadron were covering the evacuation at Dunkirk from Bircham Newton. Coinciding with a visit from Lord Trenchard on 9 June 1940, 608 were instructed to re-equip with the Blackburn Botha and, on 28 June the squadron began to receive the first of the Botha torpedo bombers, the only squadron to use the aircraft operationally, however, these aircraft proved unsuccessful having handling and airframe fatigue problems and by December 1940 the squadron had reverted to the Anson. To cover for the unreliable Botha, Fairey Swordfish of the Royal Navy 812 Squadron from North Coates were occasionally on duty. In February 1941 608 re-equipped with Bristol Blenheim Mk IVs and were now able to carry out more offensive operations. On 8 July 1941 the squadron was flying its first sorties in the Lockheed Hudson, this aircraft with its better performance and a longer endurance enabled 608 to carry out operations much further afield, like that of its sister squadron No 220. In March 1941 No. 114 Squadron arrived on transfer from Bomber Command equipped with the Blenheim Mk IV. April 1941 saw 220 Squadron depart for Wick, by this time 1509 Beam Approach Training Flight had formed here.

In July 1941 two more units arrived, for a short time No. 143 Squadron with the Bristol Beaufighter Mk 1c and, No. 6 (Coastal) Operational Training Unit with Hudsons and a few Ansons and Oxfords. In January 1942 a detachment of 122 (Bombay) Squadron arrived with Spitfire Vbs and No. 608 Squadron moved to Wick and in April 1509 (BAT) flight moved to Church Lawford. In March 1942 the Spitfire detachment was replaced by one from 332 (Norwegian) Squadron and from April 1942 until December 1943 No.1 Anti Aircraft Co-operation Unit were flying de Havilland Tiger Moths and Hawker Henleys from Thornaby. In June 1942 the fighter detachment was again refreshed, this time by 403 Squadron RCAF and in October 1942 No. 6 (C) OTU replaced their Hudsons with Vickers Wellingtons, at this time it also absorbed a Polish training flight from 18 OTU and, the following month a Czech flight, No. 1429.

The Royal Canadian Air Force, replaced the fighter element in January 1943 with a detachment of 401 Squadron RCAF and on 10 March No. 6 OTU moved to Silloth. On 23 March 1943 No. 1 (Coastal) Operational Training Unit RAF arrived from Silloth and trained Handley Page Halifax, Boeing Flying Fortress, and Consolidated Liberator crews. In May 1943 No. 401 Squadron left and was replaced by No. 306 Polish Fighter Squadron from RAF Catterick on 30 May 1943, also equipped with the Spitfire Mk Vb, and stayed until 31 July.

In October 1943 an Air Sea Rescue Training Unit re-located here equipped with Vickers Warwick aircraft, followed by 280 ASR Squadron the same month which immediately began to convert from Ansons to Warwicks. In November 1943 Warwicks of 281 ASR squadron arrived to join 280 Squadron and stayed until February 1944. No. 1 OTU disbanded on 19 October 1943 and the Halifax, Fortress and Liberator training was transferred to No 1674 Heavy Conversion Unit. A detachment of 280 squadron Warwicks were sent to RAF Thorney Island in December 1943 before moving to Strubby in May 1944, a detachment of Warwicks was also left at Thornaby. Leading up to D-Day Hadrian gliders were towed by Armstrong Whitworth Albemarle aircraft from Thornaby.

On 14 October 1944 a third ASR squadron arrived, No. 279, equipped initially with Hudsons the squadron began to re-equip with Warwicks plus a few Sea Otters and Hurricanes, whilst 279 were converting onto the Warwick a detachment from 280 squadron were covering ASR sorties from Thornaby. The Air Sea Rescue squadrons developed survival packs which were dropped to ditched aircrew. These were named after the RAF stations where they were developed, for instance the Bircham Barrel and Lindholme Gear; the Thornaby Bag was a container of food and First Aid supplies developed at RAF Thornaby, but was superseded by the Lindholme Gear due to the Thornaby Bag bursting open in all but very calm seas when it was deployed.

Over the next few months 279 Squadron were kept busy on ASR sorties and in the closing stages of the war rocket equipped Beaufighters of No. 455 Squadron, Royal Australian Air Force, from the RAF Dallachy Anzac Strike Wing arrived. They continued to attack enemy shipping in the Baltic and on 3 May 1945 flew their last sortie of the war to Kiel, they left two mine-sweepers destroyed, 455 Squadron disbanded at Thornaby on 25 May 1945.

=== Post war ===
No. 279 Squadron remained at Thornaby and in September 1945 moved its HQ to RAF Beccles where the squadron was to convert to the Lancaster ASR.III, leaving only a detachment behind at Thornaby. In the event it was the detachment at Thornaby that received and converted to them and 279 flew their first operational sorties in the Lancaster on 8 November 1945. Also in November 1945 No. 280 Squadron returned here and in January 1946 the remaining 279 squadron detachment of Lancasters were disbanded at Thornaby.

In May 1946 "Thornaby's own" No 608 (North Riding) Squadron was re-formed as part of Reserve Command, No. 64 Group RAF, in the light bomber role, however, they only received de Havilland Mosquito T3s and Airspeed Oxford T1s. On 21 June 1946 No. 280 Squadron disbanded at Thornaby and, in July 1947 No. 608 became a night fighter squadron when they received Mosquito NF 30s. No. 2608 (North Riding) Light Anti Aircraft Squadron RAuxAF of the Royal Auxiliary Air Force Regiment were formed here in December 1947, armed with the 40mm Bofors Gun before being reorganised, re-equipped and re-trained in 1955 as a mobile infantry unit equipped with Land Rovers. In March 1948 a third auxiliary squadron was formed here, No. 3608 (North Riding) Fighter Control Unit, who trained men and women as Radar Operators and Fighter Plotters.

In May 1948 No. 608 became a day fighter unit when it received Supermarine Spitfire F22s and North American Harvard T26s, in December 1949 608 re-equipped with the de Havilland Vampire F3, then the FB5 in 1952 and finally the FB9 in 1955, the squadron also operated the Gloster Meteor T7 between 1950 and 1957. On 7 December 1952 No. 533 (Rifle) Squadron RAF Regiment arrived from Hereford (where they were formed on 28 July 1952) and became part of No. 21 Wing RAF Regiment.

On 1 January 1954 the squadron began conversion to a Field Squadron and was redesignated as No. 533 (Field) Squadron RAF Regiment. On 18 November 1954 No. 275 Search And Rescue Squadron arrived from RAF Linton-on-Ouse equipped with Bristol Sycamore HR.13s and soon after HR.14s, this was the only helicopter SAR unit in the RAF at the time and was on 24-hour stand-by duty and was able to get airborne within ten minutes of receiving an emergency call. The squadron began to expand rapidly and detached flights from its headquarters at Thornaby to strategic points near the coast from Scotland down to the south of England. In January 1956 No. 533 (Field) Squadron disbanded at Thornaby and, on 10 March 1957 numbers 608 and 2608 Squadrons disbanded too leaving only 275 and 3608 Squadrons on the station.

In September 1957 Hawker Hunter F6s of No. 92 Squadron temporarily re-located here from RAF Middleton St George while the runways there were being extended. No. 275 Squadron departed for Leconfield in October 1957 and a year later on 1 October 1958 No. 92 Squadron moved back to Middleton St George leaving only 3608 (North Riding) Squadron who disbanded shortly after. The last entry in the station diary was made on 13 October 1958 and stated that the station had been reduced to a Care and Maintenance level as from that date, the entry was signed, Flight Lieutenant H.J. Grant, Camp Commandant, C and M party, Royal Air Force Thornaby. The last unit to be based at Thornaby was then 1261 (Thornaby) Squadron, Air Training Corps, with its HQ on the top floor of the brick built barrack block, which still stands as one of the last remaining buildings of RAF Thornaby.

=== Motor sport ===
Thornaby
- Location: North Yorkshire, England
- Opened: 1959
- Closed: 1961
- Length: 1.9 mi (3.1 km)

Motor Racing took place at Thornaby on only four occasions, the organisation being in hands of the Darlington & District Motor Club, who 'discovered' Thornaby and sought Air Ministry approval to race there. The first meeting was held on 6 September 1959 on a 1.9 mile circuit; for the meeting on 18 April 1960, the length of the track had been reduced to 1.45 miles. At one of these meetings Jimmy Blumer was the star, driving the ex-Stirling Moss bob-tail Cooper.

There is evidence that race meetings were organised by Middlesbrough & District Motor Club; they produced at least three of the race programmes, Sunday 9 August 1959 at 2:30 pm, Whit Monday 6 June 1960 at 2:30 pm and Sunday 20 August 1961 at 1:30 pm.

== Today ==
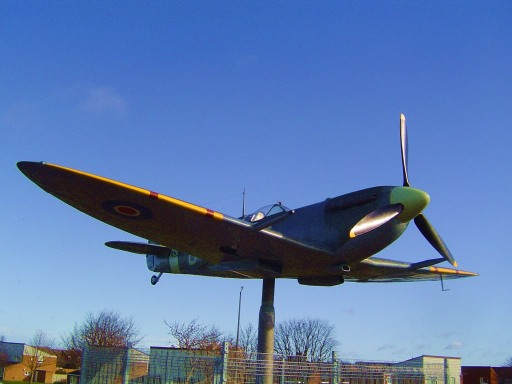
The Spitfire on Thornaby Road

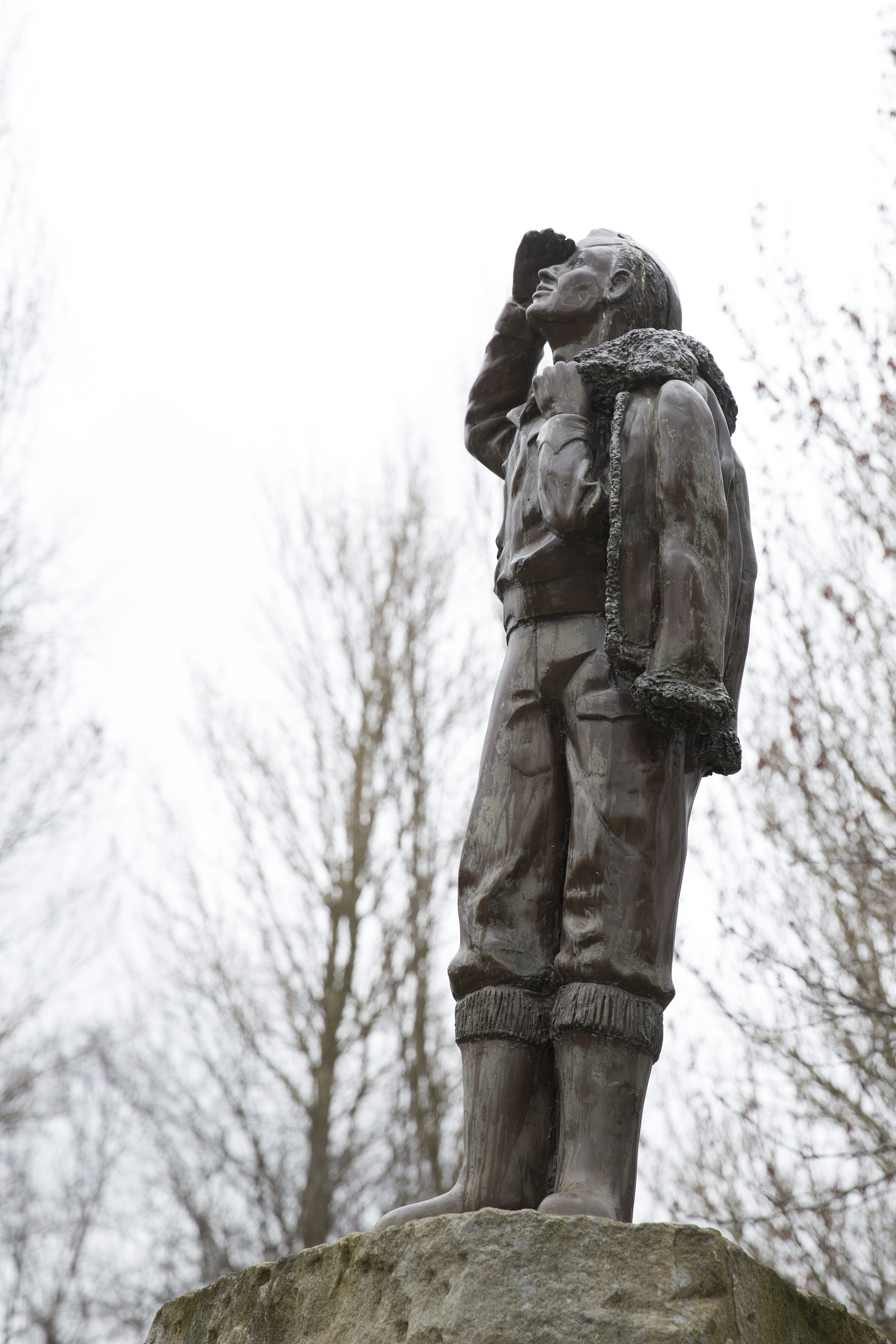
The Airmen memorial at Thornaby on the site of the former RAF Thornaby

RAF Thornaby closed to flying in October 1958 when the Hawker Hunters of 92 Squadron left for RAF Middleton St George, the station was reduced to a care and maintenance level until being sold to the then Thornaby-on-Tees Borough Council for redevelopment in 1962. It became known to the council in 1958 that the RAF were to abandon the airfield and, after a period of negotiations with the North Riding County Council as local planning authority, the various land uses for the area were agreed upon and in 1961 an amended town map was approved by the Minister of Housing and Local Government. Most of the airfield now lies beneath houses, light industrial units and the Pavilions shopping centre as the town of Thornaby expanded southwards in the 1960s and 70s. Traces can be picked out via satellite imagery however and a ground visit will reveal a number of surviving structures within the contemporary buildings. As with other developments of this type over former RAF airfields, many of the street names are taken from past or present RAF bases and also from notable RAF Personnel (Tedder Avenue, Trenchard Avenue, Havilland Road, Bader Avenue etc.).

In January 1976 a stained glass window was unveiled by the Archbishop of York in St Paul's Church on Thornaby road.

In 1997 an RAF memorial was erected at Thornaby, and to this day the people of Thornaby take great pride in their history and celebrate the lives of those who served there.

In 2007 a full-size replica Spitfire aircraft was erected on the roundabout at the junction of Thornaby Road, Bader Avenue and Trenchard Avenue.

== See also ==
- List of former Royal Air Force stations
