= No. 489 Squadron RNZAF =

No. 489 (NZ) Squadron RAF
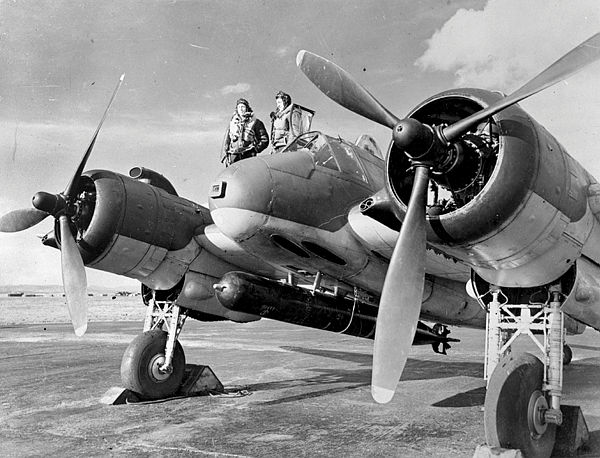
- A Bristol Beaufighter of No. 489 Squadron with its crew, April 1944
- Active: August 1941–August 1945
- Country: United Kingdom
- Allegiance: New Zealand
- Branch: Royal Air Force
- Role: Anti-Shipping
- Mottos: Māori: Whakatanagata kia kaha (Translation: "Acquit yourselves like men, be strong")
- Anniversaries: 12 August 1941
- Equipment: Bristol Beaufort; Bristol Blenheim Mk. IVf; Handley Page Hampden; Bristol Beaufighter; De Havilland Mosquito
- Engagements: Second World War

Insignia
- Squadron Badge: Standing on a Torpedo, a Kiwi
- Squadron Codes: XA (Jan 1942 – Nov 1943); P6 (Nov 1943 – Aug 1945)

No. 489 (NZ) Squadron was a torpedo bomber squadron established for service during the Second World War. It was a New Zealand squadron formed under Article XV of the Empire Air Training Plan. Although its flying personnel were largely drawn from the Royal New Zealand Air Force, the squadron served in Europe under the operational and administrative command of the Royal Air Force as part of Coastal Command.

Formed in August 1941, the squadron commenced operations in April the following year, flying Handley Page Hampden medium bombers. Its main role at the time was anti-submarine duties in the Atlantic but it was soon switched to operating against German shipping and carrying out patrols over the North Sea, along the Norwegian coast. In October 1943, the squadron ceased flying sorties while it converted to the Bristol Beaufighter heavy fighter. It resumed anti-shipping duties in January 1944, and later in the year formed the Anzac Strike Wing, along with No. 455 Squadron. Now flying to France and the Low Countries, the squadron supported the Allied preparations for the upcoming invasion of Normandy. After the invasion, during which it sought to destroy German motor launches that could attack the invasion fleet, it returned to operations over the North Sea to Norway. It was disbanded in August 1945, once it was determined it was no longer required for service in the war.

== Background ==
In the mid-1930s, the Royal Air Force (RAF) was in the process of expanding and required an increasing number of suitable flying personnel. A number of schemes were implemented for New Zealanders to obtain short-service commissions in the RAF with the intention of then transferring to the Royal New Zealand Air Force (RNZAF) in the future. This led to over 500 New Zealanders serving in the RAF by the time of the outbreak of the Second World War.

At around the same time there was discussion between the governments of Britain, Australia, Canada and New Zealand to facilitate the co-ordination of training of air crew in the event of hostilities. This led to the implementation of the Empire Air Training Scheme (ETAS) in December 1939. Under this agreement, New Zealand committed to initially supply 880 full trained pilots for the RAF, with another 520 pilots being trained to an elementary standard annually. As each of the Dominion governments desired its personnel to serve together, the ETAS had a clause, Article XV, that allowed for the establishment of squadrons with personnel from the respective countries. In theory, the Dominions would supply the ground crew as well as flying personnel. However, in New Zealand's case, there was a reluctance to maintain RNZAF squadrons in Britain so the decision was made to allow for the formation of squadrons within the RAF designated as being New Zealand. These squadrons, known as Article XV squadrons, were formed around a cadre of New Zealand flying personnel already serving in the RAF but supplemented by newly trained pilots from the RNZAF, with administrative and ground crew being predominantly British.

== Formation ==
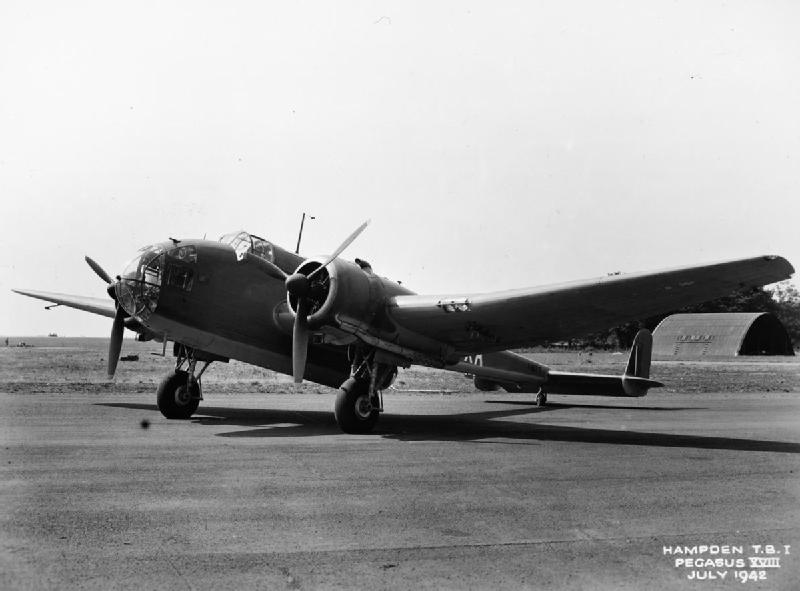
A Handley Page Hampden of No. 489 Squadron at Thorney Island

No. 489 Squadron was formed on 12 August 1941 at RAF Leuchars, equipped with Bristol Beaufort aircraft to operate as a torpedo bomber unit of Coastal Command. Its motto in Māori, the indigenous language of New Zealand, was Whakatanagata kia kaha, which can be translated as "Acquit ye like men, be strong". At the time the squadron was formed, there were few New Zealanders with experience operating torpedo bombers so, despite being an Article XV squadron, some personnel were from other countries. It was led by Wing Commander J. Brown who, like his flight commanders, Squadron Leaders B. Sandeman and D. Evans, was an Englishman. Although training was initially on Beauforts, these aircraft were soon required for service in the Mediterranean. They were replaced by the Bristol Blenheim Mk. IVf and then the Handley Page Hampden.

== Operational history ==
=== 1942 ===
The squadron became operational in April 1942, by this time having 68 New Zealand flying personnel. The squadron moved to Thorney Island in the south of England from where it carried out anti-submarine patrols into the Atlantic and as far as the Bay of Biscay. Shortly after it began these flights, one of its aircraft were attacked by Focke-Wulf Fw 190 fighters, the first engagement with the Luftwaffe for the squadron. The Hampden that was attacked was able to safely return but with two of its crew wounded. Its rear gunner was awarded the squadron's first Distinguished Flying Cross for having likely shot down one of the Fw 190s.

In July, No. 489 Squadron returned to Scotland, based at RAF Skitten, where its primary task was patrolling the Norwegian coast and attacking shipping. It also provided aerial cover for vessels making their way to the naval base at Scapa Flow, escorted convoys to the Russian Arctic and also carried out anti-submarine patrols. On 17 September, the Karpfanger, a ship of 5,000 tons, was torpedoed by Flying Officer A. J. Mottram, the first ship to be sunk by the squadron.

=== 1943 ===
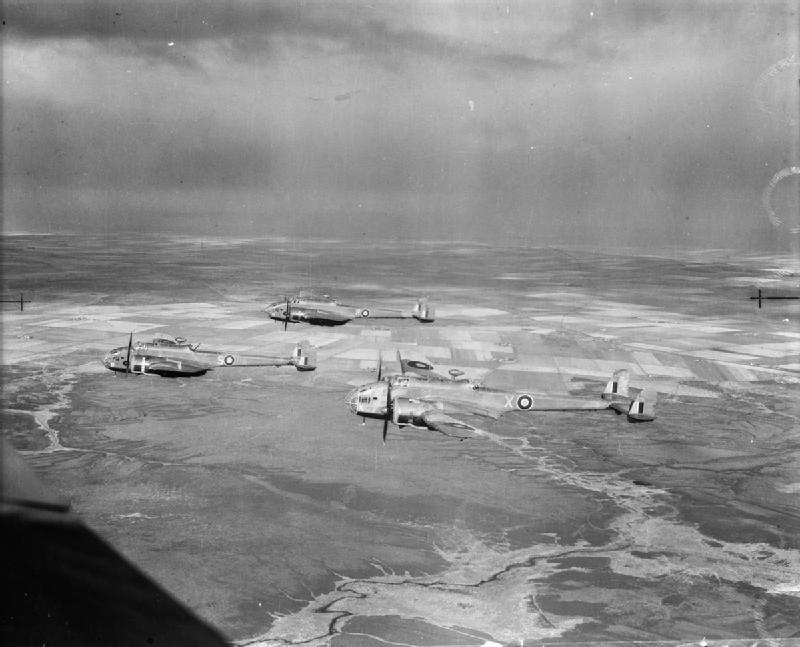
Hampdens of No. 489 Squadron in flight over northern Scotland

At the start of 1943, the squadron moved to the RAF station at Wick, located on the north-east coast of Scotland. By this time, it was being led by Wing Commander V. Darling. It continued with its anti-shipping work along the Norwegian coast, making 18 attacks on vessels by the middle of the year. One notable success, which occurred while working with the Australian No. 455 Squadron, was the sinking of the Ahrensburg near Stavanger in late January. A 7,000-ton merchant ship was sunk in early April and at the end of the month, another was so badly damaged it was run aground. Its anti-shipping work was dangerous; heavy flak fire often damaged, if not destroyed, the attacking aircraft and German fighters were easily a match for the obsolete Hampdens. Over the summer months there was increased emphasis on anti-submarine patrols and search and rescue missions.

In August, Wing Commander John Dinsdale, a New Zealander, took over command of the squadron. On 16 September it flew its last major operation with the Hampdens when a flight of four aircraft attacked a five-vessel convoy it sighted while patrolling along the Norwegian coast. They were able to sink a merchant ship. Soon afterwards, it was taken off operations having accounted for sinking 36,000 tons of shipping by this stage of the year. The squadron returned to Leuchars to begin converting to the Bristol Beaufighter, a process which took several weeks. As the Beaufighter only required two aircrew, a pilot and navigator, the wireless operators and air gunners were surplus to requirements. In addition, several of its navigators were posted to other units while the pilots learnt to operate the Beaufighter.

=== 1944 ===
The squadron resumed operations in January 1944 and returned to its anti-shipping duties, targeting merchant vessels, loaded with supplies for the German war effort and often accompanied by flak ships, steaming along the Norwegian coast. On the squadron's first sortie with the Beaufighter, it attacked a convoy of ships near the southern coast of Norway. A merchantman of around 12,000 tons was sunk before a group of Messerschmitt Bf 109 fighters saw off the attackers. Another ship, spotted earlier in the sortie, was strafed and badly damaged.

From March 1944 No. 489 Squadron formed part of the Anzac Strike Wing, along with No. 455 Squadron, and shortly afterwards moved south to a base at Langham, in Norfolk. The wing operated in support of the Allied preparations for the upcoming invasion of Normandy. It often flew operations to France and the Low Countries, targeting merchant ships and looking for movement along shipping lanes. During these operations, a portion of the attacking Beaufighters were equipped with cannon instead of torpedoes, their role being to target the anti-aircraft defences of the shipping being attacked. They also sought out E-boats and R-boats, which were German armed motor launches.

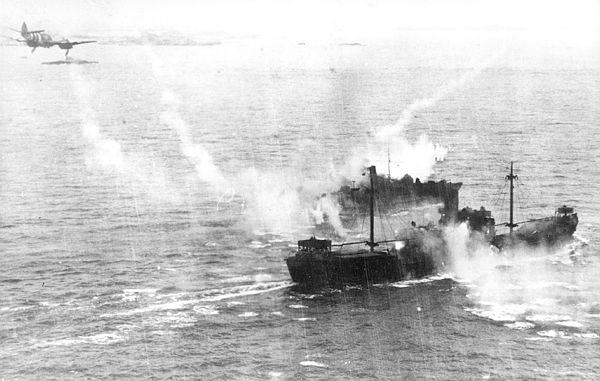
No. 489 Squadron Beaufighters attacking shipping, 15 July 1944

On D-Day itself and immediately afterwards, the Anzac Strike Wing was tasked with seeking out and destroying E- and R-boats, which could threaten the vessels of the Allied invasion fleet. Flying as far as Holland through to Dieppe, around 34 motor launches were attacked by the squadron and many of these were sunk. A major sortie was conducted on 15 June, when the squadron fulfilled an anti-flak role while several other squadrons attacked a E-boat depot ship and a 8,000-ton supply ship with torpedoes. This saw both ships sunk and as many as ten escort vessels destroyed with no losses among the attacking aircraft. Two weeks later saw more major success for the squadron, with two cargo ships destroyed off the Frisian Islands. The threat posed by German surface vessels in the English Channel had considerably reduced and No. 489 Squadron was soon able to return to its previous anti-shipping role along the Norwegian coast.

By October, No. 489 Squadron, now led by Wing Commander L. A. Robertson, was operating from RAF Dallachy in Scotland. It was uncomfortable for the personnel of the squadron due to the inclement weather in the area and the relatively crude facilities. The aircraft flew day and night, and when they reached the Norwegian coast, often had to fly deep into the fjords to seek out German shipping. The high losses experienced by the Germans resulted in more shipping moving at night and sheltering in the fjords during the day.

=== 1945 and disbandment ===
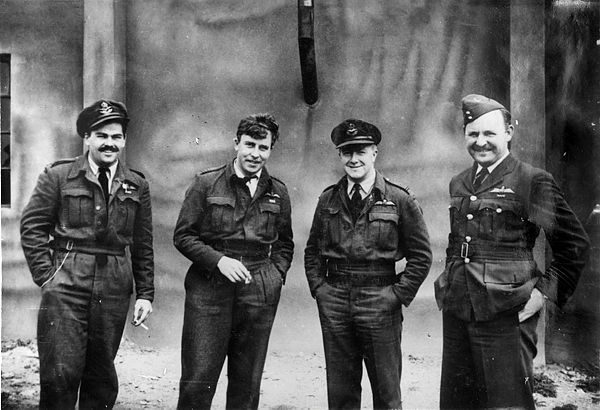
A group of pilots of No. 489 Squadron; its leader, Wing Commander J. S. Dinsdale stands on the right

No. 489 Squadron's anti-shipping work along Norway's coast continued into 1945, and for the final months of the war it was led by Wing Commander D. Hammond. The squadron continued to operate as part of the Anzac Strike Wing, which now included a British squadron as well as the Australian unit. Major sorties during the year included one on 9 February to Førde Fjord, in which a Narvik-class destroyer was attacked and damaged by 30 Beaufighters. Later in the month, one of the squadron's crews sighted and sunk the Alsterstum, a 2,500-ton freighter carrying a load of mines. Another crew torpedoed a 3,000-ton cargo ship the following month.

The last operational mission for the squadron, involving a pair of Beaufighters, was flown on 21 May. By this time, it had carried out about 1,250 sorties in the previous five months. In June, with the war in Europe now at an end, it moved to RAF Banff, in Banffshire, and began to re-equip with the de Havilland Mosquito with a view to moving to the Pacific. However, before the conversion to Mosquitoes was completed, the Empire of Japan collapsed and the war ended. The squadron was subsequently disbanded on 1 August.

=== Operational summary ===
During the course of its service during the Second World War, No. 489 Squadron flew 2,380 sorties and 9,773 hours on operations. A total of 33 New Zealanders were killed while serving with the squadron. Awards made to its personnel as a result of their service with the squadron included two Distinguished Service Orders, 19 Distinguished Flying Crosses with one bar, a Conspicuous Gallantry Medal and a Distinguished Flying Medal.

== Commanding officers ==
The following served as commanding officers of No. 489 Squadron:

- Wing Commander J. A. S. Brown (August 1941–October 1942);
- Wing Commander V. C. Darling (October 1942–August 1943);
- Wing Commander J. S. Dinsdale (August 1943–August 1944);
- Wing Commander L. A. Robertson (August 1944–February 1945);
- Wing Commander D. H. Hammond (February–August 1945).
