= German submarine U-227 =

German World War II submarine

Coordinates: 64°40′N 6°40′W

History

Nazi Germany
- Name: U-227
- Ordered: 7 December 1940
- Builder: Germaniawerft, Kiel
- Yard number: 657
- Laid down: 18 October 1941
- Launched: 9 July 1942
- Commissioned: 22 August 1942
- Fate: Sunk by aircraft, 30 April 1943

General characteristics
- Class & type: Type VIIC submarine
- Displacement: 769 tonnes (757 long tons) surfaced; 871 t (857 long tons) submerged
- Length: 67.10 m (220 ft 2 in) o/a; 50.50 m (165 ft 8 in) pressure hull
- Beam: 6.20 m (20 ft 4 in) o/a; 4.70 m (15 ft 5 in) pressure hull
- Height: 9.60 m (31 ft 6 in)
- Draught: 4.74 m (15 ft 7 in)
- Installed power: 2,800–3,200 PS (2,100–2,400 kW; 2,800–3,200 bhp) (diesels); 750 PS (550 kW; 740 shp) (electric)
- Propulsion: 2 shafts; 2 × diesel engines; 2 × electric motors
- Speed: 17.7 knots (32.8 km/h; 20.4 mph) surfaced; 7.6 knots (14.1 km/h; 8.7 mph) submerged
- Range: 8,500 nmi (15,700 km; 9,800 mi) at 10 knots (19 km/h; 12 mph) surfaced; 80 nmi (150 km; 92 mi) at 4 knots (7.4 km/h; 4.6 mph) submerged
- Test depth: 230 m (750 ft); Crush depth: 250–295 m (820–968 ft)
- Complement: 4 officers, 40–56 enlisted
- Armament: 5 × 53.3 cm (21 in) torpedo tubes (four bow, one stern); 14 × torpedoes or 26 TMA mines; 1 × 8.8 cm (3.46 in) deck gun (220 rounds); 1 x 2 cm (0.79 in) C/30 AA gun

Service record
- Part of: 5th U-boat Flotilla; 22 August 1942 – 1 April 1943; 7th U-boat Flotilla; 1 – 30 April 1943
- Identification codes: M 51 115
- Commanders: Oblt.z.S. / Kptlt. Jürgen Kuntze; 22 August 1942 – 30 April 1943
- Operations: 1 patrol: 24 – 30 April 1943
- Victories: None

German submarine U-227 was a Type VIIC U-boat of Nazi Germany's Kriegsmarine built for service in the Battle of the Atlantic. She was cursed with repeated bad luck during her brief service life. Her commander was Kapitänleutnant Jürgen Kuntze, an officer with just five months U-boat experience at the time of his promotion.

== Design ==
German Type VIIC submarines were preceded by the shorter Type VIIB submarines. U-227 had a displacement of 769 tonnes (757 long tons) when at the surface and 871 tonnes (857 long tons) while submerged. She had a total length of 67.10 m (220 ft 2 in), a pressure hull length of 50.50 m (165 ft 8 in), a beam of 6.20 m (20 ft 4 in), a height of 9.60 m (31 ft 6 in), and a draught of 4.74 m (15 ft 7 in). The submarine was powered by two Germaniawerft F46 four-stroke, six-cylinder supercharged diesel engines producing a total of 2,800 to 3,200 metric horsepower (2,060 to 2,350 kW; 2,760 to 3,160 shp) for use while surfaced, two AEG GU 460/8–27 double-acting electric motors producing a total of 750 metric horsepower (550 kW; 740 shp) for use while submerged. She had two shafts and two 1.23 m (4 ft) propellers. The boat was capable of operating at depths of up to 230 metres (750 ft).

The submarine had a maximum surface speed of 17.7 knots (32.8 km/h; 20.4 mph) and a maximum submerged speed of 7.6 knots (14.1 km/h; 8.7 mph). When submerged, the boat could operate for 80 nautical miles (150 km; 92 mi) at 4 knots (7.4 km/h; 4.6 mph); when surfaced, she could travel 8,500 nautical miles (15,700 km; 9,800 mi) at 10 knots (19 km/h; 12 mph). U-227 was fitted with five 53.3 cm (21 in) torpedo tubes (four fitted at the bow and one at the stern), fourteen torpedoes, one 8.8 cm (3.46 in) SK C/35 naval gun, 220 rounds, and an anti-aircraft gun. The boat had a complement of between forty-four and sixty.

== Construction ==
U-227 was built during 1941 and 1942 by the Germaniawerft shipyard in the fleet base at Kiel as yard number 657, and was completed in August 1942, in preparation for operations over the coming winter. During the initial working-up period, disaster struck one month into the program, when U-227 ran onto a Royal Air Force mine dropped by an aircraft in Danzig Bay. The crippled boat survived without any serious injuries, but only just managed to limp into port. The mining of coastal waters was a new tactic for the RAF, but one which would reap dividends amongst the port-based German navy. The repairs to the boat following this misfortune meant that she was not ready for operations until the following April, when Kuntze, having worked his crew hard, embarked on his only war patrol.

== Operational patrol ==
U-227 lasted a mere six days on her first operational patrol, when she was ordered to proceed with all haste to the North Atlantic Ocean to interdict Canadian convoys. Passing through the gap between the Faroe Islands and Iceland, she was spotted, despite bad weather, by a Hampden bomber of No. 455 Squadron, Royal Australian Air Force, which swooped onto the submarine and dropped a bomb on her. U-227 dived under the ocean following the attack and never resurfaced, presumably hitting the sea floor hundreds of feet below, where she still lies with all 49 of her crew.

== Bibliography ==
- Busch, Rainer; Röll, Hans-Joachim (1999). German U-boat commanders of World War II : a biographical dictionary. Translated by Brooks, Geoffrey. London, Annapolis, Md: Greenhill Books, Naval Institute Press. ISBN 1-55750-186-6.
- Busch, Rainer; Röll, Hans-Joachim (1999). Deutsche U-Boot-Verluste von September 1939 bis Mai 1945 [German U-boat losses from September 1939 to May 1945]. Der U-Boot-Krieg (in German). Vol. IV. Hamburg, Berlin, Bonn: Mittler. ISBN 3-8132-0514-2.
- Gröner, Erich; Jung, Dieter; Maass, Martin (1991). U-boats and Mine Warfare Vessels. German Warships 1815–1945. Vol. 2. Translated by Thomas, Keith; Magowan, Rachel. London: Conway Maritime Press. ISBN 0-85177-593-4.
- Sharpe, Peter (1998). U-Boat Fact File. Great Britain: Midland Publishing. ISBN 1-85780-072-9.
