= No. 144 Squadron RAF =

Defunct flying squadron of the Royal Air Force

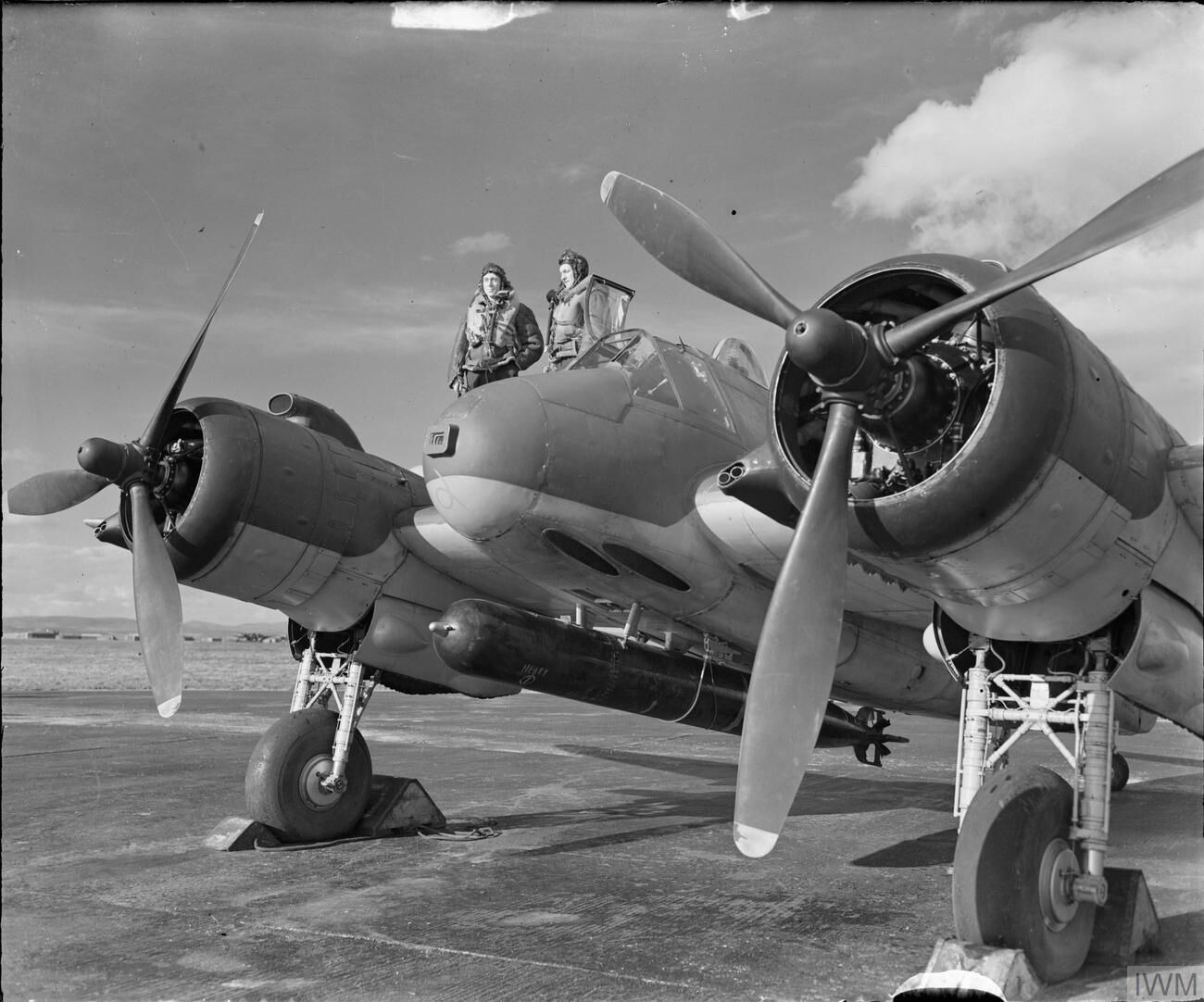
- A Bristol Beaufighter torpedo bomber of No. 144 Squadron at Tain, in Ross-shire
- Active: 20 March 1918 – 4 February 1919; 11 January 1937 – 25 May 1945; 1 December 1959 – 23 August 1963
- Country: United Kingdom
- Branch: Royal Air Force
- Role: various
- Motto(s): Who shall stop us

No. 144 Squadron RAF was a squadron of the British Royal Air Force. It was first formed in 1918 during the First World War, operating as a bomber squadron in the Middle East. It reformed in 1937, serving in the bomber and anti-shipping roles during the Second World War. A third incarnation saw the squadron serving as a strategic missile squadron during the late 1950s and early 1960s.

== History ==
=== First World War ===
On 20 March 1918, a new squadron of the Royal Flying Corps was established at Port Said in British administrated Egypt. It was intended as a corps reconnaissance squadron, to work in support of the Army, and initially operated a mix of aircraft, including Royal Aircraft Factory B.E.2es and Royal Aircraft Factory B.E.12s. The squadron re-equipped with Airco DH.9 light bombers in August that year, reinforcing 40th (Army) Wing as it prepared for a major offensive against Ottoman forces. On 19 September, the opening actions of the Battle of Megiddo began, with 144 Squadron attacking Turkish communication and command centres, including the headquarters of the Ottoman Seventh Army at Nablus. The Ottoman forces were soon in full retreat, and all available air power, including 144 Squadron, was sent to repeatedly attack the force of the Ottoman Seventh Army as it retreated through the Wadi al-Far'a, with the Seventh Army effectively destroyed by these sustained aerial attacks.

On 17 October 1918, the squadron moved to Mudros on the island of Lemnos near the Dardanelles, but the Armistice of Mudros ended the war against the Ottoman Empire on 30 October. The squadron returned to the United Kingdom in December, disbanding at RAF Ford on 4 February 1919.

=== Reformation ===
No. 144 Squadron reformed on 11 January 1937, when a flight from 101 Squadron, equipped with four Boulton & Paul Overstrand twin-engined bombers and based at RAF Bicester in Oxfordshire, was detached to form the cadre of the new squadron. 144 Squadron quickly received Avro Anson monoplanes to replace the obsolete Overstrand biplanes, and moved to RAF Hemswell in Lincolnshire on 8 February 1937. It supplemented its Ansons with Hawker Audax biplanes in March before replacing both with more modern Bristol Blenheim I bombers in August that year. By now a part of 5 Group of Bomber Command, the squadron re-equipped with Handley Page Hampdens in March 1939.

=== Second World War ===
No. 144 Squadron was still equipped with Hampdens on the outbreak of the Second World War in September 1939, flying its first mission on 26 September, when it dispatched 12 aircraft to search for, and attack if found, German naval forces in the North Sea. On this occasion, however, it encountered no allowable targets. Three days later, the squadron sent out 11 aircraft over the Heligoland Bight in another search for German warships. The strike force split into two groups; while one formation spotted but failed to hit two German destroyers, the second formation was intercepted by Luftwaffe Messerschmitt Bf 109 fighters, which shot down all five Hampdens.

The squadron started to fly night-time leaflet dropping raids over Germany from February 1940, and on 6 March it flew its first bombing raid against a German land target, the seaplane base at Hörnum on the island of Sylt. The squadron continued to operate in the night bomber role through the rest of 1940 and 1941.

As a result of the Channel Dash in February 1942, when the German battleships Scharnhorst and Gneisenau and the heavy cruiser Prinz Eugen managed to break the British blockade and sail from France through the English Channel to Germany, indicated to the RAF that their anti-shipping strike strength was inadequate, and it was decided to convert two Hampden squadrons to the torpedo bomber role, with No. 144 Squadron being one of the two chosen for conversion. The squadron transferred from Bomber Command to 18 Group Coastal Command on 21 April 1942, moving to RAF Leuchars on the East coast of Scotland. It flew its first torpedo bomber mission on 27 July 1942.

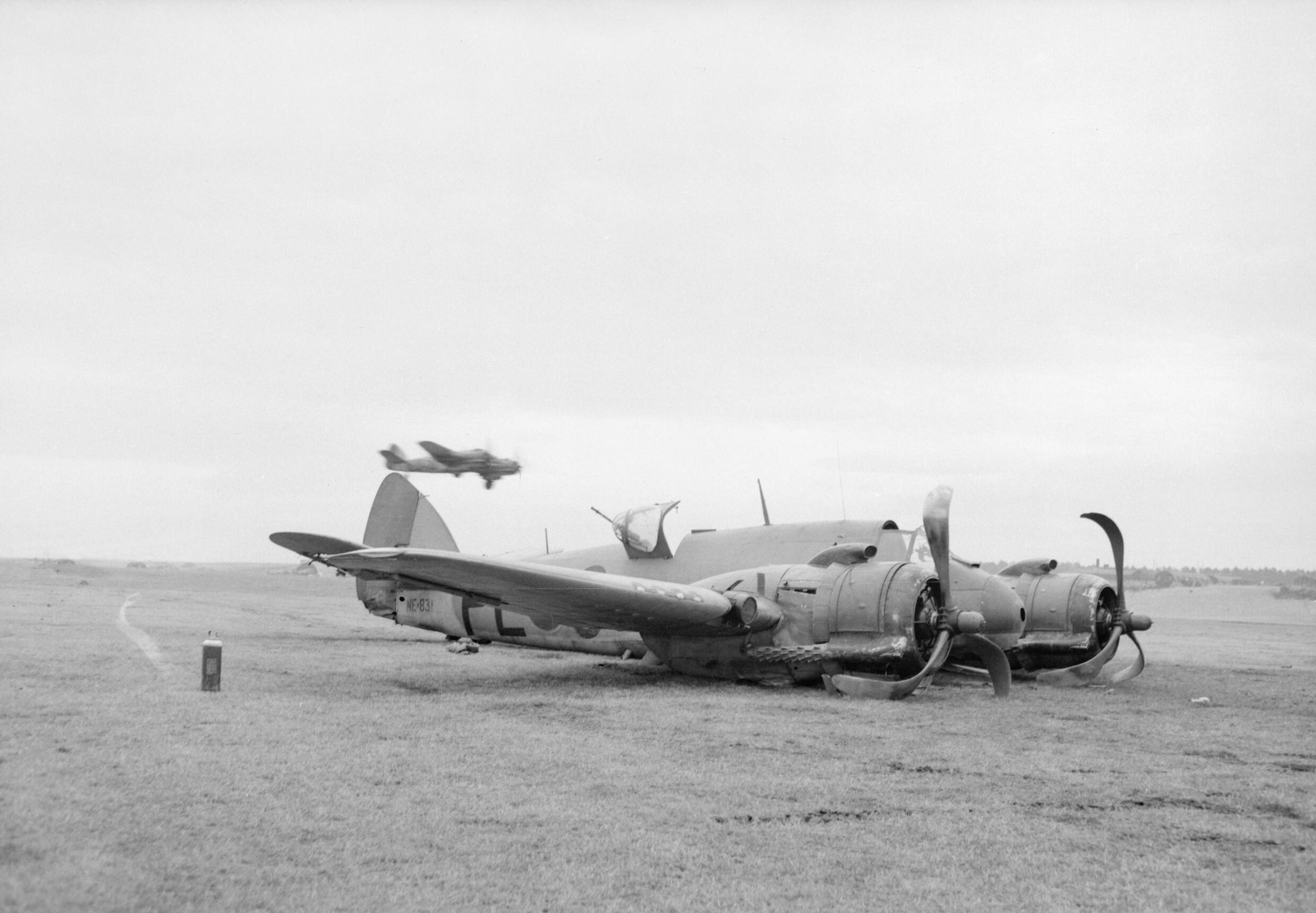
A Bristol Beaufighter torpedo bomber of No. 144 Squadron, after a crash landing at Dallachy following a sortie to attack a German destroyer, February 1945

In Operation Orator, during September 1942, 32 Hampdens of No. 144 Squadron and the Australian No. 455 Squadron were sent to Murmansk in Northern Russia in order to support the Arctic convoy PQ 18, and to attack any German warships that might sortie from bases in Norway against the convoy. The squadron lost five Hampdens on the flight to Russia, with a further four of No. 455 Squadron's also lost. The German surface warships did not attack PQ 18, and the squadron's personnel returned to Britain aboard a cruiser in October, leaving its aircraft behind to be handed over to the Soviets.

In January 1943 the squadron converted to the more capable Bristol Beaufighter, staying in the torpedo bomber role. After working up, it transferred to Algeria in June 1943, flying anti-shipping strikes over the Mediterranean until it returned to the United Kingdom in August. It continued anti-shipping operations over the North Sea from RAF Wick in Scotland, moving to RAF Davidstow Moor in Cornwall in May 1944 in preparation for Operation Overlord, the Allied invasion of Normandy, where it was tasked with protecting the invasion forces from German E-boats. It moved to RAF Strubby in Lincolnshire in July for operations against E-boats and German convoys off the Dutch coast. In September it moved to Banff, Aberdeenshire as part of the Banff Strike Wing for operations off Norway. In January 1945, the squadron abandoned the torpedo role, concentrating on flak suppression for the Strike Wing. It disbanded on 25 May 1945 at RAF Dallachy.

No. 144 Squadron was represented in the Great Escape from Stalag Luft 3 by Flight Lt. R.S.A. Churchill. Churchill was one of escapees that was not executed by the SS and was the last man living of those that survived.

=== Missiles ===
On 1 December 1959, the squadron reformed at RAF North Luffenham in Rutland, equipped with three Thor Intermediate-range ballistic missiles, supplied by the United States under Project Emily. The missiles were operated under a dual key system, with the British in control of the launch sequence, and the Americans responsible for arming the missiles nuclear warhead, giving each nation a veto on using the missiles. The squadron, along with the rest of the Thor force, was brought to full readiness during the Cuban Missile Crisis. The squadron disbanded on 23 August 1963.
