= Jack Davenport (air force officer) =

Australian air force officer and business executive

Jack Davenport AC DSO DFC & Bar GM
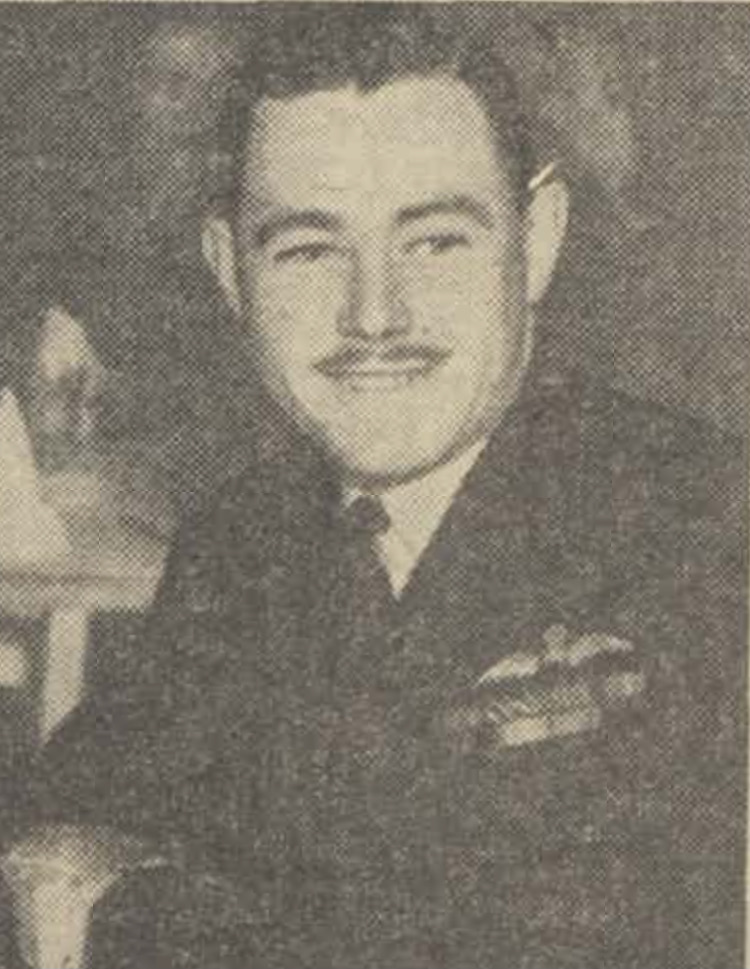
- Davenport in 1946

Member of the Reserve Bank of Australia
- In office 16 September 1977 – 29 September 1992

Personal details
- Born: 9 June 1920 Rose Bay, New South Wales, Australia
- Died: 2 January 1996 (aged 75) Camperdown, New South Wales, Australia
- Education: North Bondi Public School; Sydney Boys High School
- Occupation: Air force officer; business executive
- Civilian awards: Companion of the Order of Australia

Military service
- Allegiance: Australia
- Branch/service: Citizen Military Forces; Royal Australian Air Force
- Years of service: 1939–1946
- Rank: Wing Commander
- Unit: 30th Battalion (New South Wales Scottish Regiment) (1939–40)
- Commands: No. 455 Squadron RAAF (1943–44)
- Battles/wars: Second World War; Operation Orator
- Military awards: Distinguished Service Order; Distinguished Flying Cross & Bar; George Medal; Mentioned in Despatches

Jack Napier Davenport, AC, DSO, DFC & Bar, GM (9 June 1920 – 2 January 1996) was an Australian air force officer and business executive.

== Early life ==
Davenport was born in the Sydney suburb of Rose Bay, New South Wales in 1920. He attended North Bondi Public School and then Sydney Boys High School. He commenced employment with the Commonwealth Bank as a clerk in 1936.

== Military career ==
After joining the Citizen Military Forces, Davenport was posted to the 30th Battalion (New South Wales Scottish Regiment) in 1939. At the outbreak of the Second World War, Davenport became a sergeant instructor training recruits for the Second Australian Imperial Force but later joined the Royal Australian Air Force (RAAF) in January 1941, qualifying as a pilot under the Empire Air Training Scheme.

Commissioned in 1941 and promoted to flying officer in March 1942, Davenport joined the RAAF's No. 455 Squadron, flying Handley Page Hampden bombers in raids on Germany and carrying out anti-shipping strikes after the squadron transferred to RAF Coastal Command.

Davenport was promoted to acting flight lieutenant in May 1942 and then to acting squadron leader in October 1942.

In May 1943, Davenport received the Distinguished Flying Cross in recognition of his leadership and operational skills. He was later promoted to acting wing commander and appointed commanding officer of the squadron as they oversaw the conversion from Hampden bombers to Bristol Beaufighters.

He was awarded the Distinguished Service Order in June 1944 and in September 1944, a medal bar was added to his Distinguished Flying Cross.

After risking his life to rescue one of his pilots from a crashed Beaufighter in September 1944, Davenport was awarded the George Medal in 1945.

In October 1944, he was posted to No. 18 Group RAF headquarters in Dunfermline in Scotland to plan anti-shipping operations, after which he was ordered by Coastal Command to assess the effectiveness of its attacks in parts of Europe such as Norway.

During his service overseas, Davenport married Sheila McDavid at St Cuthbert's Church in Saltcoats in Scotland on 8 January 1944. Davenport returned to Sydney with his new wife and a baby son in March 1946.

Davenport finished his service with the RAAF in May 1946.

== Business career ==
Following his service with the air force, Davenport was offered an executive position with Concrete Industries (Monier) Ltd. He oversaw the company's successful expansion into overseas operations and served as managing director from 1970 to 1982.

From the 1970s to the 1990s, Davenport served on numerous boards, councils and committees in various capacities. These included the Royal Australian Air Force Association, Australian Gas Light Company, Reserve Bank of Australia, Australian War Memorial, Qantas, Mount Isa Mines, Dalgety & Co and the New South Wales Independent Commission Against Corruption.

For his service to business and industry, Davenport was made an Officer of the Order of Australia in the 1981 Queen's Birthday Honours. Ten years later, he was promoted to a Companion of the Order of Australia in the 1991 Queen's Birthday Honours.

In 1982, Davenport was awarded the Sir John Storey Medal from the Australian Institute of Management.

Davenport also established a Charolais cattle stud on his property at Ebor.

== Death ==
Davenport died in a Camperdown Hospital late on 1 January 1996. However, his death is officially listed as 2 January 1996.

== Legacy ==
There are two portraits of Davenport housed in the Australian War Memorial in Canberra, by artists Dennis Adams and Harold Freeman.

In 2009, Kristen Alexander authored a biography entitled Jack Davenport: Beaufighter Leader.
