= RAF Banff =

Former Royal Air Force station in Aberdeenshire, Scotland

RAF Banff
- Near Boyndie, Aberdeenshire in Scotland

Site information
- Type: Royal Air Force station
- Owner: Air Ministry
- Operator: Royal Air Force
- Controlled by: RAF Flying Training Command; 1943–44; RAF Coastal Command; 1944– * No. 18 Group RAF

Location
- Shown within Aberdeenshire RAF Banff (the United Kingdom)
- Coordinates: 57°40′00″N 002°38′24″W

Site history
- Built: 1942/43
- In use: April 1943 – 1946
- Battles/wars: European theatre of World War II

Airfield information
- Elevation: 250 feet (76 m) AMSL
Runways
Direction	Length and surface
06/24	4,200 feet (1,280 m) Concrete
12/30	6,000 feet (1,829 m) Concrete
18/36	4,200 feet (1,280 m) Concrete

Royal Air Force Banff or more simply RAF Banff is a former Royal Air Force station located 4 miles (6 km) west of Banff, Aberdeenshire, Scotland and 14 miles (23 km) northeast of Keith, Moray.

== History ==
The airfield was sited on land belonging to the Earls of Seafield since the 16th century. Construction of the airfield began in the middle of 1942. After it was turned down by RAF Bomber Command, it was officially opened in April 1943 as an airfield for the use of No. 14 (Pilots) Advanced Flying Unit RAF of RAF Flying Training Command. This unit used the airfield until August 1944, when it was disbanded, and the airfield was handed over to RAF Coastal Command.

One notable occurrence at RAF Banff in 1944 is that of Squadron Leader Cameron Martin, when his De Havilland Mosquito suffered a wing strike in high winds. The aircraft suffered major damage, but Martin and the other crew member survived with minor injuries and returned to their duties the next day.

The following squadrons were posted here at some point:

- No. 14 Squadron RAF
- No. 65 (East India) Squadron RAF
- No. 279 Squadron RAF
- No. 281 Squadron RAF
- No. 334 (Norwegian) Squadron RAF
- No. 489 Squadron RNZAF
- RAF Banff Strike Wing; Beaufighter and Mosquito squadrons
  - No. 143 Squadron RAF
  - No. 144 Squadron RAF
  - No. 235 Squadron RAF
  - No. 248 Squadron RAF
  - No. 333 (Norwegian) Squadron RAF
  - No. 404 Squadron RCAF

Units

- No. 14 (Pilots) Advanced Flying Unit RAF (May 1943 - September 1944)
- No. 1512 (Beam Approach Training) Flight RAF (May 1943 - August 1944)
- Aberdeen University Air Squadron (1945)
- No. 2749 Squadron RAF Regiment
- No. 2848 Squadron RAF Regiment

== Current use ==
The site is now Boyndie Wind Farm. A grass runway has been established at the Eastern end, operating as Boyndie Airstrip.

A memorial to the Banff Strike Wing was unveiled on 28 September 1989 at Banff, with Gage Sise, the former commander of No. 248 Squadron, in attendance.

== See also ==
- List of former Royal Air Force stations
