= No. 455 Squadron RAAF =

Royal Australian Air Force squadron

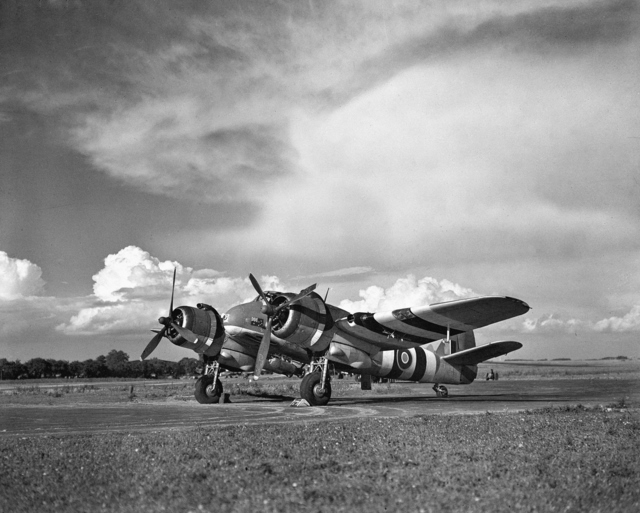
- A No. 455 Squadron Beaufighter in 1944
- Active: 23 May 1941 – 26 May 1945
- Country: Australia
- Allegiance: United Kingdom
- Branch: Royal Australian Air Force
- Role: Bomber; Torpedo bomber
- Part of: No. 5 Group, Bomber Command (Jun 1941 – Apr 1942)
- Mottos: Strike and strike again
- Battle honours: English Channel and North Sea, 1939–1945; Baltic, 1939–1945; Fortress Europe, 1940–1944; France and Germany, 1944–1945; Ruhr, 1940–1945; Berlin, 1940–1945; German Ports, 1940–1945; Normandy, 1944; Arctic, 1940–1945; Russia, 1941–1945

Insignia
- Squadron badge heraldry: In front of two battle axes in saltire a winged helmet
- Squadron codes: UB (Jun 1941 – Aug 1943, Jul 1944 – May 1945); 2 (Aug 1943 – Jul 1944)

Aircraft flown
- Attack: Bristol Beaufighter
- Bomber: Handley Page Hampden

No. 455 Squadron was a Royal Australian Air Force (RAAF) torpedo bomber squadron during World War II and became famous as part of the "Anzac Strike Wing" that was formed from Australian and New Zealand squadrons. Raised in early 1941, mainly from Australian personnel, the squadron served over Europe during the war, operating from various bases in the United Kingdom; it also briefly sent a detachment to the Soviet Union in 1942. Operating Handley Page Hampdens and Bristol Beaufighters, the squadron mainly undertook anti-shipping and anti-submarine operations during the war. It was disbanded in May 1945 following the cessation of hostilities against Germany.

== History ==
No. 455 Squadron was formed on 23 May 1941 as an Article XV squadron and officially raised at Williamtown, New South Wales. Established under the Empire Air Training Scheme, the squadron was formed for service in Europe with the Royal Air Force and although nominally an Australian squadron, its personnel were drawn from a number of Commonwealth countries including Britain, Canada, New Zealand and Rhodesia. While the main body waited to be shipped to the UK, other Commonwealth personnel, drawn mainly from the RAF, concentrated RAF Swinderby, in Lincolnshire and on 6 June 1941 the squadron was formally established.

The squadron received Hampden bombers and the bulk of the Australian personnel arrived on 1 September 1941, having departed Australia on 15 June. Initially assigned to No. 5 Group RAF, Bomber Command in a bomber role, its first operation took place while the squadron was still forming, when a single Hampden attacked Frankfurt at night on 29 August. In doing so, according to the Australian War Memorial, the squadron had the distinction of becoming the "first Australian squadron to bomb Germany". Following this, the squadron increased its operational tempo, undertaking several mine laying operations off the coast of occupied France, as well attacking industrial targets in Germany.

In February 1942, the squadron took part in an unsuccessful attack on the German battleships Scharnhorst and Gneisenau, before being re-roled as a torpedo-bomber squadron and transferred to RAF Coastal Command on 26 April 1942.

In Operation Orator, the squadron was deployed briefly to Vaenga airfield in the Soviet Union in September 1942. The detachment was to operate in support of convoys bound for Russia, which were at the time suffering heavy losses. However, three of the 16 Hampdens were lost prior to arrival, while after completing one anti-shipping sweep the remaining aircraft were handed over to the Soviet Air Force with the RAAF crews instructing the Soviets on their operation. Following the completion of this task the squadron returned to RAF Sumburgh in October, where they received replacement aircraft.

No. 455 Squadron continued to be employed in largely uneventful anti-shipping and anti-submarine patrols during this time. On 28 January 1943 seven aircraft from Nos. 455 and 487 Squadrons sank a 3,570-tonne merchant ship with torpedoes; while a 6,018-tonne merchantman was sunk near Egero Island on 12 May. Further success followed, with a Hampden destroying the German submarine U-227 north of the Shetland Islands on 30 April. Moving to RAF Leuchars in Scotland, the squadron was re-equipped with Beaufighters in October 1943 and operated against German shipping off Norway and in the Baltic Sea until the end of the war, forming the "Anzac Strike Wing" with No. 489 Squadron, Royal New Zealand Air Force. The squadron moved to RAF Langham in Norfolk in April 1944, subsequently providing flak suppression for No. 489 Squadron's torpedo carrying Beaufighters. Commencing operations on 6 May a number of enemy ships were attacked, successfully sinking one. During these operations the Australians faced heavy naval anti-aircraft fire as well as enemy fighters. Often attacking targets in narrow Norwegian fiords, they suffered heavy casualties.

In October 1944, the squadron moved to RAF Dallachy, in Scotland. On 8 November 1944 six No. 455 Squadron Beaufighters took part in an attack on German shipping in Midgulen Fiord, sinking two ships despite heavy anti-aircraft fire. Anti-shipping strikes continued into 1945, and saw the destruction of a number of vessels. The squadron moved to RAF Thornaby, from where they were involved in attacks on German shipping in the Baltic Sea. The squadron's final operation of the war was flown on 3 May 1945, when they attacked two German minesweepers in concert with New Zealand aircraft which sunk a tanker. No. 455 Squadron was disbanded on 25 May, while at Thornaby. Australian losses amongst the squadron's personnel during the war amounted to 91 killed. Between April 1942 and the end of the war, it was credited with sinking 18 vessels: one U-boat, 10 merchantmen, three escorts and four minesweepers.

== Aircraft operated ==
No. 455 Squadron RAAF operated the following aircraft:

From	To	Aircraft	Version
July 1941	April 1942	Handley Page Hampden	B.Mk.I
April 1942	December 1943	Handley Page Hampden	TB.Mk.I
December 1943	May 1945	Bristol Beaufighter	Mk.X

== Squadron bases ==
No. 455 Squadron RAAF operated from the following bases and airfields:

From	To	Base	Remark
23 May 1941	15 June 1941	Williamtown, New South Wales	Australian formation
15 June 1941	1 September 1941	en route to the UK	
6 June 1941	8 February 1942	RAF Swinderby, Lincolnshire	UK formation
8 February 1942	28 April 1942	RAF Wigsley, Nottinghamshire	
28 April 1942	14 April 1944	RAF Leuchars, Fife, Scotland	Dets. at RAF Sumburgh, Shetland Islands, Scotland; Vaenga, USSR; RAF Benbecula, Outer Hebrides, Scotland; RAF Tain, Moray, Scotland and RAF Wick, Caithness, Scotland
14 April 1944	20 October 1944	RAF Langham, Norfolk	Dets. at RAF Thorney Island, West Sussex and RAF Manston, Kent
20 October 1944	25 May 1945	RAF Dallachy, Moray, Scotland	

== Commanding officers ==
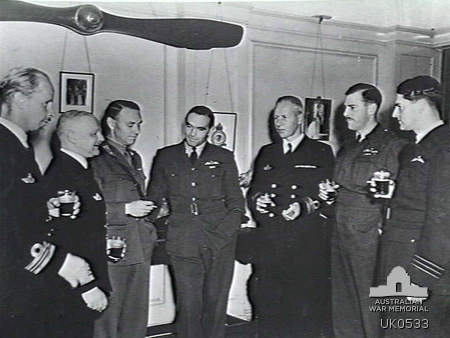
Wing Commander R. Holmes, commanding officer of No. 455 Squadron (far right), with Norwegian and RAF officers at Leuchars, September 1943.

No. 455 Squadron was commanded by the following officers:

From	To	Name
23 May 1941		Squadron Leader J.H.W. Lawson (acting)
	1 July 1941	Wing Commander D.J. French
1 July 1941	12 December 1941	Wing Commander J.E.C.G.F Gyll-Murray
12 December 1941	6 February 1943	Wing Commander G.M. Lindeman
6 February 1943	29 November 1943	Wing Commander R. Holmes
29 November 1943	23 October 1944	Wing Commander J.N. Davenport, DSO, DFC & Bar
23 October 1944	25 May 1945	Wing Commander C.G. Milson, DSO & Bar, DFC & Bar

== Notes ==
=== Bibliography ===
- Bowyer, Michael J.F.; Rawlings, John D.R. (1979). Squadron Codes, 1937–56. Cambridge, UK: Patrick Stephens. ISBN 0-85059-364-6.
- Eather, Steve (1995). Flying Squadrons of the Australian Defence Force. Weston Creek, Australian Capital Territory: Aerospace Publications. ISBN 1-875671-15-3.
- Flintham, Vic; Thomas, Andrew (2003). Combat Codes: A Full Explanation and Listing of British, Commonwealth and Allied Air Force Unit Codes Since 1938. Shrewsbury, Shropshire, UK: Airlife Publishing. ISBN 1-84037-281-8.
- Gordon, Ian (1995). Strike and Strike Again: 455 Squadron RAAF. Belconnen, Australian Capital Territory: Banner Books. ISBN 1-875593-09-8.
- Halley, James J. (1988). The Squadrons of the Royal Air Force & Commonwealth, 1918–1988. Tonbridge, Kent, UK: Air-Britain (Historians). ISBN 0-85130-164-9.
- Jefford, C.G. (2001). RAF Squadrons: A Comprehensive Record of the Movement and Equipment of all RAF Squadrons and Their Antecedents Since 1912. Shrewsbury, Shropshire, UK: Airlife Publishing. ISBN 1-84037-141-2.
- Moyes, Philip J.R. (1976) [1964]. Bomber Squadrons of the RAF and Their Aircraft. London: Macdonald and Jane's (Publishers). ISBN 0-354-01027-1.
- Raebel, Geoffrey W. (1997). The RAAF in Russia: 455 Squadron, 1942. Loftus, New South Wales: Australian Military History Publications. ISBN 0-9586693-5-X.
- Rawlings, John D.R. (1982). Coastal, Support and Special Squadrons of the RAF and Their Aircraft. London: Jane's Publishing Company. ISBN 0-7106-0187-5.
