= RAF Langham =

Former RAF station in Norfolk, England

RAF Langham
- Langham, Norfolk in England
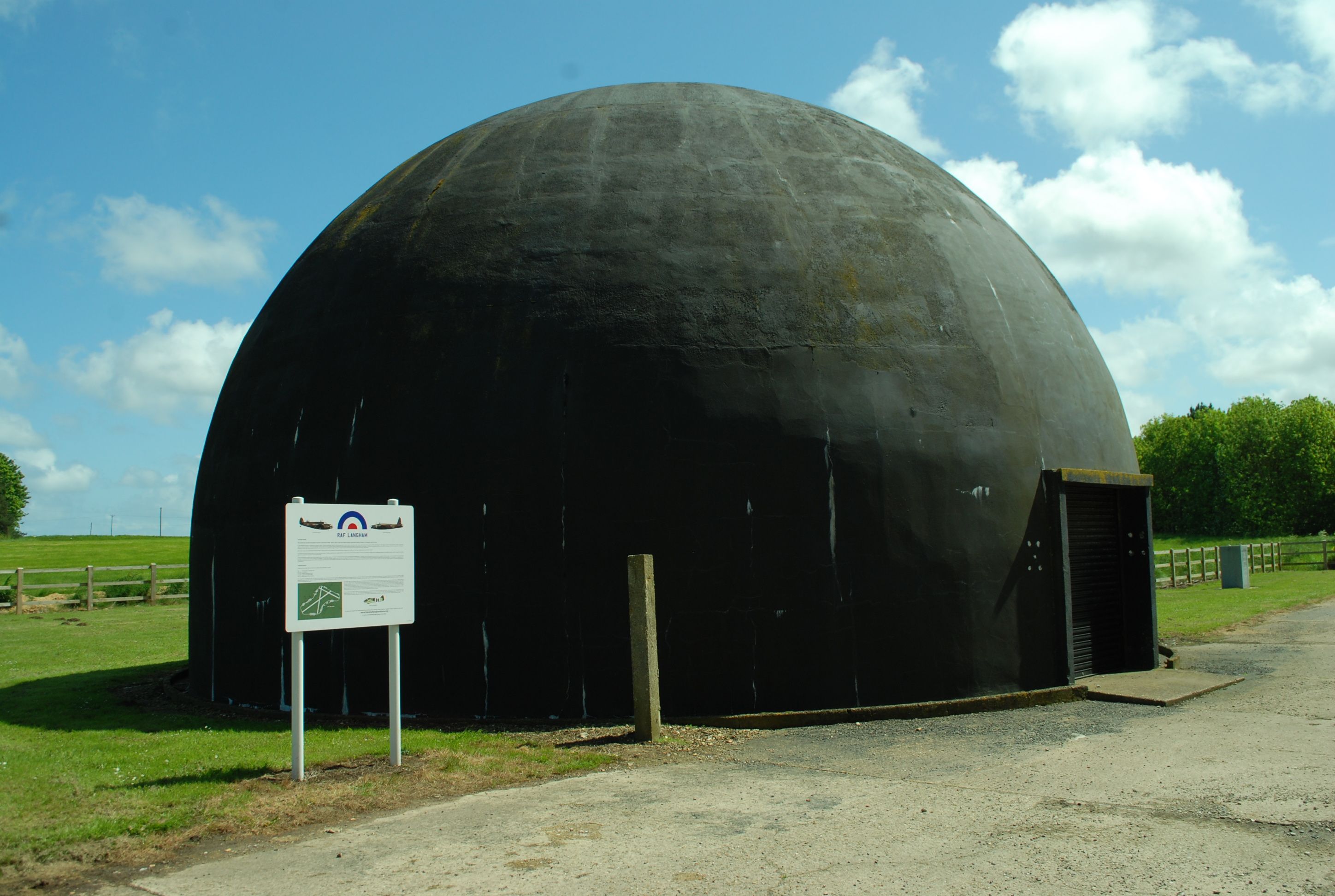
- WWII ground-to-air training dome

Site information
- Type: Royal Air Force station
- Owner: Air Ministry
- Operator: Royal Air Force
- Controlled by: RAF Coastal Command * No. 16 Group RAF

Location
- Location within Norfolk
- Coordinates: 52.938°N 0.958°E

Site history
- Built: 1940
- In use: 1940 - 1961
- Battles/wars: European theatre of World War II

Airfield information
- Elevation: 18 metres (59 ft) AMSL
Runways
Direction	Length and surface
00/00	1,800 metres (5,906 ft) Concrete/Tarmac
00/00	1,250 metres (4,101 ft) Concrete/Tarmac
00/00	1,250 metres (4,101 ft) Concrete/Tarmac

Royal Air Force Langham or more simply RAF Langham is a former Royal Air Force station, located at Langham, 27 miles (43 km) northwest of Norwich, in the English county of Norfolk. It operated between 1940 and 1961. The airfield was the most northerly of the wartime RAF airfields in Norfolk and its position, just 3.3 miles (5.3 km) from the North Sea at Blakeney, made it a suitable site for RAF Coastal Command aircraft.

The airfield was built during the early months of the Second World War as a dispersal and satellite station to RAF Bircham Newton. It became operational in the summer of 1940.

== History ==
The airfield was originally laid out with three grass runways. The station became fully self-supporting in 1942, when it was upgraded with three concrete runways (tar-covered), three T2 type and four blister hangars, an encircling perimeter track and 36 spectacle-shape hardstandings, plus a Type 12779/41 control tower and normal Mk 2 approach lights for night operations.

Primarily used by RAF Coastal Command throughout the war, it was placed on Care and Maintenance in 1947, but reactivated during the Korean War. It was later used as an emergency landing strip for RAF Sculthorpe, before its final closure in 1961.

=== Based units ===
The following units were based at Langham:

- Anzac Strike Wing (No. 455 Squadron RAAF and No. 489 Squadron RNZAF)
- No. 1 Anti-Aircraft Co-operation Unit RAF 'K' Flight
- No. 1 Anti-Aircraft Co-operation Unit RAF 'M' Flight
- No. 2 Anti-Aircraft Practice Camp RAF
- Detachment from No. 2 Armament Practice Camp RAF
- No. 2 Civilian Anti-Aircraft Co-operation Unit RAF
- No. 24 Air Crew Holding Unit RAF
- No. 254 Squadron RAF
- No. 280 Squadron RAF
- No. 521 Squadron RAF
- No. 524 Squadron RAF
- No. 612 Squadron RAF
- 819 Naval Air Squadron
- 827 Naval Air Squadron
- No. 1402 Meteorological Flight RAF
- No. 1561 Meteorological Flight RAF
- No. 1562 Meteorological Flight RAF
- No. 1611 (Anti-Aircraft Co-operation) Flight RAF
- No. 1612 (Anti-Aircraft Co-operation) Flight RAF
- No. 1626 (Anti-Aircraft Co-operation) Flight RAF
- No. 2705 Squadron RAF Regiment
- No. 2731 Squadron RAF Regiment
- No. 2765 Squadron RAF Regiment
- No. 2776 Squadron RAF Regiment
- No. 2802 Squadron RAF Regiment
- No. 2809 Squadron RAF Regiment
- No. 2820 Squadron RAF Regiment
- No. 2848 Squadron RAF Regiment
- No. 4044 Anti-Aircraft Flight RAF Regiment
- No. 4054 Anti-Aircraft Flight RAF Regiment
- No. 4149 Anti-Aircraft Flight RAF Regiment
- Coastal Command Fighter Affiliation Training Unit RAF

== Notable operations and events ==
On 2 October 1944 six Bristol Beaufighters of Coastal Command took off from Langham to carry out a night patrol along the Frisian Islands off the coast of the Netherlands. Their task was to randomly attack any enemy shipping encountered there. One of the aircraft (NT 909) was piloted by New Zealander Warrant Officer Douglas Mann with English navigator Flight Sergeant Donald Kennedy. Close to the island of Borkum the plane attacked a convoy, but in poor visibility struck an unknown obstacle causing Mann to lose control. The convoy's escort opened fire on the stricken plane shooting it down and, after some difficulty, Mann and Kennedy took to their rescue dinghy.

After several abortive rescue attempts the airmen were finally rescued by High Speed Launch 2679, stationed at Gorleston-on-Sea, on 10 October after being in the sea for eight days. Both men suffered from acute hypothermia and immersion foot. They were taken to Great Yarmouth Naval Hospital, eventually making a full recovery. Mann returned to 489 Squadron and was awarded the Distinguished Flying Cross.

== Current use ==
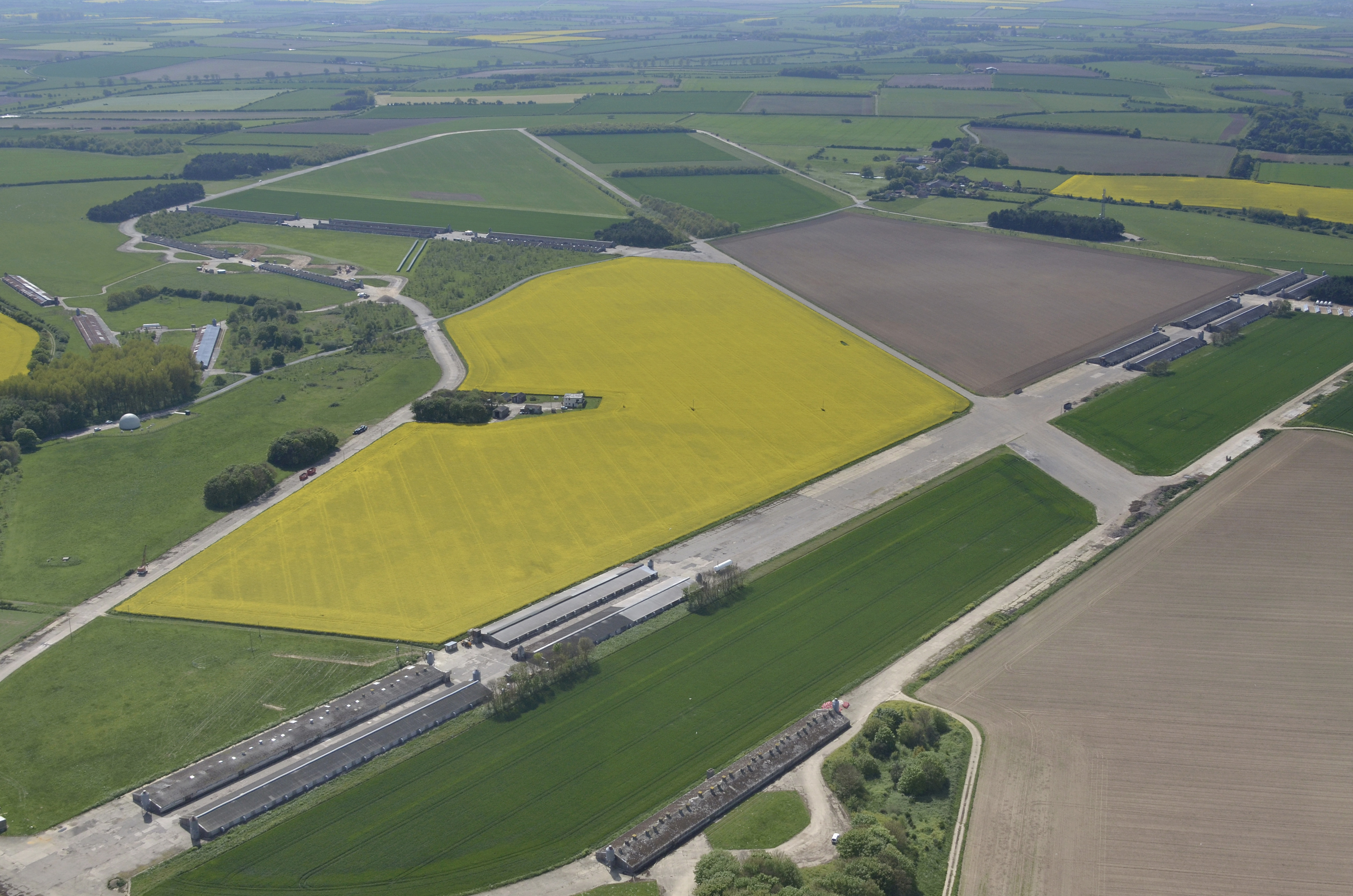
Turkey sheds on the runway

The station was purchased by Bernard Matthews Ltd, who constructed turkey sheds on the runways. This has preserved large sections of the runways.

A small aircraft repair and maintenance facility is based in buildings to the south side of the airfield, and uses the southern perimeter track and adjacent grass area for flying operations.

Surviving buildings on the site include the control tower and a dome trainer building used for the instruction of ground-to-air anti-aircraft gunnery. Langham Dome, which sits on the edge of the former base, is one of only a half dozen such sites surviving in the United Kingdom. It was built in 1942. Film of enemy aircraft was projected onto its walls for target practice. The structure has been restored and a museum installed with funding from English Heritage and the National Heritage Lottery Fund. In 2015 a documentary about the dome was broadcast by BBC One.

== See also ==
- List of former Royal Air Force stations
