= RAF Coastal Command order of battle during World War II =

This article lists the order of battle of RAF Coastal Command throughout the Second World War in the European Theatre of World War II.

== 3 September 1939 ==
No. 15 Group RAF (GR), under command of Air Commodore R.G. Parry, DSO

Squadron	Type of Aircraft	Station
No. 204 Squadron RAF	Short Sunderland	RAF Mount Batten
No. 210 Squadron RAF	Short Sunderland	RAF Pembroke Dock
No. 217 Squadron RAF	Avro Anson	RAF Warmwell
No. 228 Squadron RAF	Short Sunderland	RAF Pembroke Dock
No. 502 (Ulster) Squadron RAF	Avro Anson	RAF Aldergrove

No. 16 Group RAF (GR), under command of Air Commodore R.L.G. Marix, DSO

Squadron	Type of Aircraft	Station
No. 22 Squadron RAF	Vickers Vildebeest	RAF Thorney Island
No. 42 Squadron RAF	Vickers Vildebeest	RAF Bircham Newton
No. 48 Squadron RAF	Avro Anson	RAF Thorney Island
No. 206 Squadron RAF	Avro Anson	RAF Bircham Newton
No. 500 (County of Kent) Squadron RAF	Avro Anson	RAF Detling

No. 17 Group RAF (T), under command of Air Commodore T.E.B. Howe, CBE, AFC

Squadron	Type of aircraft	Station
Torpedo Training Unit RAF	various	RAF Gosport
No. 2 Anti-Aircraft Co-operation Unit RAF	various	RAF Gosport
School of General Reconnaissance RAF	Avro Anson	RAF Thorney Island
Seaplane Training Squadron RAF	various	RAF Calshot

No. 18 Group RAF (GR), under command of Air Vice Marshal C.D. Breese, CB, AFC

Squadron	Type of aircraft	Station
No. 201 Squadron RAF	Saro London	RAF Sullom Voe
No. 209 Squadron RAF	Supermarine Stranraer	RAF Invergordon
No. 220 Squadron RAF	Avro Anson	RAF Thornaby
No. 224 Squadron RAF	Lockheed Hudson	RAF Leuchars
No. 233 Squadron RAF	Lockheed Hudson	RAF Leuchars
No. 240 Squadron RAF	Saro London	RAF Invergordon
No. 269 Squadron RAF	Avro Anson	RAF Montrose
No. 608 (North Riding) Squadron RAF	Avro Anson	RAF Thornaby
No. 612 (County of Aberdeen) Squadron RAF	Avro Anson	RAF Dyce

== 1 November 1940 ==
No. 15 Group RAF (GR), under command of Air Commodore R.G. Parry, DSO

Squadron	Type of Aircraft	Station
No. 48 Squadron RAF	Avro Anson	RAF Hooton Park
No. 209 Squadron RAF	Saro Lerwick	RAF Pembroke Dock
No. 217 Squadron RAF	Avro Anson/Bristol Beaufort	RAF St Eval
No. 236 Squadron RAF	Bristol Blenheim	RAF St Eval
No. 321 (Dutch) Squadron RAF	Avro Anson	RAF Carew Cheriton
No. 502 (Ulster) Squadron RAF	Blackburn Botha/Armstrong Whitworth Whitley	RAF Aldergrove
No. 10 Squadron RAAF	Short Sunderland	RAF Pembroke Dock

No. 16 Group RAF (GR), under command of Air Vice Marshal J.H.S. Tyssen, CB, DSO

Squadron	Type of Aircraft	Station
No. 22 Squadron RAF	Bristol Beaufort	RAF North Coates
No. 53 Squadron RAF	Bristol Blenheim	RAF Detling
No. 59 Squadron RAF	Bristol Blenheim	RAF Thorney Island
No. 206 Squadron RAF	Lockheed Hudson	RAF Bircham Newton
No. 220 Squadron RAF	Lockheed Hudson	RAF Thornaby
No. 235 Squadron RAF	Bristol Blenheim	RAF Bircham Newton
No. 500 (County of Kent) Squadron RAF	Avro Anson	RAF Detling
No. 608 (North Riding) Squadron RAF	Avro Anson/Blackburn Botha	RAF Thornaby

No. 17 Group RAF (T), under command of Air Commodore T.E.B. Howe, CBE, AFC

Squadron	Type of aircraft	Station
Torpedo Training Unit RAF	Bristol Beaufort	RAF Abbotsinch
No. 2 (Coastal) Operational Training Unit RAF	Bristol Blenheim/Avro Anson	RAF Catfoss
No. 3 (Coastal) Operational Training Unit RAF	various	RAF Chivenor
No. 1 Coast Artillery Co-operation Unit RAF	Bristol Blenheim	RAF Detling
No. 2 Anti-Aircraft Co-operation Unit RAF	various	RAF Gosport
No. 1 (Coastal) Operational Training Unit RAF	various	RAF Silloth
No. 3 School of General Reconnaissance RAF	Blackburn Botha	RAF Squires Gate
No. 4 (Coastal) Operational Training Unit	various	RAF Stranraer

No. 18 Group RAF (GR), under command of Air Vice Marshal C.D. Breese, CB, AFC

Squadron	Type of Aircraft	Station
No. 42 Squadron RAF	Bristol Beaufort	RAF Wick
No. 98 Squadron RAF	Fairey Battle	RAF Kaldadarnes
No. 201 Squadron RAF	Short Sunderland	RAF Sullom Voe
No. 204 Squadron RAF	Short Sunderland	RAF Sullom Voe
No. 210 Squadron RAF	Short Sunderland	RAF Oban
No. 224 Squadron RAF	Lockheed Hudson	RAF Leuchars
No. 233 Squadron RAF	Lockheed Hudson	RAF Leuchars
No. 240 Squadron RAF	Supermarine Stranraer	RAF Stranraer
No. 248 Squadron RAF	Bristol Blenheim	RAF Dyce
No. 254 Squadron RAF	Bristol Blenheim	RAF Dyce
No. 320 (Dutch) Squadron RAF	Avro Anson/Lockheed Hudson	RAF Leuchars
No. 612 (County of Aberdeen) Squadron RAF	Avro Anson	RAF Dyce

No. 200 Group RAF (Coastal), under command of Group Captain A.D. Rogers, CBE, AFC

Squadron	Type of Aircraft	Station
No. 202 Squadron RAF	Saro London/Fairey Swordfish	RAF Gibraltar

== 12 February 1942 ==
No. 15 Group RAF (GR), under command of Air Vice Marshal J.M. Robb, CB, DSO, DFC, AFC

Squadron	Type of aircraft	Station
No. 53 Squadron RAF	Lockheed Hudson	RAF Limavady
No. 120 Squadron RAF	Consolidated Liberator	RAF Nutts Corner
No. 143 Squadron RAF	Bristol Blenheim	RAF Aldergrove
No. 201 Squadron RAF	Short Sunderland	RAF Castle Archdale
No. 206 Squadron RAF	Lockheed Hudson	RAF Aldergrove
No. 210 Squadron RAF	Consolidated Catalina	RAF Oban
No. 220 Squadron RAF	Boeing Fortress	RAF Nutts Corner
No. 228 Squadron RAF	Short Sunderland	RAF Stranraer
No. 240 Squadron RAF	Consolidated Catalina	RAF Castle Archdale
No. 1402 (Meteorological) Flight RAF	Supermarine Spitfire/Gloster Gladiator	RAF Aldergrove
No. 1405 (Meteorological) Flight RAF	Bristol Blenheim/Lockheed Hudson	RAF Aldergrove

No. 16 Group RAF (GR), under command of Air Commodore I.T. Lloyd, CBE

Squadron	Type of aircraft	Station
No. 22 Squadron RAF	Bristol Beaufort	RAF Thorney Island
No. 59 Squadron RAF	Lockheed Hudson	RAF North Coates
No. 217 Squadron RAF	Bristol Beaufort	RAF Thorney Island
No. 233 Squadron RAF	Lockheed Hudson	RAF Thorney Island
No. 248 Squadron RAF	Bristol Beaufighter	RAF Bircham Newton
No. 279 Squadron RAF	Lockheed Hudson	RAF Bircham Newton
No. 280 Squadron RAF	Avro Anson	RAF Detling
No. 407 (Demon) Squadron RCAF	Lockheed Hudson	RAF North Coates
No. 415 (Swordfish) Squadron RCAF	Handley Page Hampden/Bristol Beaufort	RAF Thorney Island
No. 500 (County of Kent) Squadron RAF	Lockheed Hudson	RAF Bircham Newton
No. 502 (Ulster) Squadron RAF	Armstrong Whitworth Whitley	RAF Bircham Newton
No. 1401 (Meteorological) Flight RAF	Bristol Blenheim	RAF Bircham Newton
No. 1 Photographic Reconnaissance Unit RAF	Supermarine Spitfire	RAF Benson

No. 17 Group RAF (T), under command of Air Commodore H.G. Smart, CBE, DFC, AFC

Squadron	Type of Aircraft	Station
Numerous Training Units	N/A	

No. 18 Group RAF (GR), under command of Air Vice Marshal A. Durston, CB, AFC

Squadron	Aircraft	Station
No. 42 Squadron RAF	Bristol Beaufort	RAF Leuchars
No. 48 Squadron RAF	Lockheed Hudson	RAF Wick
No. 235 Squadron RAF	Bristol Beaufighter	RAF Dyce
No. 320 (Dutch) Squadron RAF	Lockheed Hudson	RAF Leuchars
No. 404 (Buffalo) Squadron RCAF	Bristol Blenheim	RAF Sumburgh
No. 413 (Tusker) Squadron RCAF	Consolidated Catalina	RAF Sullom Voe
No. 489 (RNZAF) Squadron	Bristol Blenheim	RAF Leuchars
No. 608 (North Riding) Squadron RAF	Lockheed Hudson	RAF Wick
No. 1406 (Meteorological) Flight RAF	Bristol Blenheim	RAF Wick
No. 1408 (Meteorological) Flight RAF	Lockheed Hudson	RAF Wick

No. 19 Group RAF (GR), under command of Air Commodore G.R. Bromet, CBE, DSO

Squadron	Aircraft	Station
No. 22 Squadron RAF	Bristol Beaufort	RAF St Eval
No. 86 Squadron RAF	Bristol Beaufort	RAF St Eval
No. 209 Squadron RAF	Consolidated Catalina	RAF Pembroke Dock
No. 217 Squadron RAF	Bristol Beaufort	RAF St Eval
No. 224 Squadron RAF	Lockheed Hudson	RAF St Eval
No. 254 Squadron RAF	Bristol Blenheim	RAF Carew Cheriton
No. 502 (Ulster) Squadron RAF	Armstrong Whitworth Whitley	RAF St Eval
No. 10 Squadron RAAF	Short Sunderland	RAF Mount Batten
No. 1404 (Meteorological) Flight RAF	Lockheed Hudson	RAF St Eval
No. 1417 (Leigh Light Trials) Flight RAF	Vickers Wellington	RAF Chivenor
No. 1 Photographic Reconnaissance Unit RAF	Bristol Blenheim	RAF St Eval (B Flight)

AHQ Gibraltar, under command of Air Commodore S.P. Simpson, CBE, MC

Squadron	Aircraft	Station
No. 202 Squadron RAF	Short Sunderland/Consolidated Catalina	RAF Gibraltar

AHQ Iceland, under command of Air Commodore W.H. Primrose, CBE, DFC

Squadron	Type of Aircraft	Station
No. 269 Squadron RAF	Lockheed Hudson	RAF Kaldadarnes
No. 330 (Norwegian) Squadron RAF	Lockheed Hudson	RAF Reykjavik
No. 612 (County of Aberdeen) Squadron RAF	Armstrong Whitworth Whitley	RAF Reykjavik
No. 1407 (Meteorological) Flight RAF	Lockheed Hudson	RAF Reykjavik
VP-73 (United States Navy)	Consolidated PBY Catalina	RAF Reykjavik

== 15 February 1943 ==
No. 15 Group RAF under command of Air Vice Marshal T.A. Langford-Sainsbury, OBE, DFC, AFC

Squadron	Type of aircraft	Station
No. 120 Squadron RAF	Consolidated Liberator	RAF Aldergrove
No. 201 Squadron RAF	Short Sunderland	RAF Castle Archdale
No. 206 Squadron RAF	Boeing Fortress	RAF Benbecula
No. 220 Squadron RAF	Boeing Fortress	RAF Aldergrove
No. 228 Squadron RAF	Short Sunderland	RAF Castle Archdale
No. 246 Squadron RAF	Short Sunderland	RAF Bowmore
No. 407 (Demon) Squadron RCAF	Vickers Wellington	RAF Chivenor
No. 422 Squadron RCAF	Short Sunderland	RAF Bowmore
No. 423 Squadron RCAF	Short Sunderland	RAF Castle Archdale
No. 1402 (Meteorological) Flight RAF	Gloster Gladiator/Supermarine Spitfire/Lockheed Hudson	RAF Aldergrove

No. 16 Group RAF, under command of Air Vice Marshal B.E. Baker, CB, DSO, MC, AFC

Squadron	Type of Aircraft	Station
No. 53 Squadron RAF	Lockheed Hudson	RAF Docking
No. 86 Squadron RAF	Consolidated Liberator	RAF Thorney Island
No. 143 Squadron RAF	Bristol Beaufighter	RAF North Coates
No. 236 Squadron RAF	Bristol Beaufighter	RAF North Coates
No. 254 Squadron RAF	Bristol Beaufighter	RAF North Coates
No. 320 (Dutch) Squadron RAF	Lockheed Hudson	RAF Bircham Newton
No. 407 (Demon) Squadron RCAF	Lockheed Hudson	RAF Docking
No. 521 (Meteorological) Squadron RAF	Supermarine Spitfire (Note: This unit was formed from No. 1401 (Meteorological) Flight in August 1942. One flight was equipped with Spitfire PR.IVs, one of Mosquito PR.IVs and one of Hudsons.)/de Havilland Mosquito/Lockheed Hudson	RAF Bircham Newton
No. 540 Squadron RAF	de Havilland Mosquito	RAF Benson
No. 541 Squadron RAF	Supermarine Spitfire (Note: 541, 542 and 543 Sqns were all formed from 1 PRU on 19 October 1942; each was equipped with the Spitfire PR.Mk.IV.)	RAF Benson
No. 542 Squadron RAF	Supermarine Spitfire	RAF Benson
No. 543 Squadron RAF	Supermarine Spitfire	RAF Benson
No. 544 Squadron RAF	Vickers Wellington/Supermarine Spitfire	RAF Benson
No. 833 Squadron FAA	Fairey Swordfish	RAF Thorney Island
No. 836 Squadron FAA	Fairey Swordfish	RAF Thorney Island

No. 17 Group RAF, under command of Air Commodore H.G. Smart, CBE, DFC, AFC

Squadron	Type of Aircraft	Station
Numerous Training Units	N/A	

No. 18 Group RAF, under command of Air Vice Marshal A.B. Ellwood, CB, DSC

Squadron	Type of Aircraft	Station
No. 144 Squadron RAF	Bristol Beaufighter	RAF Leuchars
No. 190 Squadron RAF	Consolidated Catalina	RAF Sullom Voe
No. 235 Squadron RAF	Bristol Beaufighter	RAF Leuchars
No. 455 Squadron RAAF	Handley Page Hampden	RAF Leuchars
No. 489 (RNZAF) Squadron	Handley Page Hampden	RAF Wick
No. 540 Squadron RAF	de Havilland Mosquito	RAF Leuchars
No. 547 Squadron RAF	Vickers Wellington	RAF Tain
No. 612 (County of Aberdeen) Squadron RAF	Armstrong Whitworth Whitley	RAF Wick
No. 1406 (Meteorological) Flight RAF	Supermarine Spitfire/Lockheed Hudson	RAF Wick
No. 1408 (Meteorological) Flight RAF	Handley Page Hampden	RAF Wick
No. 1477 (Norwegian) Flight RAF	Consolidated Catalina	RAF Woodhaven

No. 19 Group RAF, under command of Air Vice Marshal G.R. Bromet, CB, CBE, DSO

Squadron	Type of aircraft	Station
No. 58 Squadron RAF	Armstrong Whitworth Whitley/Handley Page Halifax	RAF Holmsley South
No. 59 Squadron RAF	Boeing Fortress	RAF Chivenor
No. 119 Squadron RAF	Consolidated Catalina	RAF Pembroke Dock
No. 172 Squadron RAF	Vickers Wellington	RAF Chivenor
No. 179 Squadron RAF	Vickers Wellington	RAF Skitten
No. 210 Squadron RAF	Consolidated Catalina	RAF Pembroke Dock
No. 224 Squadron RAF	Consolidated Liberator	RAF Beaulieu
No. 248 Squadron RAF	Bristol Beaufighter	RAF Predannack Down
304 Dywizjon Bombowy (Polish Air Forces)	Vickers Wellington	RAF Dale
No. 311 (Czechoslovak) Squadron RAF	Vickers Wellington	RAF Talbenny
No. 404 (Buffalo) Squadron RCAF	Bristol Beaufighter	RAF Chivenor
No. 405 (Vancouver) Squadron RCAF	Handley Page Halifax	RAF Beaulieu
No. 461 Squadron RAAF	Short Sunderland	RAF Hamworthy
No. 502 (Ulster) Squadron RAF	Armstrong Whitworth Whitley	RAF St Eval
No. 543 Squadron RAF	Supermarine Spitfire	RAF St Eval
No. 1404 (Meteorological) Flight RAF	Lockheed Hudson/Lockheed Ventura	RAF St Eval
No. 10 OTU	Armstrong Whitworth Whitley	RAF St Eval
No. 10 Squadron RAAF	Short Sunderland	RAF Mount Batten
No. 1 AS (Anti-Submarine) Squadron, USAAF	Consolidated B-24 Liberator	RAF St Eval
No. 2 AS (Anti-Submarine) Squadron, USAAF	Consolidated B-24 Liberator	RAF St Eval

AHQ Gibraltar, under command of Air Commodore S.P. Simpson, CBE, MC

Squadron	Type of aircraft	Station
No. 48 Squadron RAF	Lockheed Hudson	RAF Gibraltar (North Front)
No. 179 Squadron RAF	Vickers Wellington	RAF Gibraltar (North Front)
No. 202 Squadron RAF	Consolidated Catalina	RAF Gibraltar (Harbour)
No. 210 Squadron RAF	Consolidated Catalina	RAF Gibraltar (Harbour)
No. 233 Squadron RAF	Lockheed Hudson	RAF Gibraltar (North Front)
No. 544 Squadron RAF	Supermarine Spitfire	RAF Gibraltar (North Front)

AHQ Iceland, under command of Air Commodore K.B. Lloyd, AFC

Squadron	Type of Aircraft	Station
No. 120 Squadron RAF	Consolidated Liberator	RAF Reykjavik
No. 269 Squadron RAF	Lockheed Hudson	RAF Reykjavik
No. 330 (Norwegian) Squadron RAF	Northrop N-3PB	RAF Reykjavik
No. 1407 (Meteorological) Flight RAF	Lockheed Hudson	RAF Reykjavik
VP-84 U.S. Navy	Consolidated PBY Catalina	RAF Reykjavik

== 6 June 1944 ==
No. 15 Group RAF under command of Air Vice Marshal Sir Leonard Slatter, KBE, CB, DSC, DFC

Squadron	Type of aircraft	Station
No. 59 Squadron RAF	Consolidated Liberator	RAF Ballykelly
No. 120 Squadron RAF	Consolidated Liberator	RAF Ballykelly
No. 281 Squadron RAF	Vickers Warwick (ASR)	RAF Tiree
No. 422 Squadron RCAF	Short Sunderland	RAF Castle Archdale
No. 423 Squadron RCAF	Short Sunderland	RAF Castle Archdale
No. 518 Squadron RAF	Handley Page Halifax (Met)	RAF Tiree
No. 1402 (Meteorological) Flight RAF	Gloster Gladiator/Supermarine Spitfire	RAF Aldergrove

No. 16 Group RAF, under command of Air Vice Marshal F.L. Hopps, CB, CBE, AFC

Squadron	Type of Aircraft	Station
No. 143 Squadron RAF	Bristol Beaufighter	RAF Manston
No. 236 Squadron RAF	Bristol Beaufighter	RAF North Coates
No. 254 Squadron RAF	Bristol Beaufighter	RAF North Coates
No. 279 Squadron RAF	Lockheed Hudson (ASR)	RAF Bircham Newton
No. 280 Squadron RAF	Vickers Warwick (ASR)	RAF Strubby (Det. at RAF Thornaby)
No. 415 (Swordfish) Squadron RCAF	Lockheed Hudson	RAF Bircham Newton
No. 455 Squadron RAAF	Bristol Beaufighter	RAF Langham
No. 489 (RNZAF) Squadron	Bristol Beaufighter	RAF Langham
No. 521 (Meteorological) Squadron RAF	Lockheed Ventura/Gloster Gladiator	RAF Docking
No. 819 Squadron FAA	Fairey Swordfish	RAF Manston
No. 848 Squadron FAA	Grumman Avenger	RAF Manston
No. 854 Squadron FAA	Grumman Avenger	RAF Hawkinge
No. 855 Squadron FAA	Grumman Avenger	RAF Hawkinge
No. 1401 (Meteorological) Flight RAF	Supermarine Spitfire	RAF Manston

No. 17 Group RAF, under command of Air Commodore H.G. Smart, CBE, DFC, AFC

Squadron	Type of Aircraft	Station
No. 1674 Heavy Conversion Unit RAF		
Numerous Training Units	N/A	

No. 18 Group RAF, under command of Air Vice Marshal S.P. Simpson, CB, CBE, MC

Squadron	Type of Aircraft	Station
No. 86 Squadron RAF	Consolidated Liberator	RAF Tain
No. 210 Squadron RAF	Consolidated Catalina	RAF Sullom Voe
No. 281 Squadron RAF	Vickers Warwick (ASR)	RAF Gt Orton/RAF Wick/RAF Sumburgh (Dets.)
No. 330 Squadron RAF	Short Sunderland	RAF Sullom Voe
No. 333 Squadron RAF	de Havilland Mosquito/Consolidated Catalina	RAF Sumburgh/RAF Leuchars/RAF Woodhaven
No. 521 (Meteorological) Squadron RAF	Lockheed Ventura/Supermarine Spitfire	RAF Skitten
No. 1693 (General Reconnaissance) Flight RAF	Avro Anson	RAF Wick

No. 19 Group RAF, under command of Air Vice Marshal B.E. Baker, CB, DSO, MC, AFC

Squadron	Type of aircraft	Station
No. 53 Squadron RAF	Consolidated Liberator	RAF St Eval
No. 58 Squadron RAF	Handley Page Halifax	RAF St David's
No. 144 Squadron RAF	Bristol Beaufighter	RAF Davidstow Moor
No. 172 Squadron RAF	Vickers Wellington	RAF Chivenor
No. 179 Squadron RAF	Vickers Wellington	RAF Predannack
No. 201 Squadron RAF	Short Sunderland	RAF Pembroke Dock
No. 206 Squadron RAF	Consolidated Liberator	RAF St Eval
No. 224 Squadron RAF	Consolidated Liberator	RAF St Eval
No. 228 Squadron RAF	Short Sunderland	RAF Pembroke Dock
No. 235 Squadron RAF	Bristol Beaufighter	RAF Portreath
No. 248 Squadron RAF	de Havilland Mosquito	RAF Portreath
No. 282 Squadron RAF	Vickers Warwick (ASR)	RAF Davidstow Moor
304 Dywizjon Bombowy (Polish Air Forces)	Vickers Wellington	RAF Chivenor
No. 311 (Czechoslovak) Squadron RAF	Consolidated Liberator	RAF Predannack
No. 404 (Buffalo) Squadron RCAF	Bristol Beaufighter	RAF Davidstow Moor
No. 407 (Goose) Squadron RCAF	Vickers Wellington	RAF Chivenor
No. 461 Squadron RAAF	Short Sunderland	RAF Pembroke Dock
No. 502 (Ulster) Squadron RAF	Handley Page Halifax	RAF St David's
No. 517 Squadron RAF	Handley Page Halifax (Met)	RAF Brawdy
No. 524 Squadron RAF	Vickers Wellington	RAF Davidstow Moor
No. 547 Squadron RAF	Consolidated Liberator	RAF St Eval
No. 612 (County of Aberdeen) Squadron RAF	Vickers Wellington	RAF Chivenor
No. 10 Squadron RAAF	Short Sunderland	RAF Mount Batten
No. 816 Squadron FAA	Fairey Swordfish	RAF Perranporth
No. 838 Squadron FAA	Fairey Swordfish	RAF Harrowbeer
No. 849 Squadron FAA	Grumman Avenger	RAF Perranporth
No. 850 Squadron FAA	Grumman Avenger	RAF Perranporth
US Navy Patrol Bomber Squadron VPB-103	PB4Y-1 Privateer	RAF Dunkeswell
US Navy Patrol Bomber Squadron VPB-105	PB4Y-1 Privateer	RAF Dunkeswell
US Navy Patrol Bomber Squadron VPB-110	PB4Y-1 Privateer	RAF Dunkeswell
US Navy Patrol Bomber Squadron VPB-114	PB4Y-1 Privateer	RAF Dunkeswell

No. 106 Group RAF, under command of Air Commodore J.N. Boothman, CB, DFC, AFC

Squadron	Type of aircraft	Station
No. 540 Squadron RAF	de Havilland Mosquito	RAF Benson
No. 541 Squadron RAF	Supermarine Spitfire	RAF Benson (Det. at RAF St Eval)
No. 542 Squadron RAF	Supermarine Spitfire	RAF Benson
No. 544 Squadron RAF	de Havilland Mosquito	RAF Benson

No. 247 Group RAF, under command of Air Vice Marshal G R Bromet KBE, CB, DSO, DL

Squadron	Type of aircraft	Station
No. 220 Squadron RAF	Boeing B-17 Flying Fortress	RAF Lagens, Azores
No. 269 Squadron RAF	Lockheed Hudson/Supermarine Walrus/Supermarine Spitfire	RAF Lagens, Azores

AHQ Gibraltar, under command of Air Vice Marshal W. Elliott, CB, CBE, DFC

Squadron	Type of aircraft	Station
No. 202 Squadron RAF	Consolidated Catalina	RAF Gibraltar (New Camp)
No. 520 Squadron RAF	Handley Page Halifax/Gloster Gladiator (Met)	RAF Gibraltar (North Front)

AHQ Iceland, under command of Air Commodore C.G. Wigglesworth, AFC

Squadron	Type of Aircraft	Station
No. 162 Squadron RCAF	Consolidated Canso	Skerja Fjord, Reykjavík
No. 1407 (Meteorological) Flight RAF	Lockheed Hudson	RAF Reykjavik
