= No. 16 Group RAF =

Former Royal Air Force operations group

No. 16 (Reconnaissance) Group RAF ~~No. 16 (Training) Group~~ ~~No. 16 Group~~
- Royal Air Force Ensign
- Active: 1 April 1918 – 7 February 1920; 1 December 1936 – 8 March 1946
- Country: United Kingdom
- Branch: Royal Air Force
- Type: Royal Air Force group
- Role: Training (1918–1920); Reconnaissance (1936–1946)
- Part of: No. 4 Area (1 Apr 1918 – 7 May 1918); North-Eastern Area (8 May 1918 – 17 Oct 1919); Northern Area (18 Oct 1919 – 7 Feb 1920); RAF Coastal Command (1 Dec 1936 – 8 Mar 1946)
- Motto: We seek to strike
- Engagements: Second World War

Commanders
- Notable commanders: Air Chief Marshal Hugh Caswall Tremenheere Dowding, 1st Baron Dowding GCB, GCVO, CMG

No. 16 Group RAF (16 Gp) was a group of the Royal Air Force. It existed over two periods in two different roles. No. 16 Group was initially a training group, from 1918 to 1920, that had been transferred from the Royal Flying Corps. It reformed as a reconnaissance group under RAF Coastal Command, in 1936.

== History ==
=== First World War ===
With the creation of the Royal Air Force as a new service, No. 16 Group was established at Fossgate in York on 1 April 1918. This was done by re-designating the Royal Flying Corps's Northern Training Brigade as No. 16 Group. The training role was continued.

RAF Detling was assigned to the group upon the station's opening in 1939.

=== Interwar period ===
On 1 December 1936 the group reformed at Wykeham Hall, Lee-on-the-Solent as No 16 (Reconnaissance) Group RAF, in RAF Coastal Command. It was tasked with maritime reconnaissance and anti-submarine warfare in the South East area of the English Channel and the North Sea. The group comprised Royal Air Force squadrons, with attached Naval Air Squadrons from the Royal Navy's Fleet Air Arm, operating under Royal Air Force control.

On 1 December 1937, it moved to RAF Lee-on-Solent, then to relocated to Chatham on 27 September 1938. On 8 October it returned to Lee-on-Solent, but one month later transferred to Black Lion Field, Gillingham, Kent on 8 November 1938. An Area Combined HQ was formed operating throughout the Second World War.

=== Second World War ===
==== Early war ====
By November 1939, acting Air Vice-Marshal Reginald Marix CB, DSO was Air Officer Commanding, No. 16 Group RAF. The group controlled six units across three RAF stations. RAF Thorney Island, situated in West Sussex, England, was home to No. 48 Squadron, that operated with Avro Anson I, which is a British twin-engine, multi-role aircraft. At this time RAF Coastal Command were using the Avro Anson in a general reconnaissance and bomber role. Also stationed at Thorney Island and using Avro Anson, was No. 1 Coast Artillery Co-operation Unit RAF or (No. 1 CACU). No. 22 Squadron was also based there, and was equipped with Vickers Vildebeest, a large biplane Torpedo Bomber / Army Co-operation aircraft and was re-equipping at the time with Bristol Beaufort, a British twin-engined torpedo bomber. No. 1 Coast Artillery Co-operation Unit also had a detachment of Avro Anson, based at RAF Detling, located in Kent, England, and another No. 16 Group unit, No. 500 Squadron was also based there, the squadron was also equipped with Avro Anson. RAF Bircham Newton, located in Norfolk, England, was home to two No. 16 Group squadrons. No. 42 Squadron which was equipped with Vickers Vildebeest and No. 206 Squadron, another squadron using Avro Anson I.

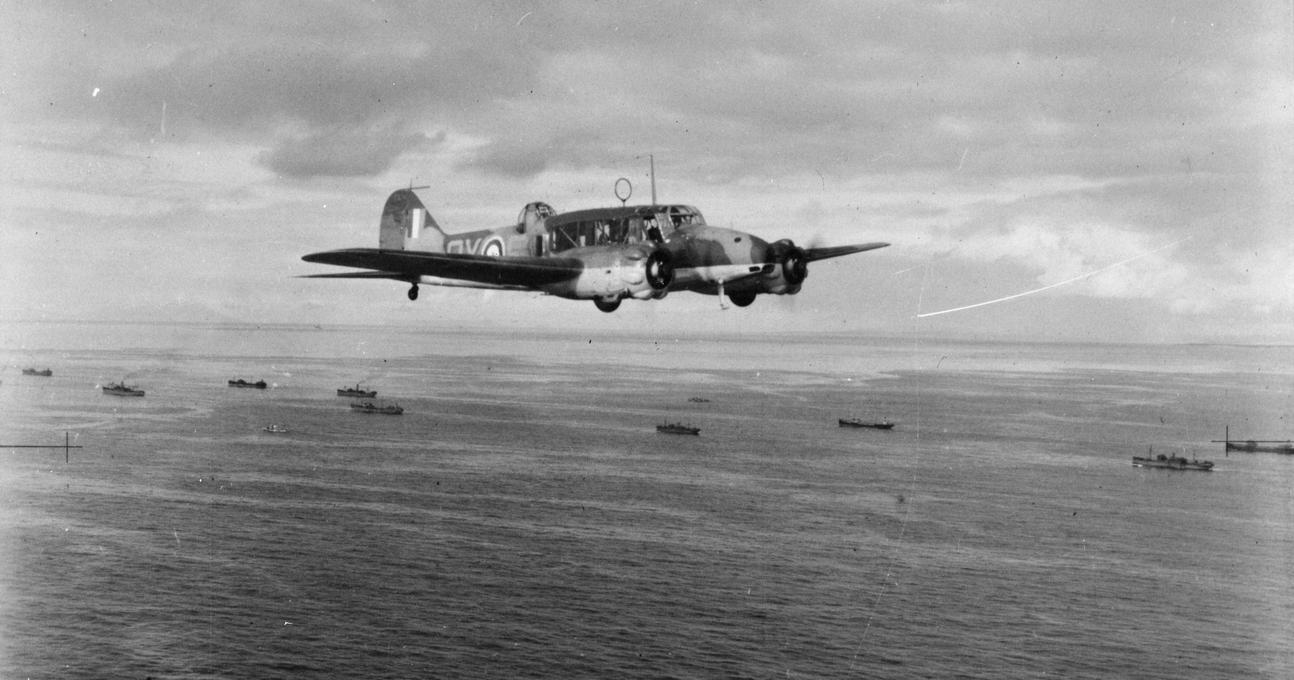
An East Coast convoy, 1940, with an Anson aircraft of Coastal Command in the foreground

In January 1940, Air Vice-Marshall John Tyssen CB, MC, was appointed Air Officer Commanding (AOC), No. 16 Group RAF. The size of the group, by units controlled, increased from the beginning of the Second World War and by May 1941 it consisted six flying squadrons and two other flying units, across six RAF stations. RAF Bircham Newton was home to four of those units. No. 206 Squadron, which by this time had converted from Avro Anson to Lockheed Hudson, an American light bomber and coastal reconnaissance aircraft. No. 235 Squadron, equipped with Bristol Blenheim, light bomber aircraft. No. 1403 (Meteorological) Flight RAF, and a flight from No. 500 Squadron, which was based at RAF Detling with Avro Anson and Bristol Blenhiem. The group also controlled two more Bristol Blenheim squadrons with No. 59 Squadron based at RAF Thorney Island and No. 86 Squadron based at RAF Wattisham, situated in Suffolk. No. 16 Group Communications Flight, which used various aircraft, was stationed at Rochester, in Kent, and the group controlled one Bristol Beaufort unit, with No. 22 Squadron at RAF North Coates, in Lincolnshire.

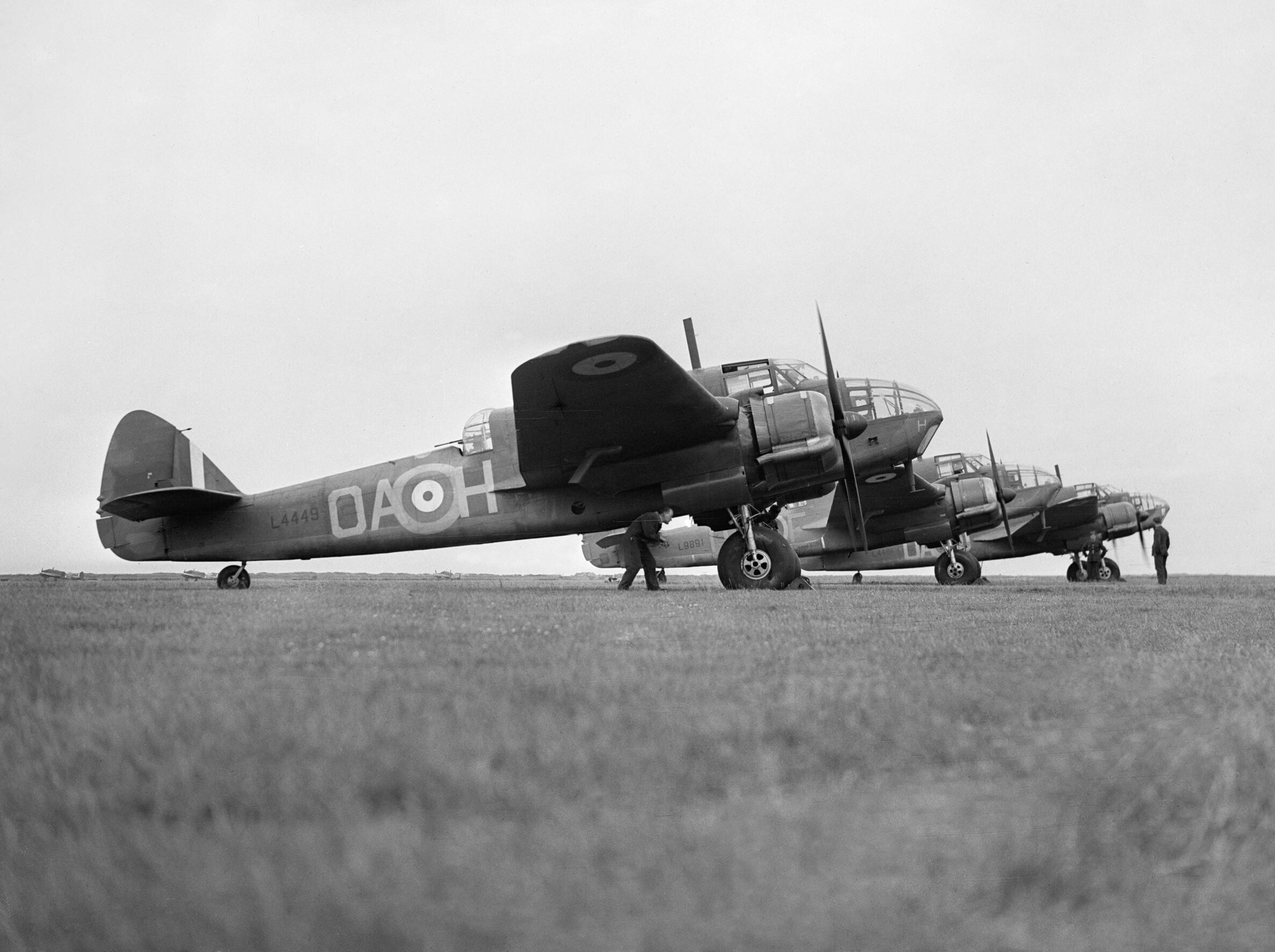
Bristol Beaufort Mk Is of No. 22 Squadron RAF at North Coates in Lincolnshire, 19 July 1940. Beaufort Mark Is, L4449 'OA-H', L9891 'OA-F' and L4461 'OA-J', of No. 22 Squadron RAF, lined up at North Coates, Lincolnshire

By April 1942 the Group Communications Flight had relocated to RAF Detling and Air Vice-Marshall John Tyssen had been replaced as AOC No. 16 Group by Air Commodore Ivor Thomas Lloyd. No. 1 Photographic Reconnaissance Unit was under the control of the group, based at RAF Benson in Oxfordshire, and was equipped with a variety of aircraft modified for the photographic reconnaissance role, including Supermarine Spitfire, Bristol Blenheim, Lockheed Hudson and de Havilland Mosquito. RAF Bircham Newton still had four 16 Group controlled units there. No. 500 Squadron had moved from RAF Detling and operated Lockheed Hudson alongside Nos 279 and 407 Squadrons, with No. 1401 (Meteorological) Flight RAF also there. There were two other Lockheed Hudson equipped squadrons, Nos 53 and 59 Squadrons at RAF North Coates. No. 280 Squadron at RAF Detling and was equipped with Avro Anson I and was based alongside No 1 Coast Artillery Co-operation Flight RAF RAF Wattisham was home to No. 236 Squadron equipped with Bristol Beaufighter IC and three units were based at RAF Thorney Island, Nos 415 and 489 Squadrons, both equipped with Handley Page Hampden and No. 2 Armament Practice Camp RAF, which had formed at RAF Thorney Island in November 1941 by redesignating No. 16 Group Armament Practice Camp RAF, equipped with Westland Lysander III, an army co-operation and liaison aircraft, and Miles Martinet I, a target tug aircraft.

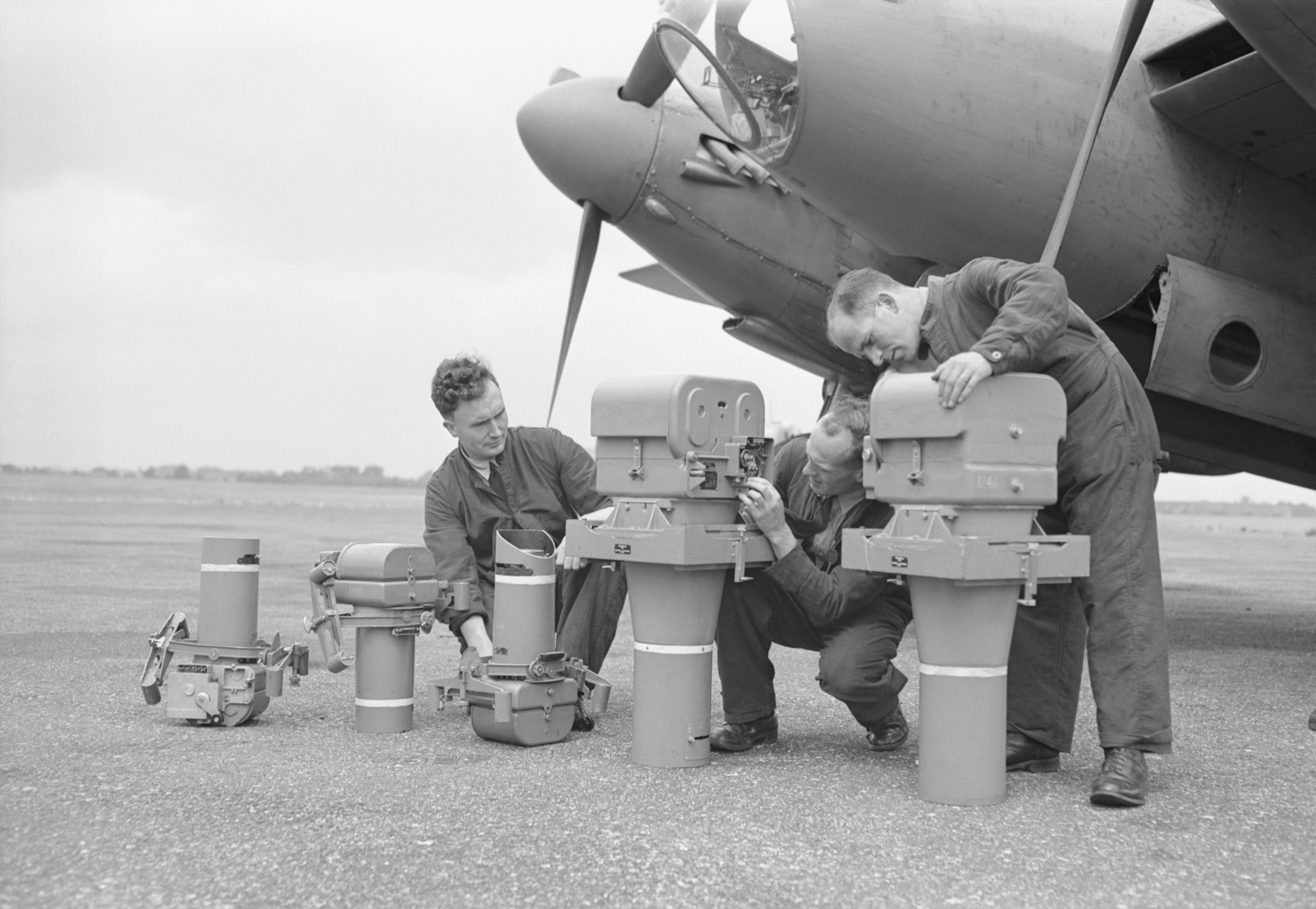
Instrument workers line up aerial cameras at Benson, Oxfordshire, before installing them in a De Havilland Mosquito PR Mark IX: (left to right) two Type F.24 (14-inch lens) vertical cameras, one F.24 (14-inch lens) oblique camera, two Type F.52 (36-inch lens) 'split pair' vertical cameras

==== Mid and later war ====
A view of No. 16 Group in April 1943 looked somewhat different to one twelve months prior, although the Group Communications Flight had remained at RAF Detling. No. 1 Photographic Reconnaissance Unit had disbanded at RAF Benson during October 1942, with its individual Flights forming five separate reconnaissance squadrons on the same day. By April 1943, these five squadrons were based at RAF Benson, with No. 540 Squadron equipped with de Havilland Mosquito, Nos 541, 542 and 543 Squadrons operating with Supermarine Spitfire, and No. 544 Squadron using both Supermarine Spitfire and Avro Anson. The Torpedo Development Unit RAF had moved under No. 16 Group and was based at RAF Gosport. The group controlled three Bristol Beaufighter units at RAF North Coates, Nos 143, 236 and 254 Squadrons.

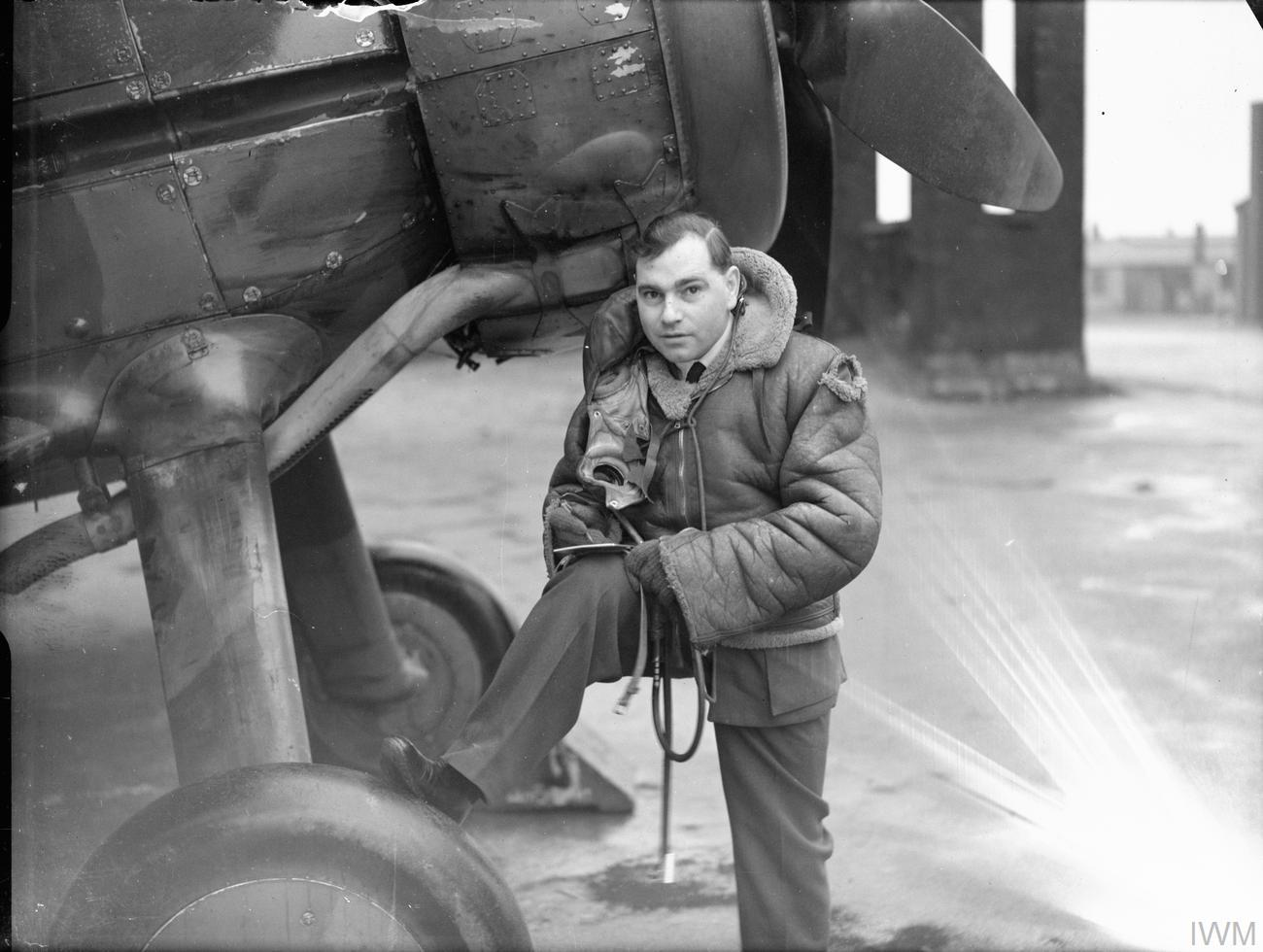
Flight-Lieutenant L S M Bailey preparing to write his report on his return from his 849th meteorological flight in a Gloster Gladiator Mark II of No 1401 (Meteorological) Flight, at Bircham Newton

RAF Bircham Newton was home to five No. 16 Group units and No. 521 Squadron, which was a meteorological observation unit, had split into Nos. 1401 and 1409 (Met) Flights and operated with Bristol Blenheim IV, Gloster Gladiator II, Supermarine Spitfire V, de Havilland Mosquito IV and Lockheed Hudson IIIA, with the latter Flight forming within No. 8 Group RAF Also at RAF Bircham Newton was No. 1525 (Beam Approach Training) Flight RAF (1525 BATF), which was equipped with Airspeed Oxford, a twin-engined trainer aircraft, and three flying squadrons, Nos 53, 279 and 280 Squadrons, the two former operating Lockheed Hudson and the latter using Avro Anson. Three units were based at RAF Thorney Island, No. 415 Squadron with Handley Page Hampden and No. 86 Squadron, (although preparing to move to RAF Aldergrove), which now used Consolidated Liberator. No. 2 Armament Practice Camp RAF, remained at RAF Thorney Island, equipped with Westland Lysander.

By July 1944 Acting Air Vice-Marshal Frank Hopps was AOC No. 16 Group, having been appointed twelve months earlier. The Group controlled three wings, nine flying squadrons, five other flying units across nine RAF Stations. No. 6 Flying Boat Servicing Unit RAF had formed at RAF Calshot, located at Southampton, in Hampshire, during September 1943 within No. 16 Group. No. 1525 (Beam Approach Training) Flight, with Airspeed Oxford, was still based at RAF Bircham Newton. As was the meteorological observation unit, No. 521 Squadron, equipped with Lockheed Hudson and Gloster Gladiator. No. 415 Squadron with Vickers Wellington VIII and Fairey Albacore, and No. 279 Squadron with Lockheed Hudson III, V & VI variants, were also based there. The Group Communications Flight had remained at RAF Detling. The Torpedo Development Unit had disbanded in September 1943, merging with the Torpedo Experimental Establishment, to form the Aircraft Torpedo Development Unit and was based at RAF Gosport.

RAF Langham was home to a detachment of No. 2 Armament Practice Camp, and also based here was No. 455 Squadron RAAF, a Royal Australian Air Force (RAAF) torpedo bomber squadron equipped with Bristol Beaufighter, and No. 489 Squadron RNZAF, Royal New Zealand Air Force torpedo bomber squadron, also equipped with Bristol Beaufighter. Two other Bristol Beaufighter equipped squadrons were based at RAF North Coates, Nos 236 and 254 Squadrons. No. 154 Wing RAF had formed in April 1944, designated as No. 154 (General Reconnaissance) Wing, at RAF Strubby within No. 16 Group . It was tasked with operational control of North Sea local areas during the Allied invasion of German-occupied Western Europe. During July 1944, No. 280 Squadron was part of the wing, and was equipped with Vickers Warwick I. No. 155 (General Reconnaissance) Wing was formed at RAF Manston to oversee operations in the Strait of Dover during the Allied invasion of occupied France and around July 1944 included No. 143 Squadron and 819 Naval Air Squadron, the former equipped with Bristol Beaufighter X, and the latter with Fairey Swordfish, a biplane torpedo bomber. At RAF Hawkinge No. 157 (General Reconnaissance) Wing RAF formed in May 1944 for operational control of local parts of the North Sea and English Channel during the Allied invasion, within No. 16 Group.

No. 16 Group disbanded by being reduced to HQ (Unit) No. 16 Wing RAF on 8 March 1946.

=== 16 Group Communications Flight ===
No. 16 Group Communications Flight RAF (16 GCF) formed at Rochester located in Kent, on 3 September 1939. It operated various types and marks of aircraft: It moved to RAF Detling during June 1941, returning to Rochester on 8 January 1945

- Miles Mentor, training and communications aircraft
- Airspeed Envoy 3, light transport aircraft
- Percival Proctor I, III, trainer and communications aircraft
- Airspeed Oxford I, trainer aircraft
- General Aircraft Monospar ST-25, utility aircraft
- de Havilland Hornet Moth, single-engined cabin biplane
- de Havilland Tiger Moth I, biplane trainer aircraft
- Avro Anson I, multi-role aircraft
- de Havilland Dominie, Communications and transport aircraft

No. 16 Group Communications Flight disbanded on 8 March 1946, at Rochester.

== Squadrons ==
The following squadrons served as part of No. 16 Group for some time during the Second World War.

Royal Air Force

Listed as Order of Battle on specific dates during the Second World War:

No 16 Group

- 3 September 1939
  - No. 22 Squadron – Vickers Vildebeest
  - No. 42 Squadron - Vickers Vildebeest
  - No. 48 Squadron - Avro Anson
  - No. 206 Squadron - Avro Anson
  - No. 500 Squadron - Avro Anson
- 1 November 1940
  - No. 22 Squadron - Bristol Beaufort
  - No. 53 Squadron - Bristol Blenheim
  - No. 59 Squadron - Bristol Blenheim
  - No. 206 Squadron - Lockheed Hudson
  - No. 220 Squadron - Lockheed Hudson
  - No. 235 Squadron - Bristol Blenheim
  - No. 500 Squadron - Avro Anson
  - No. 608 Squadron - Avro Anson/Blackburn Botha

- 12 February 1942
  - No. 22 Squadron - Bristol Beaufort
  - No. 59 Squadron - Lockheed Hudson
  - No. 217 Squadron - Bristol Beaufort
  - No. 233 Squadron - Lockheed Hudson
  - No. 248 Squadron - Bristol Beaufighter
  - No. 279 Squadron - Lockheed Hudson (ASR)
  - No. 280 Squadron - Avro Anson (ASR)
  - No. 407 Squadron - Lockheed Hudson
  - No. 415 Squadron - Handley Page Hampden/Bristol Beaufort
  - No. 500 Squadron - Lockheed Hudson
  - No. 502 Squadron - Armstrong Whitworth Whitley
  - Meteorological Flight
    - No. 1401 (Meteorological) Flight RAF - Bristol Blenheim
  - Reconnaissance
    - Photographic Reconnaissance Unit - Supermarine Spitfire
- 15 February 1943
  - No. 53 Squadron - Lockheed Hudson
  - No. 86 Squadron - Consolidated Liberator
  - No. 143 Squadron - Bristol Beaufighter
  - No. 236 Squadron - Bristol Beaufighter
  - No. 254 Squadron - Bristol Beaufighter
  - No. 320 Squadron - Lockheed Hudson
  - No. 407 Squadron - Lockheed Hudson
  - Meteorological Flights
    - No. 521 Squadron - Gloster Gladiator/Supermarine Spitfire/Lockheed Hudson/de Havilland Mosquito
  - Reconnaissance
    - No. 540 Squadron - de Havilland Mosquito
    - No. 541 Squadron - Supermarine Spitfire
    - No. 542 Squadron - Supermarine Spitfire
    - No. 543 Squadron - Supermarine Spitfire
    - No. 544 Squadron - Supermarine Spitfire/Vickers Wellington/Martin Maryland
  - Fleet Air Arm
    - 833 Naval Air Squadron - Fairey Swordfish
    - 836 Naval Air Squadron - Fairey Swordfish

- 6 June 1944
  - No. 143 Squadron - Bristol Beaufighter
  - No. 236 Squadron - Bristol Beaufighter
  - No. 254 Squadron - Bristol Beaufighter
  - No. 279 Squadron - Lockheed Hudson (ASR)
  - No. 280 Squadron - Vickers Warwick (ASR)
  - No. 415 Squadron - Vickers Wellington
  - No. 455 Squadron RAAF - Bristol Beaufighter
  - No. 489 Squadron RNZAF - Bristol Beaufighter
  - Meteorological Flights
    - No. 521 Squadron - Gloster Gladiator/Lockheed Ventura
    - No. 1401 (Meteorological) Flight RAF - Supermarine Spitfire
  - Fleet Air Arm
    - 819 Naval Air Squadron - Fairey Swordfish
    - 848 Naval Air Squadron - Grumman Avenger
    - 854 Naval Air Squadron - Grumman Avenger
    - 855 Naval Air Squadron - Grumman Avenger

== Air Officers Commanding ==
Date	Air Officer Commanding
1 April 1918 – 4 April 1918	
4 April 1918 – 11 March 1919	Brigadier-General John Becke
11 March 1919 – 18 October 1919	unknown
18 October 1919 – 7 February 1920	Group Captain H. C. T. Dowding
7 February 1920 – 1 December 1936	disbanded
1 December 1936 – 26 April 1937	unknown
27 April 1937	Air Commodore H. M. Cave-Browne-Cave
17 August 1938	Group Captain I. T. Lloyd (Temporary)
20 September 1938	Air Vice-Marshal Christopher L. Courtney
14 March 1939	Group Captain (later Air Commodore) R. L. G. Marix
xx January 1940	Air Vice-Marshal J. H. S. Tyssen
xx February 1942	Air Vice-Marshal I. T. Lloyd
1942 – 1943	Air Vice-Marshal B. E. Baker
28 July 1943 – 8 March 1946	Air Vice-Marshal F. L. Hopps

== See also ==
- List of Royal Air Force groups
- RAF Coastal Command
- RAF Coastal Command during World War II
- RAF Coastal Command order of battle during World War II
