= RAF Reykjavik =

Former Royal Air Force station in Iceland

RAF Reykjavik

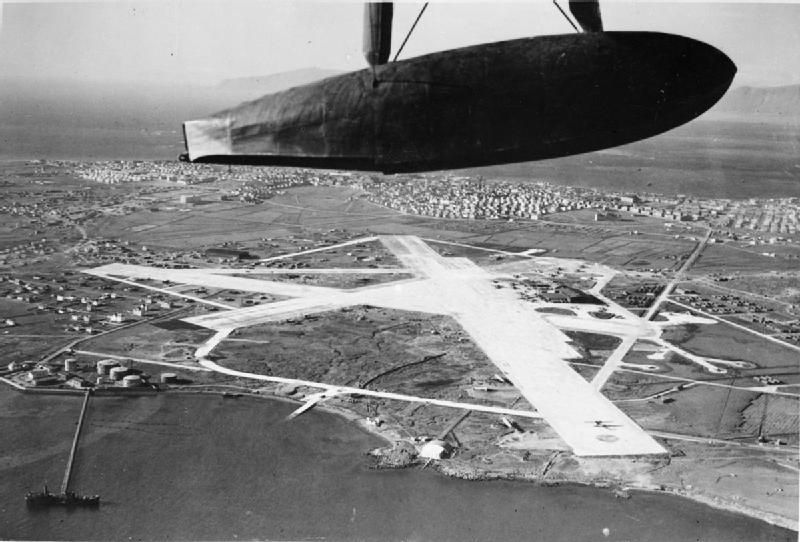
- IATA: RKV; ICAO: BIRK

Summary
- Airport type: Military
- Owner: Icelandic Government
- Operator: Royal Air Force
- Serves: Reykjavík, Iceland
- Location: Reykjavík, Iceland
- Built: 1940
- In use: 1941-1945
- Elevation AMSL: 45 ft / 13.7 m
- Coordinates: 64°07′48″N 021°56′26″W

Map
- Location in Iceland

Royal Air Force Reykjavik or more simply RAF Reykjavik is a former Royal Air Force station, at Reykjavík Airport, Iceland. It was constructed during the allied occupation of Iceland during the Second World War, by the British Armed Forces.

== History ==
After the invasion of Iceland, the construction of an airport was pertinent for military operations. The Vatnsmýri site was requisitioned and built up as an airport and base by the British Army.

Construction began in October 1940, initially operating with a grass surface. The Black Watch regiment along with a contingent of local Icelandic labourers built the first runway over sunken oil barrels. Part of the Skerjafjörður neighbourhood had to be demolished for the construction of the 13/31 runway.

The British Army and the Royal Air Force used the airport from March 1941 and throughout the remainder of the Second World War.

Multiple aircraft hangars and Nissen huts were constructed by the British Army, many of which continue to be used into the 21st century.

During the war, domestic and international civilian air traffic was very restricted. The airport was handed over to Icelandic authorities and became a civilian facility as Reykjavík Airport in 1946.

== Squadrons ==
Sqn	Aircraft	Joined	Departed	From → To	Notes
53	Consolidated Liberator VI & VIII	13 September 1944	1 June 1945	RAF St Eval → RAF St Davids	Squadron move and a detachment sent to RAF Ballykelly.
86	Consolidated Liberator IIIA & V	24 March 1944	1 July 1944	RAF Ballykelly → RAF Tain	Squadron moved with a detachment to RAF Tain.
120	Consolidated Liberator III & V	15 April 1943	24 March 1944	RAF Aldergrove → RAF Ballykelly	Originally detachments from RAF Ballykelly and then RAF Aldergrove before Squadron move and detachment to RAF Aldergrove.
190	Consolidated PBY Catalina IB	17 February 1943	October 1943	RAF Sullom Voe → DB	On detachment before the Squadron was disbanded and then reformed as No. 210 Sqn.
204	Short Sunderland I & II	5 April 1941	15 July 1941	RAF Sullom Voe → RAF Gibraltar	Squadron move and a detachment to RAF Pembroke Dock.
209	Consolidated PBY Catalina I	26 July 1941	10 October 1941	RAF Lough Erne → RAF Pembroke Dock	Squadron move.
210	Short Sunderland I	13 July 1940	28 February 1942	RAF Oban → RAF Sullom Voe	On detachment only.
220	Boeing Fortress II	July 1942	14 February 1943	RAF Ballykelly → RAF Aldergrove	On detachment only.
221	Vickers Wellington IC	2 May 1941	25 December 1941	RAF Limavady → RAF Docking	On detachment initially prior to Squadron move 29 September 1941 (with a detachment at RAF Limavady).
251	Lockheed Ventura I	1 August 1941	30 October 1945	Reformed → Disbanded	After the Ventura the squadron flew: Lockheed Hudson III, Avro Anson I, Boeing Fortress II and Vickers Warwick I.
269	Lockheed Hudson III	6 March 1943	8 January 1944	RAF Kaldadarnes → RAF Davidstow Moor	Squadron move.
279	Hawker Hurricane IIC	February 1945	3 September 1945	RAF Thornaby → RAF Beccles	On detachment only.
280	Vickers Warwick I	23 November 1945	21 June 1946	RAF Thornaby → DB	On detachment only prior to Squadron being disbanded.
330	Northrop N-3PB NOMAD; Catalina III	28 January 1943	12 July 1943	Formed → RAF Oban	This Squadron was formed at RAF Reykjavik on 25 April 1941 before being moved to RAF Oban leaving behind a detachment until their next move to RAF Sullom Voe. The squadron was disbanded 21 November 1945 and transferred to Norwegian control.
612	Armstrong Whitworth Whitley V & VII	1 April 1941	18 August 1942	RAF Wick → RAF Thorney Island	On detachment first then squadron move.

After the cessation of hostilities of the Second World War the British Government handed the airfield over to the Icelandic Civil Aviation Authority on 6 July 1946. It is now known as Reykjavik Airport.
