= RAF Sumburgh =

Former Royal Air Force base in Shetland, Scotland (1933–1946)

RAF Sumburgh
- Sumburgh, Shetland Islands in Scotland

Site information
- Type: Royal Air Force Satellite Station
- Code: UM
- Owner: Air Ministry
- Operator: Royal Air Force
- Controlled by: RAF Fighter Command; 1940-41; RAF Coastal Command; 1941-

Location
- Shown within Shetland RAF Sumburgh (the United Kingdom)
- Coordinates: 59°52′43″N 001°17′46″W

Site history
- Built: 1933
- In use: 1933 – 1946
- Battles/wars: European theatre of World War II

Airfield information
- Elevation: 1 metre (3 ft 3 in) AMSL
Runways
Direction	Length and surface
00/00	Tarmac
00/00	Tarmac
00/00	Tarmac

Royal Air Force Sumburgh or more simply RAF Sumburgh is a former Royal Air Force satellite station that was located on the southern tip of the mainland island of the Shetland Islands, and was home to half of No. 404 Squadron RCAF (Royal Canadian Air Force). At the outbreak of the Second World War the airstrip at the Sumburgh Links was taken over by the Air Ministry. By 1941 there were three operational runways at RAF Sumburgh from which a variety of RAF aircraft operated. Military use of the site ended in 1946 and it is now Sumburgh Airport.

== History ==
Sumburgh Links was surveyed and the grass strips laid out by Captain E. E. Fresson in 1936, and the airport was opened on 3 June of that year with the inaugural flight from Aberdeen (Kintore) by de Havilland Dragon Rapide G-ACPN piloted by Captain Fresson himself. It was also one of the first airfields to have RDF facilities, due to the frequency of low cloud and fog and the proximity of Sumburgh Head. The building of runways was at the instigation of Capt Fresson, who had proved to the Royal Navy at Hatston (Orkney) that it was essential to maintain all-round landing facilities over the winter months. This was taken up by the air force after the obvious success of the Hatston experiment.

The longest runway is 800 yards, and the shorter running a length of 600 yards from shoreline to shoreline. No. 404 Squadron operated Bristol Beaufighter Mark VI and X aircraft from this station on coastal raids against Axis shipping off the coast of Norway and in the North Sea.

No. 404 Squadron pioneered the use of unguided rocket projectiles against enemy merchant shipping sailing off the Norwegian coast by launching joint strike attacks with No. 144 Squadron (torpedo aircraft or 'Torbeaus') from RAF Sumburgh and RAF Wick in 1943 and early 1944.

The following units were posted to the airfield at some point:

- No. 3 Squadron RAF
- No. 17 Squadron RAF
- No. 42 Squadron RAF
- No. 48 Squadron RAF
- No. 66 Squadron RAF
- No. 86 Squadron RAF
- No. 118 Squadron RAF
- No. 125 (Newfoundland) Squadron RAF
- No. 129 (Mysore) Squadron RAF
- No. 132 (City of Bombay) Squadron RAF
- No. 143 Squadron RAF
- No. 144 Squadron RAF
- No. 152 (Hyderabad) Squadron RAF
- No. 162 Squadron RAF
- No. 164 (Argentine–British) Squadron RAF
- No. 217 Squadron RAF
- No. 232 Squadron RAF (1940)
- No. 234 (Madras Presidency) Squadron RAF
- No. 235 Squadron RAF
- No. 236 Squadron RAF
- No. 248 Squadron RAF
- No. 254 Squadron RAF (1940 & 1941)
- No. 272 Squadron RAF
- No. 278 Squadron RAF
- No. 307 Squadron RAF
- No. 310 (Czechoslovak) Squadron RAF
- No. 313 (Czechoslovak) Squadron RAF
- No. 331 (Norwegian) Squadron RAF
- No. 333 (Norwegian) Squadron RAF
- No. 404 Squadron RCAF
- No. 453 Squadron RAAF
- No. 455 Squadron RAAF
- No. 504 (County of Nottingham) Squadron AAF
- No. 598 Squadron RAF
- No. 602 (City of Glasgow) Squadron AAF
- No. 608 (North Riding) Squadron AAF
- No. 611 (West Lancashire) Squadron AAF
- 700 Naval Air Squadron
- 701 Naval Air Squadron
- 721 Naval Air Squadron
- 819 Naval Air Squadron
- 821 Naval Air Squadron
- 828 Naval Air Squadron
- 880 Naval Air Squadron
- No. 1 Air/Sea Rescue Marine Craft Unit
- No. 17 Air/Sea Rescue Marine Craft Unit
- No. 1693 (General Reconnaissance) Flight (June 1944 – May 1945)

=== Post war ===
Scheduled services continued during the war and, in 1946, British European Airways started a scheduled service with Junkers Ju 52s and then Douglas DC-3s. The main runway was lengthened in the mid-1960s.

== Current use ==
The airfield, now called Sumburgh Airport, is owned by the Highlands and Islands Airports Limited, and commercial flights are provided by Loganair and Highland Airways.
