= Tain Air Weapons Range =

Military range in Highlands, Scotland

- Near Tain, Highlands in Scotland
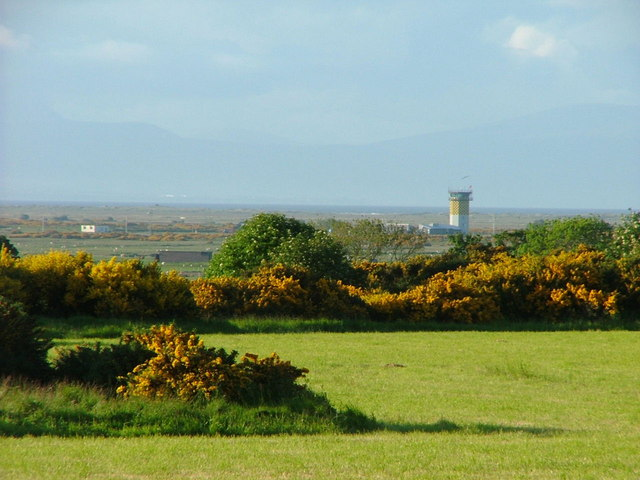
- Tain Air Weapons Range including the range control tower

Site information
- Type: Air weapons range
- Owner: Ministry of Defence
- Operator: Defence Infrastructure Organisation
- Open to the public: Yes (unless red flags flying)
- Condition: Operational

Location
- Location in the Highlands Tain AWR (the United Kingdom)
- Coordinates: 57°48′40″N 003°58′24″W
- Area: 1,196 hectares (2,960 acres)

Site history
- Built: 1930
- In use: 1930 – present

Garrison information
- Designations: National Scenic Are; Ramsar Site; Site of Special Scientific Interest; Special Area of Conservation; Special Protection Area

Tain Air Weapons Range (TAWR) is a Ministry of Defence air weapons range on the Dornoch Firth near Tain in Scotland. Royal Air Force aircrews from RAF Lossiemouth are trained in air weaponry on the range, along with NATO aircrew.

It was previously known as Royal Air Force Tain and Royal Naval Air Station Tain.

== History ==
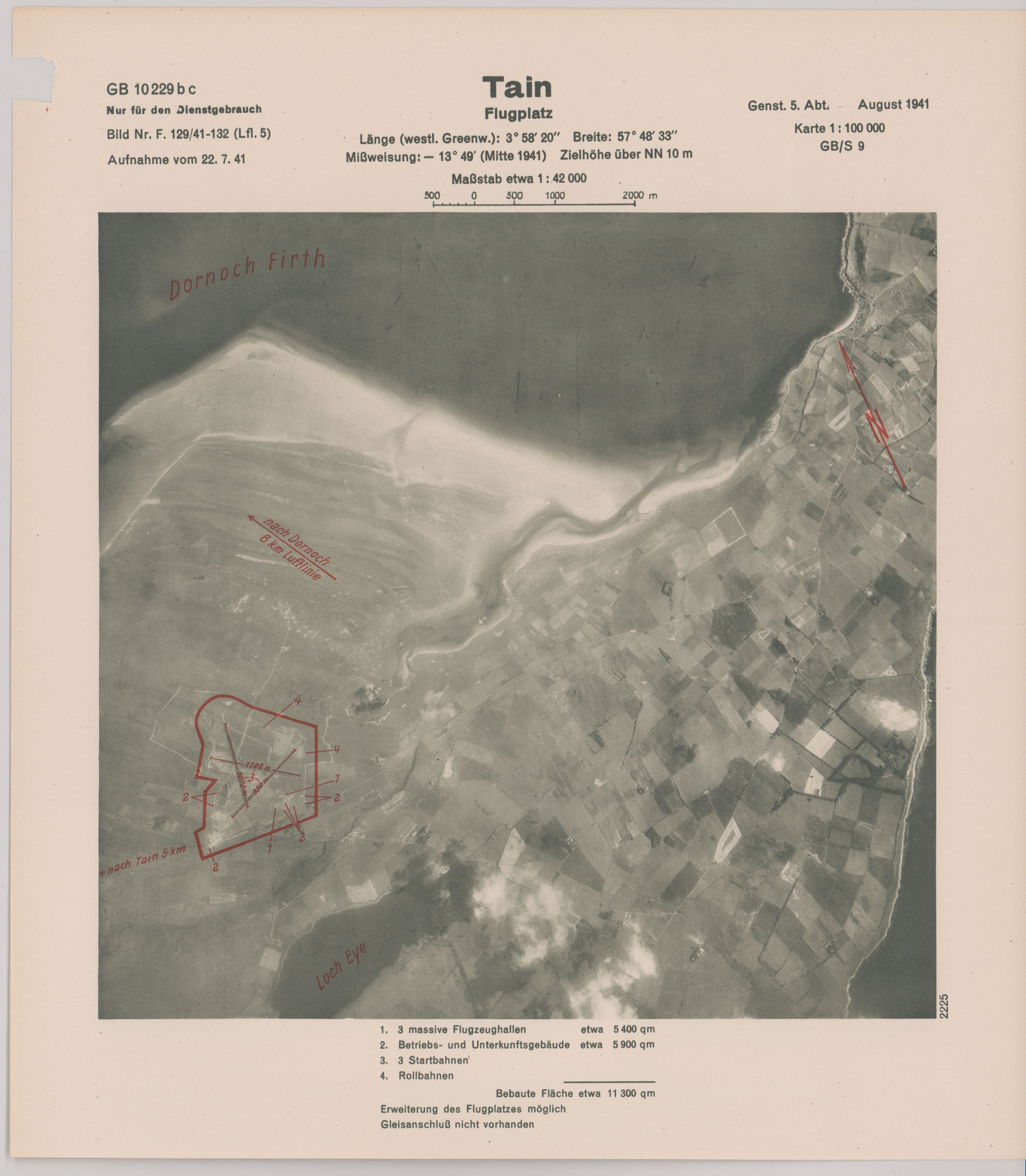
RAF Tain on a target dossier of the German Luftwaffe, 1941

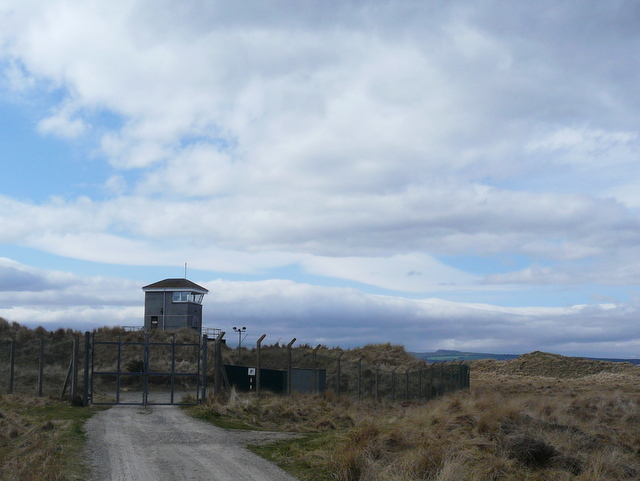
Observation tower at RAF Tain

The airfield opened in September 1941 under the command of RAF Fighter Command during the Second World War. It was particularly active in summer 1944 during anti-u-boat operations. It closed in spring 1946. The original airfield is no longer in operation, but still exists within the boundaries of the range. It became a weapons range in 1954 and is now the largest live weapons range in the Defence Training Estates.

On 1 April 2006, as part of a rationalisation of military training facilities in the UK, control of RAF Tain transferred from the RAF to Defence Training Estates and the range became known as Tain Air Weapons Range.

== Aircraft incidents ==
=== 1979 mid-air collision ===
On Friday 20 April 1979 at 10.40am, General Dynamics F-111 Aardvark '73-0714' had a mid-air collision, and both ejected. The aircraft was from the 492nd Tactical Fighter Squadron at RAF Lakenheath, all were aged 28. All landed in the Dornoch Firth, and a RAF Nimrod watched the scene.

- Capt Joe Peluso, pilot
- Capt Timothy Schlitt, WSO, from Affton, Missouri

F-111 '70-2367' had flown into the other F-111

- Capt Stephen Ruttman, pilot, from Oklahoma
- Capt Roger Webb, WSO, from Staunton, Virginia

=== 1983 Jaguar crash ===
On Monday 7 March 1983, SEPECAT Jaguar 'XZ376' crashed, from 17 Sqn, at RAF Bruggen, although it had taken off from RAF Lossiemouth.

- Flt. Lt. B. R. Iddon, ejected at 325 ft

== Units stationed at RAF Tain during the Second World War ==
The following units were posted to the airfield at some point during the Second World War:

=== First-line squadrons ===
- No. 17 Squadron RAF with the Hawker Hurricane IIB between 17 September and 31 October 1941.
- A detachment of No. 76 Squadron RAF between 1941 and 1943 with the Handley Page Halifax I & II.
- No. 86 Squadron RAF initially as a detachment between 24 March 1944 and 1 July 1944 when the rest of the squadron joined until 9 August 1945 when the squadron moved to RAF Oakington. The squadron used Consolidated Liberator IIIa, V & VIII.
- A detachment of No. 123 (East India) Squadron RAF from 22 September 1941 and 11 April 1942 with the Supermarine Spitfire IIA & VB.
- A detachment of No. 132 (City of Bombay) Squadron RAF between September 1941 and February 1942 with the Spitfire I & IIB.
- No. 144 Squadron RAF initially between 8 April 1943 and 9 July 1943 with the Bristol Beaufighter VIC & X. The squadron returned on 5 August 1943 still with the Beaufighter X staying until 20 October 1943.
- No. 186 Squadron RAF between 7 January 1944 and 1 March 1944 with the Hurricane IV, Hawker Typhoon IB and the Spitfire VB.
- A detachment of No. 235 Squadron RAF between 21 January 1943 and 29 August 1943 with the Beaufighter VIC.
- A detachment of No. 279 Squadron RAF between 31 October 1944 and 3 September 1945 with Vickers Warwick I, Hurricane IIC and the Supermarine Sea Otter.
- A detachment of No. 280 Squadron RAF between 23 November 1945 and 21 June 1946 with the Warwick I.
- A detachment of No. 281 Squadron RAF between 13 August 1945 and 24 October 1945 with the Warwick I & VI, Sea Otter and Vickers Wellington XIII.
- No. 311 (Czechoslovak) Squadron RAF between 7 August 1944 and 6 August 1945 using the Liberator V & VI.
- No. 404 Squadron RCAF between 2 and 20 April 1943 with the Beaufighter XI.
- A detachment of No. 415 Squadron RCAF initially between 5 August 1942 and 1 September 1942 with the Handley Page Hampden before the squadron completely moved to Tain for five days.
- No. 417 Squadron RAF between 24 February and 13 April 1942 with the Spitfire VB.
- A detachment of No. 455 Squadron RAF between 28 April 1942 and 14 April 1944 with the Hampden and Beaufighter X.
- No. 547 Squadron RAF initially between 22 January and 2 April 1943 with the Wellington VIII. A detachment returned on 2 April 1943 with the Wellington XI until 31 May 1943.

=== Meteorological squadrons ===
- A detachment of No. 518 Squadron RAF between 25 September 1943 and 1 October 1946 with the Halifax V, III & VI, Hurricane IIC and Spitfire VII.
- No. 519 Squadron RAF between 17 August 1945 and 8 November 1945 with the Boeing Fortress I, Spitfire VII and Halifax III.

=== Naval air squadrons ===
- 801 Naval Air Squadron between 15 February and 29 April 1942 with Hawker Sea Hurricane Ib.
- 815 Naval Air Squadron between 7 December 1943 and 24 February 1944 with the Fairey Barracuda II.
- 817 Naval Air Squadron between 8 and 26 February 1944 with the Barracuda II.
- 822 Naval Air Squadron between 10 November 1943 and 16 January 1944 with the Barracuda II.
- 829 Naval Air Squadron between 25 November 1943 and 8 February 1944 with the Barracuda II.

=== Training and development units ===
- No. 1 Torpedo Training Unit RAF (November 1945 – December 1946)
- Target Towing and Support Aircraft of No. 4 (Coastal) Operational Training Unit RAF (December 1944 – August 1946)
- Relief Landing Ground for No. 8 Air Gunners School RAF (January - April 1944)
- Relief Landing Ground for No. 19 (Pilots) Advanced Flying Unit RAF (July 1943 - )
- No. 1491 (Target Towing) Flight RAF (December 1941 – May 1942) became No. 1491 (Fighter) Gunnery Flight RAF (May - November 1942)
- No. 2831 Squadron RAF Regiment.
- Coastal Command Development Unit RAF. An element of the CCDU was split to become No. 1 Torpedo Refresher School RAF, formed here on 3 February 1943. The School was disbanded on 28 January 1944.
- Coastal Command Flying Instructors School RAF became the Coastal Command Instructors School RAF and was disbanded here on 1 April 1946.

== See also ==
- Armed forces in Scotland
- Military history of Scotland
