= No. 519 Squadron RAF =

Defunct flying squadron of the Royal Air Force

- Active: 15 August 1943 – 31 May 1946
- Country: United Kingdom
- Branch: Royal Air Force
- Type: Inactive
- Role: Meteorological
- Part of: No. 18 Group RAF, Coastal Command
- Motto(s): Undaunted by Weather

Insignia
- Squadron Badge heraldry: A polar bear's gamb erased in bend holding a scroll of parchment in front of a flash of lightning
- Squadron codes: Z9 (August 1943 – May 1946)

No. 519 Squadron RAF was a meteorological squadron of the Royal Air Force during the Second World War.

== History ==
No. 519 Squadron was formed on 15 August 1943 at RAF Wick from 1406 Flight, equipped with Handley Page Hampdens and Supermarine Spitfires. Its purpose was collecting meteorological data from the northern waters of the North Sea all the way to Norway. It soon replaced the Hampdens with Lockheed Hudsons and Lockheed Venturas. The squadron base moved on a number of times along the east coast of Scotland but the squadron's role remained the same. In November 1944 the squadron started using the Boeing Fortress, which it operated to the end of the war. With the war over, the squadron standardised on the Halifax Mk.III, until it was disbanded at RAF Leuchars on 31 May 1946.

== Aircraft operated ==
Aircraft operated by No. 519 Squadron RAF
From	To	Aircraft
August 1943	October 1943	Handley Page Hampden Mk.I
August 1943	January 1945	Supermarine Spitfire Mk.VI
September 1943	October 1943	Lockheed Hudson Mks.III and IIIa
October 1943	October 1944	Lockheed Ventura Mk.V
July 1944	March 1945	Lockheed Hudson Mks.III and IIIa
November 1944	September 1945	Boeing Fortress Mk.II
October 1944	December 1945	Supermarine Spitfire Mk.VII
August 1945	May 1946	Handley Page Halifax Mks III and VI

== Squadron bases ==
RAF stations used by No. 519 Squadron RAF
From	To	Base
15 August 1943	11 December 1943	RAF Wick, Caithness, Scotland
11 December 1943	29 November 1944	RAF Skitten, Caithness, Scotland
29 November 1944	17 August 1945	RAF Wick, Caithness, Scotland
17 August 1945	8 November 1945	RAF Tain, Ross and Cromarty, Scotland
8 November 1945	31 May 1946	RAF Leuchars, Fife, Scotland

== See also ==
- North Atlantic weather war
- List of Royal Air Force aircraft squadrons
