= No. 1 Photographic Reconnaissance Unit RAF =

Former Royal Air Force photographic reconnaissance unit

- Active: 14 Nov 1940–18 Oct 1942; 1 Jun 1982–1 Jul 1992
- Country: United Kingdom
- Branch: Royal Air Force
- Role: aerial reconnaissance
- Part of: No. 16 Group RAF, Coastal Command (1940–1942); No. 1 Group RAF, Strike Command (1982–1992)

Insignia
- Squadron Codes: LY (Nov 1940–Oct 1942)

No. 1 Photographic Reconnaissance Unit (or 1 PRU) was a flying unit of the Royal Air Force, first formed in 1940.

== History ==
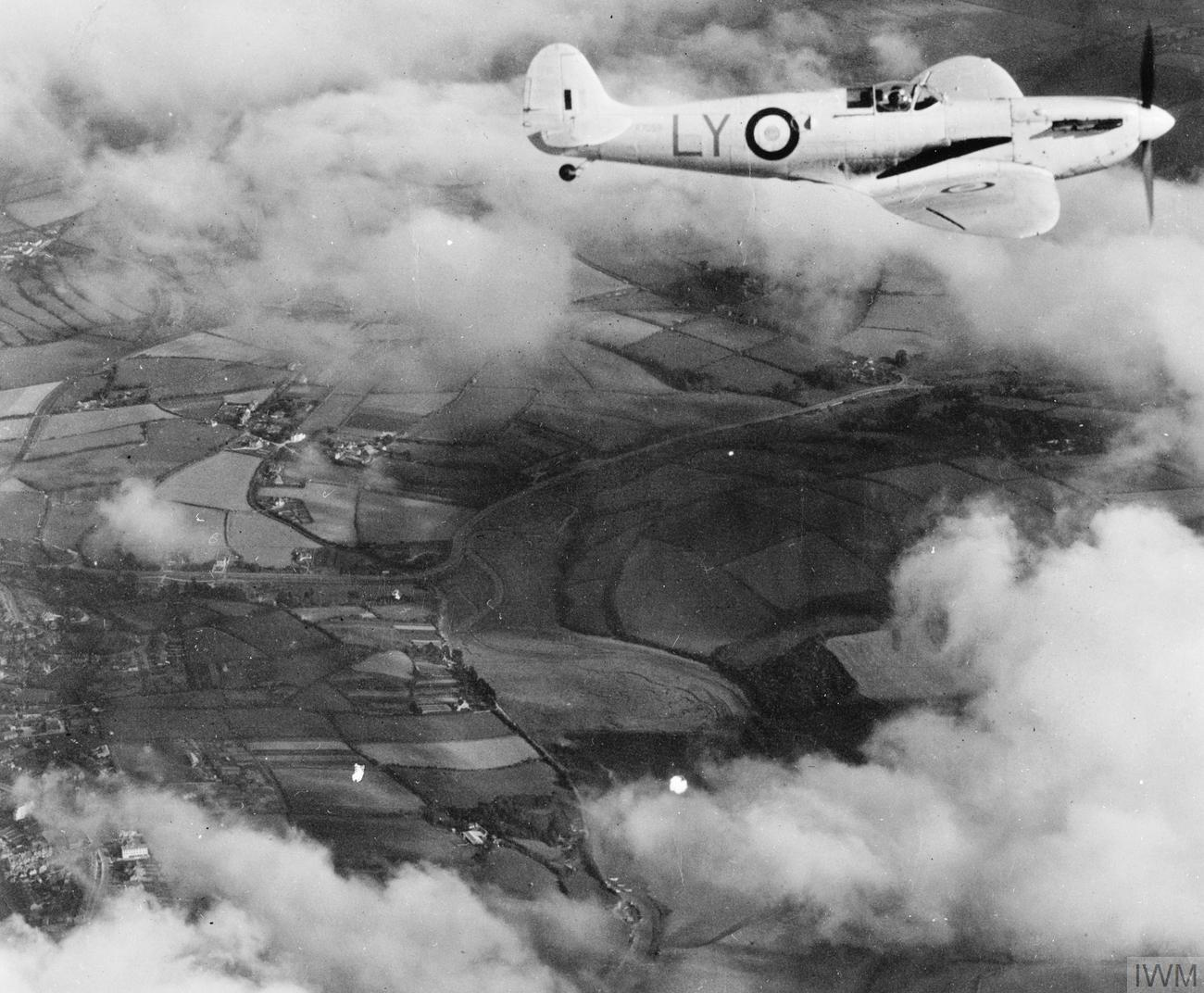
A 1 PRU Spitfire in flight.

On 24 September 1939, the Royal Air Force formally took over the "Heston Flight", a civilian photo reconnaissance unit headed by Sidney Cotton based at Heston Aerodrome. The unit had previously been contracted by MI6 to perform clandestine photographic reconnaissance over Europe, using civilian-registered Lockheed 12A aircraft. The Flight was redesignated several times, first on 1 November 1939 as No. 2 Camouflage Unit, then on 17 January 1940 as the Photographic Development Unit, then on 18 June 1940 the Photographic Reconnaissance Unit, and finally on 14 November 1940, No. 1 Photographic Reconnaissance Unit.

The unit was equipped with a variety of aircraft modified for the photographic reconnaissance role, including Supermarine Spitfires, Bristol Blenheims, Lockheed Hudsons and de Havilland Mosquitos.

On 18 October 1942, 1 PRU was disbanded and the individual Flights of the Unit were renamed 540 Squadron, 541 Squadron, 542 Squadron, 543 Squadron and 544 Squadron.

On 1 June 1982, the Unit was revived at RAF Wyton when No. 39 Squadron was disbanded and some of its English Electric Canberra PR.9 reconnaissance aircraft were transferred to a newly formed No. 1 Photographic Reconnaissance Unit. The Unit reverted to its previous identity on 1 July 1992, when it was renumbered No. 39 (1 PRU) Squadron.

The photographic archive of 1 PRU was incorporated into the Allied Central Interpretation Unit and held at the Print Library at RAF Medmenham before its move to Keele University. Since 2008 it has been part of the archive of the National Collection of Aerial Photography.

== See also ==
- MI4
