= No. 1406 Flight RAF =

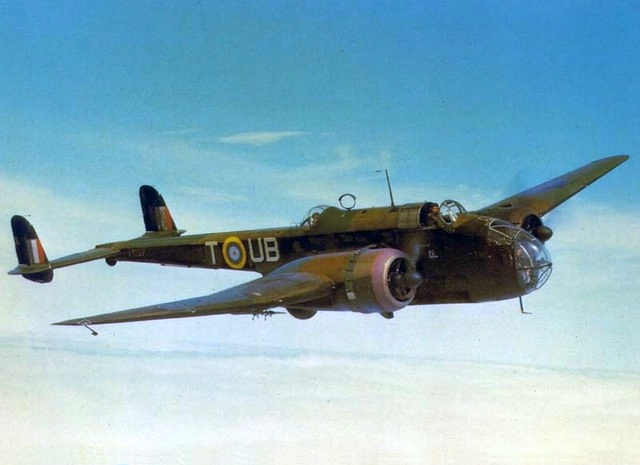
- A Handley Page Hampden similar to those used by 1406 flt.
- Active: 9 May 1941 – 7 August 1943
- Country: United Kingdom
- Branch: Royal Air Force
- Role: meteorological reconnaissance
- Garrison/HQ: RAF Wick
- Equipment: Handley Page Hampden; Consolidated B-24 Liberator; Supermarine Spitfire; Armstrong Whitworth Albemarle; Lockheed Hudson; Miles Master

No. 1406 (Meteorological) Flight RAF was formed at RAF Wick on 9 May 1941, equipped with a variety of aircraft, including Handley Page Hampdens and Supermarine Spitfires. 1406 Flight disbanded on 7 August 1943 forming the basis of 519 Squadron. The flight performed a range of meteorological reconnaissance duties over the North Sea.

== See also ==
- List of Royal Air Force aircraft squadrons
- List of RAF Regiment units
- List of Fleet Air Arm aircraft squadrons
- List of Army Air Corps aircraft units
- List of Royal Air Force aircraft independent flights
- List of RAF Squadron Codes
