= No. 547 Squadron RAF =

- Active: 22 October 1942 – 4 June 1945
- Country: United Kingdom
- Branch: Royal Air Force
- Motto(s): Latin: Celer ad caedendum (Swift to strike)

Insignia
- Squadron Badge: A diving kingfisher
- Squadron Code: 2V (August 1943 – June 1945)

No. 547 Squadron RAF was a Royal Air Force Squadron formed as an RAF Coastal Command anti-shipping and anti submarine squadron in World War II.

== History ==
=== Formation in World War II ===
The squadron formed at RAF Holmsley South on 21 October 1942 and was equipped with Wellingtons, it then operated Liberators and patrolled the Bay of Biscay. It later moved to RAF Leuchars, Scotland where it disbanded on 4 June 1945.

== Aircraft operated ==
Aircraft operated by no. 547 Squadron RAF
From	To	Aircraft	Variant
Oct 1942	May 1943	Vickers Wellington	VIII
May 1943	Nov 1943	Vickers Wellington	XI
Oct 1943	Nov 1943	Vickers Wellington	XIII
Nov 1943	Oct 1944	Consolidated B-24 Liberator	V
Aug 1944	May 1945	Consolidated B-24 Liberator	VI
Mar 1945	Jun 1945	Consolidated B-24 Liberator	VIII
