= Wick Airport =

Wick John O' Groats Airport Port-adhair Inbhir Ùige Taigh Iain Ghròt (Scottish Gaelic)

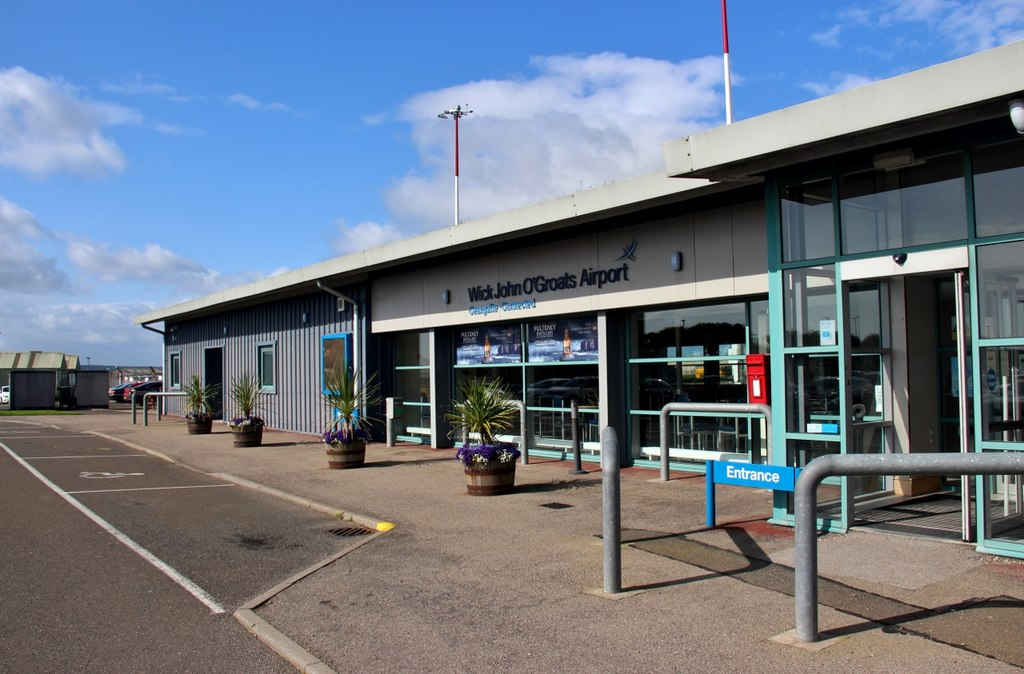
- IATA: WIC; ICAO: EGPC

Summary
- Airport type: Public
- Owner/Operator: HIAL
- Serves: Wick, Caithness
- Location: Wick, Scotland
- Elevation AMSL: 126 ft (38 m)
- Coordinates: 58°27′32″N 003°05′35″W
- Website: hial.co.uk

Map
- Location in Highland

Runways
Direction	Length		Surface
Direction	m	ft	Surface
13/31	1,831	6,007	Grooved Asphalt

Statistics (2025)
- Passengers: 6,688
- Passenger change 2024–25: ▼33%
- Air Transport movements: 643
- Movements change 2024–25: ▼39%
- Sources: UK AIP at NATS; Statistics: UK Civil Aviation Authority

Wick John O' Groats Airport (IATA: WIC, ICAO: EGPC) (Scottish Gaelic: Port-adhair Inbhir Ùige Taigh Iain Ghròt) is located 1 mile (2 km) north of the town of Wick, at the north-eastern extremity of the mainland of Scotland. It is owned and maintained by Highlands and Islands Airports Limited. The airport provides commercial air travel connections for Caithness, with scheduled services to Aberdeen Airport and, until early 2020, Edinburgh. It remains regularly used by helicopters servicing local offshore oil operations and the Beatrice Offshore Windfarm. Light aircraft also use the airport as a stop-over for ferry flights between Europe and North America via Iceland, and vice versa. The airport also operates an out of hours call-out service for air ambulances, coastguard and police flights. The airport has one usable runway. Two are disused.

== History ==
Wick was originally a grass airfield, used by Captain E. E. Fresson's Highland Airways Ltd. (later Scottish Airways Ltd.) from 1933 until 1939.

Requisitioned by the Air Ministry during the Second World War, the airfield was extended with hard runways, hangars, and other buildings. The airfield was administered by No. 18 Group, RAF Coastal Command and No. 13 Group, RAF Fighter Command and known as Royal Air Force Wick (RAF Wick). A satellite airfield existed at RAF Skitten.

On 21 May 1941, a photographic reconnaissance Supermarine Spitfire piloted by Flying Officer Michael F. Suckling took off from Wick, and flew to Norway, in search of the German battleship Bismarck. If Bismarck were to break out into the North Atlantic, she would present a significant risk to the ships supplying Britain. 320 miles to the east of Wick, F/O Suckling found and photographed her, hiding in Grimstadfjord. This information enabled the Royal Navy to order HMS Hood and other ships, as well as aircraft, to take positions intended to track Bismarck, and prevent her from entering the North Atlantic. In ensuing battles, Hood was sunk, and, later, Bismarck.

German battleships and battle cruisers never again entered the North Atlantic, partly because of continual reconnaissance flights by the RAF of German naval activity. Many of these flights originated at Wick. On 5 March 1942, RAF reconnaissance pilot Sandy Gunn (a native of Auchterarder, Perthshire), was shot down in his Spitfire on a flight from Wick over German naval installations in Norway. He survived and became a prisoner of war, but two years later he was executed after participating in the "Great Escape" from Stalag Luft III.

The following units were here at some point:

- No. 162 Squadron RCAF
- No. 3 Squadron RAF (1940)
- Detachment of No. 22 Squadron RAF (1940)
- No. 41 Squadron RAF (1939)
- No. 42 Squadron RAF (1940–41)
- No. 43 (China-British) Squadron RAF (1940)
- No. 48 Squadron RAF (1942)
- Detachment of No. 50 Squadron RAF (1938–40)
- Detachment of No. 58 Squadron RAF (1942)
- Detachment of No. 61 Squadron RAF (1939–41)
- Detachment of No. 86 Squadron RAF (1942)
- No. 111 Squadron RAF (1940)
- No. 122 (Bombay) Squadron RAF (1945–46)
- No. 144 Squadron RAF (1942 & 1943 & 1943–44)
- No. 220 Squadron RAF (1939–41)
- Detachment of No. 236 Squadron RAF (1942)
- Detachment of No. 248 Squadron RAF (1941)
- Detachment of No. 254 Squadron RAF (1942)
- No. 269 Squadron RAF (1939–41)
- Detachment of No. 279 Squadron RAF (1945)
- Detachment of No. 281 Squadron RAF (1944–45)
- No. 303 Squadron RAF (1946)
- No. 316 Polish Fighter Squadron (1945–46)
- No. 404 Squadron RCAF (1943–44)
- No. 407 Squadron RCAF (1944)
- No. 415 Squadron RCAF (1942)
- Detachment of No. 455 Squadron RAAF (1942–43)
- No. 489 Squadron RNZAF (1942–43)
- No. 504 (County of Nottingham) Squadron AAF (1940)
- Detachment of No. 518 Squadron RAF (1945)
- No. 519 Squadron RAF (1943 & 1944–45)
- No. 605 (County of Warwick) Squadron AAF (1940)
- No. 608 (North Riding) Squadron AAF (1942)
- No. 612 (County of Aberdeen) Squadron AAF (1941 & 1942–43)
- No. 618 Squadron RAF (1944)
- 801 Naval Air Squadron
- 803 Naval Air Squadron
- 804 Naval Air Squadron
- 808 Naval Air Squadron
- 887 Naval Air Squadron

Units

- 'B' Flight of No. 1 Photographic Reconnaissance Unit RAF (1 PRU) (January – April 1941)
- 'C' Flight of 1 PRU (November 1940 – January 1941)
- 'D' Flight of 1 PRU (April – July 1941)
- 'E' Flight of 1 PRU (July – October 1941)
- 'Mosquito' Flight of 1 PRU (May – December 1941)
- Calibration Flight of No. 1 Radio Maintenance Unit RAF (July – September 1940) became Calibration Flight of No. 1 Radio Servicing Section RAF (September 1940 – November 1940)
- No. 1406 (Meteorological) Flight RAF (May 1941 – August 1943)
- No. 1408 (Meteorological) Flight RAF (December 1941 – February 1942)
- No. 1693 (General Reconnaissance) Flight RAF (December 1943 – June 1944)
- No. 2709 Squadron RAF Regiment
- No. 2749 Squadron RAF Regiment
- No. 2887 Squadron RAF Regiment
- 'A' Flight of Photographic Reconnaissance Unit RAF (July – October 1940)
- 'C' Flight of Photographic Reconnaissance Unit RAF (October – November 1940)

== Airlines and destinations ==
Previously, Loganair operated regular flights from Wick between 1976 and 2020, with the final flight to Edinburgh Airport departing on 27 March 2020. The Scottish Government announced on 4 February 2021 that they would provide up to £4 million to the Highland Council in order to reintroduce flights to and from Wick Airport. Eastern Airways began operating the public service obligation flight to Aberdeen on 11 April 2022 but ended on 27 October 2025 after the airline ceased operations.

Airlines	Destinations
Air Charter Scotland	Aberdeen, Glasgow

== Statistics ==
Busiest routes to and from Wick Airport in 2025
Rank	Airport	Passengers handled	2024–25 change
1	Aberdeen Airport	4,942	▼50%
