= 855 Naval Air Squadron =

Inactive flying squadron of the Royal Navy's Fleet Air Arm

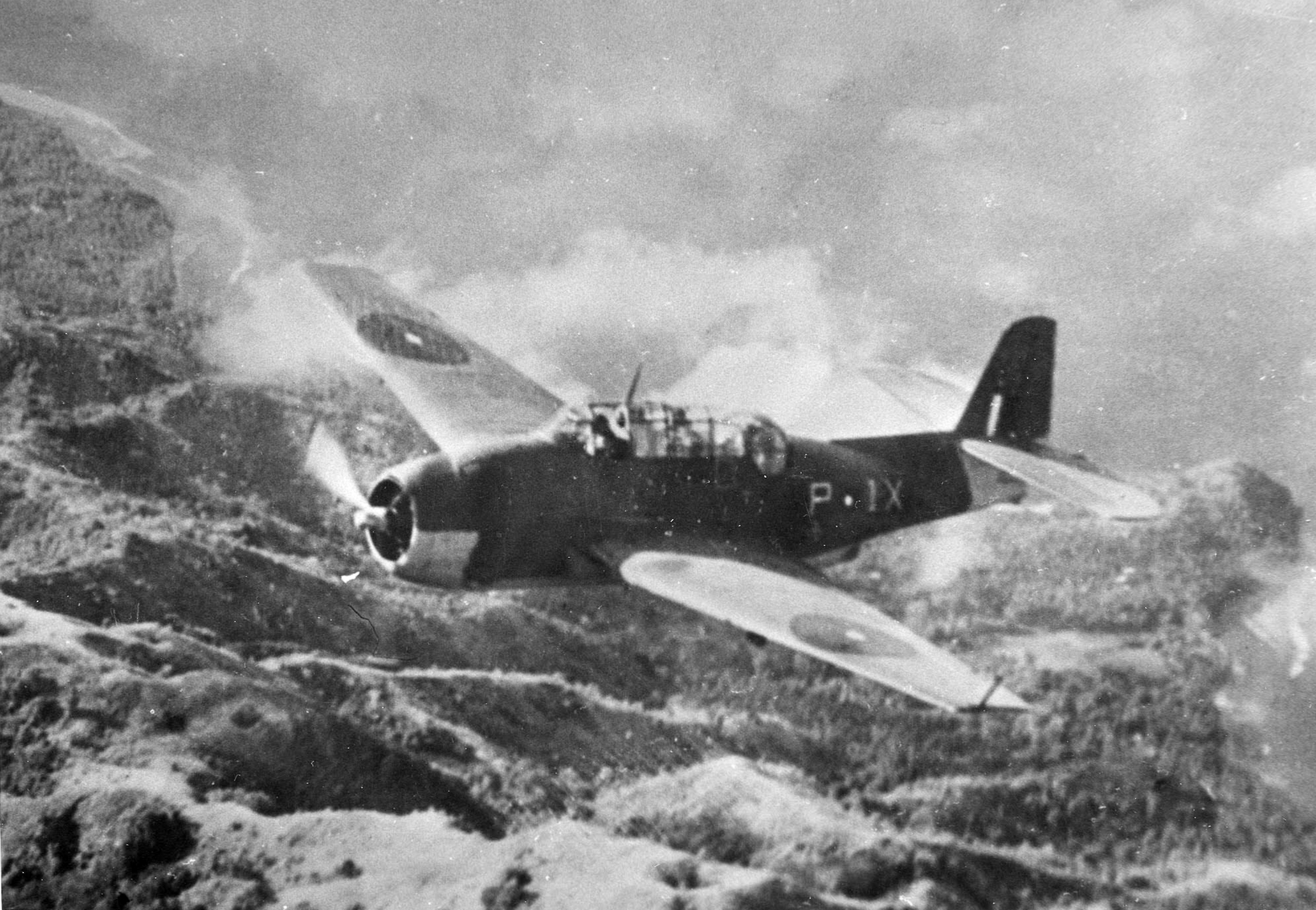
- Grumman Avenger Mk.II; an example of the type used by 855 Squadron
- Active: 1944
- Disbanded: 21 October 1944
- Country: United Kingdom
- Branch: Royal Navy
- Type: Torpedo Bomber Reconnaissance squadron
- Role: Carrier-based: anti-submarine warfare (ASW); anti-surface warfare (ASuW)
- Size: Twelve aircraft
- Home station: See Naval air stations section for full list.
- Mottos: Delere ut protegemu (Latin for 'Annihilate in order to protect')
- Engagements: World War II: European theatre of World War II; Operation Neptune
- Battle honours: Normandy 1944; English Channel 1944; North Sea 1944

Insignia
- Squadron Badge Description: Wartime unofficial: A winged bird over a sinking E-boat, to reflect a number of attacks made off the French coast
- Identification Markings: 5BA+ (Avenger); 5A+ (Avenger May 1944)

Aircraft flown
- Bomber: Grumman Avenger

855 Naval Air Squadron (855 NAS), also referred to as 855 Squadron, is an inactive Fleet Air Arm (FAA) naval air squadron of the United Kingdom’s Royal Navy (RN). It operated Grumman Avenger Mk.II torpedo bomber aircraft during 1944 as part of RAF Coastal Command.

A brief history began in February 1944, when this Torpedo Bomber Reconnaissance squadron was established at Naval Air Station Squantum, United States. They boarded HMS Queen in June to head to the UK. After arriving at RAF Hawkinge, the squadron was quickly assigned to 157 Wing, RAF Coastal Command, and supported the Normandy landings. The squadron was disbanded in October 1944, at HMS Landrail, RNAS Machrihanish.

== History ==
=== Torpedo, Bomber, Reconnaissance squadron (1944) ===
The squadron was officially established on 1 February 1944 at RN Air Section Squantum, which was situated at Naval Air Station Squantum, Quincy, Massachusetts, designated as a Torpedo Bomber Reconnaissance unit, equipped with twelve Grumman Avenger Mk.II torpedo bomber aircraft, which later embarked aboard the Ruler-class escort carrier, HMS Queen.

The aircraft were disembarked at Greenock, Scotland and subsequently transported to RAF Hawkinge, Kent, England. For the following three months, the squadron operated under RAF Coastal Command, within 157 Wing, engaging in anti-shipping patrols that included operations along the coasts of occupied France, Belgium, and the Netherlands.

Following the successful consolidation of the Normandy invasion, the services of the squadron were deemed unnecessary, leading to its disbandment on 21 October, at RNAS Machrihanish (HMS Landrail) in Scotland.

== Aircraft flown ==
855 Naval Air Squadron flew only one aircraft type:

- Grumman Avenger Mk.II torpedo bomber (February - October 1944)

== Battle honours ==
The following Battle Honours have been awarded to 855 Naval Air Squadron:

- Normandy 1944
- English Channel 1944
- North Sea 1944

== Naval air stations / Royal Air Force stations ==
855 Naval Air Squadron operated from a number of naval air stations of the Royal Navy and a number of Royal Air Force stations in the United Kingdom:

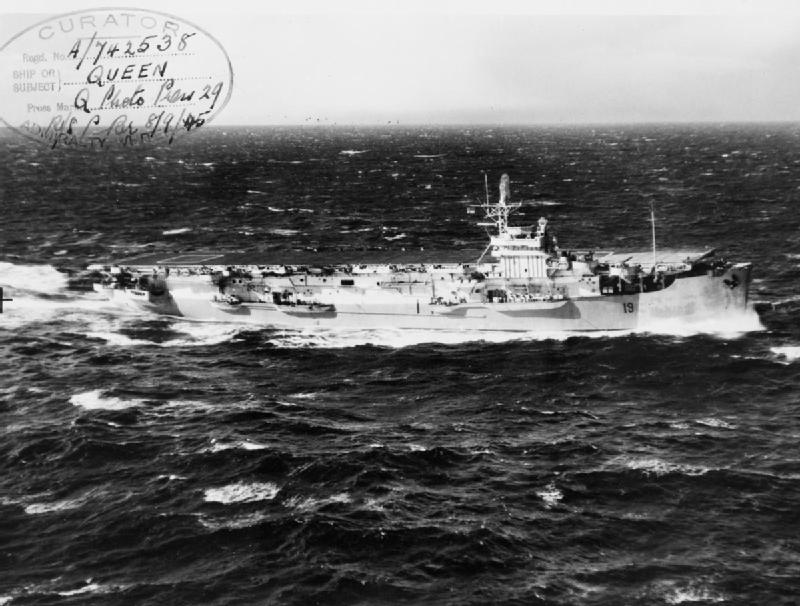
HMS Queen

- RN Air Section Squantum, Massachusetts, (1 February - 1 May 1944)
- RN Air Section Norfolk, Virginia, (1 - 6 May 1944)
- HMS Queen (6 - 23 May 1944)
- Royal Air Force Renfrew, Renfrewshire, (23 - 25 May 1944)
- RN Air Section Speke, Merseyside, (25 - 26 May 1944)
- Royal Air Force Hawkinge, Kent, (26 May - 3 August 1944)
- Royal Air Force Thorney Island, West Sussex, (3 - 7 August 1944)
- Royal Air Force Docking, Norfolk, (7 - 18 August 1944)
- Royal Naval Air Station Lee-on-Solent (HMS Daedalus), Hampshire, (18 August - 7 September 1944)
- Royal Air Force Bircham Newton, Norfolk, (7 - 14 September 1944)
- Royal Air Force Docking, Norfolk, (14 September - 13 October 1944)
- Royal Naval Air Station Machrihanish (HMS Landrail), Argyll and Bute, (13 - 21 October 1944)
- disbanded - (21 October 1944)

== Commanding officers ==
List of commanding officers of 855 Naval Air Squadron:

- Lieutenant Commander J.B. Harrowar, RNR, from 1 February 1944
- disbanded - 21 October 1944
