= No. 143 Squadron RAF =

Defunct flying squadron of the Royal Air Force

- Active: 1 February 1918 – 31 October 1919; 15 June 1941 – 25 May 1945
- Country: United Kingdom
- Branch: Royal Air Force
- Mottos: Latin: Vincere est vivere ("To conquer is to live")

Insignia
- Squadron Badge: A gamecock.
- Squadron Codes: HO (Jun 1941 – Aug 1943, Jul 1944 – Oct 1944) ) NE (Oct 1944 – Jul 1945)

No. 143 Squadron RAF was a Royal Air Force Squadron formed as a fighter unit in the First World War and reformed as an RAF Coastal Command fighter and anti-submarine unit in the Second World War.

== History ==
=== Formation and the First World War ===
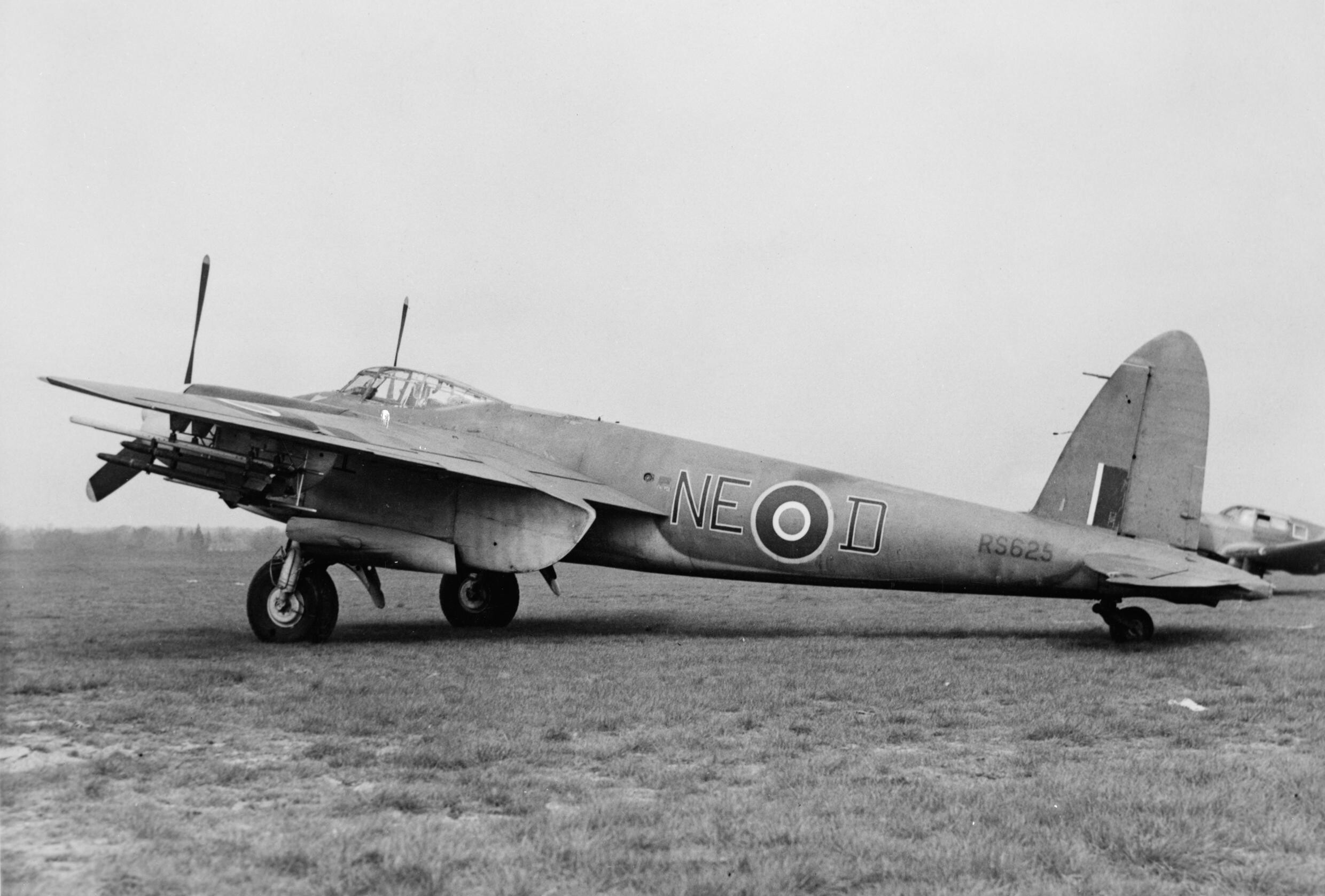
Squadron De Havilland Mosquito

No. 143 Squadron Royal Flying Corps was formed on 1 March 1918 and became a unit of the Royal Air Force a month later, but it disbanded on 31 October 1919 having operated the Sopwith Camel and Sopwith Snipe.

=== Reformation in the Second World War ===
The squadron reformed in June 1941 as a coastal command long range fighter unit based at RAF Aldergrove unit and equipped with the Bristol Beaufighter. It was then stationed in Scotland, Northern Ireland and East Anglia and employed on anti-shipping missions. It re-equipped with the de Havilland Mosquito and was disbanded on 25 May 1945.

== Aircraft operated ==
Aircraft operated by no. 143 Squadron RAF
From	To	Aircraft	Variant
Feb 1918	Mar 1918	Armstrong Whitworth F.K.8	
Mar 1918	Aug 1918	Royal Aircraft Factory S.E.5	A
Aug 1918	Oct 1919	Sopwith Camel	
Jun 1919	Oct 1919	Sopwith Snipe	
Jun 1941	Nov 1941	Bristol Beaufighter	IC
Nov 1941	Nov 1941	Bristol Blenheim	IV
Feb 1942	Oct 1943	Hawker Hurricane	IIB
Aug 1942	Sep 1942	Bristol Beaufighter	IC
Sep 1942	Mar 1943	Bristol Beaufighter	IIF
Mar 1943	May 1944	Bristol Beaufighter	XI
Sep 1943	Oct 1944	Bristol Beaufighter	X
Sep 1944	Oct 1944	de Havilland Mosquito	II
Oct 1944	May 1945	de Havilland Mosquito	VI
