= No. 544 Squadron RAF =

Defunct flying squadron of the Royal Air Force

- Active: 19 October 1942 – 13 October 1945
- Country: United Kingdom
- Branch: Royal Air Force
- Motto(s): Latin: Quero (I seek)

Insignia
- Squadron Badge: A gannet with its head lowered

No. 544 Squadron RAF was a Royal Air Force Squadron formed as a photographic reconnaissance squadron in World War II.

== History ==
The squadron formed at RAF Benson on 19 October 1942 and was equipped with Ansons, a detachment then went to Gibraltar where it operated Wellingtons. It then operated Spitfires and Mosquitos on reconnaissance missions, including Aarhus five days before the air raid on 31 October 1944. It disbanded on 13 August 1945 after hostilities ceased.

== Aircraft operated ==
Aircraft operated by no. 544 Squadron RAF
From	To	Aircraft	Variant
Oct 1942	Mar 1943	Avro Anson	I
Oct 1942	Mar 1943	Martin Maryland	I
Oct 1942	Mar 1943	Vickers Wellington	IV
Oct 1942	Oct 1943	Supermarine Spitfire	IV
Mar 1943	Oct 1943	de Havilland Mosquito	IV
Aug 1943	Oct 1943	Supermarine Spitfire	XI
Aug 1943	Feb 1945	de Havilland Mosquito	IX
Mar 1944	Apr 1945	de Havilland Mosquito	XVI
Oct 1944	Oct 1945	de Havilland Mosquito	XXXII
Apr 1945	Oct 1945	de Havilland Mosquito	XXXIV
