= No. 280 Squadron RAF =

Defunct flying squadron of the Royal Air Force

- Active: 10 December 1941 – 21 June 1946
- Country: United Kingdom
- Branch: Royal Air Force
- Type: Flying squadron
- Role: Air-sea rescue
- Part of: Coastal Command
- Motto(s): We Shall Be There

Insignia
- Squadron Badge: In front of a fountain a hand holding a pole, flying therefrom two flags representing the international distress signal 'N.C'
- Squadron Codes: YF (Feb 1942 – Aug 1943); 3 (Aug 1943 – Jul 1944); ME (Jul 1944 – Jun 1946)

No. 280 Squadron was a Royal Air Force air-sea rescue squadron during the Second World War.

== History ==
No. 280 Squadron was formed at RAF Thorney Island, England on 10 December 1941 as an air-sea rescue squadron. The squadron was equipped with the Avro Anson and was responsible for air-sea rescue along the south coast of England and East Anglia. The squadron re-equipped with the Vickers Warwick in October 1943.

At the end of the Second World War the squadron disbanded at RAF Thornaby on 21 June 1946.

== Aircraft operated ==
Aircraft operated by No. 280 Squadron
From	To	Aircraft	Version
Feb 1942	Oct 1943	Avro Anson	Mk.I
Oct 1943	Jun 1946	Vickers Warwick	Mk.I

== See also ==
- List of Royal Air Force aircraft squadrons
