= No. 86 Squadron RAF =

Defunct flying squadron of the Royal Air Force

- Active: 1 September 1917–4 July 1918; 6 Dec 1940–25 April 1946
- Country: United Kingdom
- Branch: Royal Air Force
- Part of: Coastal Command
- Mottos: Latin: Ad libertatem volamus ("We fly to freedom")
- Aircraft: Bristol Blenheim; Bristol Beaufort; Consolidated Liberator
- Engagements: World War II

Insignia
- Squadron Badge heraldry: A gull volant, carrying in the beak a flash of lightning
- Squadron Codes: BX; XQ

No. 86 Squadron RAF was a unit of the Royal Air Force during World War II. Attached to Coastal Command the unit flew reconnaissance and air-sea rescue missions, anti-shipping strikes, and anti-submarine patrols.

== History ==
=== Formation ===
No. 86 Squadron was first formed on 1 September 1917, but was not yet operational when it was disbanded on 4 July 1918 to provide reinforcements for active units in France. It began to reform as a ground attack squadron on 30 October 1918, but on the signing of the Armistice two weeks later, this was suspended.

=== World War II ===
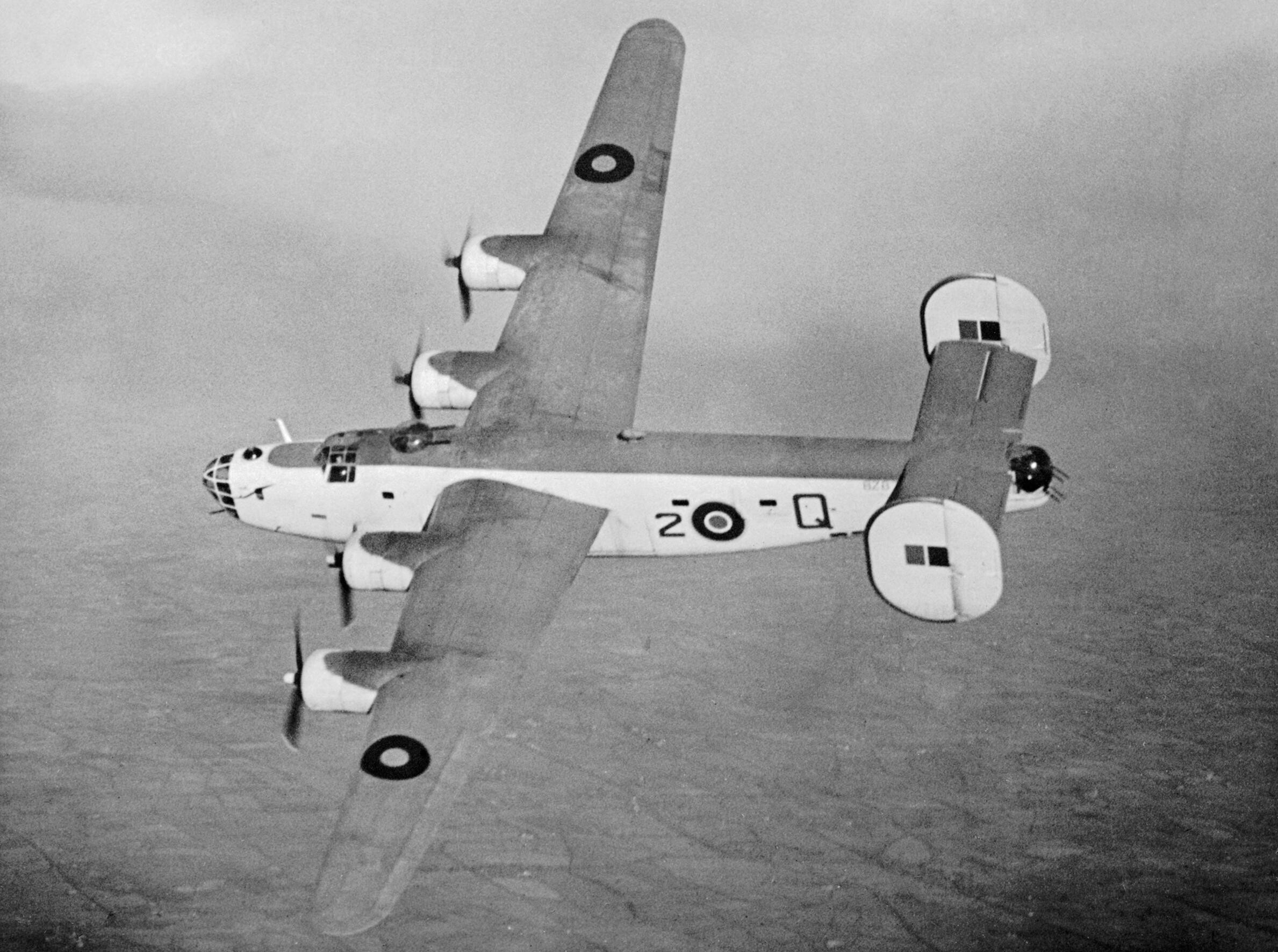
No. 86 Sqn Liberator GR Mk.V, 1943

The squadron was reformed on 6 December 1940, initially flying Bristol Blenheim light bombers on convoy escort duties. In June 1941 the squadron was re-equipped with Bristol Beaufort torpedo bombers, and began minelaying sorties on 15 July. After flying reconnaissance and air-sea rescue missions for three months the squadron started anti-shipping strikes, with the first torpedo bomber operation taking place on 12 December.

In March 1942 the Squadron moved to northern Scotland to engage in patrols and strikes on the Norwegian coast, before being converted to the Consolidated Liberator by early 1943. In March of that year, it moved to Northern Ireland to fly anti-submarine patrols, before moving to RAF Reykjavík, Iceland, a year later. In July 1944 the Squadron returned to Scotland where it remained for the rest of the war.

No. 86 Squadron was a successful anti-submarine unit, accounting for fourteen U-boats destroyed during the Second World War.

=== Post war ===
On 10 June 1945, 86 Squadron joined Transport Command's No. 301 Wing, flying missions to India. Finally, on 25 April 1946, the Squadron was disbanded.

== Aircraft operated ==
Aircraft	Date
Bristol Blenheim Mk.IV	December 1940-July 1941
Bristol Beaufort Mk.I	June 1941-February 1942
Bristol Beaufort Mk.II	January–August 1942
Consolidated Liberator GR Mk.IIIa	October 1942-August 1944
Consolidated Liberator GR Mk.V	March 1943-February 1945
Consolidated Liberator Mk.VIII	February 1945-April 1946
Consolidated Liberator Mk.VI	August 1945-April 1946
