= Operation Orator =

- Part of Arctic naval operations of the Second World War
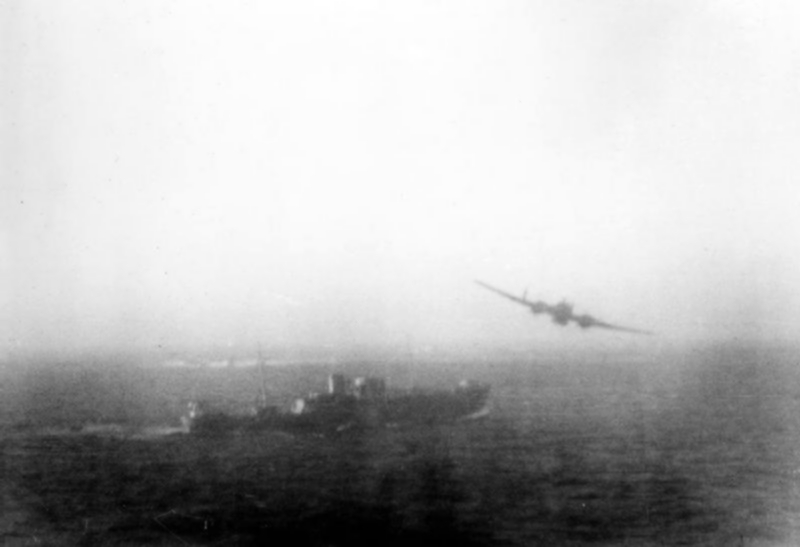
- A Hampden TB.1 of the Leuchars Wing makes a torpedo attack on a German vessel during the Second World War. (A photograph taken by a member of 18 Group on an unrelated operation.)
Date	September 1942
Location	Barents Sea 75°N 40°E
Result	Allied victory

Belligerents
United Kingdom; Australia; Soviet Union (airfields); United States (sea transport)	Germany; Finland (fighter bases)

Commanders and leaders
(United Kingdom) F. L. (Frank) Hopps	(Nazi Germany) Rolf Carls

Units involved
Search & Strike Force Leuchars Wing; 144 Squadron RAF; 455 Squadron RAAF; detachments: 210 Squadron RAF; 1 PRU RAF	Marinegruppenkommando Nord; (Naval Group Command North); Jagdgeschwader 5; (Fighter Wing 5)

Strength
RAAF–RAF; 32 long-range torpedo bombers; 8 long-range maritime patrol aircraft; 5 long-range reconnaissance aircraft	Kriegsmarine; Tirpitz; Admiral Scheer; Admiral Hipper; Köln; 4 destroyers; Luftwaffe; 35–60 fighters

Casualties and losses
Aircrew killed; c. 18; POW c. 12; 9 torpedo bombers; (en route to USSR); 2 PRU Spitfires	

Operation Orator was the code name for the defence of the Allied Convoy PQ 18 by British and Australian air force units, based temporarily in North-West Russia, against attack by the German battleship Tirpitz and other Kriegsmarine surface vessels. The wing, known as the Search & Strike Force, was commanded by Group Captain Frank Hopps and its maritime strike element was the Leuchars Wing, comprising 144 Squadron, Royal Air Force (RAF) and 455 Squadron, Royal Australian Air Force (RAAF) equipped with Handley-Page Hampden TB 1 torpedo bombers.

The Hampden crews made a long and dangerous flight from bases in Scotland (4–5 September) and assembled at Vaenga airfield on the Kola Inlet, 25 mi (40 km) north of Murmansk. The two squadrons lost nine aircraft shot down or crashed in transit but the remainder joined a detachment of 210 Squadron Catalina flying boats and a section of photographic reconnaissance Spitfires from 1 Photographic Reconnaissance Unit to make up the Search & Strike Force (S&SF).

At 7:30 a.m. on 14 September, 23 Hampdens were scrambled, after Tirpitz was reported absent from its moorings. The Hampdens flew to the maximum distance that Tirpitz could have reached then turned to follow the track back to Altafjord, as far as the Catalina cross over patrols. After an uneventful flight, the Hampdens returned at 3:00 p.m. from what turned out to be a false alarm; Tirpitz having moved to a nearby fjord. The S&SF Hampdens stayed at readiness and the Spitfires watched over Tirpitz until October. Operation Orator had deterred the Germans from risking their capital ships against Convoy PQ 18 and after converting the Soviet Air Forces (VVS) to the Hampden and Spitfire aircraft to be left behind, the aircrew and ground personnel returned to Britain.

== Background ==
=== Arctic convoys ===
In October 1941, after Operation Barbarossa, the German invasion of the USSR, which had begun on 22 June, the Prime Minister, Winston Churchill, made a commitment to send a convoy to the Arctic ports of the USSR every ten days and to deliver 1,200 tanks a month from July 1942 to January 1943, followed by 2,000 tanks and another 3,600 aircraft. The first convoy was due at Murmansk around 12 October and the next convoy was to depart Iceland on 22 October. A motley of British, Allied and neutral shipping loaded with military stores and raw materials for the Soviet war effort would be assembled at Hvalfjörður, Iceland, an anchorage convenient for ships from both sides of the Atlantic.

By late 1941, the convoy system used in the Atlantic had been established on the Arctic run; a convoy commodore ensured that the ships' masters and signals officers attended a briefing to make arrangements for the management of the convoy, which sailed in a formation of long rows of short columns. The commodore was usually a retired naval officer, aboard a ship identified by a white pendant with a blue cross. The commodore was assisted by a Naval signals party of four men, who used lamps, semaphore flags and telescopes to pass signals, coded from books carried in a weighted bag, to be dumped overboard in an emergency. In large convoys, the commodore was assisted by vice- and rear-commodores who directed the speed, course and zig-zagging of the merchant ships in co-operation with the escort commander. (Note: By the end of 1941, 187 Matilda II and 249 Valentine tanks had been delivered, comprising 25 per cent of the medium-heavy tanks in the Red Army and 30–40 per cent of the medium-heavy tanks defending Moscow. In December 1941, 16 per cent of the fighters defending Moscow were Hawker Hurricanes and Curtiss Tomahawks from Britain and by 1 January 1942, 96 Hurricane fighters were flying in the Soviet Air Forces (Voyenno-Vozdushnye Sily, VVS). The British supplied radar apparatus, machine tools, Asdic and bulk commodities.)

==== Convoy hiatus ====
Following Convoy PQ 16 and the disaster to Convoy PQ 17 in July 1942, Arctic convoys were suspended for nine weeks and much of the Home Fleet was detached to the Mediterranean. During the lull, Admiral John "Jack" Tovey concluded that the Home Fleet had been of no great protection to convoys once beyond Bear Island, midway between Svalbard and the North Cape of Norway. Tovey planned to oversee the operation from Scapa Flow, where the fleet was linked to the Admiralty by landline and immune to variations in wireless reception. The next convoy was to be accompanied by the longer-range destroyers of the Home Fleet. Along with the close escort force of anti-submarine and anti-aircraft ships, the fleet destroyers could confront a sortie by German ships with the threat of a massed torpedo attack. Instead of meeting homeward-bound QP convoys near Bear Island, QP 14 was to remain in port until Convoy PQ 18 was near its destination, despite the longer journey being more demanding of the escort crews, fuel and equipment. The new escort carrier HMS Avenger (Commander A. P. Colthurst) had arrived from the United States and was added to the escort force.

=== Signals intelligence ===
==== Bletchley Park ====
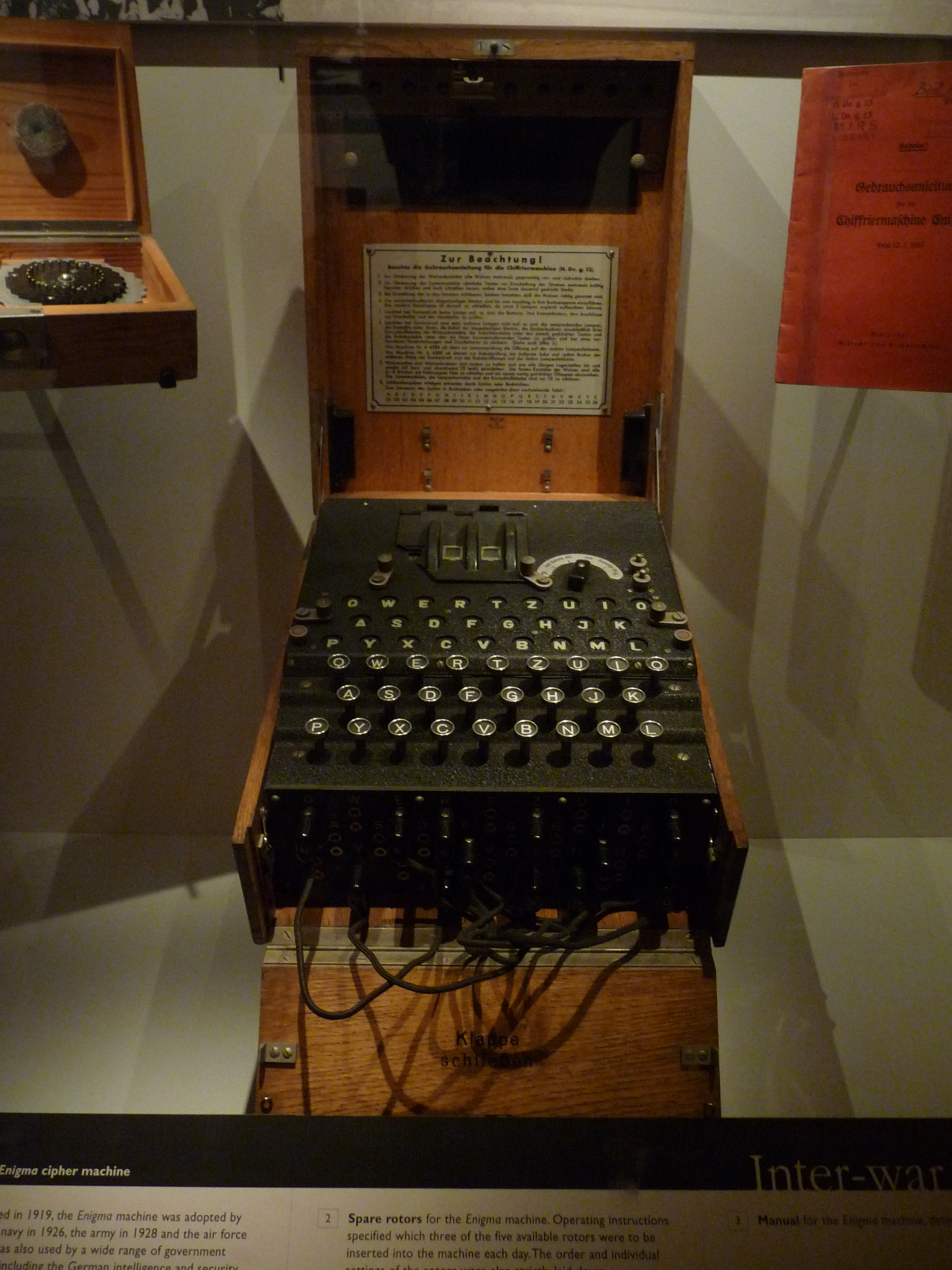
Photograph of a German Enigma coding machine

The British Government Code and Cypher School (GC&CS) based at Bletchley Park housed a small industry of code-breakers and traffic analysts. By June 1941, the German Enigma machine Home Waters (Heimish) settings used by surface ships and U-boats could quickly be read. On 1 February 1942, the Enigma machines used in U-boats in the Atlantic and Mediterranean were changed but German ships and the U-boats in Arctic waters continued with the older Heimish (Hydra from 1942, Dolphin to the British). By mid-1941, British Y-stations were able to receive and read Luftwaffe W/T transmissions and give advance warning of Luftwaffe operations.

In 1941, naval Headache personnel, with receivers to eavesdrop on Luftwaffe wireless transmissions, were embarked on warships and from May 1942, ships gained RAF Y computor (sic) parties, which sailed with cruiser admirals in command of convoy escorts, to interpret Luftwaffe W/T signals intercepted by the Headaches. The Admiralty sent details of Luftwaffe wireless frequencies, call signs and the daily local codes to the computors, which combined with their knowledge of Luftwaffe procedures, could glean fairly accurate details of German reconnaissance sorties. Sometimes computors predicted attacks twenty minutes before they were detected by radar.

==== B-Dienst ====
The rival German Beobachtungsdienst (B-Dienst, Observation Service) of the Kriegsmarine Marinenachrichtendienst (MND, Naval Intelligence Service) had broken several Admiralty codes and cyphers by 1939, which were used to help Kriegsmarine ships elude British forces and provide opportunities for surprise attacks. From June to August 1940, six British submarines were sunk in the Skaggerak using information gleaned from British wireless signals. In 1941, B-Dienst read signals from the Commander in Chief Western Approaches informing convoys of areas patrolled by U-boats, enabling the submarines to move into "safe" zones. B-Dienst had broken Naval Cypher No 3 in February 1942 and by March was reading up to 80 per cent of the traffic, which continued until 15 December 1943. By coincidence, the British lost access to the Shark cypher and had no information to send in Cypher No 3 which might compromise Ultra. In early September, Finnish Radio Intelligence deciphered a Soviet Air Force transmission which divulged the convoy itinerary and forwarded it to the Germans.

==== Allied Arctic operations ====
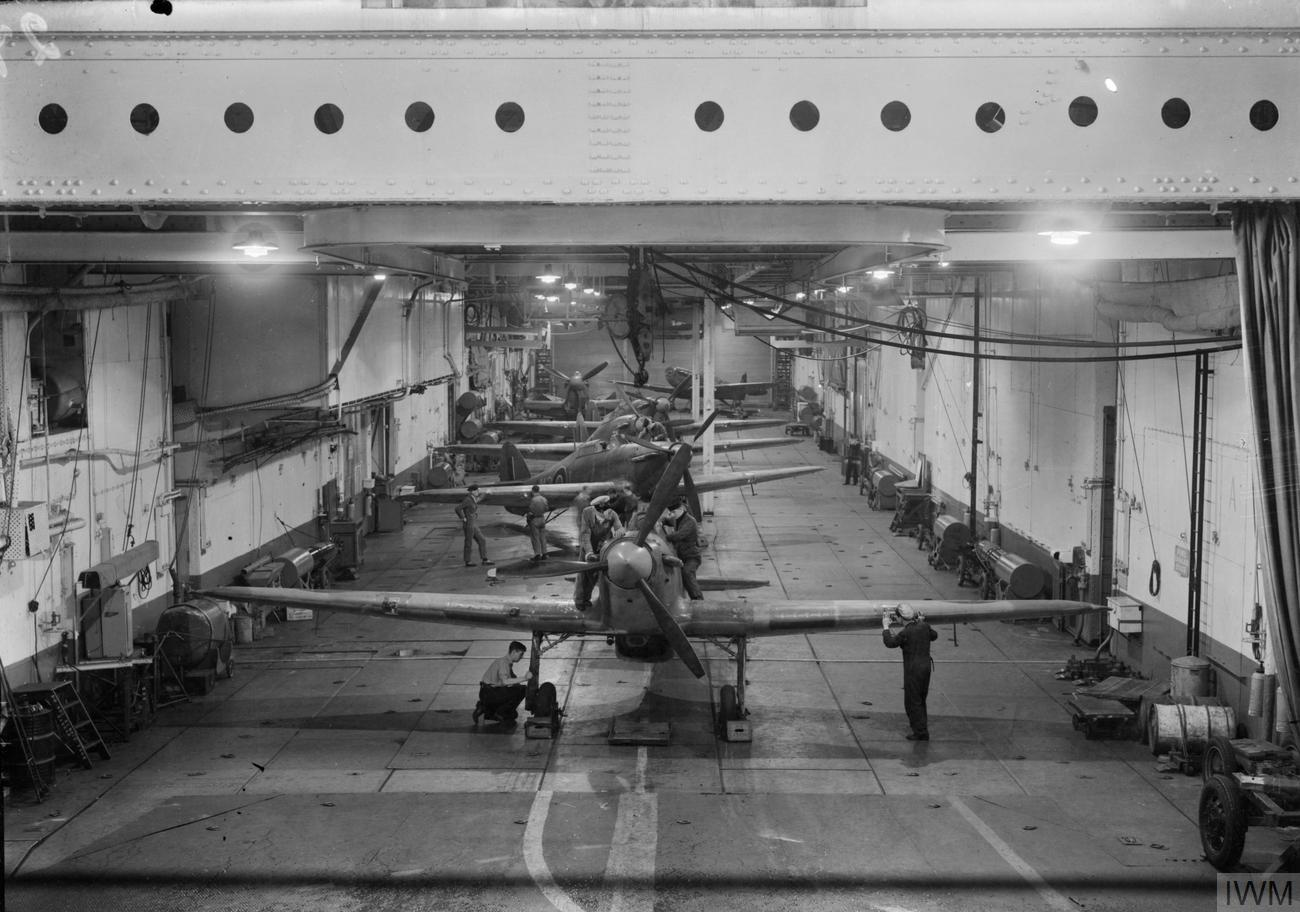
Five Sea Hurricanes in the hangar of HMS Argus (1942–1944)

As Arctic convoys passed by the North Cape of Norway into the Barents Sea, they were easily within range of German aircraft, U-boats and ships based in Norway and Finland. The ships were still vulnerable while unloading at Murmansk, Arkhangelsk and Polyarny and Hawker Hurricane fighters delivered by the first Arctic convoy, were intended for air defence against the Luftwaffe. In Operation Dervish (21–31 August 1941), six elderly freighters sailed from Iceland for Arkhangelsk carrying wood, rubber, tin and fifteen crated Hawker Hurricane fighters. In Operation Strength, the aircraft carrier HMS Argus carried 24 Hurricanes concurrent with the convoy, escorted by three cruisers with the RAF ground party. When Argus was in range of Vayenga, the Hurricanes were flown off and all reached their destination.

No. 151 Wing RAF (Wing Commander Neville Ramsbottom-Isherwood) flew in the defence of Murmansk for five weeks and claimed 16 victories, four probables and seven aircraft damaged. The winter snows began on 22 September and the conversion of Soviet Air Force (VVS, Voyenno-Vozdushnye Sily) pilots and ground crews to the Hurricane Mk IID began in mid-October and in late November the RAF party returned to Britain, less various signals staff. The Allied Operation Gauntlet (25 August – 3 September 1941), Fritham (30 April 1942 – 2 July 1943) had taken place in the Svalbard Archipelago on the main island of Spitsbergen, midway between northern Norway the North Pole, to eliminate German weather stations and to stop its coal exports to Norway. In Operation Gearbox II (2–21 September 1942) two cruisers and a destroyer took 200 long tons (203 t) of supplies and equipment to Spitsbergen. On 3 September, Force P, the oilers RFA Blue Ranger, RFA Oligarch and four destroyer escorts sailed for Van Mijenfjorden (Lowe Sound) in Spitsbergen and from 9 to 13 September refuelled destroyers detached from Convoy PQ 18.

=== German plans ===
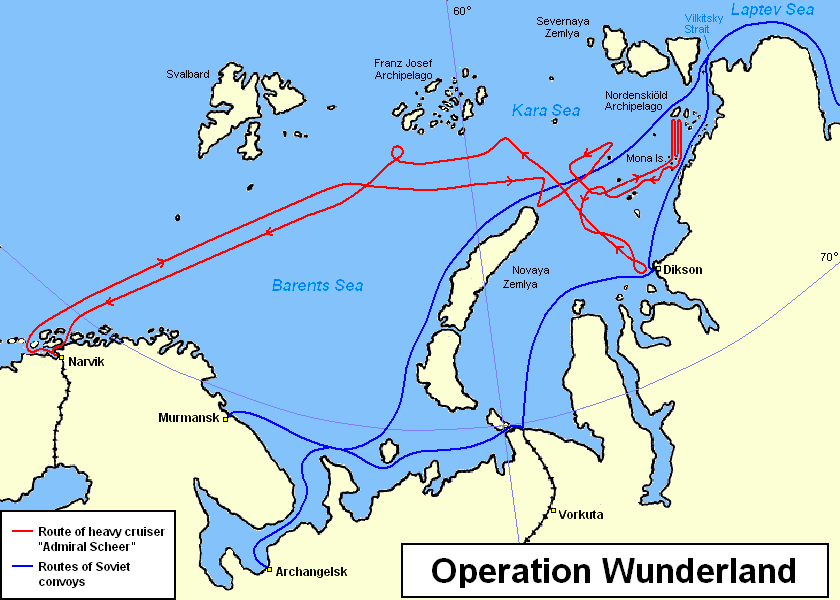
Route of Unternehmen Wunderland

Authority in the Kriegsmarine was derived from the Seekriegsleitung (SKL, Supreme Naval Command) in Berlin and Arctic operations were commanded by Admiral Boehm, the Admiral Commanding Norway, from the Marinegruppenkommando Nord (Naval Group North) HQ in Kiel. Three flag officers were detached to Oslo in command of minesweeping, coast defence, patrols and minelaying off the west, north and polar coasts. The large surface ships and U-boats were under the command of the Flag Officer Northern Waters at Narvik, who did not answer to Boehm but had authority over the Flag Officer Battlegroup, who commanded the ships when at sea. The Flag Officer Northern Waters also had tactical control of aircraft from Luftflotte 5 (Generaloberst Hans-Jürgen Stumpff) when they operated in support of the Kriegsmarine. The Norwegian-based aircraft had tactical headquarters at Kirkenes, Trondheim and Bardufoss. The Luftwaffe HQs were separate from the Kriegsmarine commanders except at Kirkenes, with the Flag Officer Polar Coast.

On 24 June, a British minesweeper based at Kola was sunk by Ju 87 Stuka dive-bombers and on 16 August, Admiral Scheer conducted Operation Wunderland (Unternehmen Wunderland), a sortie against Russian ships thought to be sailing along the route north of Siberia. Admiral Scheer sailed north of Novaya Zemlya and then to the east and sank a Soviet icebreaker; by 30 August Admiral Scheer was back in Narvik. B-Dienst signals interception and documents recovered from the crashed Hampden UB-C, revealed the crossover and escort changeover points of Convoy PQ 18 and Convoy QP 14 and other details including Operation Orator. U-boats, destroyers and the minelayer Ulm sailed on Operation Zar (Unternehmen Zar) to sow mines at the entrance of the White Sea and off Novaya Zemlya. On 25 August, Ultra revealed the itinerary of Ulm and three of the destroyers with USS Tuscaloosa south of Bear Island, were sent to intercept the ship; Ulm was sunk that night and sixty survivors were taken prisoner. The Germans had to press Admiral Hipper into service as a minelayer. Tirpitz, the cruiser Lützow and three destroyers had been in dock for repairs since Unternehmen Rosselsprung against Convoy PQ 17 (2–5 July) and were not available. Twelve U-boats formed a patrol group in the Norwegian Sea against Convoy PQ 18 and the Kriegsmarine planned Unternehmen Doppelschlag (Operation Double Hit) in which the cruisers Admiral Scheer, Admiral Hipper and Köln with four destroyer escorts, would sail against the convoy.

==== Goldene Zange (Golden Comb) ====
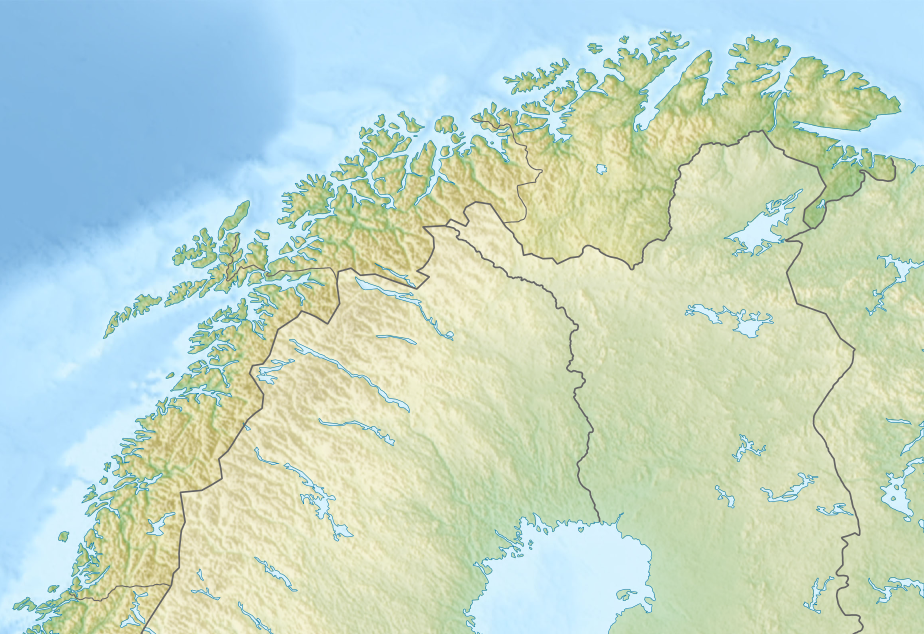
Northern Norway marked with Kriegsmarine and Luftwaffe bases

The Luftwaffe used the lull after Convoy PQ 17 to assemble a force of 35 Junkers Ju 88 A-4 dive-bombers of Kampfgeschwader 30 (KG 30) and 42 torpedo-bombers of Kampfgeschwader 26 (I./KG 26 with 28 Heinkel He 111 H-6s and III/KG 26 with 14 Ju 88 A-4s) to join the reconnaissance aircraft of Luftflotte 5. After analysing the results of anti-shipping operations against Convoy PQ 17, in which the crews of Luftflotte 5 made exaggerated claims of ships sunk, including a cruiser, the anti-shipping units devised the Goldene Zange (Golden Comb). Ju 88 bombers were to divert the defenders with medium and dive bombing attacks as the torpedo-bombers approached out of the twilight. The torpedo bombers were to fly towards the convoy in line abreast, at wave-top height to evade radar, as the convoy was silhouetted against the lighter sky, then drop their torpedoes in a salvo. When B-Dienst discovered that an aircraft carrier would accompany the next convoy, Reichsmarschall Hermann Göring gave orders that it must be sunk first; Luftwaffe aircrew were told that the destruction of the convoy was the best way to help the German army at Stalingrad and in southern Russia.

== Operation Orator ==
=== Plan ===
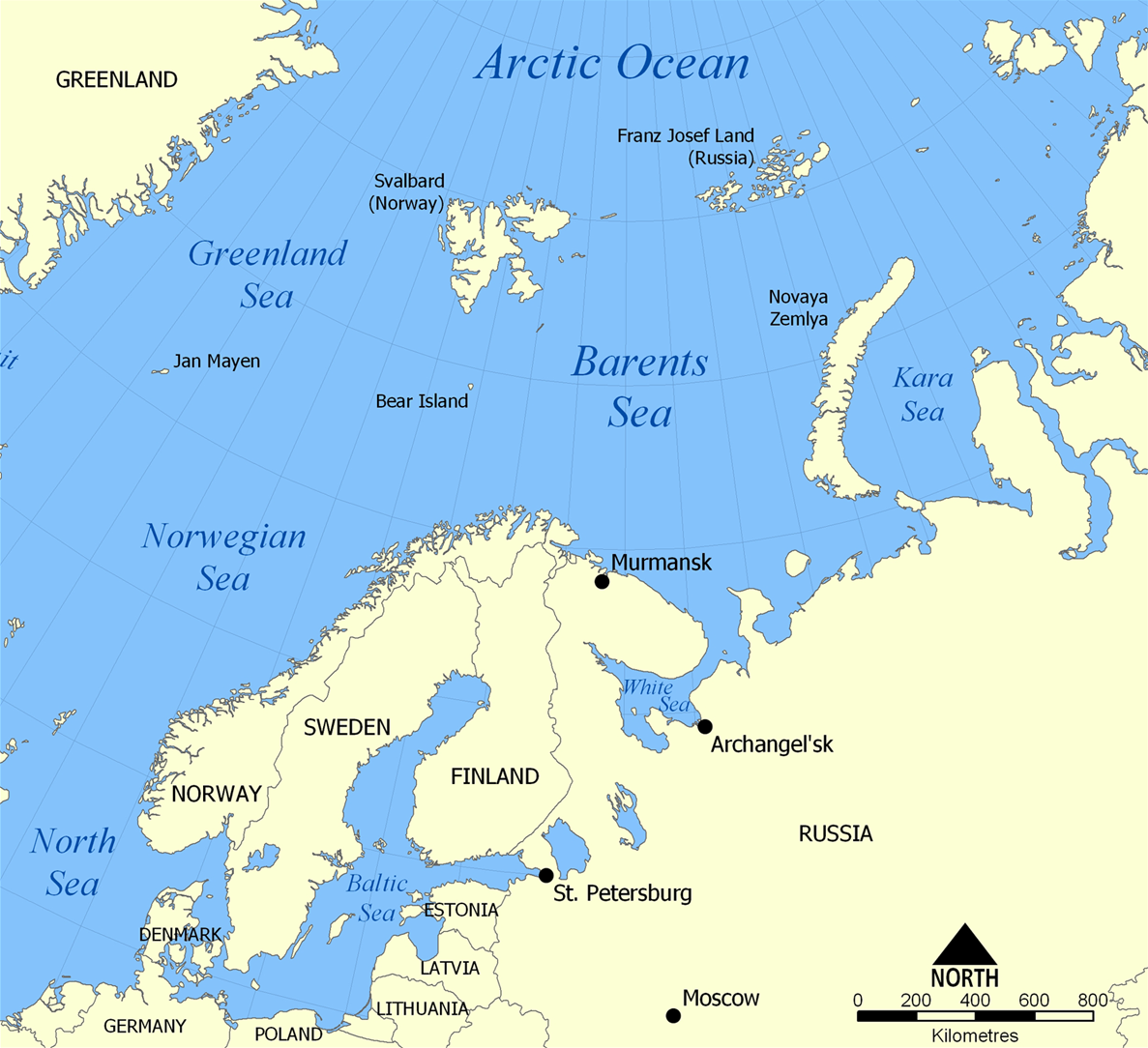
Map of the Barents Sea

A Search & Strike Force (S&SF), commanded by Group Captain Frank Hopps, was to fly to north Russia and operate over the Barents Sea. The maritime strike element comprised 16 Handley Page Hampden torpedo-bombers each from 144 Squadron, Royal Air Force (RAF) and 455 Squadron, Royal Australian Air Force (RAAF). The search element comprised nine Catalinas detached from 210 Squadron RAF from RAF Sullom Voe, in Shetland, to operate from Lake Lakhta near Arkhangelsk, to keep watch on the waters north of Altafjord and a section of three RAF 1 Photographic Reconnaissance Unit (1 PRU) Extra-Super-Long-Range Spitfire PR Mk IV(D) flown from RAF Sumburgh in Shetland, to operate from Afrikanda to watch over Tirpitz. (Note: Some sources describe 144 Squadron as Canadian, a false impression because Canadian Associated Aircraft (Quebec Group) had manufactured many of the Hampdens involved in the operation and Royal Canadian Air Force (RCAF) personnel were attached to 144 and 455 squadrons; neither was an RCAF Article XV squadron.) The Spitfires and Catalinas were to keep watch on the bigger Kriegsmarine ships in Norwegian waters, including the battleship Tirpitz, to attack them at the first opportunity.

=== Despatch of the Search & Strike Force ===
On 13 August, Hopps, RAF and RAAF ground staff and a medical unit sailed for Russia on the cruiser Tuscaloosa, along with three destroyers (two US and one British). (Note: The destroyers USS Rodman, USS Emmons and HMS Onslaught. The ships began the return journey on 24 August, with survivors from Convoy PQ 17.) Hopps was to establish an HQ at Polyarny on the Kola Inlet, 37 mi (60 km) north-north-east of Murmansk. The three PRU Spitfires for the Search & Strike Force departed from Sumburgh, Shetland on 1 September on a journey of more than 1,210 mi (1,950 km) over the North Sea, occupied Norway, Sweden (in breach of Swedish neutrality) the Gulf of Bothnia and Finland (at the time an Axis power) to Afrikanda in north Russia and arrived safely after a 4 1/2-hour flight. The 210 Squadron Catalinas had to remain on operations until the last minute and their equipment and ground crews also had to travel by air but the distance was easily within Catalina range.

On 2 September 1942, as Convoy PQ 18 departed from Loch Ewe, the 32 Hampdens of the Search & Strike Force flew from their base at RAF Leuchars to Sumburgh. The safe range for a Hampden not carrying a torpedo or overload tanks was thought to be a maximum of 1,040 nmi (1,930 km; 1,200 mi). There was no time to fit long-range fuel tanks and each Hampden was to carry a member of the ground staff, the rest travelling to Murmansk on Tuscaloosa, with the Mk XII torpedoes, munitions and other stores. If the Hampdens flew at 125 kn (232 km/h; 144 mph) and did not need rich mixture for manoeuvring, the range to dry tanks might be stretched to 1,360 nmi (2,520 km; 1,570 mi), when the safe route from Sumburgh to Vayenga was 1,314 nmi (2,434 km; 1,512 mi). On 3 September an attempt to send the squadrons to Russia despite an unfavourable weather report, in fear of even worse weather to come, was refused by McLaughlin and Lindeman, and the squadrons waited for better weather.

Late on 4 September, the Hampdens of the Leuchars Wing took off for Russia. Their route would keep the Hampdens a minimum of 60 nmi (110 km; 69 mi) from German-occupied territory but was clearly too risky. A flight along the Norwegian coast would cover 1,200 nmi (2,200 km; 1,400 mi), parts easily in range of the Luftwaffe. A direct route over the mountains of Norway would be only 1,100 nmi (2,000 km; 1,300 mi) long but the fuel consumed in climbing high enough would leave little left to overcome head winds, engine trouble, navigation errors or a landing delay. The Hampden crews were to follow a route similar to that of the Spitfires, flying north to Burrafirth in Shetland and the fly on a course to reach Norway at 66°N, cross the mountains in the dark, overfly northern Sweden and Finland, before landing at the Soviet air base at Afrikanda, at the southern end of Murmansk Oblast. The flight to Afrikanda was expected to take five to eight hours, depending on the weather and German opposition. After refuelling, the Hampden crews were to fly the remaining 120 mi (190 km) to Vayenga, following the Kandalaksha–Murmansk railway northwards.

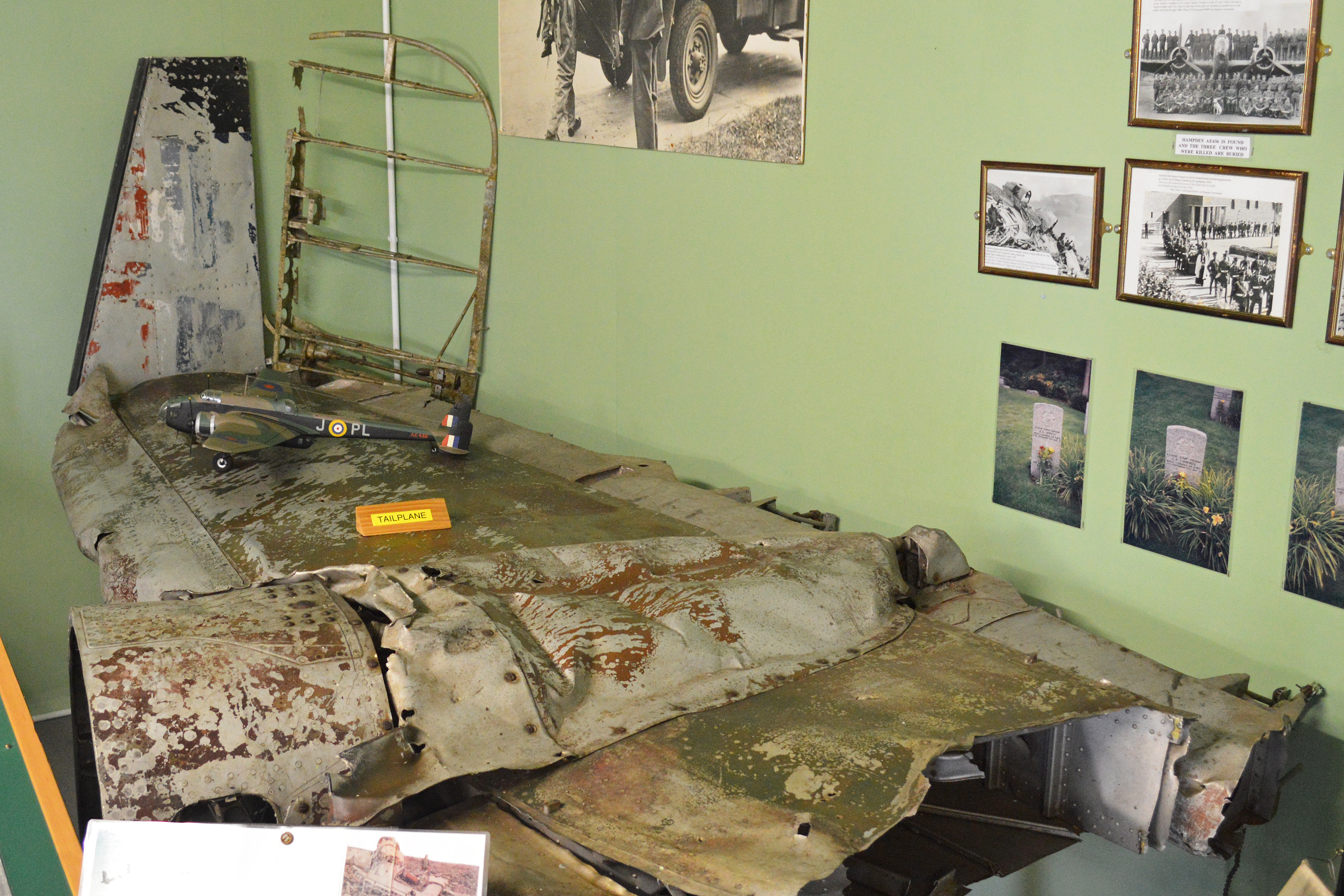
Part of the wrecked tail section of Hampden AE436 ("PL-J"), 144 Squadron RAF. In the background is a scale model of the same aircraft; AE436, crashed in Sweden on 4 September 1942, en route to Russia.

Two Hampdens crashed in northern Sweden, near Arjeplog; both crashes were thought to have been caused by atmospheric icing. Four RAAF, three RCAF and one RAFVR crew were killed and buried at Kviberg Cemetery, Gothenburg. There were no survivors from Hampden P5304 ("UB-H") of 455 Squadron, pilot Sgt Edward Smart, when it crashed on 4/5 September by lake Arvestuottar, after passing over the larger lake Arvesjaure (sv) to the north-west. (Note: The Swedish aviation historian Bengt Hermansson cited an official report stating that the aircraft clock of P5304 had stopped at 1:04 a.m. (The time zone is not known.); the Hampden had hit the ground at a steep angle and exploded, creating a large crater. The report and wreckage indicated engine failure, probably due to carburettor icing. If ice had accumulated on the control surfaces, the failure of one engine may have led to the Hampden entering a sudden, stall dive. Swedish witnesses claimed that a Luftwaffe fighter had pursued P5304 over the Norwegian border and may have shot it down. Harald Jörgensen, a Swedish Home Guard officer stationed in Arjeplog, wrote later that the flight of Allied aircraft across the area, en route from Britain to Murmansk was well-known and that these flights passed near a Luftwaffe base at Bodø in Norway. Juho Grufvisare, a Sami reindeer herder, told Jörgensen that a twin-engined aircraft had been shot down in early September 1942, near Arvedstuottar, after crossing the Swedish border near Strimasund. Grufvisare claimed to have seen the shooting down from the Karats area, had been so frightened that he abandoned his herd, returned to his home in Jokkmokk and reported the incident to police.) Hampden AE436 ("PL-J", 144 Squadron) pilot Pilot Officer (P/O) David Evans, crashed in the Sarek National Park on Tsatsa, a massif located between the valleys of Njåtjosvagge (sv) and Tjuoltavagge (sv), about 15 nmi (28 km; 17 mi) north of the intended route. Evans and his supernumerary, Corporal Bernard Sowerby, survived the crash and made a three-day trek to the nearest village. Under international law, combatant aircraft entering a neutral country during wartime have normally been subject to impounding and their crews to internment and these laws were being enforced. To avoid internment, Evans and Sowerby told the Swedish authorities that they had crashed in Norway and walked across the border; they were repatriated to Britain on 21 September. (Note: The wreckage of the Hampden and the remains of those killed in the crash were found 5,000 ft (1,500 m) up Tsatsa in 1976.)

Four Hampdens were either shot down or forced to land in German-held territory. AT109 ("UB-C") of 455 Squadron, pilot Sqn Ldr James Catanach, landed on a beach in northern Norway after being damaged by flak from a German submarine chaser and the crew were taken prisoner. (Note: In March 1944, Catanach was among 50 escapees murdered by German security forces, after they had taken part in the "Great Escape", from Stalag Luft III.) Hampden AT138 "PL-C" of 144 Squadron, was attacked over Finland by a fighter of Jagdgeschwader 5 (JG 5); three crew and one passenger were killed. Sergeant J. C. R. (John) Bray, the pilot, bailed out and became a prisoner of war. AT138 crashed near Alakurtti. (Note: Bray of 144 Squadron was an Australian serving in the RAF (service no. 1384708). He was discharged with the rank of Warrant Officer. (Australian Ex-Prisoners of War Memorial, 2013–2018 World War 2 (B) Access-date, 17 June 2018) The location of the wreck was discovered in 1991 and the crew were buried with full military honours at the Allied cemetery in Arkhangelsk in 1993.(The Herald, 1993, "Laid to rest with tears and a salute, the four heroes who gave their lives in a foreign field". Access-date, 17 June 2018)) P1344 "PL-K", pilot P/O E. H. P. Perry, suffered from icing and was forced to take an alternate, lower altitude route. The Hampden flew over the Luftwaffe base at Petsamo, where P1344 was damaged by FlaK; it was then attacked by two Messerschmitt Bf 109 fighters of JG 5. During a crash-landing in an Axis-held part of the Kola Peninsula, three crewmembers were killed and Perry was seriously injured; he and his passenger were taken prisoner. P1273 "PL-Q", pilot Sgt H. L. (Hank) Bertrand, was attacked by fighters from JG 5 near Petsamo; the crew and passenger bailed out and were captured. (Note: Sergeant Henry Lewis (Hank) Bertrand 10772247 was a Canadian serving in the RAF.) Plans for Convoy PQ 18 and Convoy QP 14 were recovered by the Germans from "UB-C" and with a decoded signal from the Soviet 95th Naval Flight Regiment, provided the Germans with the itinerary for both convoys.

Poor visibility in the Afrikanda area made landings difficult and two Hampden pilots, Sqn Ldr Dennis Foster (144 Sqn) and Sqn Ldr Jack Davenport (455 Sqn), landed on a mud airstrip at Monchegorsk, about 30 mi (48 km) to the north. Davenport did so after his Hampden was intercepted by VVS fighter pilots, who directed him to land. Two Hampdens ran out of fuel over Russia and were damaged in forced landings at or near Afrikanda. One pilot made a wheels-up landing in soft ground at Khibiniy, several miles north of Afrikanda and the other Hampden was written off after hitting tree stumps. A further Hampden was lost on the Afrikanda–Murmansk leg. AE356, pilot Sgt Walter Hood (144 Sqn), was caught up in a German air raid over the Kola Inlet and was attacked in error by VVS fighter pilots. Forced to ditch in a lake, the crew were strafed in the water and the ventral gunner, Sgt Walter Tabor (RCAF) died, either from bullet wounds or drowning when the aircraft sank. The survivors got ashore and received small-arms fire from Soviet troops until they were recognised as Allies (from their shouts of "Angliski"); 23 Hampdens arrived at Soviet airfields intact or with only minor damage.

=== Convoy PQ 18 ===
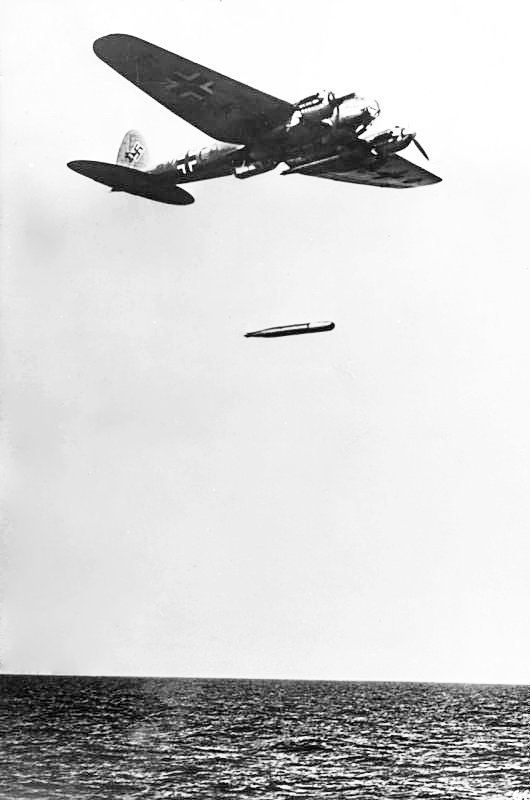
Photograph of a Heinkel 111 just after a torpedo drop

The German surface force at Narvik had been alerted when Convoy PQ 18 was first sighted and on 10 September sailed north to Altafjord past the British submarines HMS Tribune and HMS Tigris. Tigris made an abortive torpedo attack on Admiral Scheer and erroneously reported it as Tirpitz. Soon after midnight on 10/11 September, the Admiralty supplied Enigma messages to the British escort commander that Admiral Hipper was due at Altafjord at 3:00 a.m. and in the afternoon reported that Tirpitz was still at Narvik. On 13 September, Enigma showed that the ships at Altafjord had come to one hours' notice at 4:50 p.m. which was relayed to the convoy escort commander at 11:25 p.m. Enigma showed that Tirpitz was still in Narvik on 14 September and on 16 September, a Swedish source, A2, reported that only Admiral Hipper, Admiral Scheer and Koln would operate against Convoy PQ 18. Doppeslschlag had already been called off on 13 September; Hitler, reluctant to risk the loss of any of his capital ships on an offensive operation, had refused to authorise a sortie.

Admiral Scheer and its escorts remained far to the north of Convoy PQ 18 as the convoy rounded the North Cape. Operation EV, the escort operation for the forty Allied freighters in the convoy comprised an exceptionally large number of navy ships, including Avenger, the first escort carrier to accompany an Arctic convoy. Detailed information on German intentions was provided by Allied code breakers, through Ultra signals decrypts and eavesdropping on Luftwaffe wireless communications. From 12 to 21 September, Convoy PQ 18 was attacked by bombers, torpedo-bombers, U-boats and mines, which sank thirteen ships at a cost of forty-four aircraft and four U-boats. The escort ships and the aircraft of Avenger were able to use signals intelligence from the Admiralty to provide early warning of some air attacks and to attempt evasive routeing of the convoy around concentrations of U-boats. The convoy handed over its distant escorts and Avenger to the homeward bound Convoy QP 14 near Arkhangelsk on 16 September and continued with the close escort and local escorts, riding out a storm in the northern Dvina estuary and the last attacks by the Luftwaffe, before reaching Arkhangelsk on 21 September.

=== Air operations from Russia ===
The Catalinas of 210 Squadron were to provide a close escort for Convoy PQ 18 at the beginning and end of its journey. The aircraft based at Shetland and Iceland carried depth charges instead of overload tanks and on 23 September, an aircraft from Shetland sank U-253, 115 nmi (213 km; 132 mi) off Cape Langanaes, Iceland. The Catalina detachment based in Russia carried overload tanks instead of depth charges and could only menace the U-boats and report their positions to Allied naval ships. The main task of the Catalinas was to maintain ten crossover patrols, AA to KK, 100 nmi (190 km; 120 mi) from the Norwegian coast, from west of Narvik to east of the North Cape. It would be impossible for a sortie by the German ships in north Norway to pass through without being detected by Air to Surface Vessel (ASV) radar. As Convoy PQ 18 sailed around Norway, the patrol areas moved north-eastwards; AA to CC were flown by the Catalinas from Shetland, as were DD to EE but the aircraft flew on to Russia. EE was the furthest from both bases and five aircraft were necessary to keep continuously one aircraft in the patrol area; areas FF to KK were flown by the detachment in Russia. The flights from Shetland could take 16 hours before the first landfall and low stratus cloud often prevented celestial navigation, the crew having to rely on dead reckoning instead.

The Catalinas detached to Russia, were based at Lake Lakhta near Arkhangelsk on the White Sea; using Grasnaya on the Kola Inlet as an advanced base. The communications between them were impossible; Hopps used Grasnaya instead, which was 400 nmi (740 km; 460 mi) nearer to the patrol areas and equally closer to occupied Norway. Lake Lakhta became a rest area and the base for close escort of Convoy PQ 18, once it was on the final leg of the journey. The Catalinas bound for Russia left Shetland in sequence, completed the circuits of their patrol area and proceeded to Russia. From above, the Arctic tundra looked uninviting but having landed, the crews found the Soviet Naval Aviation (Morskaya Aviatsiya) base at Lake Lakhta an idyllic setting, lying amidst woods and cliffs. Russian ground crews were found to be very efficient, impressing the British with their ability to improvise. The damaged Hampden from Khibiniy was put back into service and a Catalina damaged by a Luftwaffe aircraft was hauled ashore within eight minutes of landing and swiftly repaired; once begun, work went on until aircraft were serviceable. The flight from Lake Lakhta to Grasnaya took about five hours and once over Convoy PQ 18, the Catalina would circle it, keeping a careful watch on aircraft nearby in case of mistaken identity.

By 5 September, the serviceable Hampdens were at Vayenga, further back from the front line than Polyarny. The airfield was bombed several times by the Luftwaffe and a Spitfire to be written off on 9 September but there were no casualties. An Area Combined HQ was set up at Polyarny, where a Senior British Naval Officer, Rear-Admiral Douglas Fisher was already installed. The PR Spitfires at Vayenga had their RAF roundels painted out and replaced by red stars: oblique F 24 cameras were used on twelve sorties to Narvik and Altafjord, flying through foul weather to keep watch over the German ships. To replace the written off Spitfire, 1 PRU despatched another Spitfire, which arrived from Britain on 16 September, along with a de Havilland Mosquito PR Mk I (W4061).

On the night of 13/14 September, communications between Convoy PQ 18 and Lake Lakhta failed, a Catalina at Grasnaya was unable to take off until dawn and the PR sortie found Altafjord covered by cloud. If the Catalina sent a sighting report, it would come too late for the Hampdens to attack and as a precaution, Hopps ordered the 23 operational Hampdens up 5:00 a.m. on 14 September, for a reconnaissance in force. Each aircraft carried an 18 inch Mark XII torpedo and the force flew to the maximum distance that Tirpitz could have reached then turned to follow the track back to Altafjord, as far as the Catalina patrol zone. After a flight of 7 1/2 hours, the Hampdens returned at 3:00 p.m., later to discover that Tirpitz had merely moved to a nearby fiord. The other German ships were photographed at Altafiord by the PR Spitfires on 14, 15 and 16 September.

By late September, the S&SF was experiencing increased attention from the Luftwaffe. The Hampdens remained dispersed around Vayenga airfield, receiving some damage during air raids. One of the PR pilots, F/O Gavin Walker, was killed on a sortie to Altafiord, when Spitfire BP889 was shot down near Lakselv, Norway between 11:30 a.m. and midday on 27 September. Luftwaffe records attributed the loss to Gefreiter Kurt Dobner a fighter pilot of 11./JG 5 based at Banak airfield in a Focke-Wulf Fw 190. Some sources suggest that Walker was hit by ground fire near Alta airfield, on the outward leg to the fiord. Vayenga airfield was bombed the same day by two Ju 88s in a low-level raid. The pilot of a VVS Yak fighter, who had dived on the Ju 88s from approximately 9,000 ft (2,700 m), was forced to bail out when the tail of his aircraft was shot off by Soviet anti-aircraft fire. The Yak crashed through the roof of a three-storey barracks assigned to S&SF commissioned officers and the building caught fire; the S&SF suffered no casualties and its members helped to put out the fire.

== Aftermath ==
=== Analysis ===
Operation Orator was called a success by J. H. W. Lawson in his history of 455 Squadron (1951) and in 1975, Peter Smith wrote that intelligence from B-Dienst and documents recovered from the Hampden crash about Operation Orator may have deterred a surface attack on Convoy PQ 18 by Admiral Scheer and its escorts. In the 2005 edition of Arctic Airmen... Ernest Schofield and Roy Nesbit wrote that "it is reasonable to assume that the aircraft based in north Russia had worried the German commander". (Note: The authors also wrote that the operations at Spitsbergen had an indirect influence on the success of Convoy PQ 18, because Fritham and Gearbox made it safe for tankers to anchor and refuel destroyer escorts from the convoy, free from interference by German ground forces.) Chris Mann in a 2012 study of British wartime strategy towards Norway, called it an expensive victory and in 2017, Jan Forsgren in a book on RAF attacks on Tirpitz called the operation a success, because no Axis surface vessels approached Convoy PQ 18. The convoy was also judged a success by the Allies, having revived the Arctic convoy route to the USSR and because Tirpitz, Admiral Scheer, Admiral Hipper and Köln had been deterred by Operation Orator from attacking the convoy.

In 2011, Michael Walling called the loss of nine Hampdens on the transit flight, the equivalent of the loss anticipated on an attack against a big warship, a disaster. The surviving Hampdens were to be flown back to Scotland but the crews had doubts about the prevailing west–east headwinds, which could push the aircraft beyond their maximum range. Wing Commander Grant Lindeman, the CO of 455 Squadron, called the flight "suicidal". On 1 October, Soviet authorities made a formal request for the Hampdens. The RAF agreed to donate the Hampdens and PR Spitfires to the VVS; S&SF personnel were to return to Britain by sea after helping to convert the Soviet air- and ground-crews to both types. In Operation EZ, about 245 RAAF and RAF personnel returned to Britain on 28 October in the cruiser HMS Argonaut and the destroyers HMS Intrepid and Obdurate, another 416 men were carried on the ships the hospital unit rejected by the Russians, merchant sailors from Convoy PQ 17 and 18. All but one of the Catalinas was flown back to Britain, once Convoy QP 14 had passed through the danger zone.

=== Aircraft losses ===
Handley-Page Hampden TB 1 (4–5 September 1942)

144 Squadron RAF (squadron code prefix "PL")

- AE310 squadron code unknown, pilot unknown: fuel shortage over Afrikanda led to a forced landing, the crew was unhurt but the aircraft was damaged. (AE310 or P5323 was repaired and returned to service.)
- AE436 "PL-J", Pilot Officer (P/O) D. I. Evans: icing affected the Hampden, an engine overheated and it crashed on the Tsatsa massif near Kvikkjokk in Sweden, 15 mi (24 km) north of track. Evans and his supernumerary survived and walked for three days to Kvikkvok 20 mi (32 km) away. At risk of internment for violating Swedish neutrality, they claimed to have crashed in Norway and were later repatriated to the UK.
- AE356 "PL-?", Sergeant Walter Hood: shot down accidentally by fighters of the VVS into a lake near Murmansk, ventral gunner died of wounds and/or drowning.
- AT138 "PL-C", Sergeant John Bray: attacked by a fighter belonging to Jagdgeschwader 5 (JG 5) over Finland; three crew and one passenger were killed; Bray bailed out and became a prisoner of war. AT138 crashed near Alakurtti.
- P1273 "PL-Q", Sergeant Harry Bertrand: attacked by fighters from JG 5 over Finland; the crew and their passenger bailed out and became Prisoners of war. PL-Q crashed in a swamp near Petsamo (later known as Pechenga).
- P1344 "PL-K", P/O E. H. E. Perry: damaged by flak, as it passed directly over Petsamo airfield and subsequently attacked by two Messerschmitt Bf 109s of JG 5. During a crash-landing in an Axis-held part of the Kola Peninsula, three crewmembers were killed and Perry was seriously injured. He and his passenger were taken prisoner.

455 Squadron RAAF (squadron code prefix "UB")

- AT109 "UB-C", Squadron Leader James Catanach: strayed north of track, flak damage from submarine chaser UJ 1105 off the coast of Norway led to a forced landing on a beach at Molvika, near Kiberg and the crew being taken prisoner.
- P5304 "UB-H", Sergeant E. J. "Sandy" Smart: shot down over Sweden near Arvestuottar lake, north of Arjeplog, by a German fighter from Bodø; no survivors.
- P5323 "UB-L", P/O Rupert "Jeep" Patrick: ran out of fuel, made a wheels-up landing in an area of cut-down silver birch at Kandalaksha, Russia without casualties; the aircraft was damaged. (Either P5323 or AE310 was repaired and returned to service.)

Supermarine Spitfire PR Mk IV(D) (9–27 September 1942)

1 PRU RAF (squadron code prefix "LY")

- Build number and squadron code unknown, damaged on the ground during a German air raid at Vayenga (9 September 1942) and written off.
- BP889, squadron code unknown, Flying Officer (F/O) Gavin Walker: shot down on a sortie to Altafiord and crashed on the shores of Lakselv, Norway, late on the morning of 27 September, killing Walker. Some sources suggest that BP889 was hit by ground fire near Alta airfield on the outward leg. Luftwaffe records suggest that Walker was shot down by Gefreiter Kurt Dobner (11./JG 5, Banak airfield), flying a Focke-Wulf Fw 190 fighter.

== Bibliography ==
=== Books ===
- Alexander, Kristin (2009). Jack Davenport, Beaufighter Leader (e-book ed.). Sydney: Allen & Unwin. ISBN 978-1-282-23908-1.
- Bekker, Cajus (1966). The Luftwaffe War Diaries. New York: Ballantine. OCLC 657996667.
- Budiansky, S. (2000). Battle of Wits: The Complete Story of Codebreaking in World War II. New York: The Free Press (Simon & Schuster). ISBN 0-684-85932-7 – via Archive Foundation.
- Edgerton, D. (2011). Britain's War Machine: Weapons, Resources and Experts in the Second World War. London: Allen Lane. ISBN 978-0-7139-9918-1.
- Forsgren, Jan (2017). Sinking the Beast: The RAF 1944 Lancaster Raids Against Tirpitz. Oxford: Fonthill Media. ISBN 978-1-78155-318-3.
- Gordon, Ian (1995). Strike and Strike Again: 455 Squadron RAAF, 1944–45. Belconnen, ACT: Banner Books. ISBN 978-1-875593-09-5.
- Greenhous, B.; et al. (1994). The Official History of the Royal Canadian Air Force: The Crucible of War, 1939–1945. Vol. III. Toronto: University of Toronto Press and Department of National Defence. ISBN 978-0-8020-0574-8. D2-63/3-1994E.
- Herington, John (1954). "Chapter 11, The Air War at Sea: January to September 1942". Air War Against Germany and Italy, 1939–1943. Australia in the War of 1939–1945 Series 3 – Air. Vol. III (1st [online] ed.). Canberra: Australian War Memorial. pp. 262–297. OCLC 493504443.
- Hinsley, F. H. (1994) [1993]. British Intelligence in the Second World War: Its Influence on Strategy and Operations. History of the Second World War (2nd rev. abr. ed.). London: HMSO. ISBN 978-0-11-630961-7.
- Kahn, D. (1973) [1967]. The Codebreakers: The Story of Secret Writing (10th abr. Signet, Chicago ed.). New York: Macmillan. LCCN 63-16109. OCLC 78083316.
- Lawson, J. H. W. (1951). Four Five Five: The story of 455 (R.A.A.F.) Squadron. Melbourne, Aus: Wilke. OCLC 19796160.
- Macksey, Kenneth (2004) [2003]. The Searchers: Radio Intercept in two World Wars (Cassell Military Paperbacks ed.). London: Cassell. ISBN 978-0-304-36651-4.
- Mann, C. (2012). British Policy and Strategy towards Norway, 1941–45. Studies in Military and Strategic History. Basingstoke: Palgrave Macmillan. ISBN 978-0-230-21022-6.
- Richards, Denis; Saunders, H. St G. (1975) [1954]. Royal Air Force 1939–1945: The Fight Avails. History of the Second World War, Military Series. Vol. II (pbk. ed.). London: HMSO. ISBN 978-0-11-771593-6.
- Roskill, S. W. (1957) [1954]. Butler, J. R. M. (ed.). The War at Sea 1939–1945: The Defensive. History of the Second World War United Kingdom Military Series. Vol. I (4th impr. ed.). London: HMSO. OCLC 881709135.
- Roskill, S. W. (1962) [1956]. The Period of Balance. History of the Second World War: The War at Sea 1939–1945. Vol. II (3rd impression ed.). London: HMSO. OCLC 174453986.
- Schofield, Ernest; Nesbit, Roy Conyers (1987). Arctic Airmen: The RAF in Spitsbergen and North Russia 1942. London: W. Kimber. ISBN 978-0-7183-0660-1.
- Schofield, Ernest; Nesbit, Roy Conyers (2005) [1987]. Arctic Airmen: The RAF in Spitsbergen and North Russia 1942 (2nd repr. Spellmount, Staplehurst ed.). London: W. Kimber. ISBN 978-1-86227-291-0.
- Smith, Peter (1975). Convoy PQ 18: Arctic Victory. London: Kimber. ISBN 978-0-7183-0074-6.
- Smith, William (2023). Allied Convoys to Northern Russia 1941–1945 Politics, Strategy and Tactics. Barnsley: Pen & Sword Maritime. ISBN 978-1-39905-473-7.
- The Rise and Fall of the German Air Force (facs. repr. Public Record Office War Histories ed.). Richmond, Surrey: Air Ministry. 2001 [1948]. ISBN 978-1-903365-30-4. Air 41/10 number 248.
- Walling, M. G. (2012). Forgotten Sacrifice: The Arctic Convoys of World War II. General Military. Oxford: Osprey. ISBN 978-1-84908-718-6.
- Weal, John (2016). Arctic Bf 109 and Bf 110 Aces. Oxford: Osprey. ISBN 978-1-7820-0799-9.
- Wood, Tony; Gunston, Bill (1990). Hitler's Luftwaffe. New York: Crescent Books. OCLC 704898536.
- Woodman, Richard (2004) [1994]. Arctic Convoys 1941–1945. London: John Murray. ISBN 978-0-7195-5752-1.

=== Websites ===
- "Birth of Radio Intelligence in Finland and its Developer Reino Hallamaa". Pohjois–Kymenlaakson Asehistoriallinen Yhdistys Ry (North-Karelia Historical Association Ry) (in Finnish). 1996.
- Löwenstein, Magnus (2012). Hermansson, Bengt (ed.). "5 September 1942: Handley-Page HP52 Hampden TB.1, Serial AE436". Forced Landing Collection. Archived from the original on 12 August 2016.
- "Socks: Pilot Officer A W Bowman, 455 Squadron, RAAF". Australian War Memorial. 2025.
- Sorenson, Kjell (2011). "Handley Page HP52 Hampden Tsatsa, Sarek Sweden". flyvrak© World War II Aircraft Wreck Sites in Norway & Other Countries. Archived from the original on 18 January 2019.
- "Student helps Restore Great Grandfather's Hampden Bomber". Royal Air Force Museum. 2016. Archived from the original on 17 June 2018.
- "War: Second World War Sweden: 4 September 1942 to 5 September 1942". Commonwealth War Graves Commission. 2018.
