= National Steel Car =

Canadian rolling stock manufacturer

- Type: Subsidiary
- Industry: Rail transport
- Founded: 1912; 114 years ago
- Headquarters: 600 Kenilworth Avenue North, Hamilton, Ontario, Canada
- Area served: Canada and the United States
- Products: Freight rail cars (currently); Locomotives (formerly); Passenger railroad cars (formerly); Trams (formerly); Trucks (formerly); Aircraft (1939-1942; became Victory Aircraft)
- Parent: National Industries Inc
- Website: https://www.steelcar.com/

National Steel Car Limited is the largest manufacturer of railway rolling stock in Canada, based in Hamilton, Ontario. The company was founded in 1912, and has been a top 3 rolling stock manufacturer in Canada for its lifetime. National Steel Car is a subsidiary of National Industries Inc. and is currently led by Greg Aziz, chairman and CEO of National Steel Car.

== History ==
Founded in 1912 by several investors led by Sir John Morison Gibson and with interests related to the Magor Car Corporation, Basil Magor was enlisted to lead the National Steel Car project. Once the new plant was functioning in Hamilton, Ontario, Magor became General Manager of National Steel Car Company Limited. The first few years of National Steel Car's production surpassed the expectations of its investors. The company began manufacturing just as Canadian rolling stock orders reached an all-time high in 1913. Due to this, National Steel Car began business with a large number of box car orders from Canadian Pacific Railway, and various railcar orders from Canadian Northern Railway. In 1919, Donald Symington of Baltimore and Robert Magor of Magor Car made an offer on the company, and from there on it was reorganized as National Steel Car Corporation Limited.

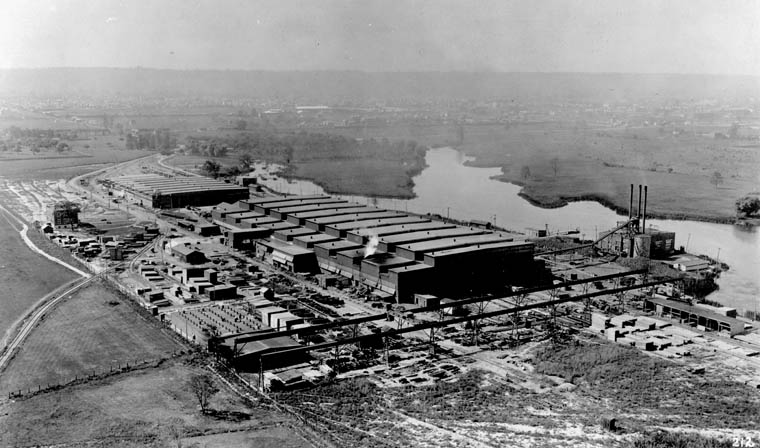
View of the plant in Hamilton.

Business at National Steel Car boomed from the beginning of its life until just before the Great Depression of the 1930s. During the depression, National Steel Car fell behind in terms of diversity in comparison to its competitors, and suffered a severe lack of orders. At one point the company resorted to producing motor trucks, bus bodies, and outboard motor boats, just so they had orders to fill. World War II renewed National Steel Car's business, and the company has been in a relatively healthy state for most of its life since. It shares nearly all Canadian rolling stock orders with Eastern Car Company. National Steel Car also exports to the United States regularly, more so in the later years of its life.

In 1962, Dofasco bought National Steel Car, but by 1990 it had effectively given up control of the declining company, and in 1994 they sold it to Hamilton corporation National Industries Inc., owned by Greg Aziz. By the year 2000, Aziz had increased National Steel Car's workforce from 500 to 3,000 employees and its production capacity from 3,500 to 12,500 rail cars annually. Today, National Steel Car makes and supplies various rolling stock to Canadian and American customers, mainly railway operators and commercial rail operators.

Originally named Imperial Steel Car, the name was changed before the end of 1912.

Today National Steel Car is one of a few remaining rolling stock companies left in Canada.

== Products ==
The following are past and present products made by National Steel Car.

=== Current ===
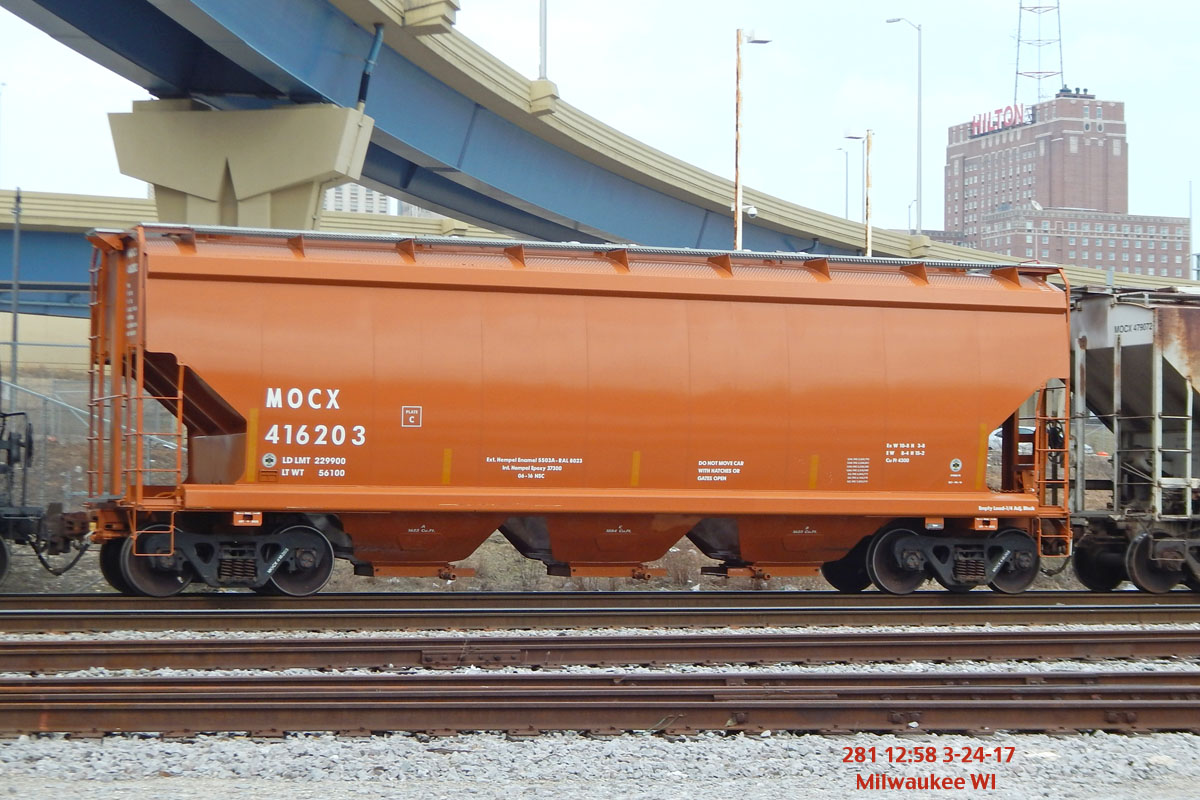
Modern hopper car built in 2016

National Steel Car has focused on freight car production since the 1960s and was the second largest car builder in 1950s.

- Boxcar - super duty and jumbo
- Coil car - Longitudinal and transverse coil cars
- Flat car - including Centre beam cars
- Gondola car - including coal car
- Hopper car - covered and open top
- Intermodal car - spine and well (single and multiple pack)
- Tank car - General purpose, insulated and non-insulated cars.

=== Past ===
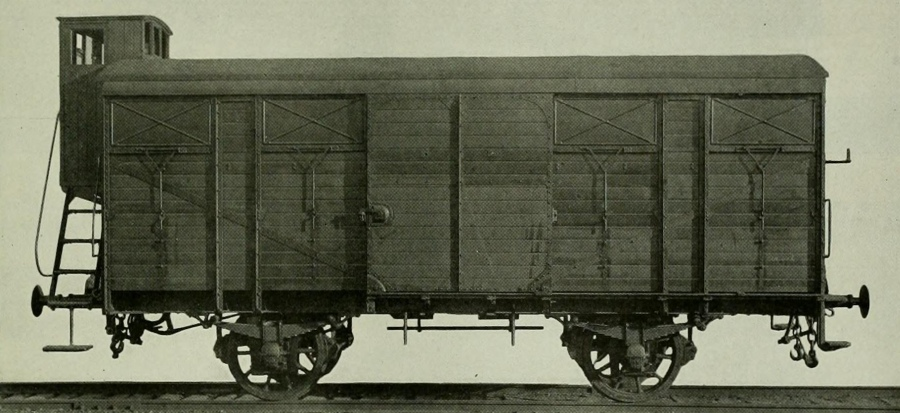
French freight car, 1917

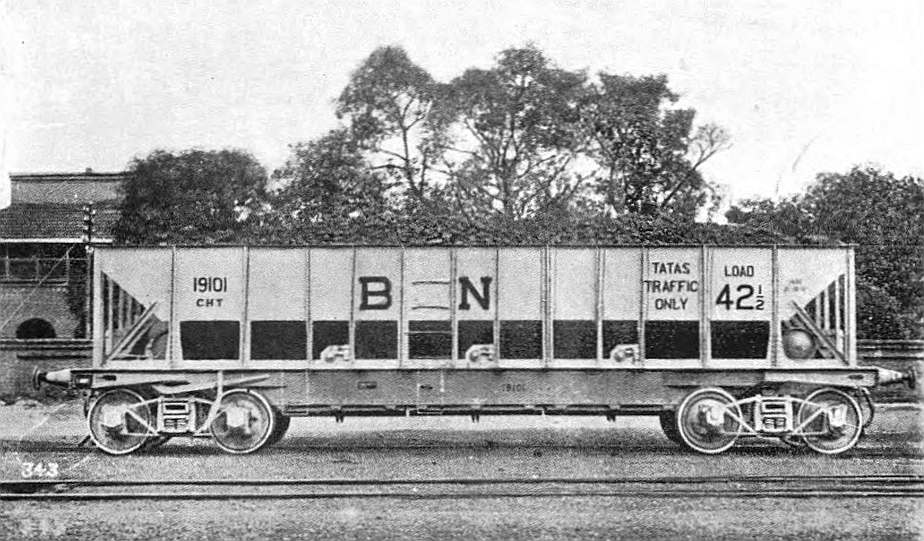
Indian bogie coal hopper car, 1919

National Steel Car has manufactured various railcar and non-rail products.

- 5300 freight cars for the French Northern Railway and Paris, Lyon and Mediterranean Railway, 1915-1920
- steel coal hopper cars for the indian Bengal Nagpur Railway in 1919
- 50 ton electric locomotives - for Inco 1919
- snowplow car - 1950s
- Baggage car - including 73'-6" baggage-express car
- Log stake car
  - Lo-Railer workcar for Edmonton Transit System
- Passenger car
  - River passenger cars for Canadian Pacific Railway 1929
  - Business cars for Canadian National Railways 1954; transferred to Via Rail
- trucks - National Truck Company founded 1919
- steel bodies and chassis for cars, bus and streetcars 1926
  - SE-DT streetcars for Hamilton Street Railway 1920s
- aircraft production in Malton, Ontario began in 1939 - sold to the Government of Canada in 1942 (renamed Victory Aircraft Company and became Avro Canada in 1945)

Up until 1950 National Steel Car made wood and steel railcars. In 1945 it acquired Valdes Lumber Company of British Columbia to supply wood for their railcar products.

Aircraft

In 1939 an aircraft division was set up to produce aircraft and aircraft components. The Malton plant produced Westland Lysander aircraft under licence and was a subcontractor for the manufacture of Hawker Hurricane fighters (for Canadian Car and Foundry), Avro Anson trainers (Canadian Federal Aircraft Ltd.) and Handley Page Hampden bombers (as part of Canadian Associated Aircraft consortium). In September 1941 it received a contract to build the Avro Lancaster four-engined bomber. The aircraft plant was taken over by the government and set up as Victory Aircraft in November 1942.

== Clients ==
Prior to 1995 National Steel Car's focus was within Canada, but since the 1990s it has focused elsewhere in North America, namely the United States.

- Canadian National
- Canadian Pacific
- Ontario Northland Railway
- BNSF
- Dow Chemicals
- Waste Management
- Shell Canada
- CSX
- Norfolk Southern
- Babcock & Brown
- Union Pacific
- Agrium
- Nova Chemicals
- Lafarge
- Quebec Iron Ore

== See also ==
National Steel Car is one of a few rail vehicle manufacturers left in Canada:

- Bombardier Transportation (founded 1974 and based on Montreal with operations in Ontario and Quebec)
- Railpower Technologies (founded 2001 and based in Brossard)
