= Canadian Associated Aircraft =

- Industry: Aerospace
- Founded: 1938
- Defunct: 1942
- Fate: Disbanded after orders delivered
- Successor: Victory Aircraft; Avro Canada
- Headquarters: Canada
- Products: Military aircraft

Canadian Associated Aircraft was a joint Canadian-United Kingdom project to build Handley Page Hampden aircraft in the late 1930s.

== History ==
During the build-up to the Second World War, Fairchild Aircraft Ltd. had joined together with five other aviation companies in setting up Canadian Associated Aircraft Ltd. The consortium was formed in 1938 to build the Handley Page Hampden for use in the Royal Air Force with Fairchild mainly contracted to build the Hampden's empennage. Of 1,430 Hampdens manufactured, 160 were built in Canada by the "Canadian Associated Aircraft" consortium of three Ontario (Fleet Aircraft, National Steel Car, Ottawa Car and Aircraft) and three Quebec (Canadian Car and Foundry, Fairchild, Canadian Vickers) aircraft companies as a so-called "educational project" to build up the Canadian aircraft industry and provide the expertise for building the four-engined Short Stirling bomber (ultimately the Stirling project was dropped and the Avro Lancaster was substituted).

== Production ==
The Hampden was the only aircraft the consortium produced. They were built at Malton Airport near Toronto and at St. Hubert Airport near Montreal.

Of the 160 Hampdens built, 84 were shipped by sea to Britain, while the remainder came to Royal Air Force station Patricia Bay (now Victoria Airport), British Columbia to set up No.32 Operational Training Unit (RAF). Due to heavy attrition from accidents, a number of "war weary" Hampdens were later flown from the UK to Patricia Bay as replacements.

== Surviving aircraft ==
Hampden Mk I P5436 was one of the Canadian-built Hampdens. It completed only 100 hours of flying time before crashing near Patricia Bay, on 15 November 1942, while engaged in torpedo dropping practice. In the 1980s, the Canadian Museum of Flight salvaged the remains of Hampden AN136 from Mt. Tuam on Saltspring Island and, later, N132 from a mountaintop near Ucluelet, British Columbia. Together with the salvage of P5436 in 1985, a lengthy reconstruction project was culminated in the unveiling of the composite P5436 Hampden now on display in the museum.

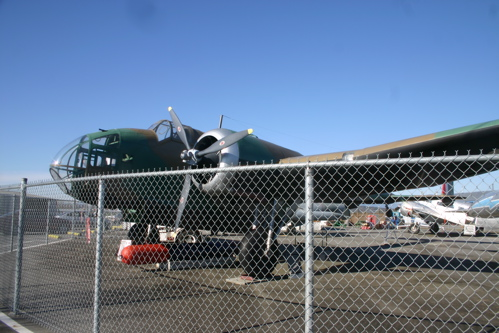
Hampden restoration project at the Canadian Museum of Flight at Langley, British Columbia c.2006

== Facilities ==
Two facilities that built CAA aircraft:

- Saint Hubert Airport, Saint Hubert, Quebec - taken over by RCAF as RCAF Station St. Hubert beginning in 1941
- Malton, Ontario – National Steel Car, later taken over by government to form Victory Aircraft in 1942
