= Frank Hopps =

Royal Air Force Air Vice-Marshal (1894–1976)

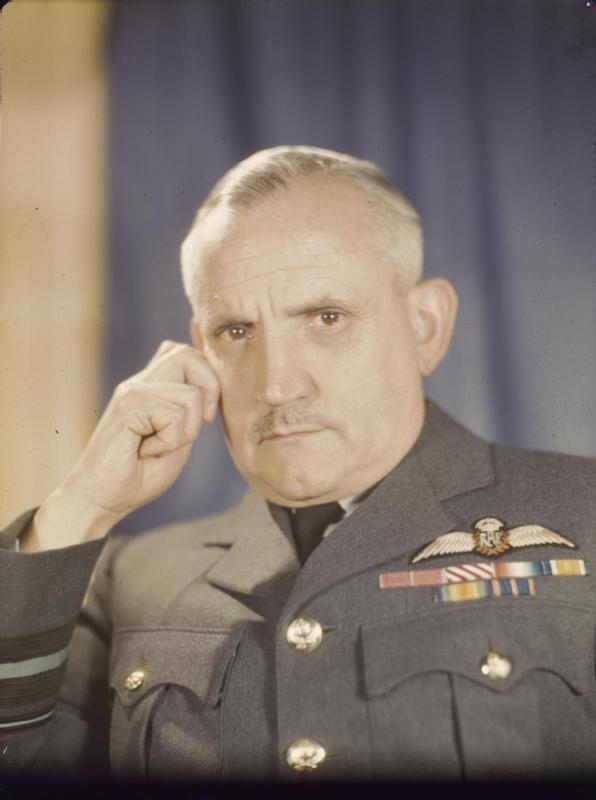
- Air Vice Marshal Frank Hopps while serving with British Air Forces of Occupation, Germany, in 1945
- Born: 3 December 1894; Hackney, London
- Died: 10 October 1976 (aged 81); Brighton, Sussex
- Military career
- Allegiance: United Kingdom
- Branch: British Army (1916–1918); Royal Air Force (1918–1950)
- Service years: 1916–1950
- Rank: Air Vice Marshal
- Commands: No. 19 Group (1947–1950); No. 16 (Reconnaissance) Group (1943–1945); No. 115 Squadron (1937–1938)
- Conflicts: First World War; Second World War
- Awards: Companion of the Order of the Bath; Commander of the Order of the British Empire; Air Force Cross; Mentioned in Despatches; Order of Kutuzov, 3rd Class (USSR)

Air Vice Marshal Frank Linden Hopps, CB, CBE, AFC (3 December 1894 – 10 October 1976) was a senior officer of the Royal Air Force (RAF).

During the First World War, Hopps was commissioned as a second lieutenant in the 5th Battalion, King's Own Yorkshire Light Infantry, but later transferred to the Royal Flying Corps (RFC). After training as a pilot, Hopps was posted in August 1917 to a scout (fighter) squadron on the Western Front, No. 20 Squadron RFC. (The RAF was formed from a merger of the RFC and Royal Naval Air Service on 1 April 1918.)

Hopps remained in the RAF following the end of the war. In 1929, he graduated from the RAF College, Cranwell.

After the beginning of the Second World War, Hopps (with the rank of temporary group captain) served as station commander at RAF Eastchurch during the Battle of Britain.

During late 1942, he was posted to North-West Russia as commanding officer of the Search & Strike Force, an expeditionary wing stationed in the Soviet Union, under the code name Operation Orator, to protect the Arctic convoy PQ 18. As a result of the operation's success, Hopps received the Orden Kutuzova (Order of Kutuzov) 3rd Class (OK3) – a Soviet military decoration awarded to senior officers for the skilful avoidance of attacks and/or leading successful counterattacks.

In 1943–45, Hopps commanded No. 16 Group, which performed reconnaissance duties for RAF Coastal Command. Following the end of the war, Hopps was appointed Air Officer in Charge of Administration (AOA) at the British Air Forces of Occupation in Germany. In 1947 he was appointed commander of No. 19 Group, a Coastal Command unit which included reconnaissance and strike squadrons.

Hopps retired from the RAF, with the substantive rank of air vice marshal on 24 March 1950.

Between 1953 and 1968, he was chief executive of the Agricultural Engineers Association (UK).

== Bibliography ==
- Lieutenant Frank Linden HOPPS. The King's Own (Yorkshire Light Infantry) (Officer's personal file; War Office), Public Records Office (ref. WO 374/34673)
- Who Was Who: 1897–2000, New York, St. Martin's Press, 2002, p. 403
- Battle of Britain Historical Society, 2007, "Tuesday August 13th 1940 Adler Tag (Eagle Day) Begins"
- FamilySearch, 2014, "Frank Linden Hopps, 1976", England and Wales Death Registration Index 1837–2007.
- Air of Authority – A History of RAF Organisation, 2018, "Air Vice Marshal F L Hopps (07160)"
