= Handley Page Hampden =

British twin-engine medium bomber

HP.52 Hampden
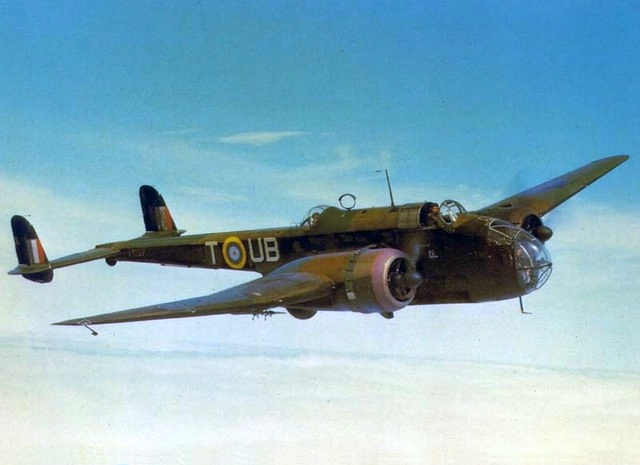
- Hampden Mk.I of No. 455 Squadron RAAF (May 1942)

General information
- Type: Medium bomber
- Manufacturer: Handley Page (UK); Canadian Associated Aircraft (Canada)
- Designer: Gustav Lachmann
- Primary users: Royal Air Force Royal Canadian Air Force; Soviet Naval Aviation; Royal Australian Air Force
- Number built: 1,430

History
- Manufactured: 1936–1941
- Introduction date: 1938
- First flight: 21 June 1936
- Retired: 1943

The Handley Page HP.52 Hampden was a British twin-engine medium bomber that was operated by the Royal Air Force (RAF). It was part of the trio of large twin-engine bombers procured for the RAF, joining the Armstrong Whitworth Whitley and Vickers Wellington. The Hampden was powered by Bristol Pegasus radial engines but a variant known as the Handley Page Hereford had in-line Napier Daggers.

The Hampden served in the early stages of the Second World War, bearing the brunt of the early bombing war over Europe, taking part in the first night raid on Berlin and the first 1,000-bomber raid on Cologne. When it became obsolete, after a period of mainly operating at night, it was retired from RAF Bomber Command service in late 1942. By 1943, the rest of the trio were being superseded by the larger four-engined heavy bombers such as the Avro Lancaster.

== Development ==
=== Origins ===
In 1932, the Air Ministry issued Specification B.9/32 seeking a twin-engined day bomber with higher performance than any preceding bomber aircraft. Handley Page and Vickers both designed aircraft to meet this specification, the Vickers design became the Wellington. The Handley Page design team, led by George Volkert, drafted a radical aircraft, initially centering upon the politically favoured Rolls-Royce Goshawk engine. By mid-1934 development of the Goshawk looked less promising and the Air Ministry relaxed the tare weight (unloaded weight) requirement of the specification, allowing for the use of heavier and more powerful radial engines such as the Bristol Perseus and Bristol Pegasus. According to aviation author Philip J.R. Moyes, the Handley Page design soon found support with the Air Ministry in part because it was judged to represent a fair compromise between range, payload, and speed.

During early 1936, the first prototype, designated as the HP.52 and given the serial number K4240, was completed. On seeing the narrow-yet-deep fuselage, which was only 3 ft wide, C. G. Grey, founder of The Aeroplane magazine, remarked "it looks like a flying suitcase", a nickname that stuck with the aircraft for its lifetime. On 21 June 1936, the prototype, powered by a pair of Bristol Pegasus P.E.5S(A) engines, conducted its maiden flight from Radlett Aerodrome, Hertfordshire, piloted by Handley-Page chief test pilot Major James Cordes. In late June 1936, the prototype was put on public display in the New Types Park, Hendon Air Show, London. In August 1936, in response to the successful flight trials performed by K4240, the Air Ministry issued an initial production order for the type, ordering 180 production aircraft to be manufactured to meet Specification B.30/36; concurrently, a second order for 100 aircraft powered by the Napier Dagger was issued to Belfast-based Short & Harland.

In early 1937, a second prototype, which received the serial number L7271, was completed; this second prototype had several differences from the first, including the pitot tube being repositioned below the fuselage, a more rounded ventral defensive gun position, and a slightly modified nose. L7271 later received a pair of Dagger engines and was accordingly re-designated as the HP.53; on 1 July 1937, it performed its first flight with the new engines. Another prototype, L4032, was produced to serve as the production-standard prototype; on 24 June 1938, the third prototype conducted its maiden flight. L4032 differed from the previous two prototypes in that it was powered by a pair of Pegasus XVIII engines, the nose incorporated an optically flat bomb-aiming panel, as well as the ventral and dorsal gun positions being revised.

On 24 June 1938, L4032 was officially christened by Lady Katharine Mary Montagu-Douglas-Scott, Viscountess Hampden, at a ceremony held in Radlett Aerodrome, the same day on which its first flight took place. Viscountess Hampden's speech invoked "the spirit of John Hampden, the defender of civil liberties" to inspire future crews of his namesake aircraft. L4032 and L4033, which was the second production-standard Hampden to be produced, would be later assigned to the Aeroplane and Armament Experimental Establishment at RAF Martlesham Heath, Suffolk. On 20 September 1938, the third production Hampden, designated L4034, following the completion of handling trials conducted by the Central Flying School at Upavon Aerodrome, Wiltshire, become the first aircraft to enter RAF squadron service, being delivered to No. 49 Squadron.

=== Production ===
By late 1938, the mass manufacturing plans for the Hampden had been formalised. Volker devised a photographic method for reproducing the plans at full size for distribution to other factories. In addition to Handley-Page's own production line, the type was to be built under subcontract by English Electric at its factory in Preston, Lancashire. On 6 August 1938, English Electric was awarded an initial contract to manufacture 75 Hampdens. In addition, Canadian interest in domestic production of the type had resulted in the establishment of the joint Anglo-Canadian Canadian Associated Aircraft company, which promptly received an initial order from the RAF for 80 Hampdens to be completed in Canada; this facility would effectively act as a shadow factory during wartime. On 1 September 1938, in response to interest expressed by the Royal Swedish Air Force (RSAF) in the Hampden, including in a potential licence production arrangement for 70 aircraft to be built in Sweden, a single production Hampden was supplied to Sweden. Designated P.5 by the RSAF, it was operated by the service until November 1945, after which it was sold to Svenska Aeroplan AB (SAAB) to serve as a flying testbed before being retired in late 1947.

On 22 February 1940, the first Preston-built Hampden, P2062, conducted its maiden flight. English Electric would go on to manufacture a total of 770 Hampdens, more than any other company, before delivering its final aircraft on 15 March 1942. In July 1940, Handley-Page terminated its own production line for the Hampden upon the completion of its 500th aircraft. On 9 August 1940, the first Canadian-built Hampden, P5298, made its debut flight; by October 1940, Canadian production had risen to 15 aircraft per month. A total of 160 Hampdens were completed by Canadian Associated Aircraft, many of which were ferried to the United Kingdom for wartime service. The final Canadian-built aircraft was delivered in late 1941.

== Design ==
The Hampden Mk I had a pilot, navigator/bomb aimer, radio operator and rear gunner. Conceived as a fast, manoeuvrable "fighting bomber", the Hampden had a fixed forward-firing .303 in (7.7 mm) Browning machine gun in the upper part of the fuselage nose. To avoid the weight penalties of powered turrets, the Hampden had a curved Perspex nose fitted with a manual .303 in (7.7 mm) Vickers K machine gun and a .303 in (7.7 mm) Vickers K installation in the rear upper and lower positions. The layout was similar to the all-guns-forward cockpits introduced about the same time in Luftwaffe medium bombers, notably the Dornier Do 17. During the Norwegian Campaign, these guns proved to be thoroughly inadequate for self-defence in daylight; the single guns were replaced by twin Vickers K guns, a process led by Air Vice Marshal Arthur Harris of No. 5 Group RAF in 1940.

The Hampden had a flush-rivetted stressed skin, reinforced with a mixture of bent and extruded sections in an all-metal monocoque design. A split-assembly construction technique was employed: sections were prefabricated and then joined, to enable rapid and economic manufacture. The fuselage was in three big sections – front, centre and rear – that were built using jigs. The centre and rear sections were made of two halves, which meant that the sections could be fitted out in part under better working conditions prior to assembly. All possible assembly work was performed at the benches prior to installation upon each aircraft.

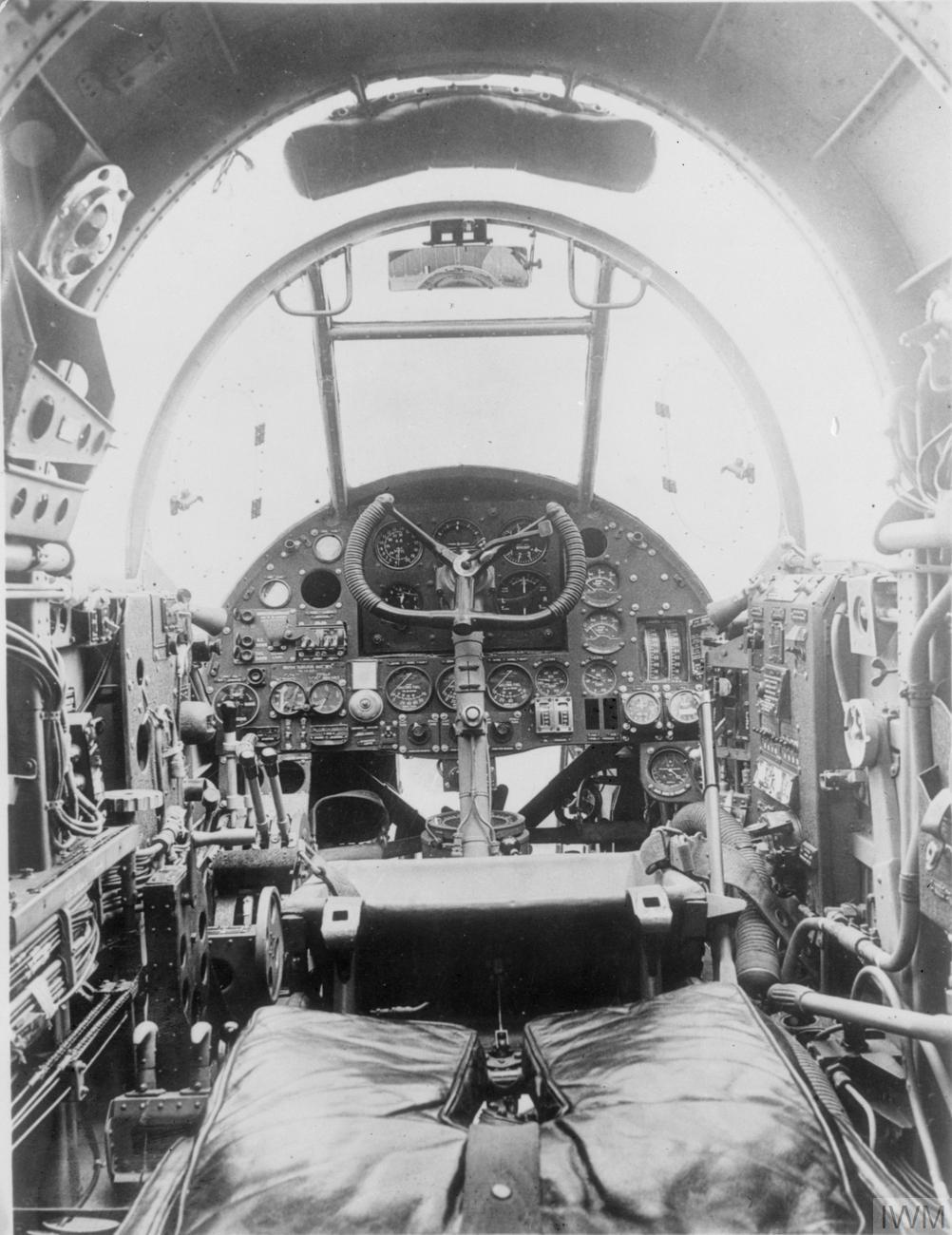
Hampden cockpit

The wings were made up of three large units: centre section, port outer wing and starboard outer wing, which were also subdivided. Each section was built around a main girder spar, leading edge section and trailing edge section. The wing made use of wingtip slots and hydraulically actuated trailing edge flaps; the flaps and ailerons had stress-bearing D-spars. According to Moyes, the configuration of the wing was a key feature of Hampden, being highly tapered and designed to exert low levels of drag; these attributes were responsible for the aircraft's high top speed for the era of 265 mph (230 kn; 426 km/h) while retaining a reasonably low landing speed of 73 mph (63 kn; 117 km/h).

The Hampden's flying qualities were typically described as being favourable; Moyes described it as being "extraordinarily mobile on the controls". Pilots were provided with a high level of external visibility, assisting the execution of steep turns and other manoeuvres. The control layout required some familiarisation, as some elements such as the hydraulic controls were unobtrusive and unintuitive. Upon introduction, the Hampden exhibited greater speeds and initial climb rates than any of its contemporaries while still retaining favourable handling qualities.

The slim and compact fuselage of the aircraft was quite cramped, being wide enough only for a single person. The navigator sat behind the pilot and access in the cockpit required folding down the seats. Once in place, the crew had almost no room to move and were typically uncomfortable during long missions. Aircrews referred to the Hampden by various nicknames due to this, such as Flying Suitcase, Panhandle, and Flying Tadpole. Wilfred John Lewis wrote:

I did my first flight and first tour on Hampdens. A beautiful aeroplane to fly, terrible to fly in! Cramped, no heat, no facilities where you could relieve yourself. You got in there and you were stuck there. The aeroplane was like a fighter. It was only 3 feet wide on the outside of the fuselage and the pilot was a very busy person. There were 111 items for the pilot to take care of because on the original aircraft he had not only to find the instruments, the engine and all that, but also he had all the bomb switches to hold the bombs.

The newest of the three medium bombers, the Hampden was often referred to by aircrews as the "Flying Suitcase" because of its cramped crew conditions, or more plausibly, because of the unusually thin, deep, slab-sided and rectangular shape of the fuselage was reminiscent of that of a suitcase.

== Operational history ==
=== UK service ===
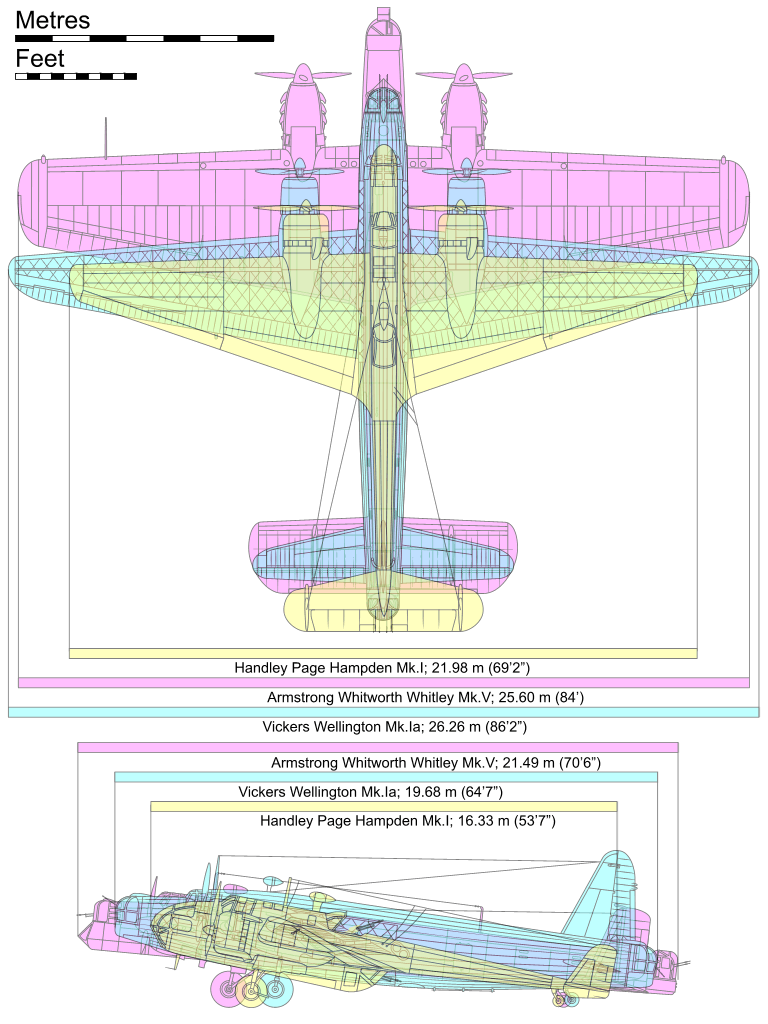
Scale comparison diagram of the trio of British twin-engined medium bombers at the outbreak of the Second World War; the Hampden (yellow), the Vickers Wellington (blue) and the Armstrong Whitworth Whitley (pink)

In September 1938, 49 Squadron received the first Hampdens; by the end of the year, 49 Squadron and 83 Squadron at RAF Scampton had re-equipped with the type. A total of 226 Hampdens were in service with ten squadrons by the start of the Second World War, with six forming the operational strength of 5 Group RAF Bomber Command based in Lincolnshire.

With the outbreak of war in 1939, Hampdens were used for armed aerial reconnaissance missions, observing German naval activity during daylight. Despite its speed and manoeuvrability, the Hampden proved to be no match for Luftwaffe fighters; in December 1939, Bomber Command is claimed to have discarded the belief that aircraft such as the Hampden could realistically operate by day and instead chose to predominantly employ them under the cover of darkness operations. During 1940, Hampdens of 5 Group conducted 123 night airborne leaflet propaganda missions, losing only one aircraft.

On 13 April 1940, days after the German invasion of Norway, a large number of Hampdens were dispatched on night mine-laying (code-named gardening) flights in the North Sea in areas deemed unapproachable by British shipping. According to Moyes, this activity proved highly effective, experiencing a low casualty rate of less than 1.9 aircraft per mission. The Hampden also saw a return to its use as a day bomber during the Norwegian Campaign but quickly proved to be under-gunned in the face of German fighters.

On 19 March 1940, Hampdens took part in the first deliberate bombing of German soil in a night raid upon the seaplane hangars and slipways in Hörnum, Sylt. The type continued to operate at night on bombing raids over Germany. Flight Lieutenant Rod Learoyd of 49 Squadron was awarded the Victoria Cross for a low-level attack on the Dortmund-Ems canal on 12 August 1940 where two of five aircraft failed to return. On 25 August 1940, Hampdens from various squadrons participated in the RAF's first bombing raid on Berlin. Sergeant John Hannah was the wireless operator/air gunner of an 83 Squadron Hampden and was awarded the Victoria Cross on 15 September 1940, when he fought the flames of the burning aircraft, allowing the pilot to return it to base.

In April 1942, the Hampden-equipped 144 Squadron and 455 Squadron RAAF were transferred from Bomber Command to Coastal Command to perform the torpedo bomber role. Later that year, detachments from both squadrons were dispatched to Vaenga airfield, Murmansk, Russia, to help safeguard the Arctic convoys in the vicinity. A total of four squadrons assigned to Coastal Command would be equipped with Hampdens. These squadrons continued to use the type into late 1943; the last Coastal Command squadron transitioned from the type on 10 December 1943.

Almost half of the Hampdens built, 714, were lost on operations, with 1,077 crew killed and 739 reported as missing. German Flak accounted for 108, one hit a German barrage balloon, 263 Hampdens crashed because of "a variety of causes" and 214 others were classed as "missing". Luftwaffe pilots claimed 128 Hampdens, shooting down 92 at night.

The last Bomber Command sorties by Hampdens were flown on the night of 14/15 September 1942 by 408 Squadron, RCAF against Wilhelmshaven. After being withdrawn from Bomber Command in 1942, it operated with RAF Coastal Command until 1943 as a long-range torpedo bomber (the Hampden TB Mk I with a Mk XII torpedo in an open bomb bay and a 500-pound (230 kg) bomb under each wing) and as a maritime reconnaissance aircraft.

=== Foreign service ===
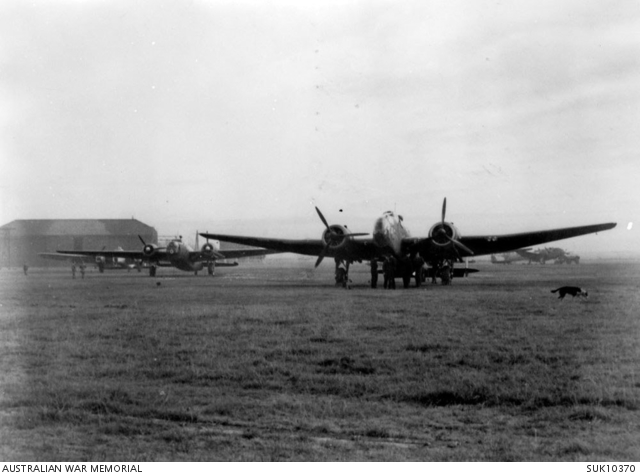
A RAAF Hampden of No. 455 Squadron at RAF Wigsley, Nottinghamshire, circa 1942

The Hampden was also used by the Royal Canadian Air Force (RCAF), Royal Australian Air Force (RAAF), Royal New Zealand Air Force (RNZAF), Aviatsiya Voenno-Morskogo Flota (AV-MF: Maritime Military Fleet Aviation) of the Soviet Union and the Swedish Flygvapnet (Air Force).

The Hampden in RCAF service included the 160 examples manufactured in Canada by the Canadian Associated Aircraft consortium. Of the total built, 84 were shipped by sea to Great Britain, while the remainder came to Patricia Bay (Victoria Airport) B.C., to set up No. 32 OTU (RAF) used for bombing and gunnery training. Typical exercises at 32 OTU consisted of patrolling up the West Coast of Vancouver Island at night or flying out into the Pacific to a navigational map co-ordinate, often in adverse and un-forecast inclement weather. Due to attrition from accidents, about 200 "war weary" Hampdens were later flown from the U.K. to Patricia Bay as replacements.

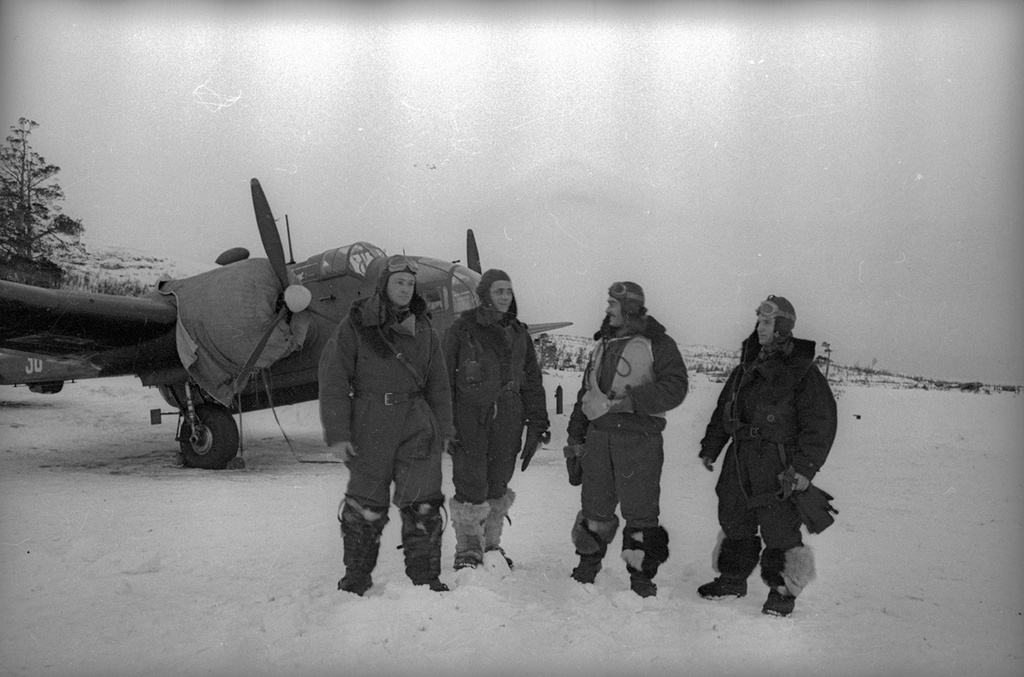
Aleksandr Zakharovich Stoyanov, commander of the 2nd Squadron, 24th Mine-Torpedo Aviation Regiment, with his crew by one of the Soviet Hampdens

In Operation Orator, during September 1942, the crews of 32 Hampden TB.1 torpedo bombers from 144 Squadron RAF and 455 Squadron RAAF flew to Northwest Russia, to protect arctic convoy PQ 18 from German surface vessels, such the battleship Tirpitz. The Hampden crews flew from Sumburgh in the Shetland Islands to Vaenga (Vayenga; later known as Severomorsk) in Murmansk Oblast, Russia. This was a hazardous route, often subject to poor weather and spanning more than 2,100 nautical miles (2,400 mi; 3,900 km), partly over enemy-occupied territory in Norway and Finland. Eight Hampdens were lost or damaged beyond repair en route. 144 and 455 Squadrons flew a small number of sorties from Vaenga. While it was originally intended that the Hampdens would be flown back to Scotland, the prevailing west–east headwinds on such a flight might have pushed the Hampdens beyond their maximum endurance and it was decided to transport the wing's personnel back to Britain by sea and gift the Hampdens to the Soviet Navy.

Aircrews and mechanics from Maritime Military Fleet Aviation (Aviatsiya Voenno-Morskogo Flota; VMF) were trained by members of 144 and 455 Squadrons, before their return to Britain in October. The 3rd Squadron, 24th Mine-Torpedo Aviation Regiment (24 Минно-торпедный авиаполк; 24 MTAP) operated the "balalaika" – the Russian nickname for the Hampden, in reference to its unusual shape – until mid-1943, when losses, a lack of replacements and a shortage of spares forced its retirement. 24 MTAP then reverted to the Ilyushin DB-3/Ilyushin Il-4.

In Sweden, the Flygvapnet assigned an HP.52 to Reconnaissance Wing F 11 at Nyköping for evaluation, under the designation P5. After the war, the aircraft was sold to SAAB where it was used as an avionics test bed.

== Variants ==
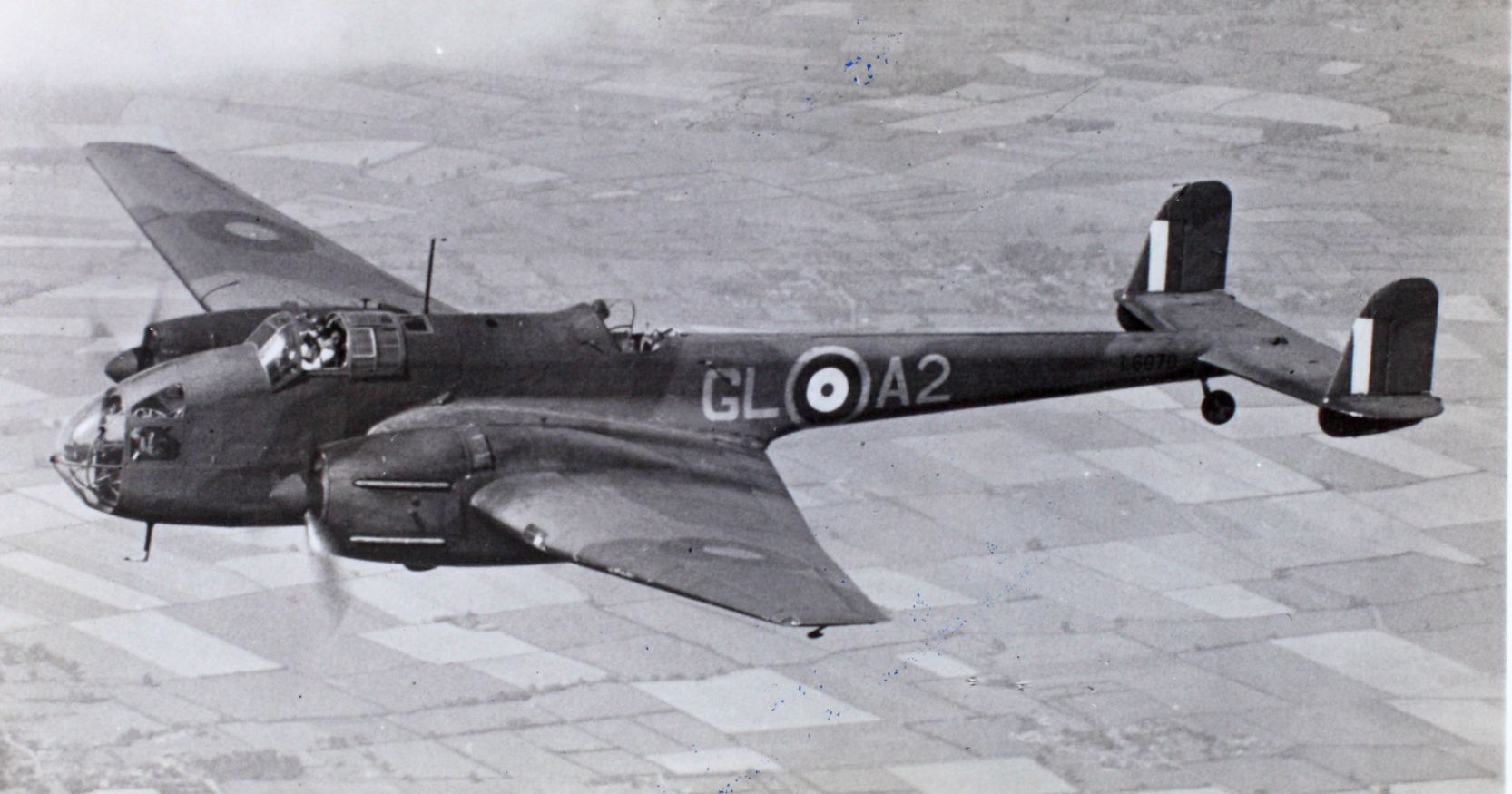
Hereford

The Hampden was powered by two 980 hp (730 kW) Bristol Pegasus XVIII nine-cylinder radial engines. A Mk II variant, designated the HP.62, was developed by converting two Hampdens to use the 1,000 hp (750 kW) Wright Cyclone engine in 1940, but no further work was done on that project.

Interest in the HP.52 by the Swedish Air Force led to the creation of the HP.53 prototype, which was subsequently used as a test bed for a pair of 1,000 hp (750 kW) Napier Dagger VIII 24-cylinder H-block air-cooled inline engines.

In August 1936, the Air Ministry placed an order for 100 Hampdens equipped with the Dagger engine. Those aircraft subsequently received the designation HP.53, along with the name Hereford. Manufactured by Short & Harland in Belfast, their performance was almost identical to that of their Hampden cousins, but there were problems with the engines. The Dagger engine proved to be noisy and unreliable. Cooling problems plagued the engine while being run on the ground, resulting in distortions and premature failures. The problems were not satisfactorily resolved, with the result that most of the Herefords on order were converted to Hampdens, while those that were constructed were often re-engined to become Hampdens. A limited number of Herefords did enter squadron service but were only used by training units.

== Operators ==
=== Hampden ===
Australia

- Royal Australian Air Force
  - No. 455 Squadron RAAF Used between July 1941 and December 1943, Code letters UB.

Canada

- Royal Canadian Air Force
  - No. 408 (Goose) Squadron RCAF Used with RAF Bomber Command between July 1941 and September 1942, Code letters EQ
  - No. 415 (Swordfish) Squadron RCAF Used as a torpedo bomber with RAF Coastal Command between February 1942 and November 1943, Code letters GX
  - No. 420 (Snowy Owl) Squadron RCAF Used with RAF Bomber Command between December 1941 and August 1942, Code letters PT
  - No. 32 Operational Training Unit RAF/RCAF Used in Canada between May 1942 and February 1944, Code letters DK, LB, OP and RO

New Zealand

- Royal New Zealand Air Force
  - No. 489 Squadron RNZAF Used between February 1942 and November 1943, Code letters XA

Soviet Union

- Soviet Naval Aviation
  - 24th Mine-Torpedo Aviation Regiment (24 MTAP)

Sweden

- Swedish Air Force
  - Reconnaissance Wing F 11 based at Nyköping operated a single HP.52 for evaluation under designation P 5. After the war, the aircraft was sold to SAAB where it was operated for testing avionics.

United Kingdom

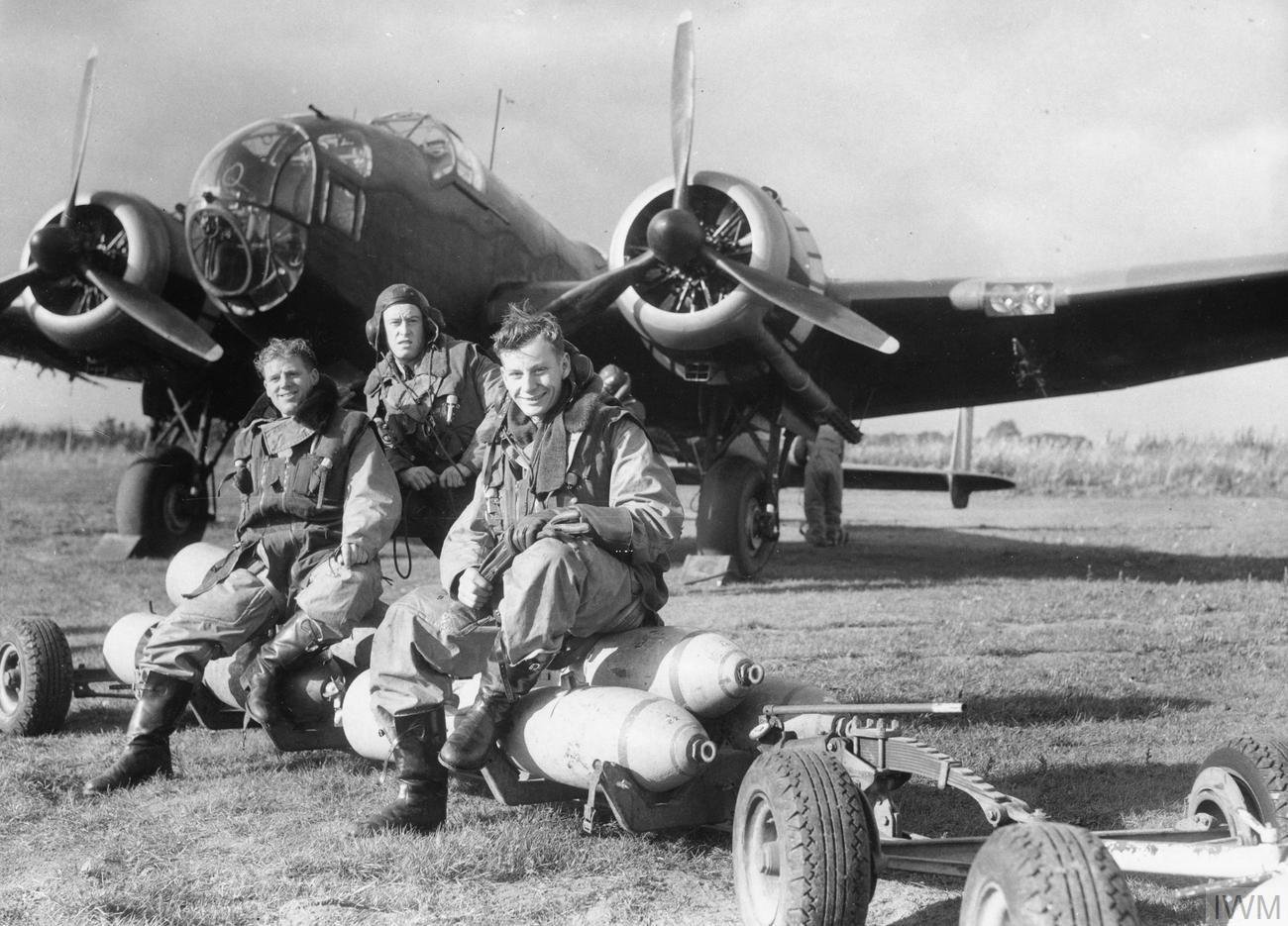
Handley Page Hampden of No. 83 Squadron with crew, seated on a loaded bomb trolley at Scampton, October 1940

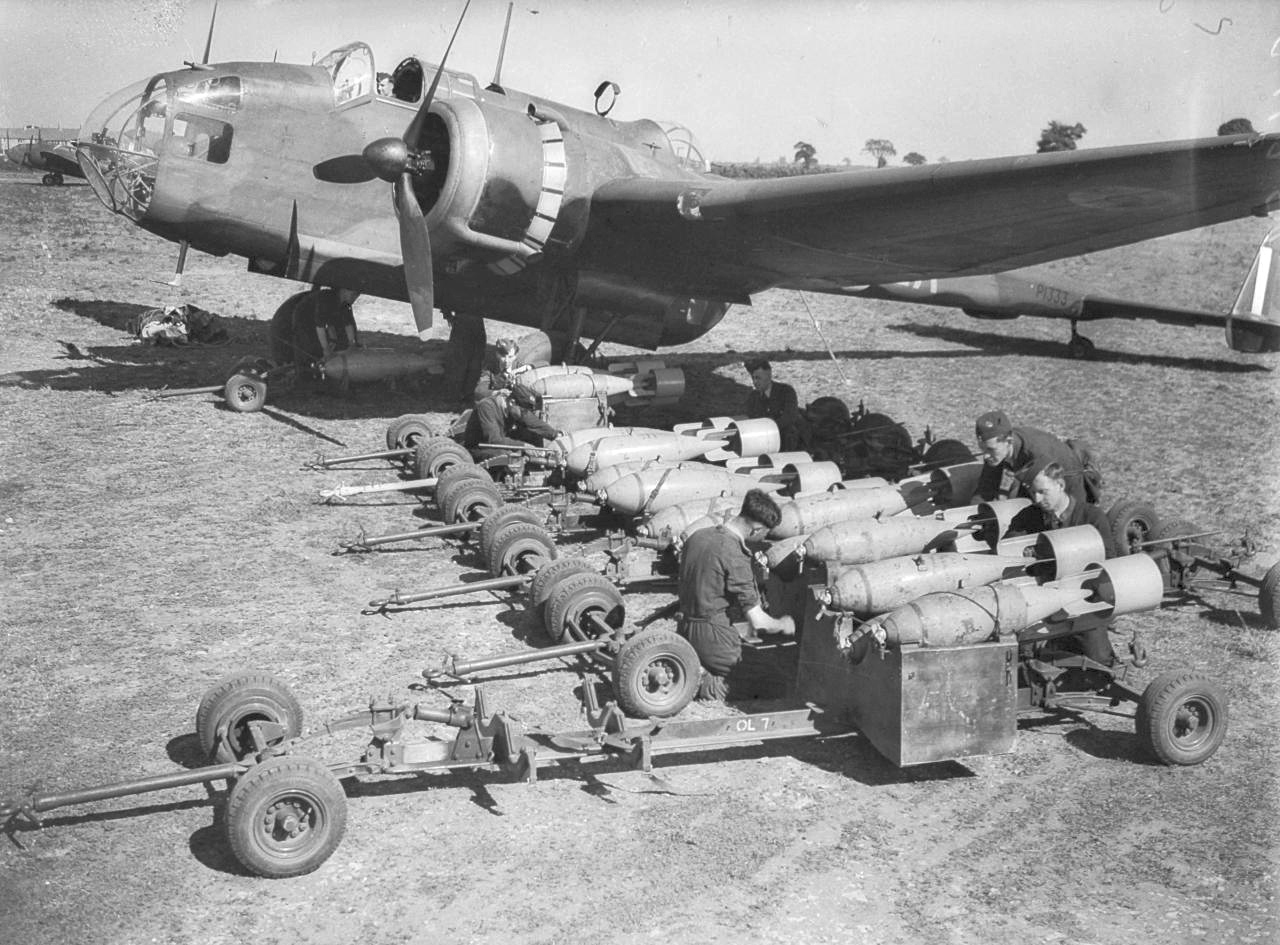
Hampden in the process of being loaded with bombs by ground crew

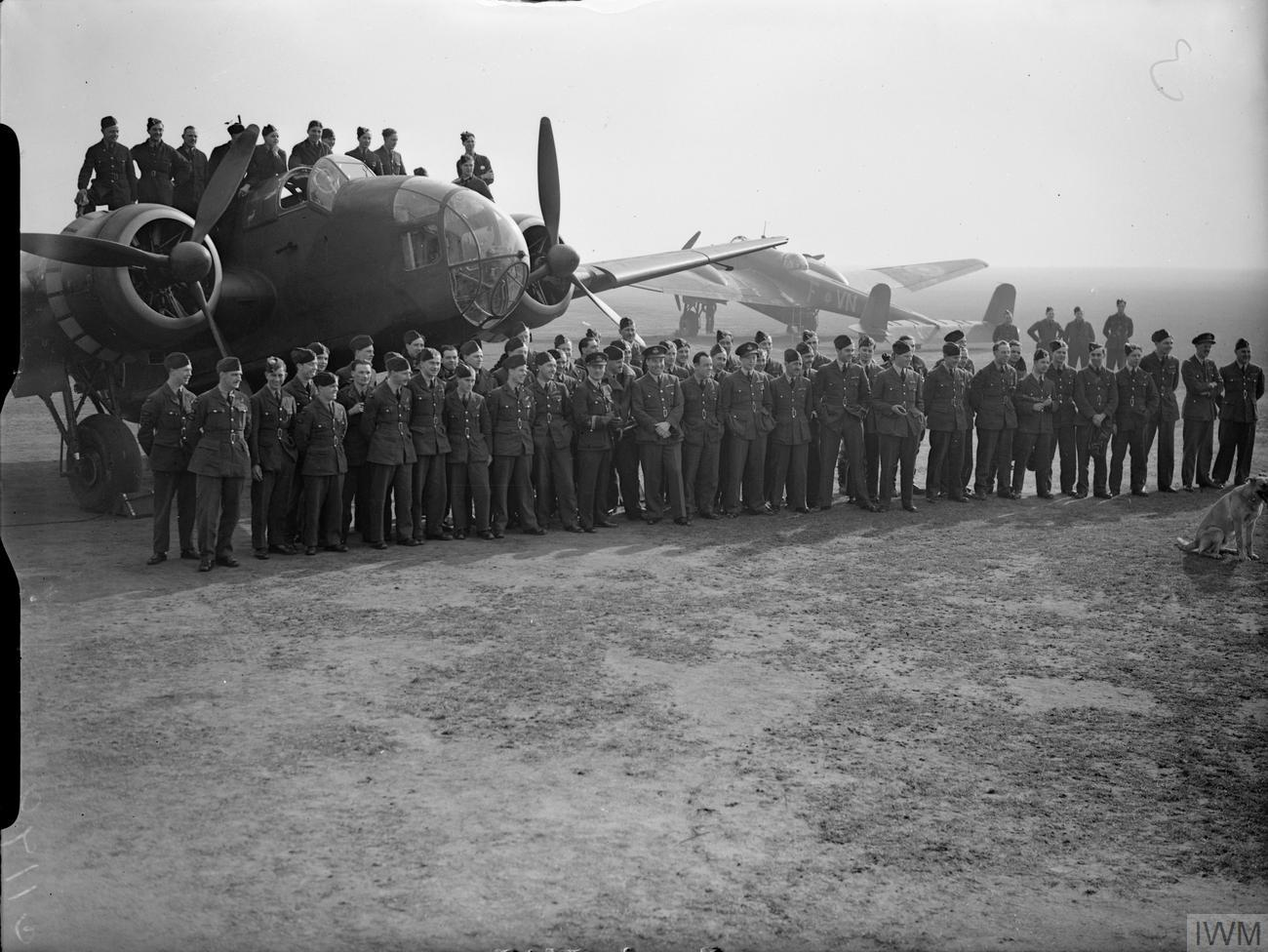
Aircrews of No. 50 Squadron in front of their Hampdens at Waddington, Lincolnshire, shortly after returning from a raid on the German fleet in the Bergen Fjord, Norway, on 9 April 1940

- Royal Air Force
  - No. 7 Squadron RAF – April 1939 to April 1940, code letters LT (pre-war) and MG (wartime)
  - No. 44 Squadron RAF – February 1939 and December 1941, code letters JW (pre-war) and KM (wartime)
  - No. 49 Squadron RAF – October 1938 and April 1942, code letters XU (pre-war) and EA (wartime)
  - No. 50 Squadron RAF – December 1938 and April 1942, code letters QX (pre-war) and VN (wartime)
  - No. 61 Squadron RAF – February 1939 and October 1941, code letters LS (pre-war) and QR (wartime)
  - No. 76 Squadron RAF – March 1939 and April 1940, code letters NM (pre-war) and MP (wartime)
  - No. 83 Squadron RAF – November 1938 and January 1942, code letters QQ (pre-war) and OL (wartime)
  - No. 97 Squadron RAF – July/August 1941, squadron code OF
  - No. 106 Squadron RAF – March 1939 to March 1942, code letters XS (pre-war) and ZN (wartime)
  - No. 144 Squadron RAF – March 1939 to October 1942, code letters NV (pre-war) and PL (wartime)
  - No. 185 Squadron RAF – June 1939 to April 1940, code letters ZM (pre-war) and GL (wartime)
  - No. 207 Squadron RAF – July/August 1941, squadron code EM
  - No. 517 Squadron RAF – August to November 1943,
  - No. 519 Squadron RAF – August to November 1943, code letters Z9
  - No. 521 Squadron RAF – September to December 1943, code letters 5O
  - No. 5 (C)OTU RAF Used between July 1942 and September 1943, Only individual code letters and numbers
  - No. 14 Operational Training Unit RAF Used between 5 May 1940 and December 1942, code letters AM, GL and VB
  - No. 16 Operational Training Unit RAF Used between 18 April 1940 and September 1942, code letters GA, JS and XG
  - No. 25 Operational Training Unit RAF Used between February and December 1941, code letters ZP
  - No. 1401 (Meteorological) Flight RAF at RAF Bircham Newton/RAF Docking
  - No. 1402 (Meteorological) Flight RAF at Aldergrove
  - No. 1403 (Meteorological) Flight RAF at Gosport/Bircham Newton/Gibraltar
  - No. 1404 (Meteorological) Flight RAF at St. Eval
  - No. 1406 (Meteorological) Flight RAF at Wick
  - No. 1407 (Meteorological) Flight RAF at Reykjavik

=== Hereford ===
United Kingdom

- Royal Air Force
  - No. 185 Squadron RAF at Cottesmore used in April 1940.
  - No. 14 Operational Training Unit at Cottesmore used from April 1940.
  - No. 16 Operational Training Unit at Upper Heyford, Oxfordshire, used from 7 May 1940.
  - Torpedo Development Unit at Gosport operated one aircraft.

== Survivors ==
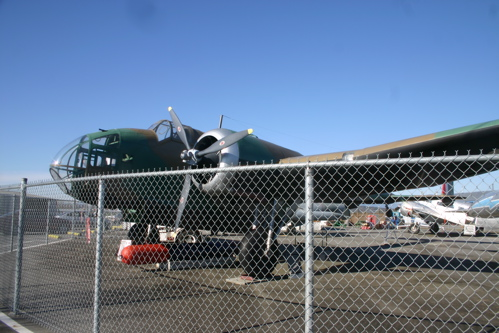
Hampden P5436 at the Canadian Museum of Flight at Langley, British Columbia c.2006

No Hampdens remain in flying condition today, although examples do remain on display or undergoing restoration:

Hampden I P1344

Recovered from a crash-site in Russia in 1991, the fuselage of the aircraft was reconstructed at the Michael Beetham Conservation Centre at the Royal Air Force Museum Cosford. The wings are in storage. During the Second World War, it served with No. 144 Squadron RAF, part of Coastal Command. In September 1942, the squadron was transferred to the Kola Peninsula in northern Russia to help protect the Arctic convoys. While in transit over Finland, P1344 accidentally flew close by a German airfield and was shot down by two scrambled Messerschmitt Bf 109s. It crashed in a wooded area of the Kola Peninsula, with three crew members killed and two taken prisoner. After its recovery by another party, the RAF Museum gained ownership of the aircraft in 1992. It was reported in 2016 that, with the help of volunteers, work on the fuselage could be completed by 2018. In July 2025 the reconstructed fuselage went on public display at the RAF Museum, Hendon.

Hampden, P5436

This aircraft has been reconstructed largely from parts of the last Canadian-built example, ditched on a training flight in November 1942 when the pilot lost control after a practice torpedo drop. The remains were recovered from 600 ft of water in Saanich Inlet on Vancouver Island in 1989. Along with recovered components from two other Hampden crashes in Canada, reconstruction was about 97 per cent complete by 2007. The restored aircraft became the showpiece exhibit at the Canadian Museum of Flight at Langley, British Columbia, in the Fraser Valley, east of Vancouver.
In January 2009, a heavy snowfall snapped off the aircraft's left wing. Despite the efforts of Museum staff to clear the accumulating snow, the wing's internal structure failed and the wing separated from the fuselage, falling onto a display case containing one of the aircraft's original engines. The wing suffered considerable damage and there was additional damage to the tail and propeller. The wing had largely been restored using wood parts because most of the metal parts of the wing structure had corroded so it did not possess the structural integrity of the original aircraft. The museum sought donations to repair the aircraft. The repairs, in 2011, included the mating of the wing and propeller to the fuselage and engine. As of November 2013, the repairs to the CMF Handley Page Hampden have been completed. The wing has been re-secured and the complete aircraft has been repainted. By 20 April 2015 the two gunner sections were open.

The Wings Aviation Museum in the United Kingdom owns the wings and tail of "P1273"; the Lincolnshire Aviation Heritage Centre is currently restoring AE436 to static display condition. Both of these were also 144 Squadron aircraft, lost during the transfer to Russia. The former, "P1273" was shot down by mistake by Soviet fighters over Petsamo. The latter was lost over Sweden, its remains discovered in a remote region by hikers in 1976.

== In popular culture ==
The HP Hampden had a featured role in The Big Blockade, a 1941 Second World War propaganda film showing "blockade" bombing and its effects on the German war industry, with Michael Rennie and John Mills as two of its four-man crew.

== Specifications (Hampden Mk I) ==
3-view drawing Hampden Mark I, with side view of the Hereford Mark I

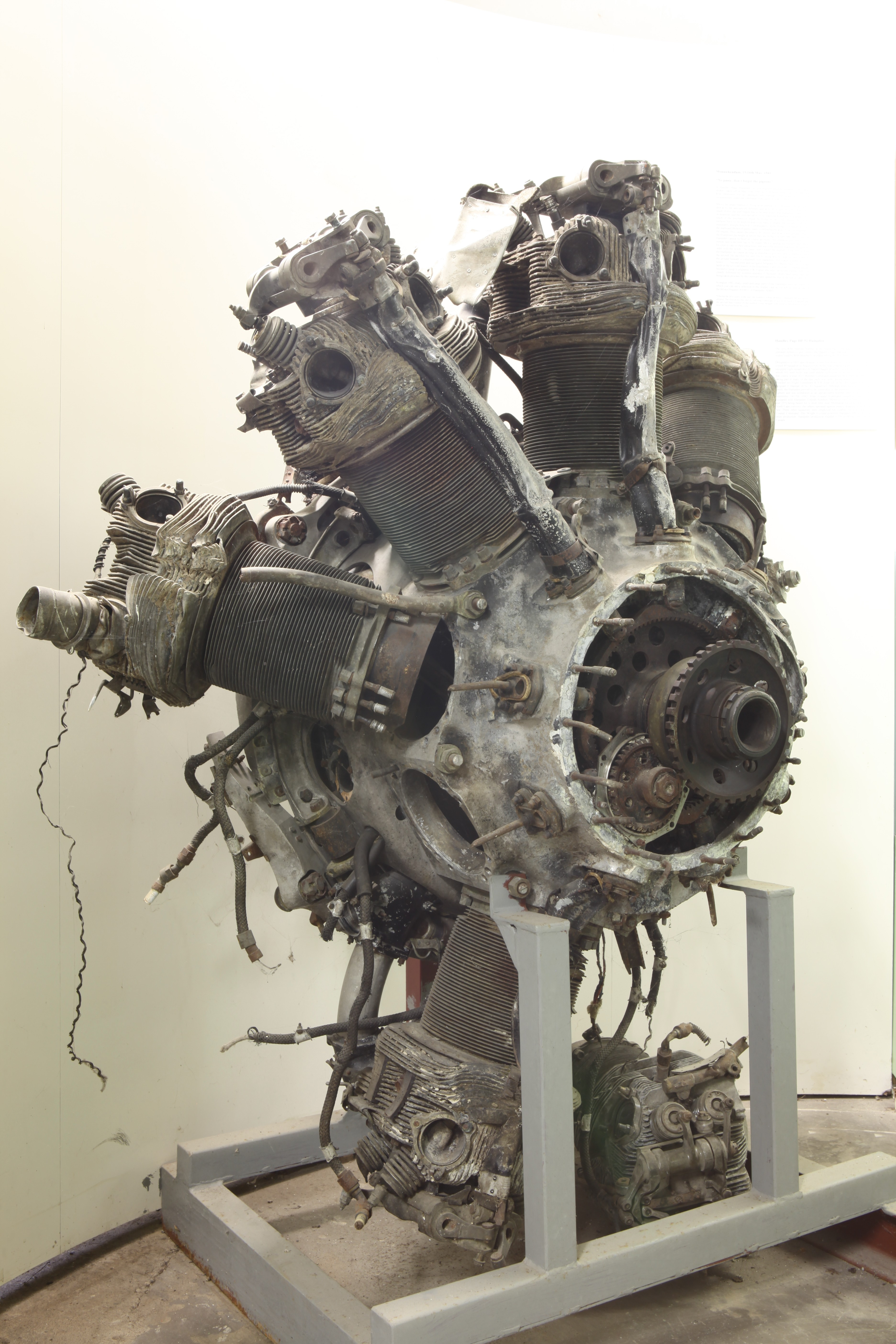
Bristol Pegasus engine from a crashed Hampden

Data from Hampden: Defender of Liberty, The Handley Page Hampden (Aircraft in Profile 58)

General characteristics

- Crew: 4 (pilot, navigator/bomb aimer, radio operator/dorsal gunner, ventral gunner)
- Length: 53 ft 7 in (16.33 m)
- Wingspan: 69 ft 2 in (21.08 m)
- Height: 14 ft 11 in (4.55 m)
- Wing area: 668 sq ft (62.1 m^{2})
- Airfoil: root: NACA 2317; tip: NACA 2311
- Empty weight: 12,764 lb (5,790 kg)
- Max takeoff weight: 22,500 lb (10,206 kg)
- Powerplant: 2 × Bristol Pegasus XVIII 9-cylinder air-cooled radial piston engines, 1,000 hp (750 kW) each at 3,000 ft (910 m)
- Propellers: 3-bladed variable-pitch propellers

Performance

- Maximum speed: 247 mph (398 km/h, 215 kn) at 13,800 ft (4,200 m)
- Cruise speed: 206 mph (332 km/h, 179 kn) at 15,000 ft (4,600 m)
- Range: 1,720 mi (2,770 km, 1,490 nmi) maximum fuel and 2,000 lb (910 kg) bombs at 206 mph (179 kn; 332 km/h)
- Service ceiling: 19,000 ft (5,800 m)

Armament

- Guns: ** 1 × fixed forward firing .303 in (7.7 mm) Mk. II Browning machine gun in nose
  - 3–5 Vickers K machine guns: one flexibly mounted in the nose, one or two each in dorsal and ventral positions
- Bombs: 4,000 lb (1,800 kg) bombload or 1 × 18 in (457 mm) torpedo or mines

== See also ==
External videos
- Period Aircraft Identification film on the Hampden
- Colour Footage of Hampden operations

Aircraft of comparable role, configuration, and era

- Armstrong Whitworth A.W.23
- Blackburn Botha
- Bristol Beaufort
- Bristol Blenheim
- Dornier Do 17
- Douglas A-20 Havoc
- Fiat BR.20
- Fokker T.V
- Ilyushin DB-3
- Junkers Ju 88
- Lioré et Olivier LeO 45
- Martin B-10
- Martin Baltimore
- Petlyakov Pe-2
- PZL.37 Łoś
- Savoia-Marchetti SM.79
- Tupolev SB
- Vickers Crecy
- Yokosuka P1Y

Related lists

- List of aircraft of World War II
- List of bomber aircraft
- List of aircraft of the Royal Air Force
- List of aircraft of the Royal New Zealand Air Force and Royal New Zealand Navy
