= Canadian Museum of Flight =

Aviation museum in Langley, British Columbia, Canada

- Established: 1977
- Location: Langley, British Columbia, Canada
- Coordinates: 49.099394°N 122.626068°W
- Website: www.canadianmuseumofflight.ca

The Canadian Museum of Flight (formally the Canadian Museum of Flight Association since 1998) is an aviation museum at the Langley Regional Airport in Langley, British Columbia, Canada. The museum has over 25 civilian and military jets, piston driven engine aircraft, gliders, and helicopters on display, six of which have been restored to flying condition. Other displays include an aviation art gallery and aviation artifacts.

== History ==
Due to a lack of room for expansion, the museum announced that it had reached an agreement to move to a 10,000 m^{2} (110,000 sq ft) site at Pitt Meadows Regional Airport in 2024. The museum's DC-3 was moved in January 2025 due to its location being deemed a potential obstruction to aircraft taking off and landing at the airport.

== Hampden bomber ==
The museum's Handley Page Hampden is the last of its type in existence. The aircraft was used in coastal patrol on the BC coast in World War II and crashed offshore in 1942. It was recovered in 1985 and was restored over a twenty-year period. The rare aircraft is stored outdoors, and on 26 December 2008, an especially heavy snowfall broke the left wing spars. This caused the wing to separate from the fuselage.

== Collection ==
=== Airplanes ===
Plane	Serial
Avro Canada CF-100 Canuck	Serial 38, RCAF18138
Beechcraft Model 18	
Bristol Bolingbroke	
Canadair CT-114 Tutor	
Canadair Quickie	
Conair Firecat	
de Havilland Tiger Moth	C1178
de Havilland Vampire	EEP42376, RCAF17058
Douglas DC-3	
Fleet Finch	542
Fleet Canuck	220
Handley Page Hampden	P5436
North American Harvard	07-144
Lockheed F-104 Starfighter	RCAF12645, CAF104645
Lockheed T-33	
Mignet Pou-du-Ciel	
Nelson Dragonfly	506
Radioplane BTT	
North American P-51 Mustang (2/3-scale replica)	
Royal Aircraft Factory S.E.5 (7/8-scale replica)	
Sopwith Camel (replica)	
Sopwith Pup (replica)	
Boeing-Stearman Model 75	75 523
Waco AQC-6	4646
Waco INF	3324
Westland Lysander	1194

=== Helicopters ===
Plane	Serial
Bensen B-8	
Sikorsky H-19 Chickasaw	53-4414
Struchen Ultralight	

== Affiliations ==
The Museum is affiliated with: CMA, CHIN, and Virtual Museum of Canada.

== See also ==
- Organization of Military Museums of Canada
- List of aerospace museums
- Military history of Canada
