= Bircham (disambiguation) =

Bircham is a civil parish in the English county of Norfolk, which includes the villages of Great Bircham, Bircham Newton and Bircham Tofts

Bircham may also refer to

== Place name ==
- Bircham, Alberta, a small hamlet in southern Alberta, Canada
- Bircham International University, an unaccredited distance education university
- RAF Bircham Newton, a former Royal Air Force airfield in the west of the county of Norfolk in the United Kingdom

== Surname ==
- Marc Bircham, English footballer
- Clive Bircham
- Barney Bircham
