= Docking, Norfolk =

Village in Norfolk, England

Coordinates: 52.90197°N 0.6241°E

Docking
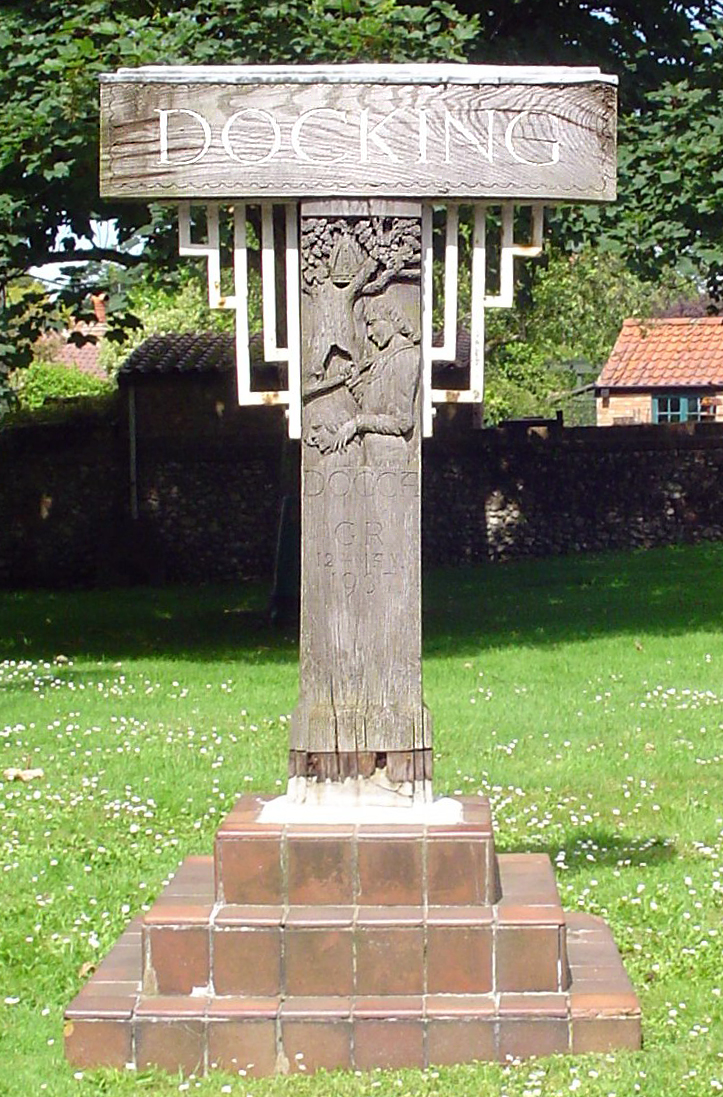
- Docking village sign, erected 1937 (according to the carved inscription).

- Location within Norfolk
- Area: 25.79 km^{2} (9.96 sq mi)
- Population: 1,200 (2011)
  - Density: 47/km^{2} (120/sq mi)
- OS grid reference: TF765370
- Civil parish: Docking
- District: King's Lynn and West Norfolk
- Shire county: Norfolk
- Region: East
- Country: England
- Sovereign state: United Kingdom
- Post town: KING'S LYNN
- Postcode district: PE31
- Police: Norfolk
- Fire: Norfolk
- Ambulance: East of England

Docking is a village and ancient civil parish in the King's Lynn and West Norfolk borough of Norfolk, England. It is near the North Norfolk Coast Site of Special Scientific Interest.

== Correct pronunciation ==
"Dockun"

== Topography ==
=== Parish ===
The parish covers an area of 25.79 km^{2} (9.96 sq mi) (one of the larger ones in Norfolk) and had a population of 1,150 in 469 households at the 2001 census, including Barwick (which is, however, a separate historical locality). The population had risen to 1,200 at the 2011 census.

Docking village in the centre of the parish is situated at an elevation of 82.7 metres (272 feet), which makes it one of the highest in Norfolk. It is surrounded by arable farmland having little woodland and is a nucleated settlement, with only one historical hamlet associated with it. This is Summerfield to the north-west, the site of a separate medieval village. The two modern hamlets in the parish are Burntstalk to the west around the former workhouse, and Docking Common to the south-east which postdates the enclosure of the village common in 1859.

The village dominates the ancient road layout of north-west Norfolk, and has a total of thirteen old radial routes. These link to surrounding villages, as follows (clockwise from west): Sedgeford, Ringstead, The Drove (not a village, but the lane is evidence of a lost settlement on the A 149), Thornham, Titchwell (lane is now partly private farm driveways), Brancaster, Brancaster Staithe, Burnham Market, Stanhoe, Tattersett, Bircham Tofts (now a footpath), Bircham Newton followed by Great Bircham, and Fring.

=== Village layout ===
Docking is a linear or street village, in the shape of a crescent with three historical nodes. The central focus and the main road junction is accompanied by the church, and has three streets forming a triangular block. These are Well Street, the location of the village's former water supply, Church Place and Chequers Street. To the north runs Station Road, to historical North End and the former railway station. The village pub, the Railway Inn, is here. To the east runs High Street, arriving at the third node marked by The Green. This is a small triangular area now under tarmac, accompanied by a cluster of old houses around Middle Road.

The "Docking Heritage Group" have been making limited archaeological investigations and collating evidence since 2012, and one conclusion is that the village's layout has changed little over the centuries. This is owing to the dearth of finds in neighbouring fields.

However, earthworks within the present deer park of Docking Hall indicate that the medieval village additionally extended due south of the church.

=== Water supply ===
In the past the village used to be nicknamed "Dry Docking", as it had no water supply of its own except rainwater. This was owing to its elevation, which meant that the water table was deep and wells difficult to dig. A feature of the village landscape are several large surviving dew ponds, created as reservoirs into which rainwater was channeled.

In the 1760s a single well was sunk some 230 feet down, which provided domestic water for the village at a farthing per bucket (the money went to pay an attendant who worked the windlass, since there was no pump). A water tank mounted on a horse-drawn cart also circulated around the village selling water to villagers by the bucket. The use of this well continued until 1936, when water was eventually piped into the village.

Later, the well was closed and capped over to allow for the widening of Well Street.

== History ==
=== Overview ===
Docking has been a farming community for its entire history, and has experienced no noteworthy historical events peculiar to itself.

Archaeological finds in the parish have been numerous, but unfortunately these have mostly been loose artefacts and no site demonstrating stratigraphy has been excavated.

The origins of the striking radial road pattern are unknown. It indicates that Docking was a very important location at one time, but even the millennium of this cannot be guessed at. Unknown also is the institution here which provided the importance, sited on its hilltop. The focus of the pattern is the present church, but this does not prove that the institution concerned was necessarily religious. However, there are no traces of any defensive earthworks appropriate to a putative hillfort.

=== Stone Age ===
Mesolithic (10 000 to 4 000 BCE) flints have been found north-east of Summerfield (TF754 391)

The "Norfolk Heritage Explorer" online database lists fourteen Neolithic flint axes found individually in Docking parish, indicating the major clearance of primeval woodland by the first farmers after 4 000 BCE.

=== Bronze Age ===
A hoard of Bronze Age metalwork, including axes, was found in a field north-east of the village by a metal detectorist in 2013 (grid ref TF 771 387). This had been disturbed by ploughing, and items had already been recovered on the surface. The total number of items is twenty. The hoard is now at Lynn Museum.

An artificial hillock called "The Mount", in the grounds of Docking Hall, has been pointed out as a Bronze Age round barrow. However, this could be an 18th-century garden feature.

The parish has three known ring ditches tentatively identified as ploughed-out round barrows. Two are close together just south-west of Summerfield (grid ref. TF 7468 3978). A third is east of Summerfield (grid ref. TF7603 3882).

=== Romans ===
A substantial number of surface finds, including coins, at Sunderland Farm (grid ref. TF 78 39) has been claimed as indicating the site of a Roman villa. However, the finds do not contain any architectural items indicating a high-status building.

A very high-status 3rd century gold openwork ring set with garnet, green glass and pale sapphire was found in an unrecorded location in the Fifties, and sold at auction. Its present whereabouts are unknown.

=== Early Middle Ages ===
The present village has Saxon roots. The name is Old English, meaning either docce innung (newly enclosed land with dock plants), or docca ingas (Docca's clan). The latter is thought more likely, as there are several other place-names in Norfolk on this pattern. Early Saxon pottery, Middle Saxon pottery and a brooch and pin and Late Saxon pottery have all been found in the parish, close to the present village itself.

The first documentary reference to the village is in the will of Aelfric bishop of North Elmham, who bequeathed it to Bury St Edmunds Abbey in 1038. The abbey soon lost ownership, because the Domesday Book records the village as being in the possession of a private individual in 1086.

=== Docking Priory ===
There is currently a village archaeological project to locate the site of a lost priory believed to have been in the area during the 13th and 14th centuries. The existence of this presently (2019) relies on documentary evidence only, which describes an alien priory belonging to the abbey of Notre Dame d'Ivry at Ivry-la-Bataille in France. The latter had been founded by Roger d'Ivry, who had taken part in the Norman conquest of England. The church of St Mary belonged to the priory, but it is unknown whether the monks used it or had their own church on a different site.

The priory was suppressed in 1450, and its property and the church ended up with Eton College.

The relationship, if any, to the priory of the farm called "St Catherine's Cross" is unknown.

=== Later Middle Ages ===
In the reign of King Henry I the Lovell family acquired the manor at Docking, and held it for most of the Middle Ages. Their obscure origins were also at Ivry. They were later mainly based at Titchmarsh, Northamptonshire.

The Lovell Lord of the Manor acquired a market charter for Docking in 1242, with the market being held on Thursdays. However, the venture failed and the village did not become a market town.

Docking has two neighbouring deserted medieval villages. To the north-west is the hamlet of Summerfield, which used to be the village of Southmere with its own parish church dedicated to St Andrew (grid ref: TF 7479 3850). The village was abandoned in the mid 16th century, and the parish combined with that of Docking. The name of "Docking with Southmere" was then used for the latter until the 20th century. The other deserted medieval village is Choseley on the lane to Thornham, which was also parochial. The church was abandoned probably in the 16th century, but here the parish was kept. The main cause of the abandonment of these villages was that the land around Docking was being converted from arable into pasture by the landowners.

The south-east part of the parish was occupied by Docking Common, an extensive open-access area of grassy heath available as common land for the use of the poorer people of the village. This was on both sides of the present B1454 road.

=== Post-medieval ===
The manor house was rebuilt in 1612, to become Docking Hall. Part of the village was appropriated for its grounds, and earthworks belonging to this are still visible.

The hall grounds were extended to form a deer-park in about 1750. This had terraced formal gardens by the house, an avenue of trees focused on a temple (now gone) and "The Mount" a belvedere mound (thought by some to have been originally a round barrow).

The work was instigated by Catherine Henley, who became Lady of the Manor in 1743. She also commissioned the digging of the village's well in 1760, together with four other wells on her estate for the use of herself and her tenants. She ordered the planting of 140 acres of trees -beforehand, the parish lacked woodland.

=== 19th century ===
In the early 19th century, Docking was hosting a magistrates' court or Petty Sessions on the last Monday of the month at the Hare Inn, on the present Station Road. The same establishment, founded in the 17th century but renovated and extended at this time, was also the post-house or centre of horse-drawn public transport for the village. The village stocks used to be located outside the inn for malefactors found guilty, but these are now by the village sign. The "Cage" or village lock-up, a tiny windowless prison, survives from the same period and is at the west end of Chequers Street. The village's old stray animal pound is next to it.

The Cage became redundant when a police station was opened in the village in 1854.

The Docking Poor Law Union, a federation of parishes for the purpose of dealing with paupers, had a workhouse built on a green-field site in 1836, west of the village on the Sedgeford road. The architect was John Brown. The workhouse closed down at the outbreak of the First World War.

In 1859, Docking Common was enclosed and privatised by an inclosure act of 1845. Most of the common became farmland, but a strip of grass heathland was left along the south-west side of the present B1454. This was called "The Cover".

A National school was founded in the village in 1860, the ancestor of the present school.

The railway station opened in 1866. A Working Man's Institute was founded in 1869, and this is the ancestor of the present Village Hall.

The village windmill, on Mill Lane off the High Street, was converted to steam power in the 1880s. The church and Hall were restored and extended by the architect Ewan Christian in the same decade (the work on the church began in 1875).

The Docking Rural District Council was established in 1894, and lasted until 1974.

=== Earlier 20th century ===
Thirty-one local men were killed in the First World War, and thirty of them were listed on a carved grey granite Celtic cross war memorial in the churchyard. The one left off by mistake, Edward Dudley Twelvetrees (1918), is commemorated by a plaque in the church. Also in the latter is a plaque to John Burgis, a soldier who was killed in the Maritz rebellion in South Africa at the outbreak of war.

The workhouse was sold by its Board of guardians in 1920 to the Rural District Council, which converted it into twelve council houses. Thus was created the hamlet of Burntstalk (this is now known as Norfolk Heights after the property was sold to private developers).

The United Automobile Services, a geographically sprawling bus company which began operations in Norfolk in 1912, established its route 31 in the Twenties. This ran from Norwich through Fakenham and Docking to Hunstanton. In 1931 the Norwich operations became the Eastern Counties Omnibus Company, which operated double-decker buses on the route.

=== RAF Docking ===
Fourteen local men died in active service during the Second World War, and their names were added to the war memorial.

RAF Docking was a former Royal Air Force airfield open from 1940 until 1958. During the war it was a satellite airfield of RAF Coastal Command and home to several Royal Air Force and Royal Canadian Air Force squadrons. Aircraft carried out Coastal Command patrol duties and meteorological flights. RAF Bircham Newton and RAF Sculthorpe were also nearby but are also now inactive.

RAF Bircham Newton (partly in Docking parish, despite the name) now houses a campus of the National Construction College, run by the Construction Industry Training Board.

During their RAF enlistment actors Richard Burton, Robert Hardy, Warren Mitchell and footballer Danny Blanchflower were based at Docking Hall. The Hall at that time was being used as RAF accommodation and continued to be used after the end of the war to accommodate enlisted personnel whose services were not required and were awaiting demobilization. Burton's brother recalled that Burton's nickname was: 'The Squire of Docking'.

The presence of the airfield, as well as the village's proximity to the coast, meant that the latter was provided with substantial defensive works much of which survive. Notably it has four Norcon pillboxes, three loopholed walls, one Blacker Bombard pedestal and two very rare Tett turrets with underground passages.

=== Recent times ===
Mechanisation of the parish's farmland, and conversion of pasture to arable, has meant the loss of many hedgerows and the grubbing out of some of the small 18th century woods since the Second World War. "The Cover", the surviving remnant of Docking Common, was ploughed up except for a small wooded area by Docking Common hamlet.

In 1952, Terence Rowland Wagg, as the chairman of T R Wagg (The Baker) Ltd, built a large bakery in the village. His family used to run the village windmill in the late 19th century, and he had run a bakery in a village shop since 1930. His firm was the only Docking business which made an impact outside the village, as he established a chain of bakery shops with attached coffee houses in west Norfolk towns as well as selling wholesale. His business only survived two years after his death in 1975.

The railway closed to passengers in 1952.

The major recent event affecting the village was the collapse of its bus services, when the Stagecoach in Norfolk bus company shut down in 2018. No commercial bus company was prepared to take on the routes, so an emergency non-commercial arrangement had to be set up by Norfolk County Council.

== Governance ==
In Saxon times, Docking had its own small hundred. This was annexed to Smithdon Hundred in the late 11th century.

The Hundred remained as the local authority unit until the formation of the Docking Rural District Council in 1894. Before this, the Docking Poor Law Union operated from 1836, and the Docking Rural Sanitary District from 1875.

For the purposes of local government, the village now falls within the district of King's Lynn and West Norfolk. This was set up in 1974, annexing the Rural District Council. The village's ward has the title "Docking and Burnham Market". This ward had a population of 1,937 at the 2011 Census.

Docking Parish Council has a limited responsibility for some local amenities, such as the playing field and meeting hall. and also raises matters of concern with the District Council and other appropriate authorities.

== Places of worship ==
The Anglican village church is dedicated to St Mary the Virgin, and is mostly 14th and 15th century in date with Victorian restorations. The chancel is earlier than the nave. The two 19th-century restorations were by Frederick Preedy and Ewan Christian. There is a very good late mediaeval font with figurative carving featuring saints, and notable modern stained glass

The parish clergy here used to be responsible for services at the "Docking Union Chapel", which was part of the workhouse facilities until the workhouse closed down in 1914. This had its own cemetery.

Presently (2019) the Docking parish clergy belong to the "United Benefice of Docking", which also includes the neighbouring churches of Great Bircham, Bircham Newton, Fring, Sedgeford and Stanhoe.

In the 19th century the village had three Methodist chapels, but the last closed before 2009. This started life in 1836 as the Primitive Methodist chapel, and was at Chapel Cottages on the High Street just west of the Docking Fish Bar. The Wesleyan Methodist chapel was earlier, 1821, and was located a few yards to the west. The two denominations were united in 1932, but the subsequent history of the Docking chapels is not clear. Finally, the Wesleyan Reform Preaching House was located near the large pond to the west of the playing field, and was opened in 1851. The site is now under grass.

There has not been a Roman Catholic place of worship at Docking since the Reformation.

== Historic public houses ==
The village had four pubs in the mid 20th century, but three had closed down by 2010. The survivor is the Railway Inn, which is also the terminus of the village's bus service. The pub was opened in 1868 by Truman's Brewery of London.

The three older pubs were all owned by Bullards Brewery of Norfolk, taken over by Watneys Brewery in 1963. The Plough in Chequers Street (late 18th century) was closed in 1969, and is now "Horseshoe Cottage". The Hare in Station Road (17th century) closed in 2005 and the King William at The Green in 2009 (now demolished and redeveloped).

A new pub, the "Pilgrim's Reach", opened on the High Street in the 1980s but was shut down in 2006.

== Facilities ==
The Docking Primary and Nursery School is on Chequers Street.

The Bayfield Surgery occupies a new building off the High Street, east of Bradmere Lane.

The SPAR village shop with Post Office is on Station Road.

The Playing Field, with a simple skateboard ramp, is on Bradmere Lane.

The Village Hall, formally named the "Dr W.E. Ripper Memorial Hall", is also on the High Street and hosts an indoor market on Wednesday mornings.

As Docking is close to the coastal resorts of Hunstanton, Heacham and Brancaster, there are several bed-and-breakfast establishments in the village.

== Noteworthy buildings ==
Docking has fifteen listed buildings, all Grade II except the church which is Grade II*.

Already mentioned are the church, with its 1875 lychgate and War Memorial (separately listed); Docking Hall with its gateway (separately listed); the lock-up; the stocks; the two Tett turrets (listed together), and the two former pubs The Plough (now Horseshoe Cottage) and The Hare.

The other five buildings are domestic residences:

- "Bank House", High Street (next to Mill Lane junction), decorative shop front in stucco c.1840. Formerly H.E. Marsh Hardware.
- "Holland House", Chequers Street. Mid 18th century.
- "Manor Farmhouse", between Well Street and Pound Lane, early 17th century.
- "Manor Cottage", opposite Well Street north end. Late 17th century, although with datestone reading 1742.
- "The Coracle" with "The Lodge", on Well Street. Late 18th century, two dwellings in building.

== Transport ==
=== Roads ===
Docking is on the B1454, running from Fakenham to Hunstanton. The B1153 crosses this at the village, running from Brancaster to Narborough, and the B1155 runs from the village to Burnham Market.

=== Railway ===
Until 1952 the village had its own Docking railway station, on a railway between Heacham railway station and Wells. This line was opened by the West Norfolk Junction Railway in 1866, and passenger services were run as a shuttle from a bay platform at Heacham to Wells-next-the-Sea.

Connections were available at Wells for onward travel to Fakenham and Norwich, and at Heacham for King's Lynn and Hunstanton. However, the need to change trains for the towns meant that the service was vulnerable to bus competition. As a result, the village's station was closed to passengers in 1952 along with the rest of the line, as part of the first set of cutbacks of Britain's railways after nationalisation in 1948. The station remained open for goods trains until 1964, after which the track was lifted.

=== Buses ===
In 2019, the village's bus service was the 21 running from King's Lynn via Flitcham and Great Bircham and terminating at the Railway Inn near the old station. This had a basic service of three each way (two on Saturdays), with two extra buses on schooldays and one on Tuesdays only. This service was part of the "Go to Town" outreach, a non-commercial venture by the West Norfolk Transport Project which is a registered charity.

Additionally, in 2019 the Lynx bus company were running a school bus through the village from Dersingham to Wells-next-the-Sea early in the morning, and back in mid-afternoon. This was for the benefit of pupils of the Alderman Peel High School.

Before 2018, the village was served by a loop of the Stagecoach "Coasthopper" service, running from King's Lynn to Cromer. Some buses on this ran from Brancaster through Docking to Heacham instead of via Hunstanton, and provided the village's route to King's Lynn. The village was also on the route 31 from Fakenham to Hunstanton, allowing for connections to Norwich.

As of 2024 Docking is served by the bus no. 33, operated by Lynx, which runs from Kings Lynn to Hunstanton and stops in Docking.

== Mythology ==
On 19 June 1969 at 12.25am, Robin Peck, a radio and television engineer, is alleged to have witnessed a bright-blue object shaped like an inverted mushroom that hovered around 40 metres high in the air at a distance of 400 metres. Adding to his claims are alleged electromagnetic interference effects from the object that caused his Ford Thames van's electrical system to completely cut out when in the object's presence; he felt a lot of static electricity in the air.

Bircham Newton airfield squash courts are allegedly haunted by the crew of a bomber which crashed here, and who were fond of playing the game.

== Notable residents ==
- Saint Henry Walpole, Jesuit priest and martyr, born in Docking in 1558.
- Rev. George Smith, defender of Rorke's Drift during the 1879 Zulu War, born in Docking in 1845.
- Nick Aldis, General Manager of Smackdown, locum GM of Raw, professional wrestler and 2008 Gladiator on the UK version of the show.
- Richard Burton, served at former RAF Docking and lived in Docking Hall.
- Warren Mitchell, served at former RAF Docking and lived in Docking Hall.
- Robert Hardy, served at former RAF Docking and lived in Docking Hall.
- Danny Blanchflower, served at former RAF Docking and lived in Docking Hall.
