= Great Bircham Windmill =

Tower mill in Norfolk, United Kingdom

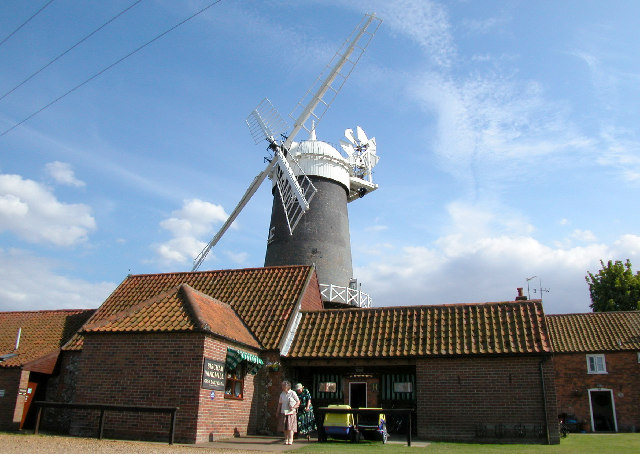
- Great Bircham Windmill
- Interactive map of Great Bircham Windmill

Origin
- Mill name: Great Bircham Windmill
- Grid reference: TF 7606 3272
- Coordinates: 52.8628°N 0.6135°E
- Operator: Private
- Year built: 1846

Information
- Purpose: Corn mill
- Type: Tower mill
- Storeys: Five storeys
- No. of sails: Four sails
- Type of sails: Double Patent sails
- Windshaft: Cast iron
- Winding: Fantail
- Fantail blades: Six blades
- No. of pairs of millstones: Three pairs, of which two pairs remain.

Great Bircham Windmill is a Grade II listed tower mill in Great Bircham, Norfolk, England.

== History ==
The earliest record of a windmill in Great Bircham is in 1761, when miller Richard Miller made his will. The mill, which was probably a post mill, was offered for sale in 1769. In 1800 the miller, Robert Sparham, was in financial difficulties and made a Deed of Assignment. In 1804 the mill was offered for sale or to let by George Humphrey. The next miller was Bloom Humphrey, who was followed by his widow Martha and then their son George. The mill remained in the Humphrey family until it was demolished c1846 to enable a new tower mill to be built on its site.

The tower mill was built for George Humphrey in 1846, a date stone to this effect is located between two windows on the first floor of the mill. The mill was built from cream coloured bricks, but was later tarred. The mill was offered to let in 1856 and again in 1861. An accident in March 1864 in which George Humphrey was driving his cart whilst drunk resulted in the death of his wife Elizabeth. In April the mill was ordered to be sold by the mortgagees. An auction was held on 13 May at the Hare Inn, Docking. The next millers were Henry and Philip Stanton, followed by Walter Palmer. He left Norfolk in 1882 and Joseph Wagg took the mill, followed by a succession of Howards. William Howard was the last miller. The mill was working in 1916 but had ceased by 1922. The sails and fantail had been removed by 1934.

The mill was part of the Houghton Estate of the Marquess of Cholmondeley. In 1939 the mill was sold to the Queen, becoming part of the Sandringham Estate. The mill was purchased from Queen Elizabeth II by Roger Wagg in May 1976 and restoration of the mill commenced in 1977.

The restoration of the mill began in 1977. The cap frame was removed on 17 August 1979 by Messrs Lennard & Lawn, millwrights, based at Caston. The new cap was fitted on 2 August 1979. The first pair of sails were fitted on 17 May 1980 and the second pair on 26 May 1983. The tower was coated with Bellecoat Stipple, a black resin-based protective covering. Internally, new floors were fitted, and a new stage constructed around the mill. Replacement machinery was sourced from other windmills. The drive for the sack hoist came from Harpley.

== Description ==
Great Bircham Mill is a five-storey tower mill with a stage at third-floor level. The tower is 52 feet (15.85 m) to curb level and 25 feet (7.62 m) outside diameter at the base, with walls 2 feet 6 inches (760 mm) thick. It has an ogee cap with a gallery. The cap is winded by a six-bladed fantail. Four double Patent sails are carried on a cast-iron windshaft. The wallower and upright shaft are of cast iron. The great spur wheel has a cast-iron center and iron teeth. The mill drives two pairs of French Burr millstones.

== Millers ==
Post mill

- Richard Miller 1761-84
- Robert Sparham 1800
- George Humphrey 1804
- Bloom Humphrey 1836-
- Martha Humphrey -1845
- George Humphrey 1845-46

Tower mill

- George Humphrey 1846-64
- Henry Stanton 1864-75
- Philip Stanton 1864-75
- Walter Palmer 1878-82
- Joseph Wagg 1883-88
- Thomas Howard 1890-96
- Mrs Howard 1900-08
- William Alfred Howard 1912-16
- Roger Wagg 1976-2006
- Steve & Elly Chalmers 2006 to date

Reference for above:-

== Public access ==
Great Bircham Windmill is open daily from Easter to the end of September between 10:00 and 17:00. Coach parties by arrangement.
