= Bircham Tofts =

Village in Norfolk, England

Coordinates: 52.861°N 0.641°E

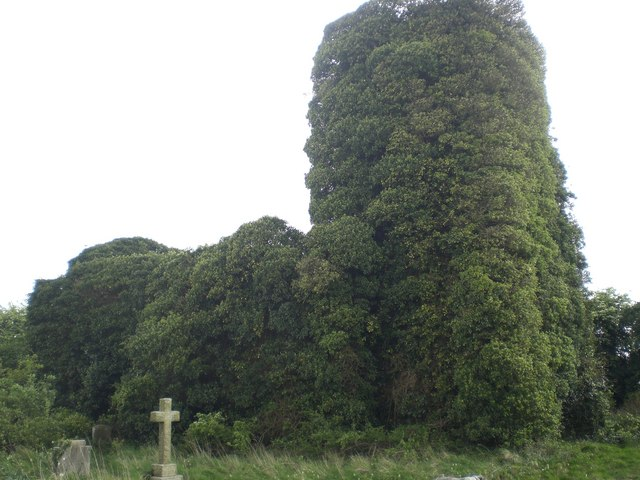
- The ruins of the church of St Andrew

- Location within Norfolk
- OS grid reference: TF779326
- Civil parish: Bircham
- District: King's Lynn and West Norfolk
- Shire county: Norfolk
- Region: East
- Country: England
- Sovereign state: United Kingdom
- Post town: King's Lynn
- Postcode district: PE31
- Dialling code: 01485
- UK Parliament: North West Norfolk

Bircham Tofts is a village in the civil parish of Bircham, in the King's Lynn and West Norfolk district, in the county of Norfolk, England. It is located 0.5 miles (0.80 km) east of Great Bircham, 12 miles (19 km) north-east of King's Lynn and 32 miles (51 km) north-west of Norwich.

== History ==
Bircham Tofts' name is of Anglo-Saxon origin. In the Domesday Book, the village is listed as a settlement of 10 households in the hundred of Docking. In 1086, the village was part of the estates of Odo of Bayeux.

According to the 1931 census, Bircham Tofts had a population of 96. This was the last time separate population statistics were collected for Bircham Tofts. On 1 April 1935, Bircham Tofts was merged with Great Bircham and Bircham Newton to form the civil parish of Bircham.

== St. Andrew's church ==
Bircham Tofts' former parish church was dedicated to Saint Andrew but during the Second World War found itself within the boundaries of RAF Bircham Newton, making it inaccessible to its congregation. As a result, St. Andrew's was abandoned, the lead from its roof was removed in 1952 and the building is now completely overgrown with ivy and elder.

== Governance ==
Bircham Tofts is part of the electoral ward of Bircham with Ruddhams for local elections and is part of the district of King's Lynn and West Norfolk. It is part of the North West Norfolk parliamentary constituency.
