= Barwick, Norfolk =

Civil parish in Norfolk, England

Coordinates: 52°52′55″N 0°40′26″E

Barwick
- Location within Norfolk
- Area: 2.03 sq mi (5.3 km^{2})
- OS grid reference: TF800350
- District: King's Lynn and West Norfolk
- Shire county: Norfolk
- Region: East
- Country: England
- Sovereign state: United Kingdom
- Post town: KING'S LYNN
- Postcode district: PE31
- Police: Norfolk
- Fire: Norfolk
- Ambulance: East of England

Barwick is a scattered hamlet and civil parish in the north-west part of the English county of Norfolk. It is near the larger village of Stanhoe, and is 15 miles (24 km) north-east of King's Lynn and 50 miles (80 km) north-west of the city of Norwich.

The civil parish has an area of around 2 square miles (5.2 km^{2}), and in the 2001 census it had a population of 21 in 8 households. In the 2011 Census, the population remained less than 100 and was included in the civil parish of Docking. For local government, the parish falls within the district of King's Lynn and West Norfolk.

== History ==
The village of Barwick is mentioned in the Domesday Book and was located at the present Barwick Hall Farm. Earthworks of the deserted medieval village were traceable until recently.

The Domesday Book mentions a village church, dedicated to St Mary. This was in what is now a wood called Churchyard Plantation, south of the present Barwick House. It was abandoned in the 16th century after the village was deserted, and only a few low walls survive.

In 1171 the church and adjacent land were acquired by Old Buckenham Priory, which founded a hamlet called Middleton just to the north of the former. Barwick and Middleton continued as separate settlements until the 15th century. The desertion of the old village of Barwick occurred during the tenure of Thomas Thoresby, the founder of Thoresby College in King's Lynn, and of Middleton earlier. The sites became two farms, which were known as Great Barwick (the old village) and Little Barwick (Middleton) by the 17th century. The former went on to become Barwick Hall Farm, the latter Barwick House.

== Topography ==
The locality is marked by Barwich Road, which runs south from the southern end of the adjacent village of Stanhoe. To the west of this is the wooded deer park of Barwick House, the seat of the Glover family. The mansion is a grade II listed building, with a mid-18th-century core and 19th-century accretions. Down a driveway running east is Barwick Hall Farm, which is also Grade II listed and is of the early 19th century.

Elsewhere, the parish contains only a very few scattered dwellings. However Hyde Close, a residential street which is part of RAF Bircham Newton, is in the south-west corner.
