= Heacham River =

River in Norfolk, England

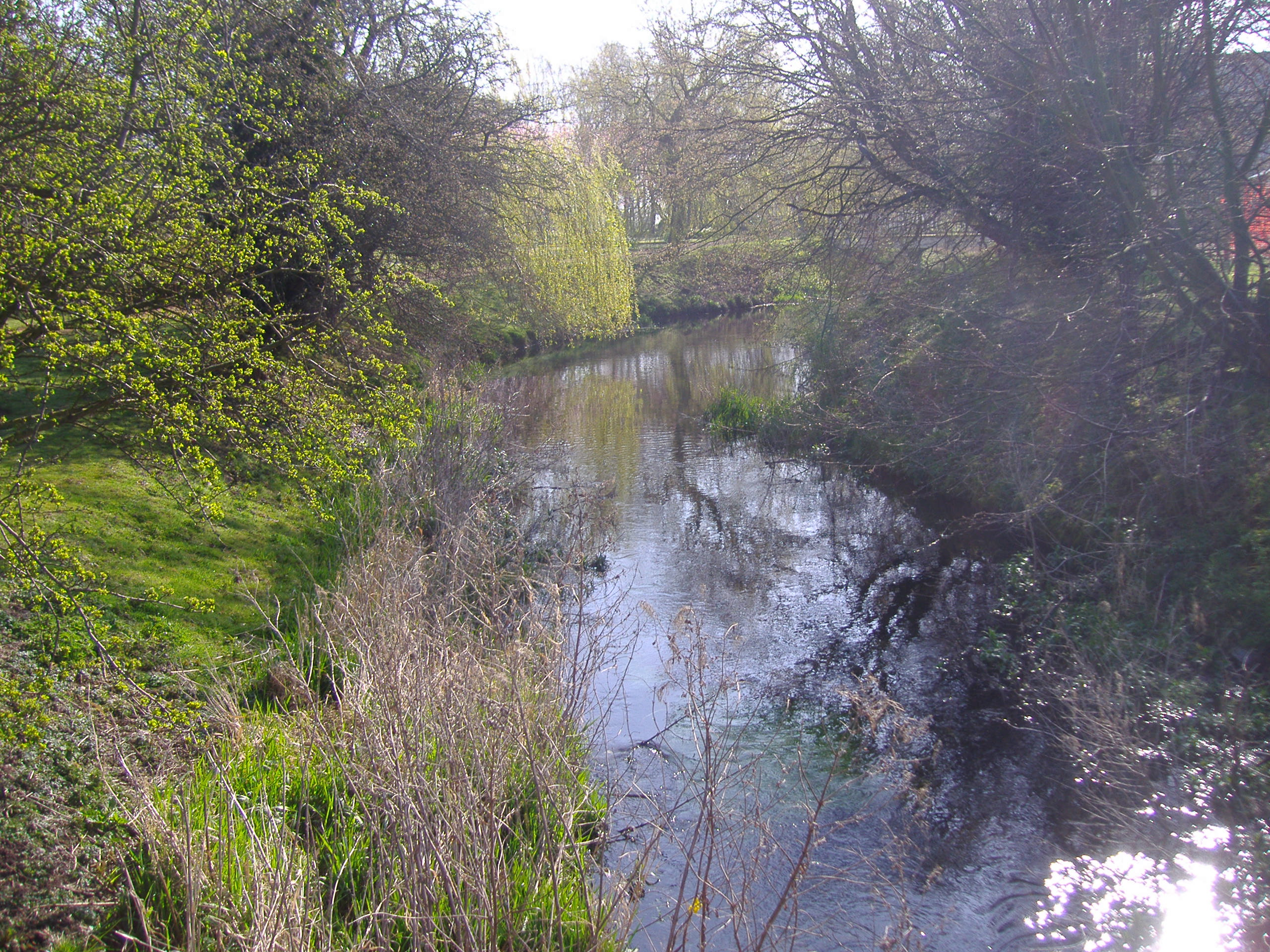
- Heacham at Sedgeford

- Location of the river mouth within Norfolk

Location
- Country: England
- County: Norfolk

Physical characteristics
- Source
  - location: Bircham Newton
  - coordinates: 52.873°N 0.614°E
- Mouth
  - location: The Wash at Heacham Beach
  - coordinates: 52.903732°N 0.470384°E
- Length: 16.4 km (10.2 mi)
- Discharge
  - location: Heacham
  - average: 0.21 m^{3}/s (7.4 cu ft/s)

Heacham River is a small river in the King's Lynn and West Norfolk district of the English County of Norfolk. Its source is near the village of Bircham Newton grid reference TF762 339, 25 metres above sea level. The river is a chalk stream and is 16.4 kilometres (10.2 mi) long from the source to the outfall on Heacham beach, which discharges into The Wash at low tide.

== Course ==
From its source at a pond near Bircham Newton the river flows towards Fring where it is crossed by Peddars Way and then runs across open countryside in a north westerly direction. Over the years this part of the river has been heavily modified but without any significant flood defence. After 2 miles the river runs through a shallow wooded valley south of the village of Sedgeford. From Sedgeford the river slowly curves north west towards Heacham crossing under the B1454 road and then turns west towards the only mill on the river. Just past the road bridge the river divides into two: one branch which once fed the millpond for the mill, and the other running past the mill.

== Heacham Watermill ==
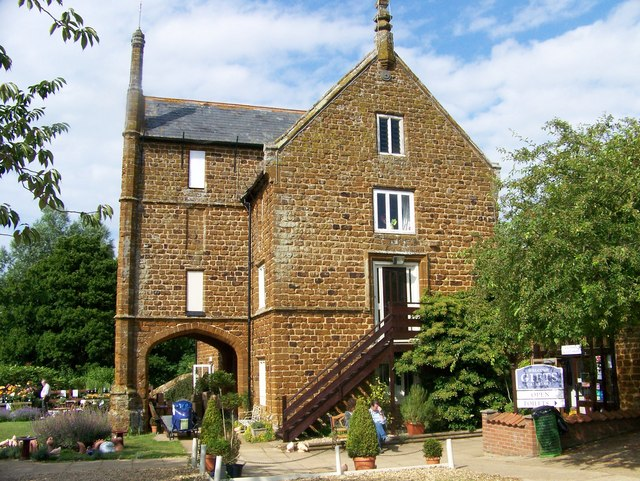
Caley Mill

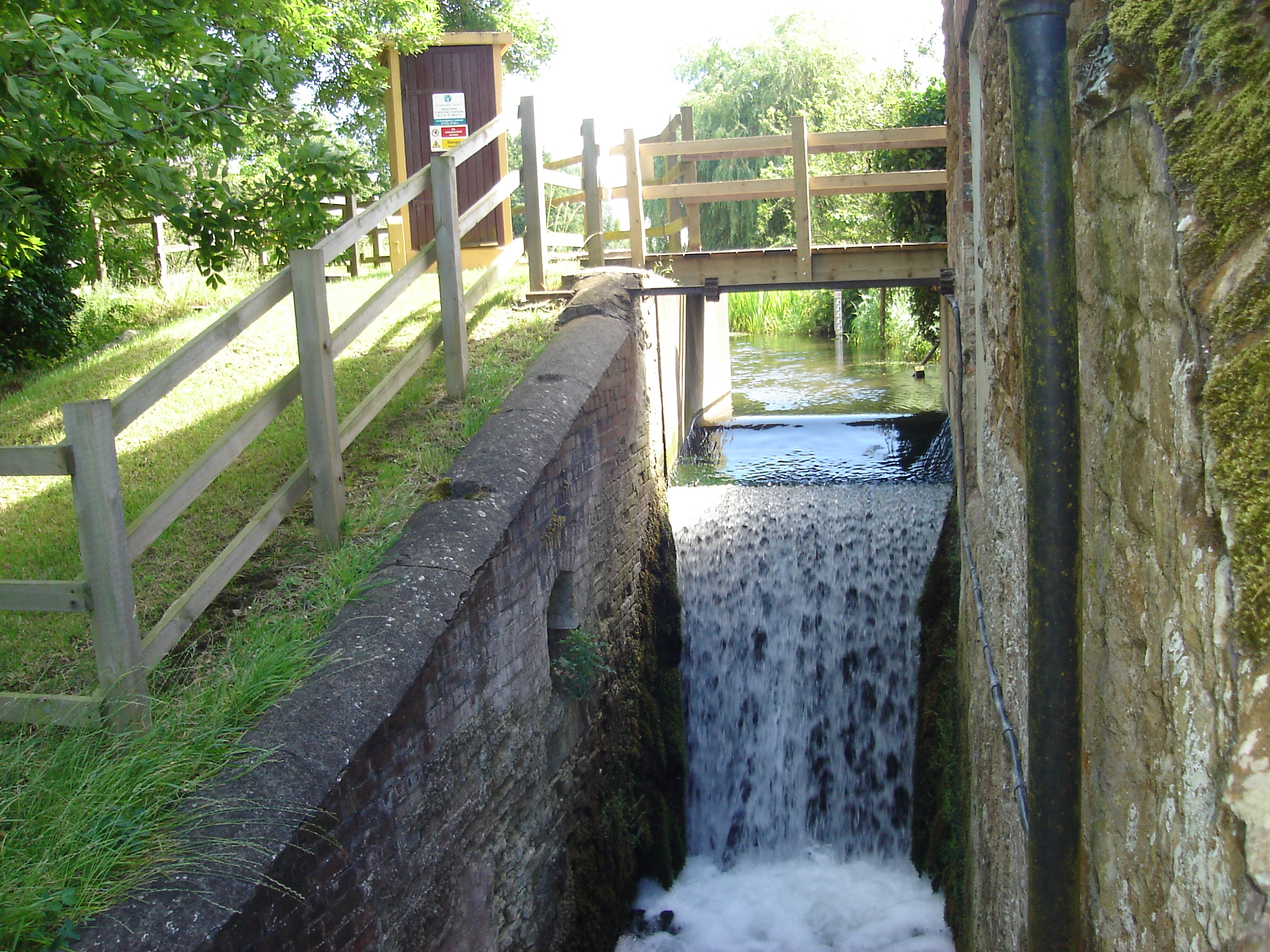
Caley Mill-the mill-race

Heacham watermill or Caley Mill, as it is also known, looks very different from most other mills in Norfolk, being Gothic revival in architectural style and built of local carrstone. It was also unique in Norfolk for having its waterwheel on the outside of the building. Originally used to grind corn, the building is now owned and has been used by Norfolk Lavender for lavender production since 1932. After the mill the river passes under the A149 coast road and then skirts around the northern side of the village of Heacham. The river then flows through Heacham Park where a channel from it feeds a small lake. After the lake the river goes north for a couple of hundred feet before turning west again crossing low-level meadows. The river ends up against the tidal flaps at South Beach between Snettisham and Heacham, where it fills a series of pools that run parallel to the coast. These pools discharge at low tide. The river supports a varied and diverse wildlife population including the water vole. There is also a small breeding trout population in the upper reaches, while in the lower reaches eels can be found.

== See also ==
- List of rivers of England
