= Heacham =

Village in Norfolk, England

Coordinates: 52°54′25″N 00°29′24″E

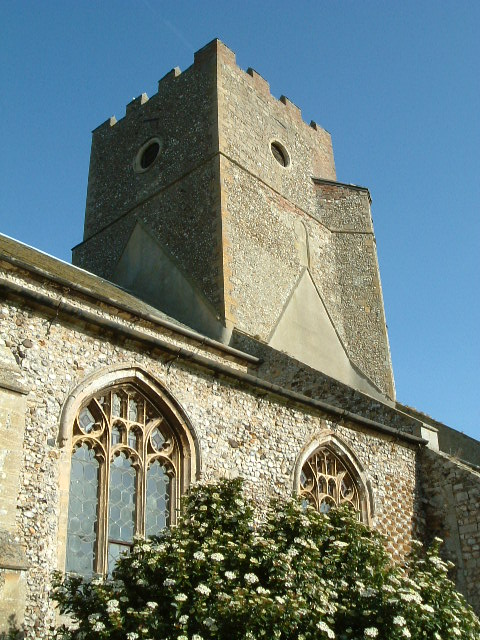
- Heacham Church

- Location within Norfolk
- Area: 17.66 km^{2} (6.82 sq mi)
- Population: 4,750 (2011 census)
  - Density: 269/km^{2} (700/sq mi)
- OS grid reference: TF675372
- District: King's Lynn and West Norfolk
- Shire county: Norfolk
- Region: East
- Country: England
- Sovereign state: United Kingdom
- Post town: KING'S LYNN
- Postcode district: PE31
- Dialling code: 01485
- Police: Norfolk
- Fire: Norfolk
- Ambulance: East of England
- UK Parliament: North West Norfolk

Heacham is a large village in West Norfolk, England, overlooking The Wash. It lies between King's Lynn, 14 miles (23 km) to the south, and Hunstanton, about 3 miles (4.8 km) to the north. It has been a seaside resort for over a century and a half.

== History ==
There is evidence of settlement in the Heacham area over the last 5,000 years, with numerous Neolithic and later Bronze Age finds within the parish. This is presumably because the local geology consists of primarily cretaceous sands and underlying chalk, meaning that there is very little surface water for miles in any direction. This can also be seen along the banks of the Caudle Carr outside Dersingham, where numerous archaeological finds have been made. Running water along with fertile surrounding lands made Heacham an ideal place for settlement by early man. Evidence of habitation continues through the Iron Age into the Romano-British era.

However, the present village probably did not appear until the 5th century, with the Anglo-Saxon invasion and the beginnings of present-day East Anglia.

The name of the village is said to derive from a 12th-century Norman lord, Geoffrey de Hecham. This is possible, but unlikely, as the name "de Hecham" literally means "of Hecham", implying that the place name already existed. The name Hecham was noted in the Little Domesday Book, written around 1086 as part of the Smithdon hundred (Smetheduna). Before the Norman Conquest, Heacham was held by two Saxons, Alnoth, and Toki the king's thegn, whose estates centred around a hall in Castle Acre. After the Norman Conquest, the lands passed to William de Warenne and his brother-in-law Frederick de Warenne, who was later killed by Hereward the Wake.

Smethden HUNDRED. Of the fief of Frederick. Hecham was held by Toki, a free man, TRE (Tempore Regis Eduardi). There have always been 7 ploughs in demesne and 70 bordars and 6 slaves, and 12 acres of meadow and 7 ploughs belonging to the men; woodland for 100 pigs, and 3½ mills; 1 fishery; always 1 horse, 30 head of cattle, 60 pigs, 600 sheep. Here belong 35 sokemen, 1½ carucates of land; always 6 ploughs, 4 acres of meadow. Then it was worth £12, now 15. In the same place William de Warenne holds 2 carucates of land which Alnoth, a free man, held TRE. There have always been 26 bordars and 2 slaves and 6 acres of meadow, and 2 ploughs in demesne, and 1½ ploughs belonging to the men, and half a mill, and 1 salt-pan and 1 fishery, and 4 sokemen [with] 2 acres (0.81 ha). Then [there were] 12 head of cattle, now 16. Then [there were] 30 pigs, now 40. Then [there were] 80 sheep, now 60.

The name Heacham is more likely to derive from the local river, the Hitch, in conjunction with the Old English place-word "ham", which meant either "homestead, village, manor, estate" or "enclosure, land hemmed by water or marsh or higher ground, land in a river bend, river meadow, promontory".

In 1085 Heacham manor was given by William de Warenne to a cell of Cluniac monks from the Priory of St Pancras of Lewes, to pray for the soul of his late wife Gundreda. After the dissolution, about 1541, the manor passed to Thomas Howard, 3rd Duke of Norfolk.

== Medieval economy ==
In 1272 Heacham was granted by royal charter a weekly market on Wednesdays and 3 days during the mid-August Fairs on 14, 15 and 16 August.

By 1300 the population of Heacham was estimated at 1200 to 1500, making Heacham a small town.

In the market women in the upper layer of Heacham tenant families were prominent the Heacham ale and bread market. Even in the baking sector where men had a large share in the production of bread, women dominated the market by their numbers. The market involved women from all of the community, top to bottom, with 531 women belonging to 231 families. Between 1276 and 1324, around the time of the great European famine, the Leet Court sessions listed many women selling ale or bread who were not able to pay the licensing tax and were declared by the aletasters and the steward presiding the court condonatae causa paupertatis (pardoned for the sake of poverty).

The participation of women in the market gave them opportunity to build economic and public roles in the community. As examples Matilda Peper was elected aletaster in 1314. Alice de Redham, Alice Genever1307; Alice, Isolda and Sabina Elnot, 1310; Isabel Rocelin, 1315 and again 1320; Agnes le Notere, 1324) were elected collectores.

The survey Inquisitio Navium of 1337 mentions 12 Heacham tenants owning fishing ships. The richest, Simon Lambriht, had 7 ships ranging from 5 tons to 32 tons.

There was some long-distance trade, wood from Scandinavia or woollen cloth from Flanders, stone from Normandy. The bulk of the Heacham traffic was with other Norfolk ports, and especially Bishop’s Lynn where Heacham sent fish, salt, corn in bulk or flour sacks, and sacks of wool. Heacham was the maritime outlet for a number of land-locked manors in North West Norfolk. The Heacham demesne accounts mentions its horse-drawn carts often transporting a harvest surplus as far as Fakenham.

The port of Heacham imported from Lynn goods for everyday life, particularly for the building trades. It imported mill-stones and iron manufactured goods, nails, horseshoes, iron parts for the ploughs and tools, the carts and the mills, leather and wool manufactured goods for clothing and the farming economy.

The ships that enabled this trade would be Cogs, flat bottomed boats widely used from the North Sea to the Baltic.

== Church ==
The Church of St Mary the Virgin is the oldest functioning building in the village. Norman in style, it dates from 1230. The earliest record of the church, a covenant for building a chapel to the Blessed Virgin Mary, being from 1248.

Until September 2024, the cupola on the tower housed a bell dating from around 1150, which made it the oldest in Norfolk and seventh oldest in the country. In September 2024, after almost 40 years of being incapable of being rung due to irreparable damage, the old bell was removed from the tower and replaced. The old bell is now displayed in the church and rung on special occasions.

The transepts of the church 3.7 metres (12 ft) from the east end have been lost and the roof has been lowered.

== Pocahontas ==
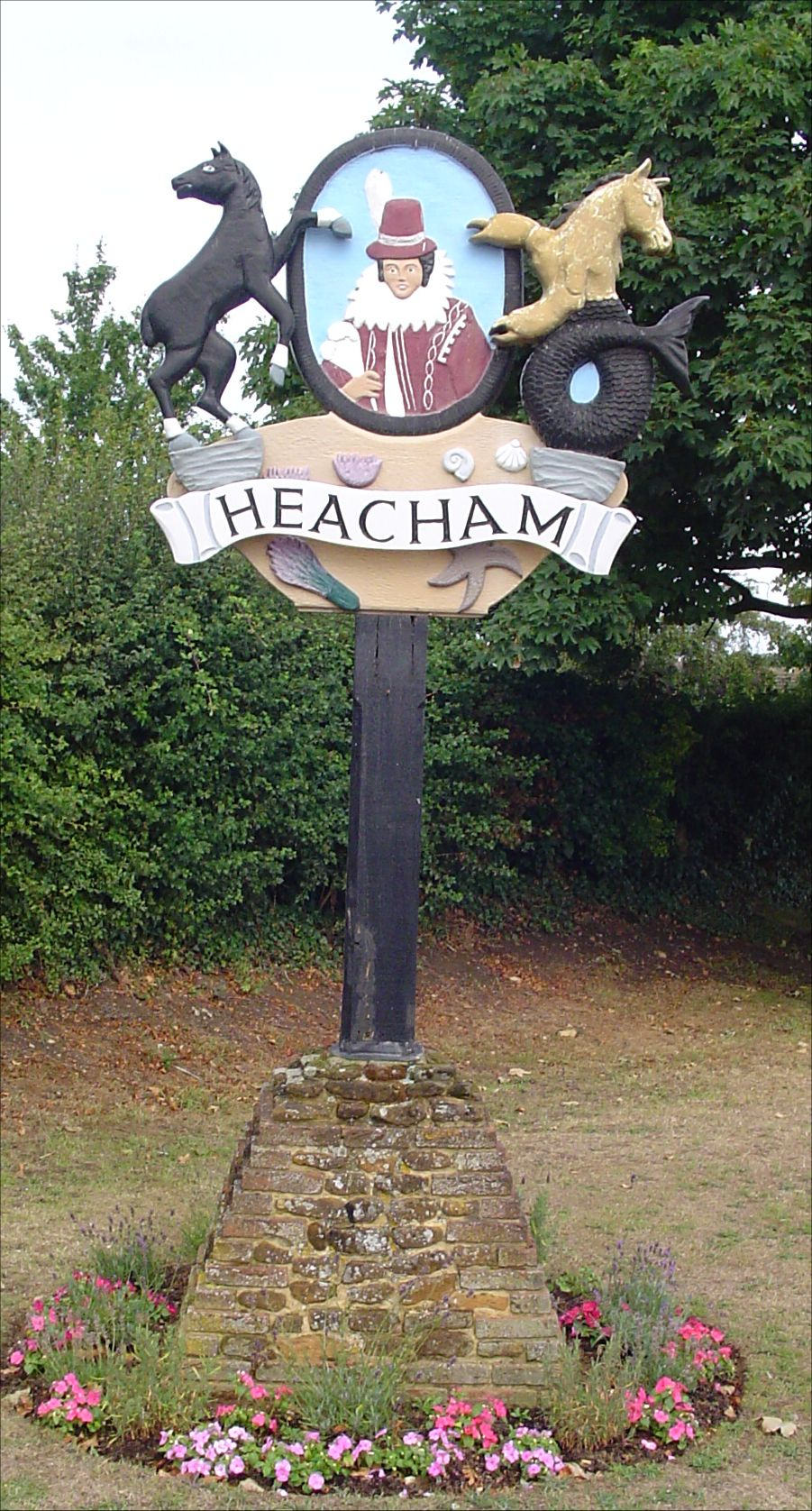
Village sign depicting Lady Rebecca Rolfe (Pocahontas)

Heacham has historic ties to Matoaka (better known as Pocahontas), who married John Rolfe on 5 April 1614 at a church in Jamestown, Virginia. Rolfe took his wife, Rebecca (Pocahontas), and their two-year-old son, Thomas, to visit his family at Heacham Hall in 1616, but settled in Brentford. A year later, Rebecca died in Gravesend, when John was going to return her to Virginia. She was laid to rest at St George's parish churchyard. After that, John returned to Virginia with Tomocomo. Samuel Argall commanded the ship. Thomas was guarded by Lewis Stukley and later adopted by John's brother Henry. John married Jane Pierce two years later. They soon had a daughter named Elizabeth. Perhaps John lost his life in the 1622 Native American massacre near Jamestown. The Rolfe family residence, Heacham Hall, burned down in 1941.

== Beaches ==
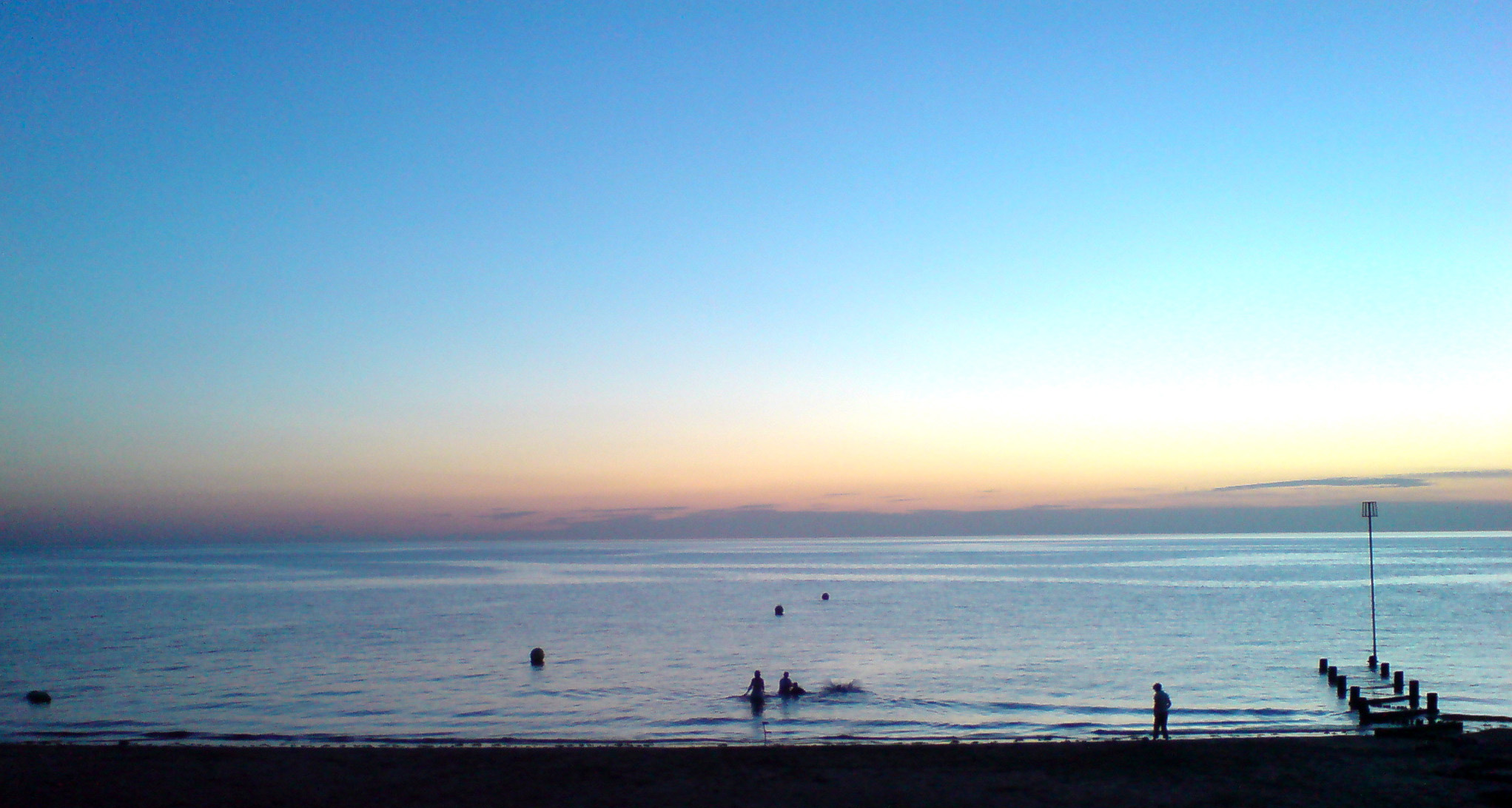
Sunset at Heacham beach

Heacham became popular as a seaside resort with the Victorians, when the railway between King's Lynn and Hunstanton opened in the early 1860s. This culminated in the building of the Jubilee Bridge in 1887 to replace an old wooden bridge, using unspent subscriptions from parishioners to the celebrations for Queen Victoria's Diamond Jubilee. Heacham is still popular as a seaside resort. Both the North Beach (Jubilee) Road and South Beach Road are lined with caravan parks.

Heacham's beaches are on the east banks of The Wash. They are among the few in eastern England where the sun sets over the sea, not the land.

On 29 July 1929, Mercedes Gleitze became the first woman to swim The Wash, completing the crossing on a third attempt. Originally aiming for Hunstanton, she came ashore at Heacham after battling strong tides for over 13 hours. Heacham was badly affected by the North Sea flood of 1953: nine people died when the sea broke through. In early 2013, an exhibition of the North Sea Flood was held at St Mary's Church, with contributions from Heacham's infant and junior schools and from other villagers.

== Norfolk lavender ==
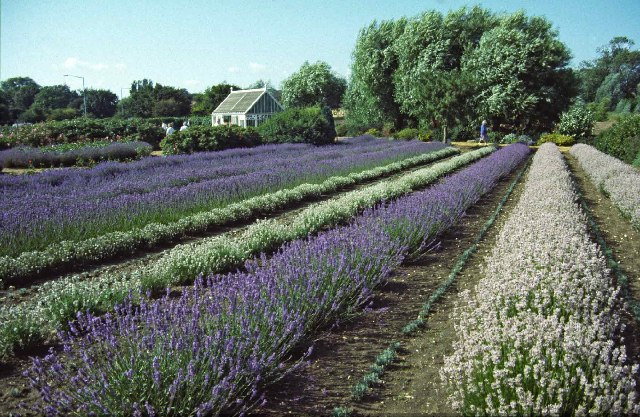
Lavender fields

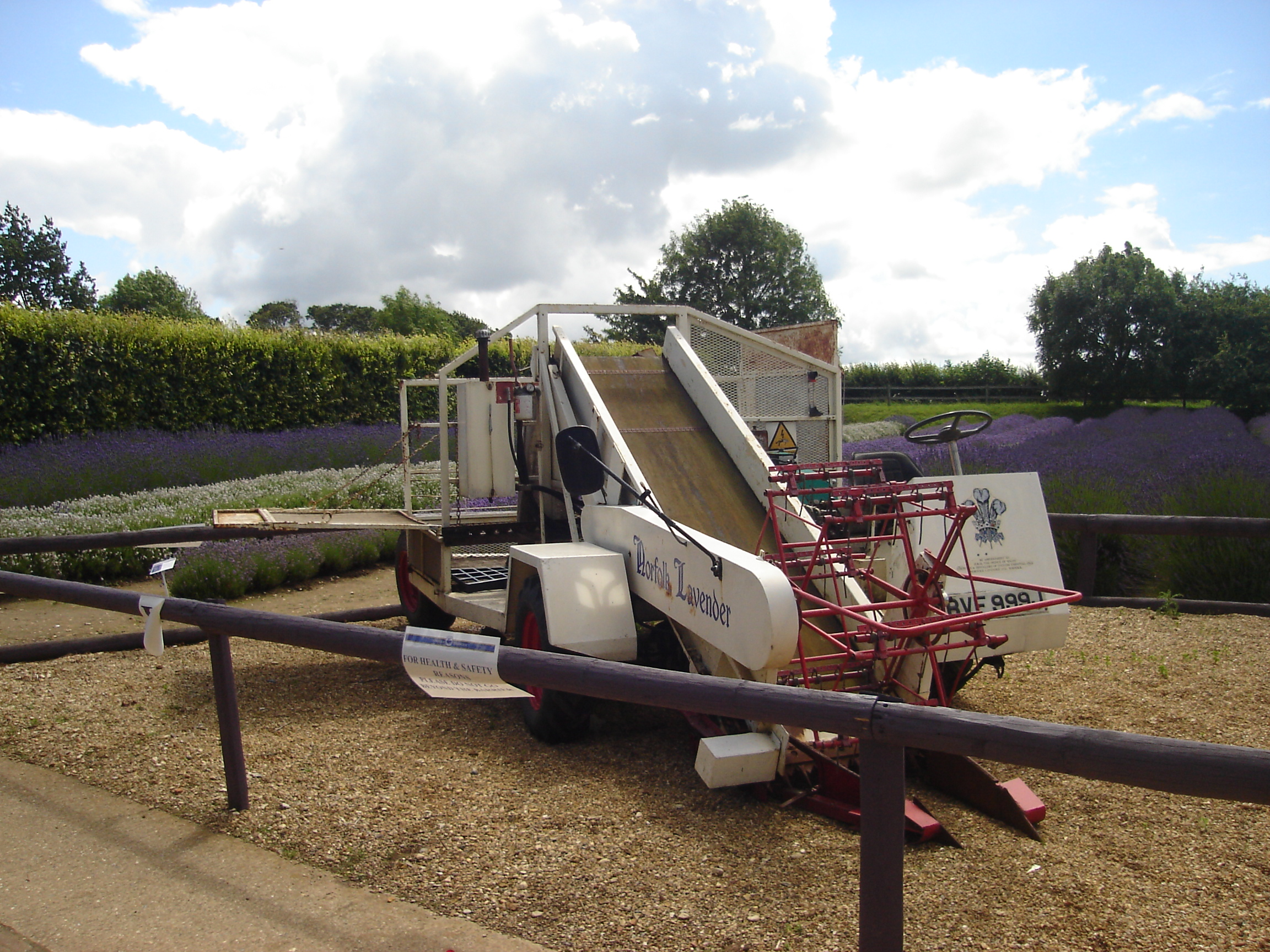
Harvester

Norfolk Lavender Ltd was founded in 1932. Linn Chilvers supplied the plants and the labour and Francis Dusgate of Fring Hall the land. The first lavender beds were planted on Dusgate's land at Fring; in 1936 Dusgate acquired Caley Mill on the River Heacham and the ground around it, not for building but for the land. Lavender has been grown there ever since. A kiosk was erected, from which bunches of lavender were sold to passing pre-war traffic.

By 1936 Caley Mill was disused. No major repairs were carried out until 1953–1954, after a new A149 road with a lay-by and kiosk had been built, which cut across the lavender field. Further repairs and restoration were carried out at the mill in 1977–1978 and in the late 1980s. Since the early 1990s its output has widened to include other typical English floral fragrances. These are sold at home and abroad.

== Transport ==
Frequent bus services via Heacham are run by Lynx between King's Lynn and Hunstanton. The village railway station was open from 1862 to 1969.

== Notable people ==
In birth order:

- William de Warenne, 1st Earl of Surrey (died 1088), held land here.
- John Rolfe (1585–1622), early settler in Virginia and husband of Pocahontas, was born here.
- Charles Atmore (1759–1826), Wesleyan evangelist, was born here.
- Robert Gunther (1869–1940), historian of science at Oxford University, is buried here.
- John Metcalfe (1891–1965), novelist, was born here.
- Patrick Hadley (1899–1973), composer and conductor, retired here.
- Moss Evans (1925–2002), general secretary of the Transport and General Workers' Union, died here.
- Judy Cornwell (born 1940), actress, went to school here.
- Colin Garwood (born 1949), professional footballer, was born here.
- Mary Mackie (living), writer of romance and non-fiction, lives here.
- James Donaldson (born 1957), professional basketball player, was born here.
- Trisha Goddard (born 1957), TV presenter, went to primary school here.
- Brendan Coyle (born 1962), actor, lives here.

== War Memorial ==
Heacham War Memorial is a large stone cross flanked by two large tablets surrounded by brick steps, close to St. Mary's Church. The memorial lists the following names for the First World War:

Rank	Name	Unit	Date of death	Burial/Commemoration
Capt.	Bertram R. Jackson	1st Bn., Coldstream Guards	15 Sep. 1916	Guards' Cemetery
Capt.	Peyton S. Hadley MC (Note: Captain Hadley was a scholar at Charterhouse School and Pembroke College, Cambridge where he excelled at running, football and cricket. Hadley was awarded the Military Cross for gallantry in leading bombing raids of German trenches and was wounded twice over the course of the war. He eventually died of the Spanish Flu.)	7th Bn., Northamptonshire Regt.	25 Oct. 1918	St. Mary's Churchyard
Lt.	Arthur B. Thorne (Note: Lieutenant Thorne was killed in a flying accident whilst flying a RE8 and had previously played for Surrey County Cricket Club.)	No. 64 Squadron RAF	8 May 1918	St. Mary's Churchyard
Lt.	Leonard Falkner	8th Bn., Lincolnshire Regiment	25 Sep. 1915	Loos Memorial
SMaj.	Frederick J. Jelley	Norfolk Regiment	1915	St. Mary's Churchyard
QSjt.	William G. Richardson	9th Bn., Queen's Royal Regiment	4 Feb. 1916	Hammersmith Cemetery
LSjt.	George Jewell	7th Bn., Norfolk Regt.	13 Oct. 1915	Loos Memorial
LSjt.	Alec S. Chapman	9th Bn., Norfolk Regt.	26 Sep. 1915	Loos Memorial
LCpl.	David Graver	12th Bn., Durham Light Infantry	17 Jul. 1916	Thiepval Memorial
LCpl.	William E. Buck	2nd Bn., Essex Regiment	21 Jul. 1916	Couin Cemetery
LCpl.	Charles W. Bray	8th Bn., Royal Inniskilling Fusiliers	16 Aug. 1917	Tyne Cot
LCpl.	Walter E. Anderson	1st Bn., Norfolk Regiment	23 Apr. 1917	Arras Memorial
LCpl.	Herbert M. Benstead	1st Bn., Norfolk Regt.	4 Aug. 1916	La Neuville Cemetery
LCpl.	Alexander H. Kay	7th Bn., Norfolk Regt.	21 Nov. 1915	Chocques Cemetery
Dvr.	Albert W. Dix	Army Service Corps att. 29th Div.	12 Aug. 1915	Mudros East Cemetery
Pte.	Victor Menghetti	58th (Central Ontario) Bn., CEF	8 Oct. 1916	Vimy Memorial
Pte.	Walter G. Lawson	Canadian Light Infantry	8 May 1915	Menin Gate
Pte.	Leonard J. Dennis	202nd Coy., Royal Defence Corps	2 Feb. 1918	St. Mary's Churchyard
Pte.	Alfred Bird	3rd Regt., Dragoon Guards	11 Apr. 1917	Arras Memorial
Pte.	Robert E. Ewen	1st Bn., Essex Regiment	13 Aug. 1915	Helles Memorial
Pte.	John Roythorne	10th Bn., Essex Regt.	26 Apr. 1918	Hangard Wood Cemetery
Pte.	John J. Fowle	11th Bn., Essex Regt.	28 Jun. 1917	Philosophe Cemetery
Pte.	George B. G. Boyce	6th Bn., Gordon Highlanders	28 Jul. 1918	Courmas Cemetery
Pte.	Arthur Worthington	9th Bn., Leicestershire Regiment	27 Oct. 1917	Tyne Cot
Pte.	Ernest J. Franklin	3rd Bn., Norfolk Regiment	8 Jul. 1915	St. Sever Cemetery
Pte.	Charles R. Russell	5th Bn., Norfolk Regt.	16 Nov. 1917	Baghdad War Cemetery
Pte.	Reginald Bevan	7th Bn., Norfolk Regt.	13 Oct. 1915	Loos Memorial
Pte.	Benjamin C. Bray	7th Bn., Norfolk Regt.	13 Oct. 1915	Loos Memorial
Pte.	William J. Vincent	7th Bn., Norfolk Regt.	30 Dec. 1914	St. Mary's Churchyard
Pte.	Arthur J. Mindham	8th Bn., Norfolk Regt.	22 Oct. 1917	Tyne Cot
Pte.	George H. Bedingfield	9th Bn., Norfolk Regt.	15 Apr. 1918	Tyne Cot
Pte.	Reuben K. Bradfield	9th Bn., Norfolk Regt.	8 Oct. 1918	Tincourt Cemetery
Pte.	L. Albert V. Bray	9th Bn., Norfolk Regt.	10 Feb. 1917	Holt Cemetery
Pte.	William H. Chilvers	9th Bn., Norfolk Regt.	5 Mar. 1916	White House Cemetery
Pte.	Arthur Groom	9th Bn., Norfolk Regt.	15 Sep. 1916	Thiepval Memorial
Pte.	J. Norman Smith	1st Bn., Northumberland Fusiliers	22 May 1918	Sandpits Cemetery
Pte.	Harry E. Braybrook	4th Bn., Northumberland Fusiliers	26 Oct. 1917	Tyne Cot
Pte.	Frederick W. A. Graver	51st Bn., Queen's Royal Regiment	10 Aug. 1918	St. Mary's Churchyard
Rfn.	Alfred J. Riches	2/10th Bn., London Regiment	25 Apr. 1918	Pozières Memorial
Rfn.	Ernest G. Barnard	3rd Bn., Rifle Brigade	21 Mar. 1918	Pozières Memorial
Spr.	James Morris	3rd Coy., Royal Engineers	28 Oct. 1915	Helles Memorial

The following names were added after the Second World War:

Rank	Name	Unit	Date of death	Burial/Commemoration
LtCol	Gordon C. Thorne	2nd Bn., Cambridgeshire Regiment	2 Mar. 1942	Kranji War Memorial
FLt.	John Stenton	Royal Air Force	11 Jul. 1945	Kranji War Memorial
2Lt.	Eustace R. Gunther	72 Regt., Royal Artillery	31 Mar. 1940	St. Mary's Churchyard
2Lt.	James B. Jackson	4th/7th Royal Dragoon Guards	21 Aug. 1940	Ipswich Crematorium
PO	F. Caunter-Jackson	No. 61 (Bomber) Squadron RAF	12 Jun. 1941	Runnymede Memorial
PO	George R. Bradfield	No. 86 (Coastal) Squadron RAF	26 Apr. 1945	Runnymede Memorial
FSgt.	L. P. Williamson	Royal Air Force	13 Jul. 1945	All Saints' Churchyard
Sgt.	John G. Taylor	No. 158 (Bomber) Squadron RAF	14 Sep. 1943	St. Mary's Churchyard
Sgt.	Reginald T. Frary	Royal Air Force	14 Aug. 1943	St. Mary's Churchyard
St1C	Edmund G. J. Fowle	Royal Navy	18 Jul. 1943	St. Mary's Churchyard
Cpl.	Owen R. V. Green	287 Coy., Royal Engineers	24 Jun. 1943	Kanchanaburi Cemetery
A2C	Donald A. Barrett	Royal Air Force Volunteer Reserve	8 Jun. 1943	Pioneer Cemetery
Dvr.	Norman W. Johnson	Royal Army Service Corps	4 Oct. 1941	St. Botolph's Churchyard
Dvr.	Ernest W. J. Martins	R.A.S.C.	27 May 1940	Merville Cemetery
Dvr.	Basil V. Riches	R.A.S.C. att. RAMC	16 Jan. 1940	Chambieres Cemetery
Gnr.	George E. Anderson	53 A.A. Regt., Royal Artillery	20 Feb. 1944	Madras War Cemetery
Pte.	Leslie F. Howard	2nd Bn., Cambridgeshire Regiment	3 Sep. 1945	Yokohama War Cemetery
Pte.	H. H. Woodhouse	2nd Bn., Glasgow Highlanders	15 Apr. 1945	Hanover War Cemetery
Pte.	Henry R. J. Bobbins	5th Bn., Royal Norfolk Regiment	2 Jul. 1940	St. Mary's Churchyard
Pte.	William A. Skeat	Pioneer Corps	26 May 1941	St. Mary's Churchyard
Yeo.	Ronald G. Parke	HMS President	19 Oct. 1940	Portsmouth Naval Memorial
RO	Sydney C. Patrick	S.S. Khedive Ismail	12 Feb. 1944	Tower Hill Memorial
Vol.	Sidney Crown	12th Bn., Norfolk Home Guard	29 Jun. 1941	St. Mary's Churchyard

== See also ==
- The River Heacham
- Heacham railway station
- Wild Ken Hill
