= Choseley =

Hamlet and civil parish in Norfolk, England

Coordinates: 52.93533°N 0.59504°E

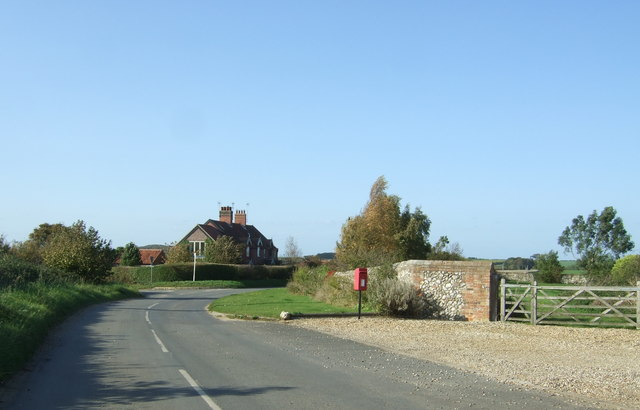

- Location within Norfolk
- Area: 2.75 km^{2} (1.06 sq mi)
- Population: 18
  - Density: 7/km^{2} (18/sq mi)
- OS grid reference: TF745407
- Civil parish: Choseley
- District: King's Lynn and West Norfolk
- Shire county: Norfolk
- Region: East
- Country: England
- Sovereign state: United Kingdom
- Post town: KING'S LYNN
- Postcode district: PE31
- Police: Norfolk
- Fire: Norfolk
- Ambulance: East of England

Choseley is a tiny hamlet and civil parish in the English county of Norfolk. It is situated between the villages of Titchwell and Docking and about 4 kilometres (2.5 mi) from each. The town of Fakenham is 20 km (12 mi) to the south-east, the town of King's Lynn is 25 km (16 mi) to the south-west, and the city of Norwich is 60 km (37 mi) to the south-east.

The villages name means 'Gravelly wood/clearing'.

The civil parish has an area of 2.75 km^{2} (1.06 sq mi) and in the 2001 census had a population of 18 in 10 households. At the 2011 Census the population remained less than 100. For the purposes of local government, the parish falls within the district of King's Lynn and West Norfolk.
