= No. 695 Squadron RAF =

Defunct flying squadron of the Royal Air Force

- Active: 1 December 1943 – 11 February 1949
- Country: United Kingdom
- Branch: Royal Air Force
- Role: Anti-aircraft co-operation
- Part of: No. 70 Group RAF, Air Defense of Great Britain (1943–1944); No. 70 Group RAF, Fighter Command (1944–1949)
- Motto: We Exercise Their Arms

Insignia
- Squadron Badge heraldry: In front of a maunch, three arms in armour conjoined
- Squadron Codes: 4M (December 1943 – February 1949); 8Q (March 1945 – February 1949)

No. 695 Squadron RAF was an anti-aircraft co-operation squadron of the Royal Air Force from 1943 to 1949.

== History ==
The squadron was formed at RAF Bircham Newton, Norfolk, on 1 December 1943, from 1611, 1612 and 1626 (Anti-aircraft co-operation) Flights for anti-aircraft co-operation duties, and operated a variety of aircraft in this role. On 11 August 1945 the squadron moved to RAF Horsham St. Faith, while a detachment served from 27 July 1946 at first from RAF Boxted in Essex and later, between November 1946 and April 1947, from RAF North Weald. The squadron was disbanded on 11 February 1949, when it was renumbered to No. 34 Squadron RAF. That unit took over the aircraft, as well as the squadron codes, 4M and 8Q.

== Aircraft operated ==
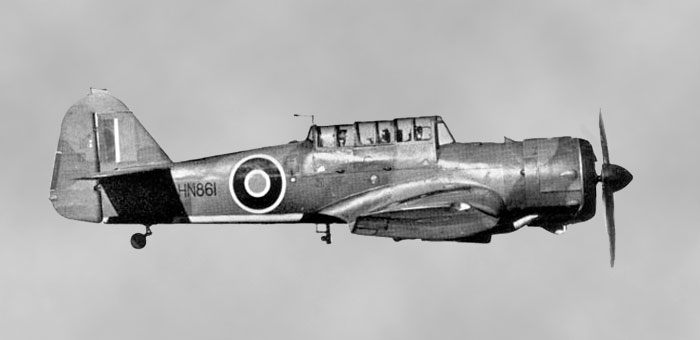
A Miles Martinet such as used by No. 695 Squadron during most of their active service life.

Aircraft operated by No. 695 Squadron RAF
From	To	Aircraft	Version
December 1943	January 1944	Westland Lysander	Mks.I, III
December 1943	June 1944	Hawker Henley	Mk.III
December 1943	May 1945	Miles Martinet	Mk.I
December 1943	September 1945	Hawker Hurricane	Mk.IIc
July 1944	August 1945	Supermarine Spitfire	Mk.Vb
Jan 1945	May 1947	Vultee Vengeance	Mk.IV
July 1945	February 1949	Supermarine Spitfire	F.16
June 1946	February 1949	Airspeed Oxford	T.1, T.2
December 1946	February 1949	Miles Martinet	Mk.I
December 1946	February 1949	North American Harvard	T.2b
December 1948	February 1949	Bristol Beaufighter	TT.10

== Squadron bases ==
Air bases and airfields used by No. 695 Squadron RAF
From	To	Name	Remarks
1 December 1943	11 August 1945	RAF Bircham Newton, Norfolk	Formed here
27 July 1946	1 November 1946	RAF Boxted, Essex	Detachment
1 November 1946	April 1947	RAF North Weald, Essex	Detachment
11 August 1945	11 February 1949	RAF Horsham St Faith, Norfolk	Disbanded here

== See also ==
- List of Royal Air Force aircraft squadrons
