= Bircham, Alberta =

Bircham
- Hamlet
- Location of Bircham Bircham (Canada)
- Coordinates: 51°27′32″N 113°25′51″W
- Country: Canada
- Province: Alberta
- Region: Southern Alberta
- Census division: 5
- Municipal district: Kneehill County

Government
  - Type: Unincorporated
  - Governing body: Kneehill County Council

Area (2021)
  - Land: 0.14 km^{2} (0.054 sq mi)

Population (2021)
  - Total: 5
  - Density: 35.8/km^{2} (93/sq mi)
- Time zone: UTC−06:00 (Alberta Time)
- Area codes: 403, 587, 825

Bircham is a hamlet in southern Alberta, Canada within Kneehill County. It is located approximately 78 km (48 mi) northeast of Calgary and 10 km (6.2 mi) southeast of Acme, along a Canadian National Railway line.

The hamlet most likely takes its name from Bircham in England.

== Demographics ==
Population history of Bircham
Year	Pop.	±%
1991A	6	—
1996	9	+50.0%
2001	10	+11.1%
2006	10	+0.0%
2011	5	−50.0%
2016	5	+0.0%
2021	5	+0.0%
Source: Statistics Canada

In the 2021 Census of Population conducted by Statistics Canada, Bircham had a population of 5 living in 3 of its 3 total private dwellings, a change of 0% from its 2016 population of 5. With a land area of 0.14 km^{2} (0.054 sq mi), it had a population density of 35.7/km^{2} (92.5/sq mi) in 2021.

As a designated place in the 2016 Census of Population conducted by Statistics Canada, Bircham had a population of 5 living in 2 of its 2 total private dwellings, a change of 0% from its 2011 population of 5. With a land area of 0.14 km^{2} (0.054 sq mi), it had a population density of 35.7/km^{2} (92.5/sq mi) in 2016.

== See also ==
- List of communities in Alberta
- List of designated places in Alberta
- List of hamlets in Alberta
