= Tett turret =

Field fortification

Tett Turret
- Deployed throughout the United Kingdom
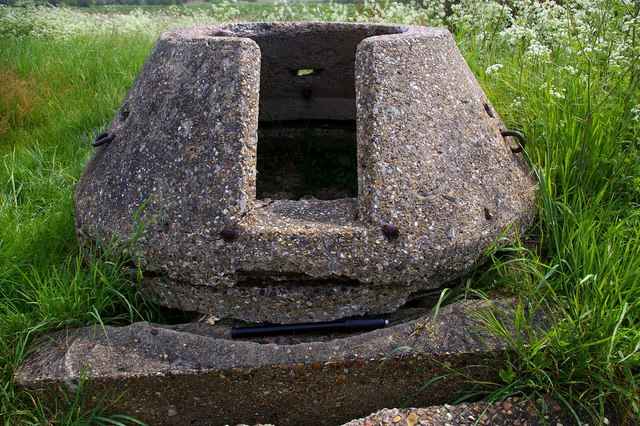
- Surviving Tett Turret at RAF Hornchurch. Light coming through one of several spy-holes can be seen opposite the embrasure.

Site information
- Type: Pillbox

Site history
- In use: Second World War
- Materials: Concrete

Garrison information
- Garrison: 1 or 2

The Tett turret is a type of hardened field fortification built in Britain during the invasion crisis of 1940–1941. It was a small circular pillbox named after its inventor H.L. Tett and manufactured as a private commercial venture by Burbridge Builders Ltd of Surrey. It comprised a revolving concrete turret mounted on a ball race that allowed it to be turned easily. The turret was set above a pit; in early designs, the pit was formed by a standard section of concrete pipe 4 feet (1.2 m) in diameter.

The turret was a 20-inch (50 cm) high truncated cone of reinforced concrete weighing 1,456 pounds (660 kg) with a single embrasure and several spy holes.

The design had a number of advantages. Compared with a conventional pillbox, it used relatively little concrete and steel, it was easy to conceal and being largely prefabricated it could be quickly installed. Because the turrets could be rotated, a group of soldiers in turrets could all bring their weapons to bear on an enemy whereas the same soldiers in a conventional pillbox might only be able to fire from one or two embrasures. In addition, it was relatively cheap at just £18 for the turret assembly [equivalent to £870 in 2025].

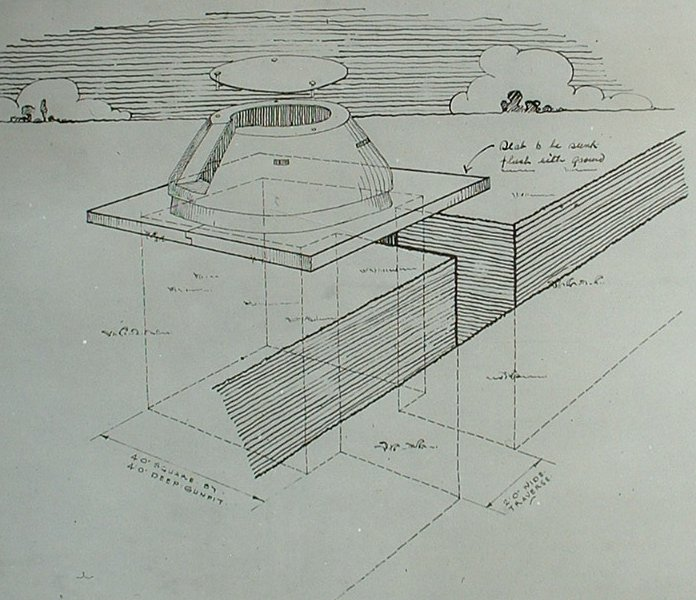
Tett turret accessible via slit trench

However, the War Office judged the Tett turret to be too cramped and not bulletproof against heavy fire, its isolated nature did not allow adequate command and control and the open top was vulnerable to a well-thrown grenade. The most striking feature was that the only way in and out was through the top – there was no way to escape without being exposed to enemy fire – it was to be a fight to the death. Burbridge went back to the drawing board and came up with a new version that instead of being positioned over a pipe was placed on a concrete slab over an underground chamber of brick or concrete slabs. This allowed access from a tunnel or slit trench to the rear. The company's brochure shows a wooden seat suspended from the turret by a metal frame.

Burbridge also proposed that the turret be mounted on improvised armoured vehicles such as the Armadillo and the Bison concrete armoured lorry.

Despite initial enthusiasm by those who saw the design, Burbridge had difficulty getting orders for substantial numbers and consequently, amid wartime shortages and restrictions, could not get even the modest amounts of steel and concrete required to manufacture many turrets. In November 1940, they received an order for just four turrets and even these could not be delivered until February 1941. Eventually, the company manufactured 100 turrets, but only sold 31 of them. Only six sites are recorded in the Defence of Britain database.

Today, extant examples are very rare. Two Tett turrets can easily been seen at RAF Hornchurch which is now Hornchurch Country Park. These known Tett turrets were examined closely for the second series of the BBC programme Two Men in a Trench. During filming, three previously unrecognised turrets were discovered in the undergrowth.

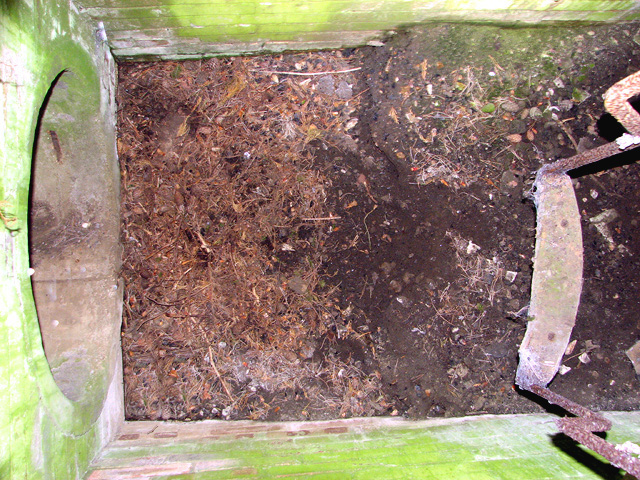
View into a Tett turret. A seat, affixed to the rotating concrete turret, can be seen at right.

Two very well preserved examples have recently been rediscovered at Docking, a village in north-west Norfolk. A very rare if not unique layout links the two turrets with a concrete tunnel about 15 feet long incorporating a spur tunnel that exits the main tunnel at 90 degrees about halfway along its length. Both turrets sit on concrete slabs placed on top of brick walls dug into the ground. The steel seat hangers and wooden seats have also survived.

The turrets differ from the Hornchurch examples in that the gun port is not U-shaped but, rather, the top of the turret is a complete ring of concrete.

The Docking examples are in a remarkable state of preservation, and are currently being investigated by a number of bodies. They are now Grade II listed, as from 2017, as unique examples of anti-invasion defensive structures.

Tett Turrets in Docking, Norfolk, England

Further examples have turned up at Woolmer Green at Hertfordshire, and at North Mymms in the same county.

== See also ==
- British anti-invasion preparations of World War II
- British hardened field defences of World War II
