= Norcon pillbox =

Type of WW2 pillbox

Coordinates: 50°42′19″N 2°16′36″W

- Deployed throughout the United Kingdom
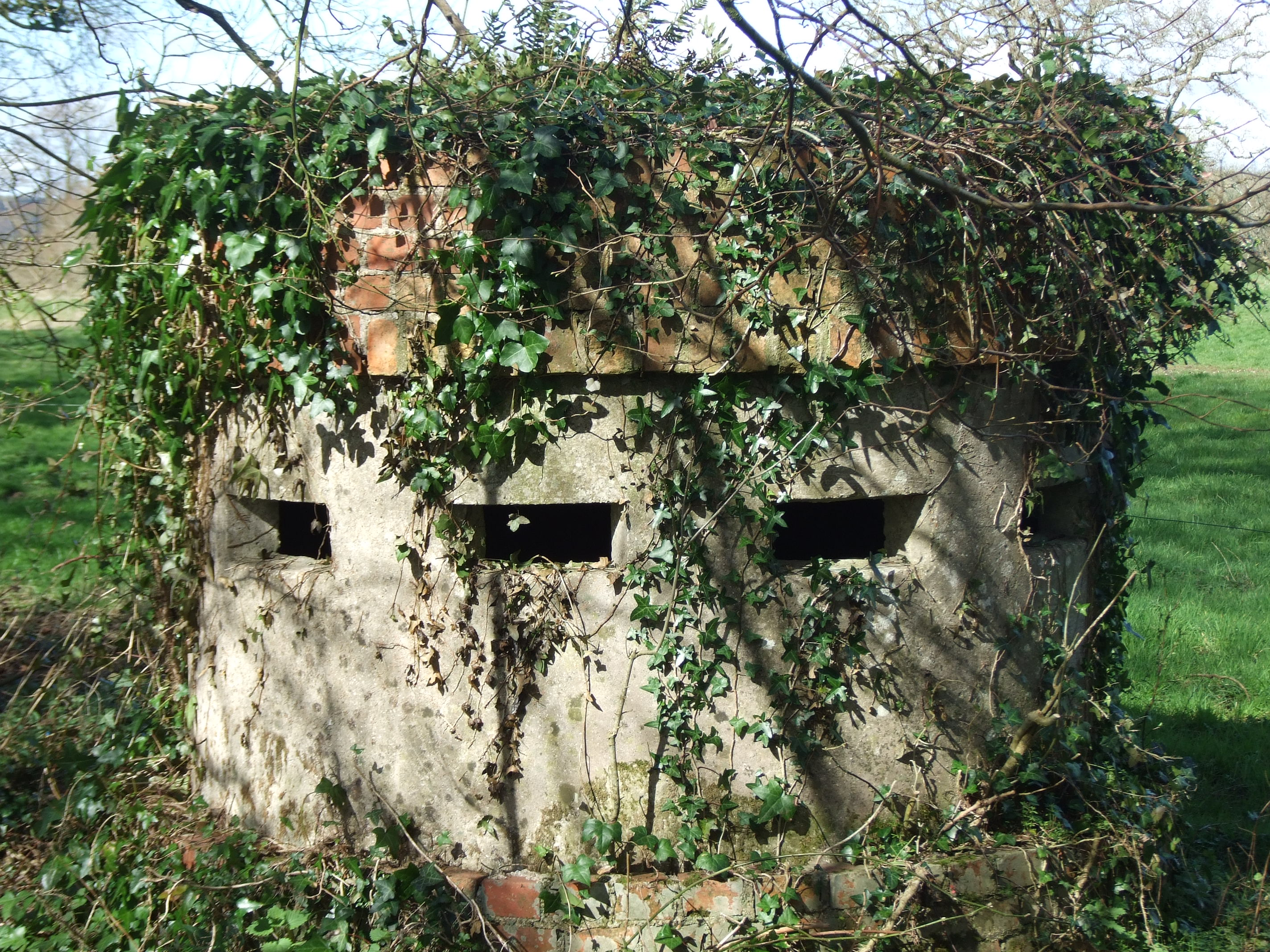
- Extant example of Norcon Pillbox at Moreton Ford, near Weymouth, Dorset. SY805895.

Site information
- Type: Pillbox

Site history
- In use: Second World War
- Materials: Concrete

The Norcon pillbox is a type of hardened field fortification built in Britain during the invasion crisis of 1940–1941. It was a small circular pillbox named after the company that manufactured it as a private commercial venture.

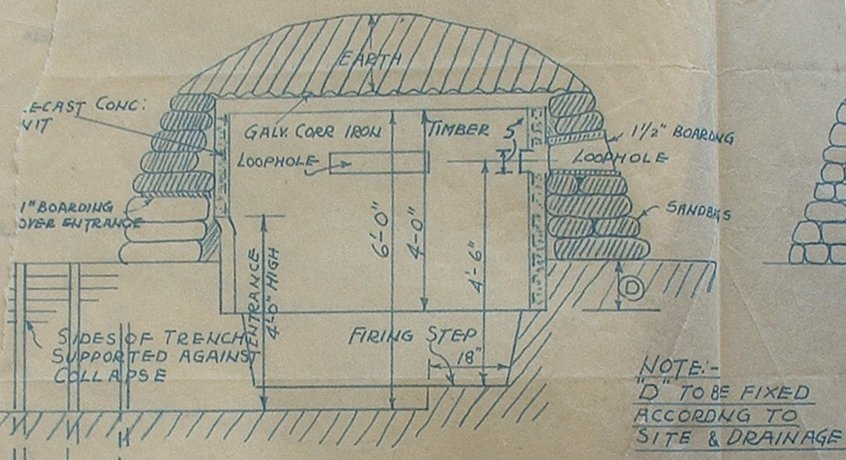
Norcon blueprint: section

The Norcon pillbox was made from a concrete pipe 6 feet (1.8 m) diameter and 4 feet (1.2 m) high; the walls were 4 inches (10 cm) of non-reinforced concrete with several cut loopholes. The pipe would be sunk into the ground over a pit that would provide a total of 6 feet (1.8 m) headroom. The standard model had a roof made of timber, corrugated iron, and earth. Some installations were fitted with a concrete roof, others had no roof at all. The walls were given extra protection by a layer of sandbags. The exit may be via an open roof, through a hatch in the roof or through a low entrance cut into the pipe to a slit trench.

Norcon was not the only company to design a defence made from pipes. A similar design was the Croft pillbox developed by the Croft Granite, Brick and Concrete Company. However, the Norcon was by far the most common and gave its name to the general type.

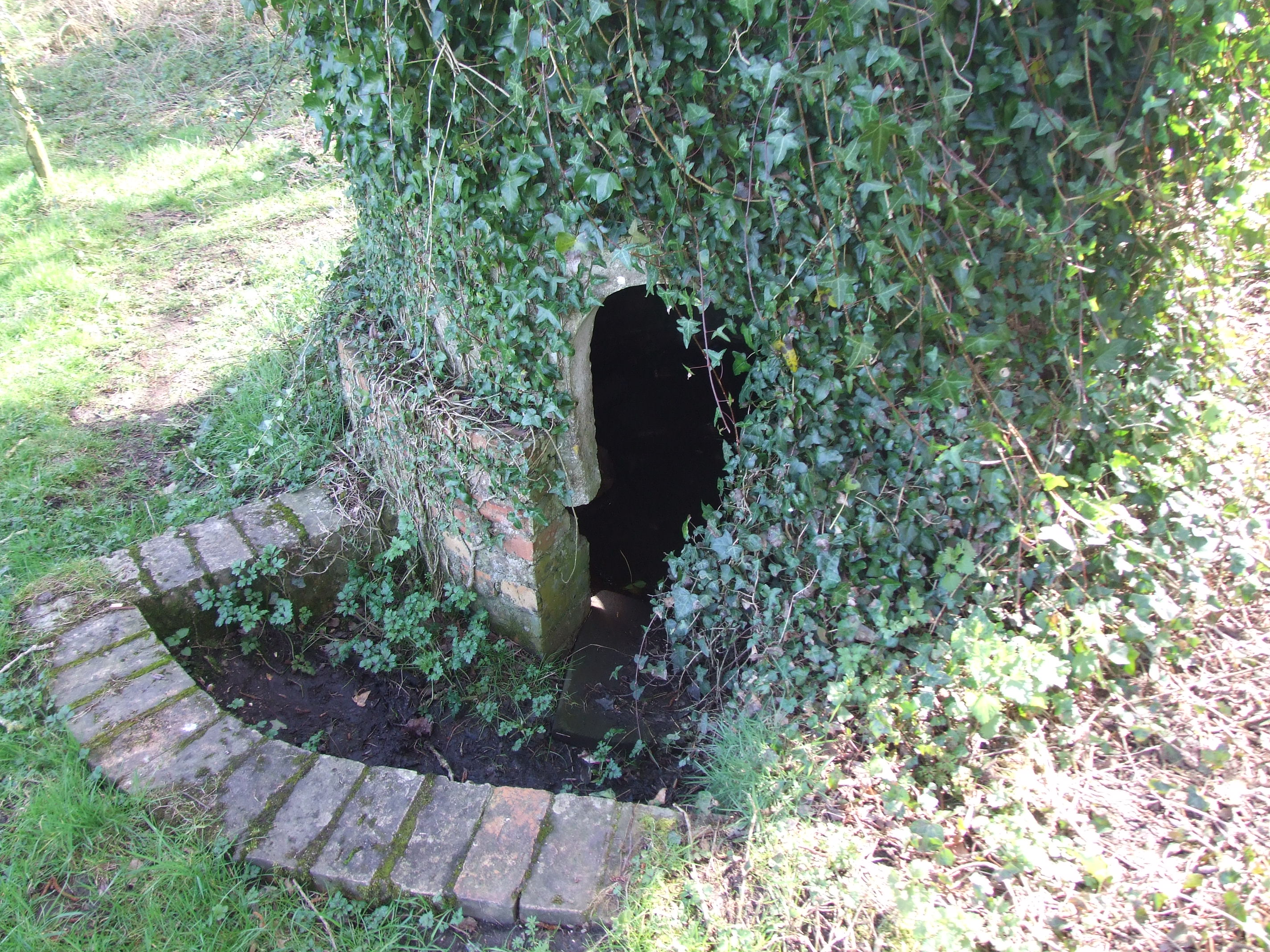
Entrance

Norcon Ltd was a small company specialising in the manufacture of large spun concrete pipes. In 1938, looking for new ways to market their products, the company experimented with producing air raid shelters. Although this venture does not appear to have been very successful, at least one very small and cramped Norcon shelter has recently been found.

In July 1940, as Norcons were being installed, one officer raised concerns after one pipe section had broken while being rolled into position and an installed Norcon had not stood up well to a concentrated burst of machine gun fire. Concerns of these sorts have understandably led to the Norcon being regarded as "possibly the most dangerous, cheap and nasty of all pillbox designs"; certainly, it cannot have offered the protection equivalent to a conventional reinforced concrete pillbox, but according to the Chief Engineer of Eastern Command "it would appear to be considerably better than many sandbag emplacements under construction."

The pipe was made from a high alumina fondue cement which set quickly, making it possible to turn out about 20 units a day. Also, the fondue cement cured quickly reaching a strength in 24 hours for which Portland cement required 28 days. Although relatively few were actually built, Norcons were found all over the United Kingdom, from southwest England to the Orkney Islands. Twenty-seven Norcon pillbox sites are recorded in the Defence of Britain database.

Holding company Bowmaker purchased a controlling interest in Norcon Limited in 1943 and Norcon managed to show a profit; the company prospered after the end of hostilities.

== See also ==
- British anti-invasion preparations of World War II
- British hardened field defences of World War II
