= Bircham International University =

Unaccredited distance education university

- Motto: A good education should teach HOW to think, not WHAT to think
- Type: Distance learning for adults.
- Established: 1992
- President: Deric Bircham
- Vice-president: Laurence Cheng Wen
- CEO: William Martin
- Location: Madrid, Spain
- Website: www.bircham.edu www.bircham.edu.es www.bircham.edu.pt
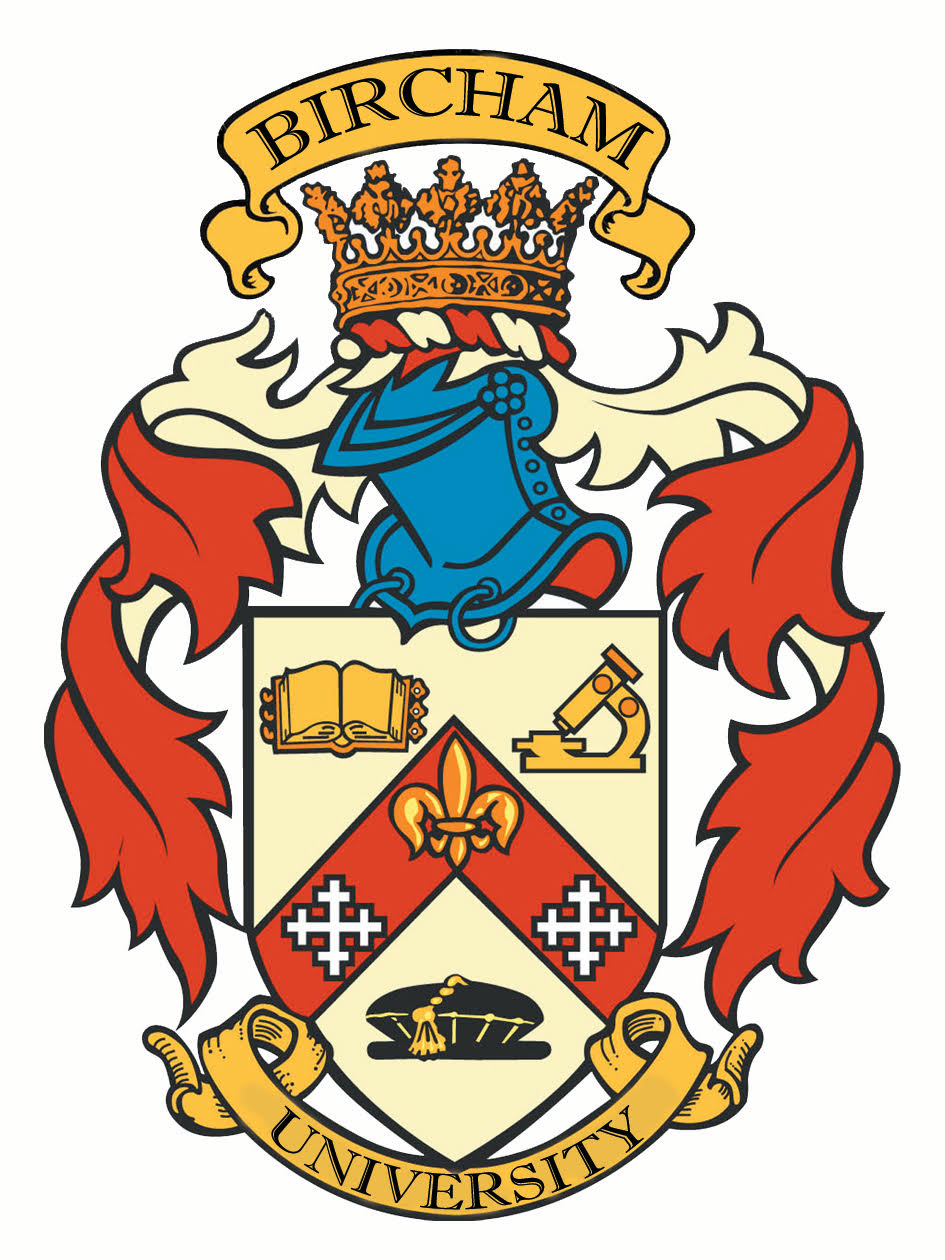

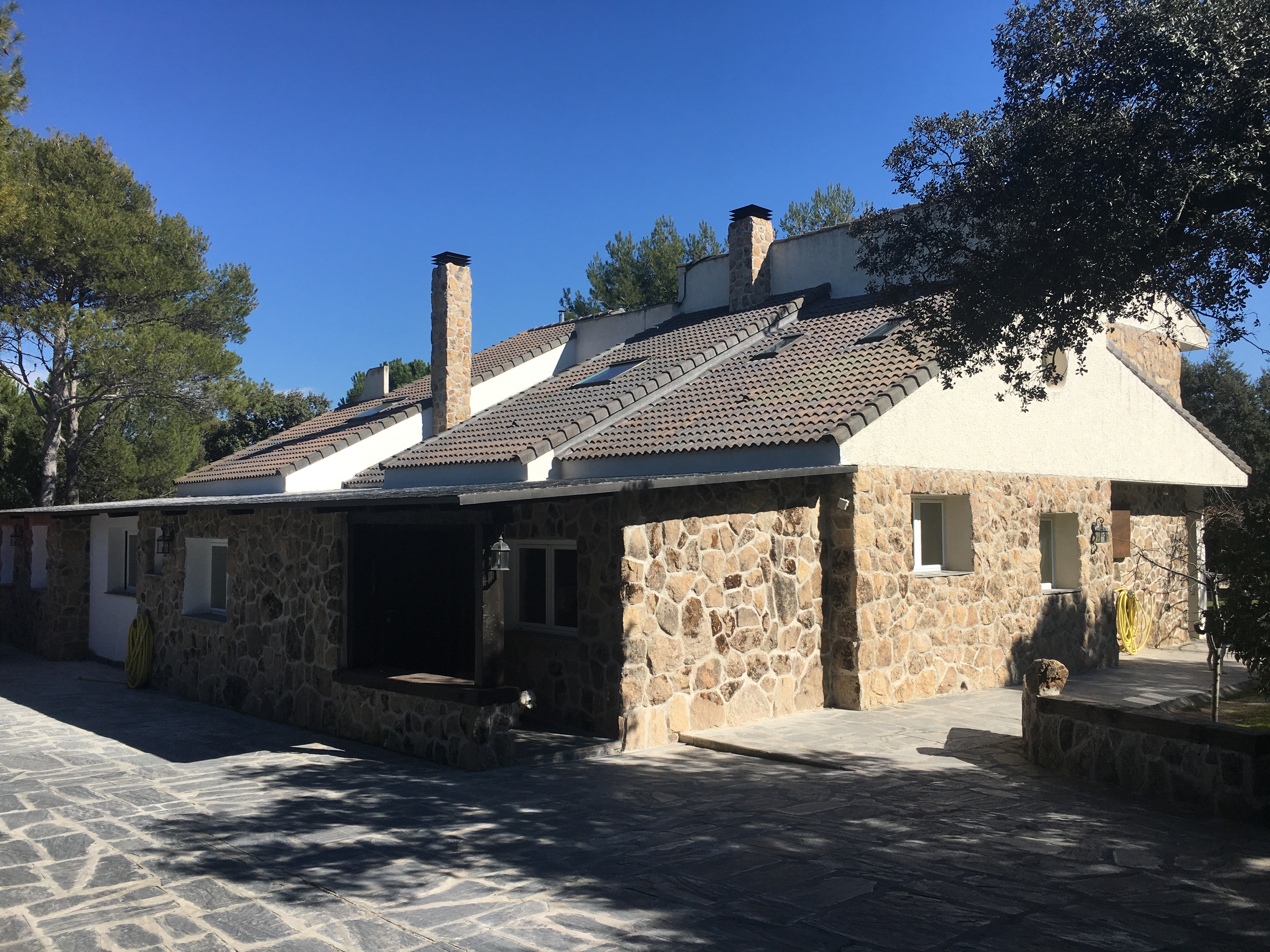
Bircham International University office in Madrid

Bircham International University is an institution of distance-learning higher education for adults and professionals.

== History and location ==
BIU was founded by Deric Bircham, William Martin, and Bircham's adopted son, Laurence Cheng Wen. According to its website, Bircham was established in Europe in 1992. It is registered in Delaware (United States), Spain, and formerly operated from the Bahamas.

John Bear, authority on distance education, wrote in the 2003 edition of Bears' Guide to Earning Degrees by Distance Learning: 'Bachelor’s, Master’s, Doctorates Degrees by correspondence at all levels in business, arts, health, psychology, engineering, computers and science. Bircham's listed "delegation addresses [are] in Spain, England, United States (a Mail Boxes Etc. in Miami, Florida), Bahamas, Taiwan, China, Mexico, Argentina, Venezuela, Ecuador, Peru, Bolivia, Columbia, and New Zealand." Bear's Guide states that "the offices in England and the Bahamas were strictly administrative and did not serve students."

Bircham acquired Oxford International College in 2000.

== Accreditation status ==
BIU's website presents a list of accreditations and memberships. As of 2013, none of them were from an educational accreditation body recognized by the countries where it operates.

BIU describes itself as a practitioner of non-formal education. While it operates legally under Spanish law, it is not formally recognized by the Ministry of Education of Spain. As a result, its degrees and credits might not be acceptable to employers or other institutions. Use of its degree titles may be illegal in some jurisdictions, such as Texas.

Sources explicitly listing Bircham as "unaccredited" include the Texas Higher Education Coordinating Board, which state that Bircham has "No degree-granting authority from Spain (American Association of Collegiate Registrars and Admissions Officers [AACRAO] evaluation)." and the former Oregon Office of Degree Authorization which considered BIU a unaccredited foreign degree supplier.

In 2018 Bircham obtained a charter from the Ministry of Education in Curaçao, and the Education Quality Certification from the United States Distance Learning Association.

In July 2026, BIU received institutional accreditation from the Independent Institute of Accreditation, Rating and Certification (IARC), an accreditation agency based in Kyrgyzstan and a member of the International Network for Quality Assurance Agencies in Higher Education (INQAAHE).

== Reception ==
In July 2007, the Secretariat of Public Education (SEP) of Mexico issued a notice stating that degrees lacking RVOE (Official Recognition from the Mexican Government) will not be validated by the SEP. Degrees via online or distance learning issued by foreign institutions like Bircham University will not be recognized by the SEP.

In April 2008, the Nairobi Business Daily reported that Bircham International University was operating in Kenya without authorization. In March 2010, the same newspaper published a correction, stating that BIU "is a Spanish institution of distance learning and is in good standing with Spanish authorities that offer alternatives to formal adult higher education specifically aimed at adult working professionals" and that its programs "can be legalized and validated by the Embassy of Kenya in the USA or Spain despite the institution not being registered by the Commission for Higher Education in Kenya". An official of Kenya's Commission for Higher Education was quoted as warning that BIU degree certificates would not be recognized. In 2013, BIU directors state that BIU does not have any presence in Kenya nor any collaboration with other any college or educational institution in Kenya.

In 2013, health fraud activist Stephen Barrett conducted a review concluding: "BIU offers what amounts to supervised textbook reading plus credentials that suggest bearers have considerably more formal education and expertise than they actually have. The requirements for its degrees are much less than those of universities accredited by CHEA-recognized agencies. Most of BIU's teachings are straightforward, but some promote pseudoscientific concepts and practices. None of its health-related programs—by themselves—provide an adequate basis for clinical practice."
