= Fring, Norfolk =

Village in Norfolk, England

Coordinates: 52.881562°N 0.581074°E

Fring
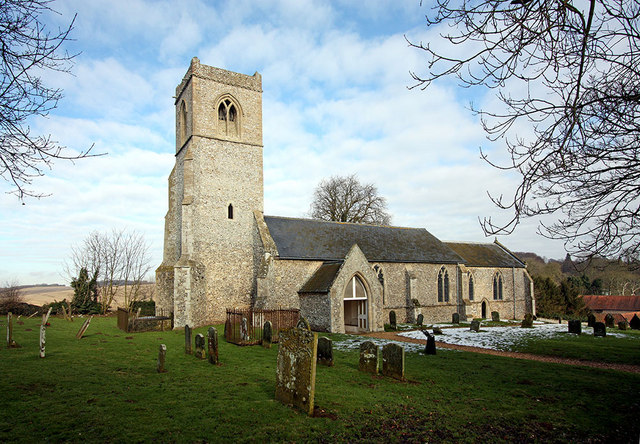
- All Saints Church, Fring

- Location within Norfolk
- Area: 2.68 sq mi (6.9 km^{2})
- OS grid reference: TF737346
- Civil parish: Fring
- District: King's Lynn and West Norfolk
- Shire county: Norfolk
- Region: East
- Country: England
- Sovereign state: United Kingdom
- Post town: KING'S LYNN
- Postcode district: PE31
- Dialling code: 01485
- Police: Norfolk
- Fire: Norfolk
- Ambulance: East of England
- UK Parliament: North West Norfolk

Fring is a village and civil parish in the English county of Norfolk.

Fring is located 11 miles (18 km) north-east of King's Lynn and 35 miles (56 km) north-west of Norwich, at the source of the River Heacham.

== History ==
Fring's name is of Anglo-Saxon origin and derives from the Old English for Frea's place.

In the Domesday Book, Fring is listed as a settlement of 74 households in the hundred of Docking. In 1086, the village was divided between the East Anglian estates of Eustace, Count of Boulogne, William de Warenne and William d'Ecouis, Bishop of Thetford.

A Roman road once passed through Fring.

Fring Hall was built in the Nineteenth Century and was further re-built, after a fire, in the Twentieth Century. It is likely that Fring Hall was used by the military during the Second World War.

== Geography ==
Due to its small size, Fring's population statistics have been combined with nearby Sedgeford for recent censuses.

Fring is the traditional source of the River Heacham.

== All Saints' Church ==
Fring's parish church dates from the Fourteenth Century, is located on Sedgeford Road and has been Grade II listed since 1953. All Saints' remains open most Sundays for church services.

All Saints' features a large Norman font and a stained-glass window depicting the Crucifixion, designed by Maille & Son.

== Governance ==
Fring is part of the electoral ward of Heacham for local elections and is part of the district of King's Lynn and West Norfolk.

The village's national constituency is North West Norfolk which has been represented by the Conservative's James Wild MP since 2019.

== War Memorial ==
Fring War Memorial is a grey granite wheel-headed cross located in All Saints' Churchyard. The memorial lists the following names for the First World War:

Rank	Name	Unit	Date of death	Burial/Commemoration
2Lt.	Richard E. Dusgate	No. 46 Squadron RFC	19 Dec. 1917	Valenciennes Cemetery
Sgt.	Herbert Meek	6th Bn., Royal Dublin Fusiliers	17 Oct. 1918	Saint-Souplet Cemetery
LCpl.	Charles Wright	2/4th Bn., K.O.Y.L.I.	29 Mar. 1918	Gézaincourt Cemetery
Pte.	Norman Farthing	8th Bn., Border Regiment	5 Jul. 1916	Lonsdale Cemetery
Pte.	Albert Steward	1st Bn., Norfolk Regiment	21 Apr. 1915	Menin Gate
Pte.	Clarence Spooner	1/5th Bn., Norfolk Regt.	19 Apr. 1917	Jerusalem Memorial
