= Bircham =

Civil parish in Norfolk, England

Coordinates: 52.86°N 0.63°E

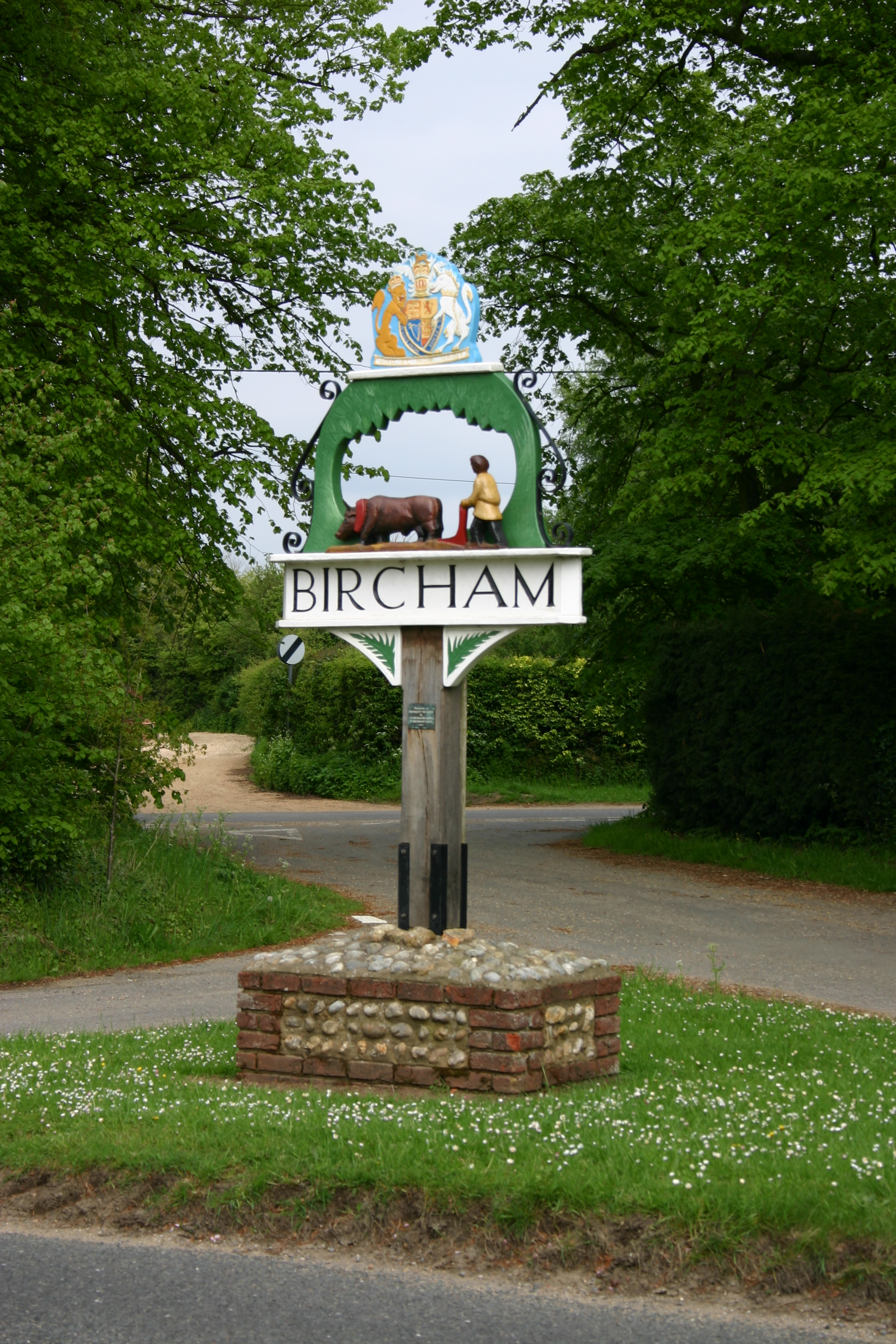
- Bircham Village Sign

- Location within Norfolk
- Area: 9.58 km^{2} (3.70 sq mi)
- Population: 448 (2011)
  - Density: 47/km^{2} (120/sq mi)
- OS grid reference: TF773327
- Civil parish: Bircham
- District: King's Lynn and West Norfolk
- Shire county: Norfolk
- Region: East
- Country: England
- Sovereign state: United Kingdom
- Post town: KING'S LYNN
- Postcode district: PE31
- Police: Norfolk
- Fire: Norfolk
- Ambulance: East of England

Bircham is a civil parish in the English county of Norfolk. It includes the villages of Great Bircham, Bircham Newton, and Bircham Tofts. The parish is located about 12 miles (19 km) north-east of the town of King's Lynn and 37 miles (60 km) north-west of the city of Norwich.

== Geography ==
The civil parish has an area of 24.82 square kilometres (9.58 sq mi) and at the 2011 census had a population of 448 in 202 households. For the purposes of local government, the parish falls within the district of King's Lynn and West Norfolk.
