= Bircham Newton =

Village in Norfolk, England

Coordinates: 52.873°N 0.625°E

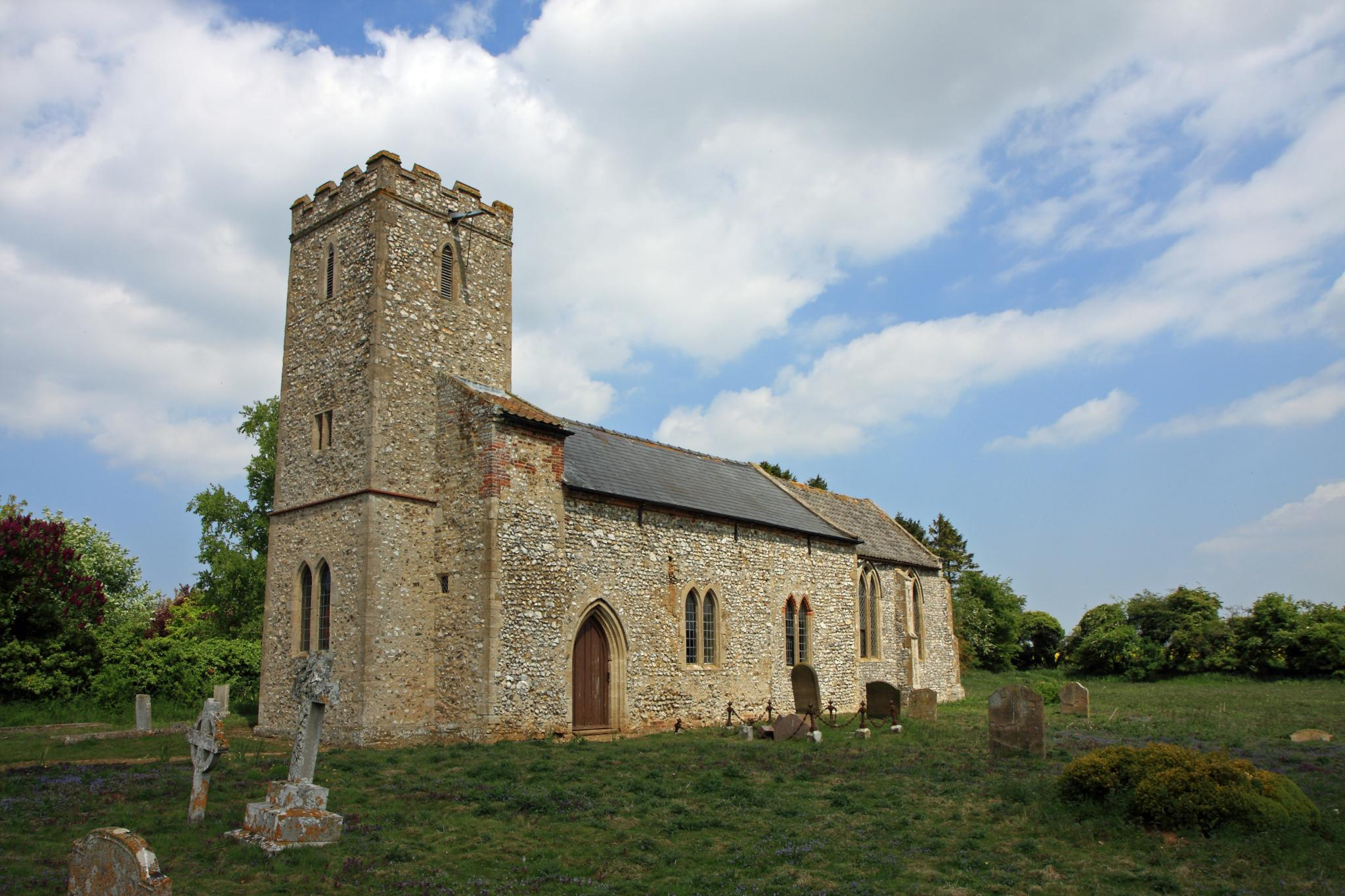
- All Saints, Bircham Newton

- Location within Norfolk
- OS grid reference: TF768338
- Civil parish: Bircham
- District: King's Lynn and West Norfolk
- Shire county: Norfolk
- Region: East
- Country: England
- Sovereign state: United Kingdom
- Post town: King's Lynn
- Postcode district: PE31
- Dialling code: 01485
- UK Parliament: North West Norfolk

Bircham Newton is a village in the civil parish of Bircham, in the King's Lynn and West Norfolk district of the county of Norfolk, England. It is located 0.7 miles (1.1 km) north of Great Bircham, 13 miles (21 km) north-east of King's Lynn and 33 miles (53 km) north-west of Norwich.

== History ==
The village name is of Anglo-Saxon origin. It is listed in the Domesday Book as a settlement of 19 households in the hundred of Docking. In 1086, Bircham Newton was part of the estates of Ralph de Beaufour.

== Geography ==
The village is located along the B1153 road, which runs between Narborough and Brancaster. At the 1931 census it had a population of 487. This was the last time separate population statistics were collected for Bircham Newton and on 1 April 1935 the parish was merged with Great Bircham and Bircham Tofts to form the civil parish of Bircham.

== All Saints' church ==
The former parish church is dedicated to All Saints and dates from the 12th-century. The church was gently restored in 1858. Inside the building there are a set of royal arms from the reign of George III and a memorial to John James Stephens Ward, a grandson of Horatio Nelson.

== RAF Bircham Newton ==
In 1916, land close to Bircham Newton was developed into a base for the Royal Flying Corps during the First World War. The base was used during the inter-war period and during the Second World War as a base for RAF Coastal Command. From 1966 until 2020 the airfield was the home of the Construction Industry Training Board. In February 2020, the CITB announced it had sold its training provision to West Suffolk College, based in Bury St Edmunds, aiming to continue construction industry training provision at the site.

== Governance ==
Bircham Newton is part of the electoral ward of Bircham with Ruddhams for local elections and is part of the district of King's Lynn and West Norfolk. It is within the North West Norfolk parliamentary constituency.
