= RAF Bircham Newton =

Former Royal Air Force station in Norfolk, England

RAF Bircham Newton
- Near Bircham Newton, Norfolk in England

Site information
- Type: Royal Air Force station
- Owner: Ministry of Defence
- Operator: Royal Air Force
- Controlled by: RAF Coastal Command * No. 16 Group RAF

Location
- Shown within Norfolk RAF Bircham Newton (the United Kingdom)
- Coordinates: 52°52′37″N 000°39′09″E

Site history
- Built: 1916, 1938
- In use: 1918-1966
- Battles/wars: European theatre of World War II; Cold War

Airfield information
- Elevation: 70 metres (230 ft) AMSL
Runways
Direction	Length and surface
00/00	Sommerfeld tracking
00/00	Sommerfeld tracking
00/00	Sommerfeld tracking

Royal Air Force Bircham Newton or more simply RAF Bircham Newton is a former Royal Air Force station located 2 miles (3.2 km) south east of Docking, Norfolk and 13.4 miles (21.6 km) north east of King's Lynn, Norfolk, England.

== History ==
The site was first used during the First World War and received the largest British bomber of the time, the Handley Page V/1500. They would have carried out bombing missions against Berlin but the Armistice was arranged before any missions were actually flown.

There were several communication squadrons active at the airfield during 1919.

The airfield was equipped with one aircraft repair shed and three double bay general service sheds, although these had been demolished by 1937. It had two Belfast hangars, three C Type hangars, three Bellman hangars and ten Blister hangars.

It operated through the Second World War as part of No. 16 Group RAF as part of RAF Coastal Command.

No. 206 Squadron RAF was one of the squadrons being based there, on maritime patrol duties. Two satellite airfields, RAF Docking and RAF Langham were opened to accommodate units.

In 1965 the airfield was used for evaluation trials of the Hawker Siddeley Kestrel V/STOL aircraft.

== Squadrons ==
First World War and Inter war years

- No. 7 Squadron RAF 1923–1927 Vickers Vimy, Vickers Virginia.
- No. 11 Squadron RAF 1923–1924 de Havilland DH.9A, Fairey Fawn.
- No. 18 Squadron RAF 1936 Hawker Hart, Hawker Hind.
- No. 21 Squadron RAF 1935–1936 Hawker Hind.
- No. 34 Squadron RAF 1935–1936 Hawker Hind.
- No. 35 (Madras Presidency) Squadron RAF 1929–1935 Fairey IIIF, Fairey Gordon.
- No. 39 Squadron RAF 1928 de Havilland DH.9A.
- No. 49 Squadron RAF 1936 Hawker Hind.
- No. 60 Squadron RAF 1920 cadre for disbandment.
- No. 90 Squadron RAF 1928 Bristol Blenheim.
- No. 99 Squadron RAF 1924–1928 Aldershot, Vickers Vimy, Handley Page Hyderabad.
- No. 101 Squadron RAF 1928–1929 Boulton Paul Sidestrand, de Havilland DH.9.
- No. 166 Squadron RAF 1918–1919 Handley Page V/1500.
- No. 167 Squadron RAF 1918–1919 Handley Page V/1500.
- No. 207 Squadron RAF 1920–1922 de Havilland DH.9A and 1929–1935 Fairey IIIF, Gordon.
- No. 220 Squadron RAF 1936–1939 Avro Anson.
- No. 269 Squadron RAF 1936 Avro Anson.
- No. 274 Squadron RAF 1919–1920 Handley Page V/1500.
- No. 5 (Communication) Squadron RAF (March – June 1919)
- No. 6 (Communication) Squadron RAF (March – October 1919)
- No. 7 (Communication) Squadron RAF (March 1919 – 1 October 1919)
- No. 8 (Communication) Squadron RAF (March 1919 – September 1919)

Second World War

- No. 42 Squadron RAF 1939–1940 Vickers Vildebeest.
- No. 53 Squadron RAF 1941 Lockheed Hudson.
- No. 119 Squadron RAF 1945 Fairey Swordfish.
- No. 200 Squadron RAF 1941 Lockheed Hudson.
- No. 206 Squadron RAF 1926–1941 Avro Anson, Lockheed Hudson.
- No. 221 Squadron RAF 1940–1941 Vickers Wellington.
- No. 229 Squadron RAF 1940 detachment Hawker Hurricane.
- No. 233 Squadron RAF 1944 Lockheed Hudson.
- No. 235 Squadron RAF 1940–1941 Bristol Blenheim.
- No. 248 Squadron RAF 1941 Bristol Blenheim.
- No. 252 Squadron RAF 1940 re-formed and moved to RAF Chivenor to operate the Bristol Blenheim.
- No. 254 Squadron RAF 1940 Bristol Blenheim.
- No. 279 Squadron RAF 1941–1944 Lockheed Hudson.
- No. 280 Squadron RAF 1942–1943 Avro Anson.
- No. 320 (Netherlands) Squadron RAF 1942 Lockheed Hudson.
- No. 407 Squadron RCAF 1942 Lockheed Hudson.
- No. 415 Squadron RCAF 1943–1944 Vickers Wellington.
- No. 500 (County of Kent) Squadron AAF 1941–1942 Bristol Blenheim, Lockheed Hudson.
- No. 502 (Ulster) Squadron AAF 1942 Armstrong Whitworth Whitley.
- No. 521 Squadron RAF 1942–1943 various types.
- No. 524 Squadron RAF 1944–1945 Vickers Wellington.
- No. 598 Squadron RAF 1945 various types.
- No. 695 Squadron RAF 1943–1945 various types.

Royal Navy

- 811 Naval Air Squadron
- 812 Naval Air Squadron
- 815 Naval Air Squadron
- 816 Naval Air Squadron
- 819 Naval Air Squadron
- 826 Naval Air Squadron
- 855 Naval Air Squadron

== Units ==
- 'B' Flight of Anti-Aircraft Co-operation Unit RAF (June – September 1936)
- No. 3 School of Aerial Fighting & Gunnery RAF (May 1918) became No. 3 Fighting School RAF (May – November 1918)
- 'B' Flight of No. 1 Anti-Aircraft Co-operation Unit RAF (1 AACU) (February – May 1937 & September 1937 – April 1938)
- 'C' Flight of No. 1 AACU (May – September 1938 & April – September 1939)
- 'D' Flight of No. 1 AACU (April – September 1938 & April – September 1939)

Second World War and Cold War

- 'K' Flight of No. 1 AACU (September 1940 – December 1941) became No. 1611 (Anti-Aircraft Co-operation) Flight RAF
- 'M' Flight of No. 1 AACU (September – October 1940)
- No. 2 Armament Practice Camp RAF
- No. 2 General Reconnaissance Unit RAF (March – May 1940)
- No. 7 Anti-Aircraft Co-operation Unit RAF (March – May 1943)
- No. 18 (RCAF) Air Crew Holding Unit
- No. 27 Air Crew Holding Unit
- Detachment of No. 54 Maintenance Unit RAF (June 1943)
- No. 157 (General Reconnaissance) Wing RAF (October 1944 and May 1945)
- No. 1401 Meteorological Flight RAF (October 1941 – August 1942)
- No. 403 Meteorological Flight RAF (November 1910 – March 1941) became No. 1403 Meteorological Flight RAF (March 1941 – February 1942)
- No. 1525 (Beam Approach Training) Flight RAF (July 1942 – June 1945)
- No. 1555 (Radio Aids Training) Flight RAF (March – August 1947)
- No. 1559 (Radio Aids Training) Flight RAF (March – August 1947)
- No. 1612 (Anti-Aircraft Co-operation) Flight RAF (December 1942 – December 1943)
- No. 1626 (Anti-Aircraft Co-operation) Flight RAF (November – December 1943)
- No. 2743 Squadron RAF Regiment
- No. 2749 Squadron RAF Regiment
- No. 2765 Squadron RAF Regiment
- Air Crew Allocation Centre
- Coastal Command Preparation Pool RAF (June 1944 – August 1945)
- Officers Advanced Training School RAF (October 1948 – 1962)
- Transport Command Initial Conversion Unit RAF (October 1946 – September 1948)
- Warwick Training Unit RAF (July – October 1943) became Air Sea Rescue Training Unit RAF (October 1943)

== Current use ==
After closure as an operational airfield in 1966, the airfield became the home of the Construction Industry Training Board. The area of the airfield once occupied by the grass runways has disappeared under the activities of construction equipment, but the majority of buildings on the site remain in use by the CITB. The control tower was demolished in 2010 due to its poor condition.

In February 2020, the CITB announced it had sold the site to West Suffolk College, based in Bury St Edmunds, aiming to continue construction industry training provision at Bircham Newton. Later in 2020, CITB decided not to continue with the sale of Bircham Newton to WSC but to remain a provider of Apprenticeship and Commercial Training for the Construction Industry, where it continues to this day.

== See also ==
- List of Norfolk airfields
- List of former Royal Air Force stations
