= Great Bircham =

Village in Norfolk, England

Coordinates: 52.861°N 0.625°E

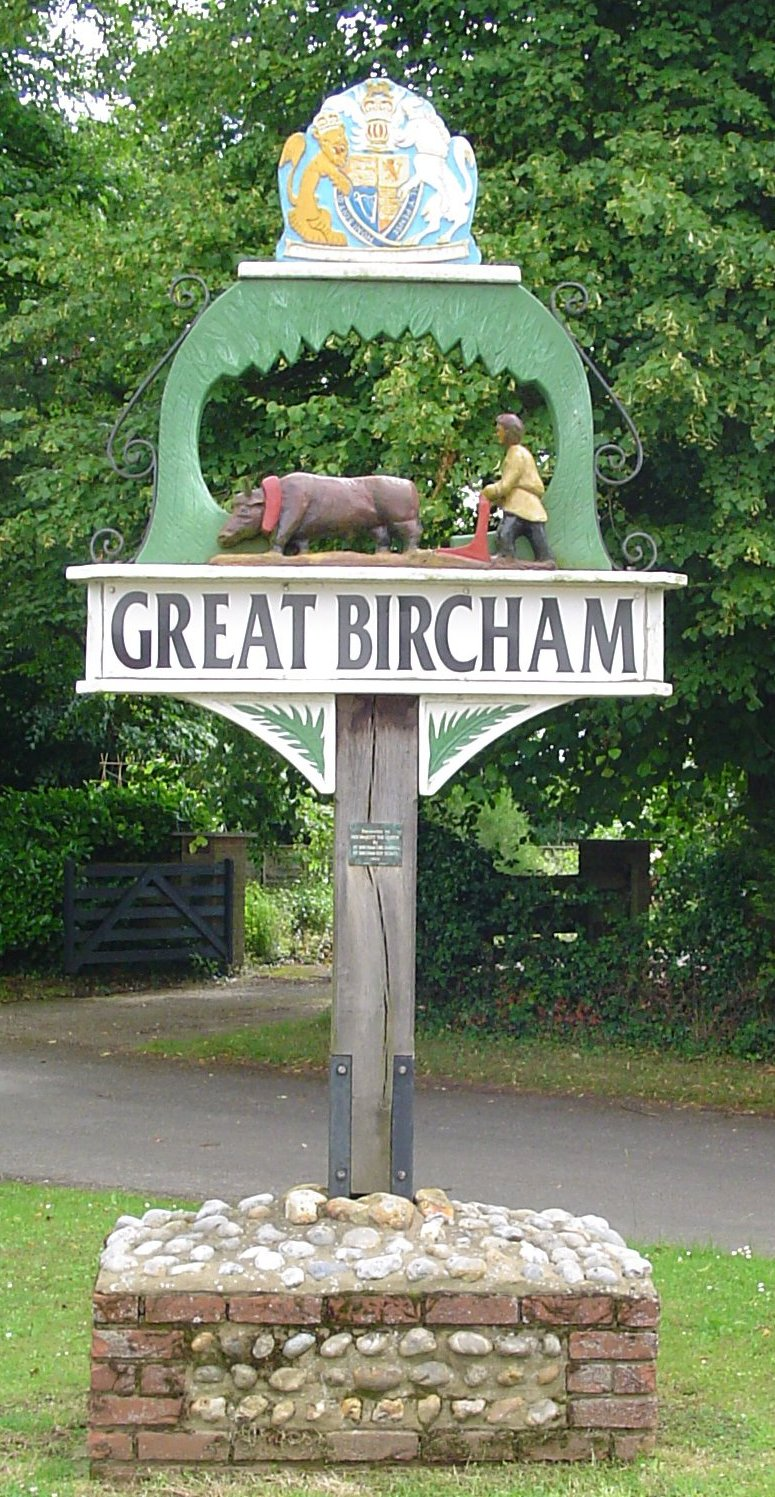
- Signpost in Great Bircham

- Location within Norfolk
- OS grid reference: TF768325
- Civil parish: Bircham
- District: King's Lynn and West Norfolk
- Shire county: Norfolk
- Region: East
- Country: England
- Sovereign state: United Kingdom
- Post town: King's Lynn
- Postcode district: PE31
- Dialling code: 01485
- UK Parliament: North West Norfolk

Great Bircham is a village, part of the civil parish of Bircham, in the King's Lynn and West Norfolk district, in the English county of Norfolk. It is 12 miles (19 km) north-east of the town of King's Lynn, and 38 miles (61 km) north-west of the city of Norwich.

== History ==
The village's name is of Anglo-Saxon origin and it is listed in the Domesday Book as a settlement of 21 households in the hundred of Docking. In 1086, Bircham Newton was part of the estates of Ralph de Beaufour and William d'Ecouis.

In 1740, the common land in Great Bircham was subject to enclosure.

Great Bircham Windmill was built in 1846 by George Humphrey and was restored in 1977. The mill remains open to visitors today.

In 1931 the parish had a population of 327. This was the last time separate population statistics were collected for Great Bircham and on 1 April 1935 the parish was abolished to form part of the parish of Bircham.

== St. Mary's church ==
Great Bircham's church is dedicated to Saint Mary and dates mainly from the 14th-century. The building is Grade I listed.

== Governance ==
Great Bircham is part of the electoral ward of Bircham with Ruddhams for local elections and is part of the district of King's Lynn and West Norfolk. It is part of the North West Norfolk parliamentary constituency.
