= Ballykelly =

Ballykelly may refer to:

== Places ==
- Ballykelly, County Londonderry, a village in Northern Ireland
- Ballykelly, County Down, a townland in County Down, Northern Ireland
- Ballykelly, County Antrim, a townland in County Antrim, Northern Ireland
- Ballykelly, County Kildare, a village in County Kildare, Ireland
- Ballykelly, the name of several townlands in County Wexford, Ireland; see List of townlands of County Wexford

== Other ==
- RAF Ballykelly, a former Royal Air Force station in Ballykelly, County Londonderry; closed in 1971
- RNAS Ballykelly (HMS Sealion), a former Royal Naval Air Station near Ballykelly, County Londonderry, Northern Ireland
- Shackleton Barracks, a former military installation at Ballykelly, County Londonderry, Northern Ireland
