= 745 Naval Air Squadron =

Inactive flying squadron of the Royal Navy's Fleet Air Arm

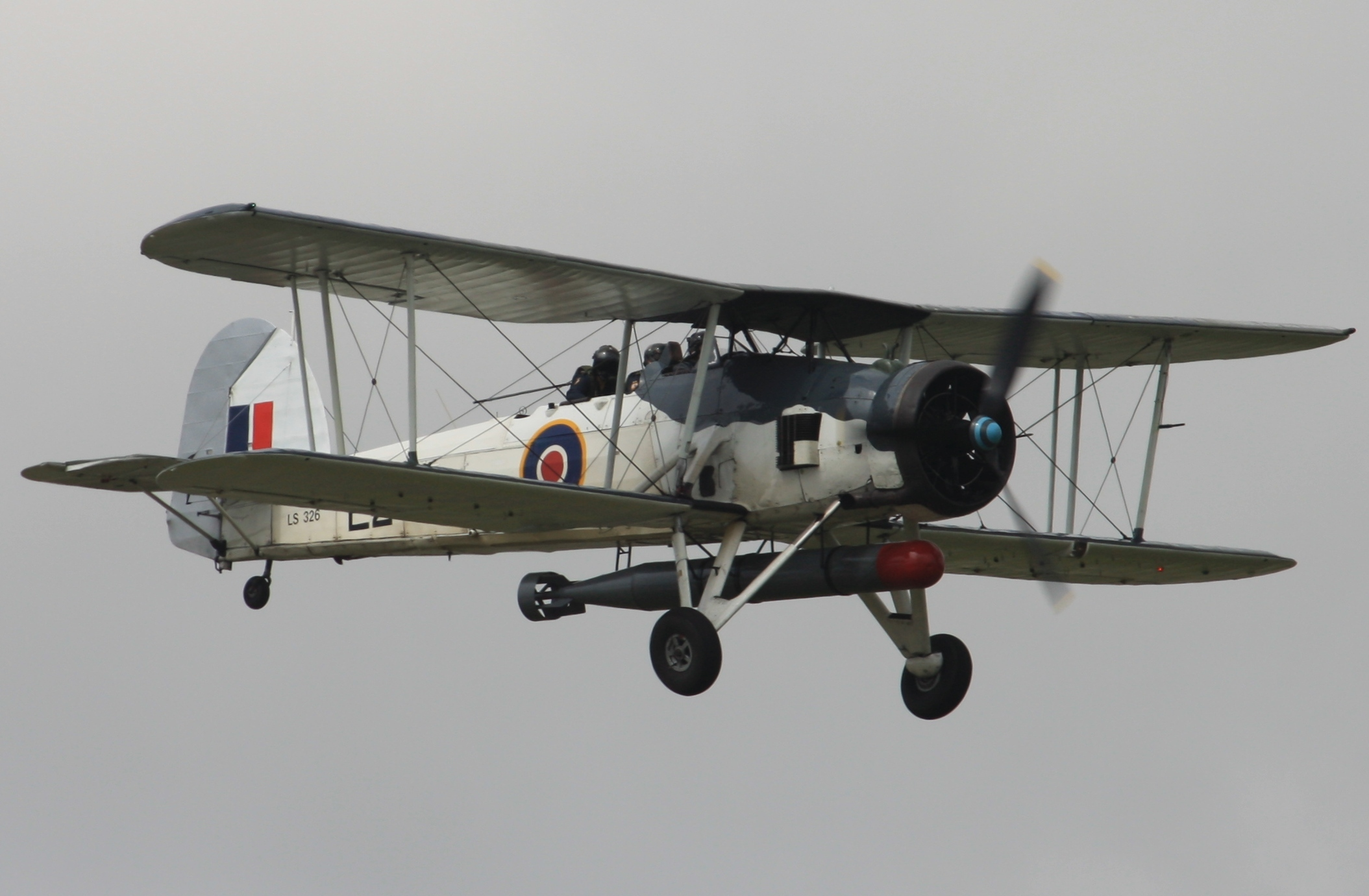
- Fairey Swordfish II, an example of the type used by 745 NAS
- Active: 1943–1945; 1956–1957
- Disbanded: 1 November 1957
- Country: United Kingdom
- Branch: Royal Navy
- Type: Fleet Air Arm Second Line Squadron
- Role: Telegraphist Air Gunner Training Squadron; Radar Jamming Trials Unit
- Size: Squadron
- Part of: Fleet Air Arm
- Home station: See Naval air stations section for full list.

Insignia
- Identification Markings: letter/number combinations (Swordfish); 795-798 (Avenger)
- Fin Shore Codes: GN (Avenger)

Aircraft flown
- Attack: Fairey Swordfish
- Electronic warfare: Grumman Avenger

745 Naval Air Squadron (745 NAS) was a Fleet Air Arm (FAA) naval air squadron of the United Kingdom’s Royal Navy (RN). It was initially active from 1943 to 1945 as a Telegraphist Air Gunner Training squadron, part of No.2 Telegraphist Air Gunner School based at RN Air Section Yarmouth, Nova Scotia, Canada. It reformed in April 1956 at HMS Gannet, RNAS Eglinton, Northern Ireland, as a Radar Jamming Trials Unit. It operated with four modified Grumman Avenger aircraft, undertaking a trials evaluation of the 'Orange Harvest' radar warning receiver equipment, disbanding in November 1957.

== History ==
=== Telegraphist Air Gunner Training Squadron (1943-1945) ===
745 Naval Air Squadron assembled at RNAS Lee-on-Solent (HMS Daedalus), on 10 February 1943, for passage to Canada, which then formed as a Telegraphist Air Gunner Training Squadron on the 1 March 1943, at RN Air Section Yarmouth, Nova Scotia, Canada, where the Admiralty had lodger facilities for an RN air section at Royal Canadian Air Force base Yarmouth. It was part of No. 2 Telegraphist Air Gunner School, within the Royal Navy No. 1 Naval Air Gunnery School (NAGS), which was under the British Commonwealth Air Training Plan. It was equipped with the biplane torpedo bomber aircraft Fairey Swordfish, specifically the mark II and IV variants. 745 Naval Air Squadron disbanded on 30 March 1945.

=== Radar Jamming Trials Unit (1956-1957) ===
745 Naval Air Squadron reformed on 23 April 1956 at RNAS Eglinton (HMS Gannet), County Londonderry, Northern Ireland, as a radar jamming trials unit, out of 'X' Flight of 744 Naval Air Squadron. It was equipped with four Grumman Avenger AS5, an anti-submarine strike version of the American torpedo bomber and these aircraft were modified for tactical evaluation of the 'Orange Harvest' equipment. Occasionally the squadron deployed aircraft to RAF St Mawgan, Cornwall, England, for trials alongside the Air-Sea Warfare Development Unit RAF (ASWDU).

In May 1957 the Squadron moved temporarily to RAF Ballykelly, County Londonderry, to enable the runways at RNAS Eglinton to be resurfaced. Autumn 1957 saw 745 Naval Air Squadron return to RNAS Eglinton and it also conducted trials aboard the Centaur-class aircraft carriers HMS Albion and HMS Bulwark. The squadron disbanded on 1 November 1957.

== Aircraft operated ==
The squadron has operated a couple of different aircraft types, including:

- Fairey Swordfish II torpedo bomber (March 1943 - March 1945)
- Fairey Swordfish IV torpedo bomber (January - March 1945)
- Grumman Avenger AS.5 anti-submarine strike aircraft (May 1956 - October 1957)

== Naval air stations ==
745 Naval Air Squadron operated from a number of naval air station of the Royal Navy, in the United Kingdom and one in Canada:

1943 - 1945

- RN Air Section Yarmouth, Nova Scotia, (1 March 1943 - 30 March 1945)
- disbanded - (30 March 1945)

1956 - 1957

- Royal Naval Air Station Eglinton (HMS Gannet), County Londonderry, (23 April 1956 - 2 May 1957)
- Royal Air Force Ballykelly, County Londonderry, (2 May 1957 - 22 September 1957)
  - Royal Naval Air Station Culdrose (HMS Seahawk), Cornwall, (Detachment 6 - 16 May 1957)
  - Royal Naval Air Station Ford (HMS Peregrine), Sussex, (Detachment four aircraft 20 August - 3 September 1957)
  - HMS Albion (Detachment two aircraft 3 - 29 September 1957)
- Royal Naval Air Station Eglinton (HMS Gannet), County Londonderry, (22 September - 1 November 1957)
  - HMS Bulwark (Detachment two aircraft 11 - 18 October 1957)
- disbanded - (1 November 1957)

== Commanding officers ==
List of commanding officers of 745 Naval Air Squadron with date of appointment:

1943 - 1945

- Lieutenant Commander(A) R.H. Ovey. RNVR, from 1 March 1943
- Lieutenant Commander(A) F.A.H. Harley, RN, from 6 November 1944
- disbanded - 30 March 1945

1956 - 1957

- Lieutenant Commander M.F. Bowen, RN, from 16 April 1956
- disbanded - 1 November 1957

Note: Abbreviation (A) signifies Air Branch of the RN or RNVR.
