= RAF Carew Cheriton =

Former Royal Air Force station in Pembrokeshire, Wales

RAF Carew Cheriton
- Carew, Pembrokeshire in Wales
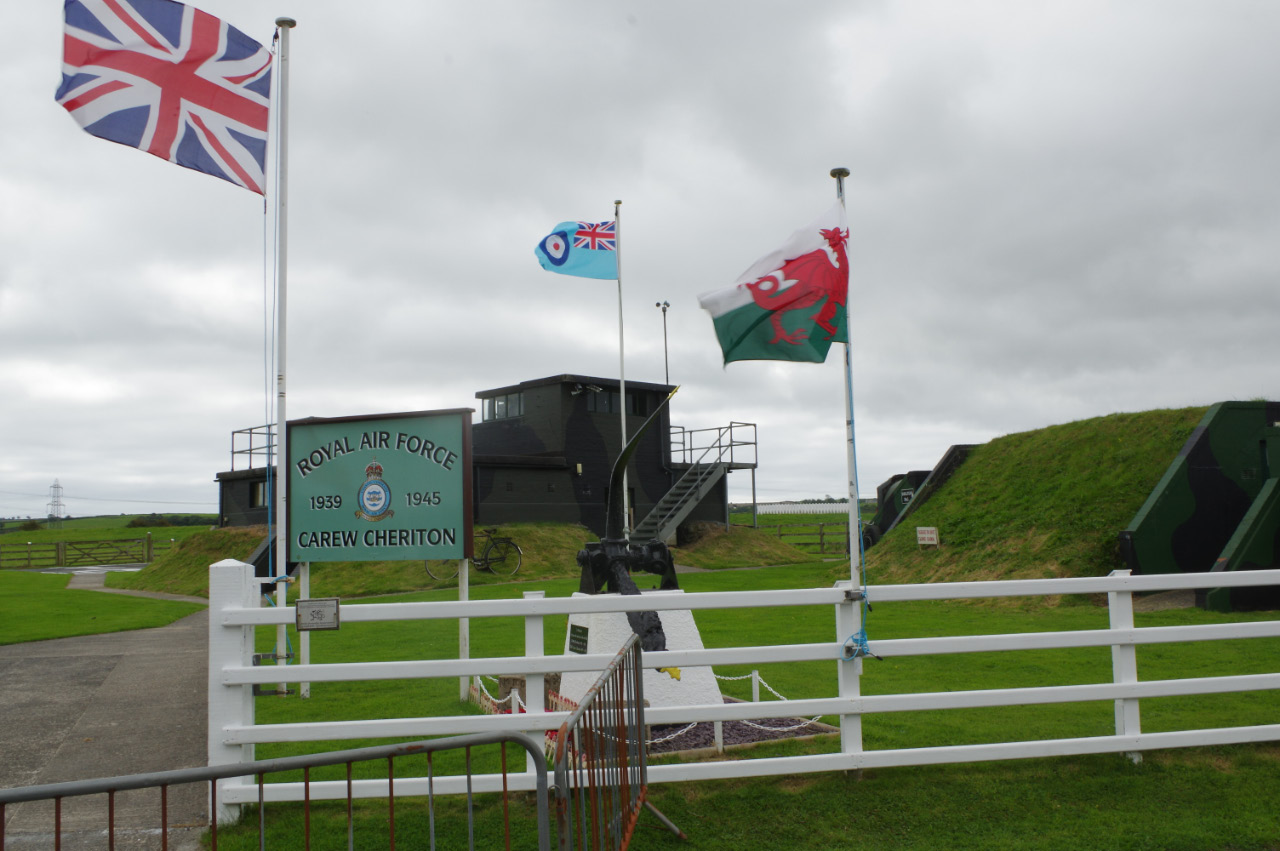
- RAF Carew Cheriton control tower

Site information
- Type: Royal Air Force station
- Owner: Air Ministry
- Operator: Royal Air Force
- Controlled by: RAF Coastal Command (1939–1942); No. 15 Group RAF; RAF Flying Training Command (1942); No. 25 Group RAF; RAF Technical Training Command (1942–1945); No. 27 Group RAF (1944)

Location
- Shown within Pembrokeshire RAF Carew Cheriton (the United Kingdom)
- Coordinates: 51°41′23″N 004°48′39″W

Site history
- Built: 1938
- In use: 1938–1945
- Battles/wars: European theatre of World War II

Airfield information
- Elevation: 28 metres (92 ft) AMSL
Runways
Direction	Length and surface
06/24	965 metres (3,166 ft) Asphalt
12/30	1,040 metres (3,412 ft) Asphalt
16/34	765 metres (2,510 ft) Asphalt

Royal Air Force Carew Cheriton, or more simply RAF Carew Cheriton, is a former Royal Air Force station near Carew, Pembrokeshire, Wales. It was 4.7 miles (7.6 km) north west of Tenby.

It covered, and was larger than, the site of the First World War airship station, RNAS Pembroke (aka Milton), which had been decommissioned and sold off by the Admiralty during the interwar period. It opened in the 1939, for RAF Coastal Command. The station was transferred to RAF Technical Training Command in 1942 and closed in 1945.

== History ==
=== First World War ===
==== Milton Airship Station / RNAS Pembroke ====
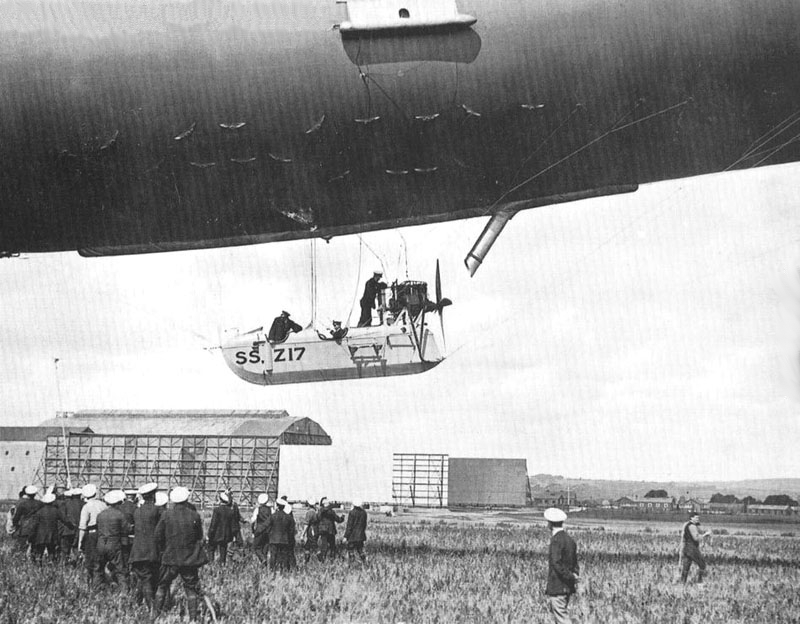
SSZ-class airship SSZ17 Landing at Royal Naval Air Station Pembroke 1917. The hangars in the background are no longer standing.

The First World War airship station at Milton, RNAS Pembroke, officially opened in August 1915. Out of the airship station Submarine Scout or Sea Scout SS class airship, Sea Scout Zero SSZ class airship and C-Class or Coastals Coastal class airship, all non-rigid airships, operated over the Irish Sea, Bristol Channel and Western Approaches, on anti-submarine patrols. In February 1916, the airship base saw the building of two 120 feet (37 m) x 318 feet (97 m) corrugated iron airship hangars with windshields, along with two hydrogen storage facilities. Accommodation was a mix of wooden huts, canvas workshops along with tented accommodation. In April 1917 the base began hosting fixed-wing aircraft and Bessonneau hangars were constructed. Initially Sopwith 1½ Strutter biplanes were used, followed by Airco D.H.6 biplane, in August 1918.

The Admiralty's response to enemy submarines operating in the Irish Sea was the use of airships for maritime patrol. RNAS Pembroke's patrol area covered from Dublin in Ireland down to Lundy in the south, covering the St George's Channel and Cardigan Bay. An airship station was constructed at Killeagh, in east County Cork, providing moorings and refuelling on the western edge of the patrol area. The airships C13, C5A and C6 operated from RNAS Pembroke.

==== RAF Pembroke ====
Upon the formation of the Royal Air Force (RAF) on 1 April 1918, the Royal Naval Air Service (RNAS) ceased to exist. The location acquired the dual designation of RAF Pembroke and Royal Naval Airship Station Pembroke. Use of the designation "RN Airship Station" was entirely valid, because the airships remained the property of the Admiralty, never being transferred to the Air Ministry. RAF Pembroke was part of No. 14 Group RAF, the redesignation of the RNAS Milford Haven Anti-Submarine Group which relocated to RAF Pembroke on 1 April 1919. However, the group disbanded on 19 May 1919.

No. 519 (Special Duty) Flight formed at RAF Pembroke on 6 June 1918 along with No. 520 (Special Duty) Flight. Both flights were equipped with Airco DH.6 aircraft. No. 255 Squadron RAF was formed at RAF Pembroke the following month, on 25 July 1918, parenting both No. 519 and No. 520 (Special Duty) Flights, along with 521, 522, 523 and 524 (Special Duty) Flights. It was tasked with anti-submarine patrols over the St George's Channel and the Bristol Channel. No. 519 and No. 520 (Special Duty) Flights were known as 'A' Flight and 'B' Flight respectively, within No. 255 Sqn. During July and August 1918, the latter four flights transferred to other squadrons, leaving No. 255 Sqn with only two flights. The squadron and its two flights disbanded at RAF Pembroke on 14 January 1919.

The entire site was decommissioned and closed in 1920 and the corrugated iron hangars were dismantled later during the decade.

=== Second World War ===
==== RAF Coastal Command ====
The large RAF Coastal Command base at RAF Pembroke Dock needed short range escort and anti-submarine units to support operations. This resulted in the re-opening of the old airship station and utilising additional fields to build a three runway airfield for No. 15 Group RAF. Construction commenced in 1938, and the airfield re-opened in April 1939, some months before the start of the Second World War. Three concrete runways were built by the early 1940s, with lengths of 16/34 700 m (2296 ft); 06/24 791 m (2595 ft); and 12/30 951 m (3120 ft), all 46 m (150 ft) wide. There were two Bellman hangars and two Bessonneau hangars. With the airfield being used as a support station for the flying boat operations at RAF Pembroke Dock, instead of using the old name of Pembroke, it was renamed as RAF Carew Cheriton which enabled it to be distinguished from RAF Pembroke Dock.

'B' Flight, No. 1 Anti-Aircraft Co-operation Unit arrived in April 1939 with Hawker Henley target tugs for use with the anti-aircraft training school at RAF Manorbier. However, the start of the war saw operational patrols began with the arrival of a detachment from No. 217 Sqn, of Avro Anson I aircraft for short range patrols against submarines and air attacks. An RAF Bomber Command detachment of Vickers Wellington aircraft from No. 75 Sqn at RAF Harwell was used to support the coastal patrols, from September 1939.

While under the control of Coastal Command, 818 Naval Air Squadron had a detachment of Fairey Swordfish I operating out of RAF Carew Cheriton in support of anti-submarine and maritime patrol duties from the 14 to the 18 June 1940, before embarking on HMS Ark Royal (91) for the Mediterranean Sea. 818 NAS was followed by 825 Naval Air Squadron at RAF Carew Cheriton, between the 20 and 27 June 1940 also with Fairey Swordfish I, before moving to RNAS Worthy Down.

No. 320 and No. 321 (Netherland) Sqns were tasked with convoy patrols and anti-submarine operations using Avro Anson aircraft. The two squadrons were made up of Royal Netherlands Naval Air Service personnel who had fled the German invasion of the Netherlands. At RAF Carew Cheriton they converted to Lockheed Hudson aircraft. The squadrons combined, with No. 321 Sqn disbanding and leaving for RAF Leuchars in March 1941.

Between July 1940 and April 1941 the airfield was attacked and bombed five times by the Luftwaffe. On 19 July 1940 a single Heinkel He 111 attacked the airfield and there were no casualties. A Junkers Ju 88 attacked the airfield on 1 October 1940, destroying a Bellman hangar, two Avro Anson aircraft and damaging a Hawker Henley aircraft; one airman was killed and a number injured. Two more attacks followed with no casualties, however, the last one on 15 April 1941 saw six Heinkel He 111 aircraft attack the airfield and damage seven Bristol Blenheim aircraft, a Hawker Hurricane aircraft and an Avro Anson aircraft. A bomb hit and destroyed the sick bay, killing twelve airmen.

In October 1940, the Coastal Command Tactical Development Unit formed at RAF Carew Cheriton, tasked with undertaking various trials. 'Tactical' was soon dropped from the name. The Coastal Command Development Unit RAF left at the end of 1941.

No. 32 and No. 238 Sqns operated detachments of Hawker Hurricane fighter aircraft at RAF Carew Cheriton between April and June 1941, following the Luftwaffe attacks on the airfield. They provided some fighter defence just prior to RAF Angle becoming operational for fighter aircraft. No. 236 Sqn arrived in March with Bristol Blenheim aircraft for anti-shipping operations. No. 48 Sqn's detachment of Bristol Beaufort aircraft left in August, followed by No. 217 Sqn with its Bristol Beaufort aircraft, going in October.

Greek prince, Prince Peter of Greece and Denmark and the Polish military and political leader, General Władysław Sikorski, had flown to RAF Pembroke Dock and then travelled by road to RAF Carew Cheriton. No. 24 Sqn then flew them onwards to RAF Hendon, aboard a de Havilland Flamingo airliner, on 6 January 1942. Early 1942 also saw the departures of No. 236 Sqn and the detachment from No. 500 Sqn from RAF Carew Cheriton, and the arrival of No. 254 Sqn which then undertook the maritime patrol duties. The squadron left for RAF Dyce in the following June and at that point RAF Coastal Command ceased using RAF Carew Cheriton.

==== RAF Technical Training Command ====
RAF Coastal Command's operational flying from the airfield ceased in July 1942, when the airfield was handed over to RAF Flying Training Command, before being passed on to RAF Technical Training Command in October. The station became home to No. 10 Radio School RAF, a training camp for aircrew wireless operators. The school disbanded in November 1945 and RAF Carew Cheriton closed the same month.

=== Postwar ===
No. 74 Gliding School arrived from RAF Templeton in 1946. The school was equipped with Slingsby Kirby Cadet TX.1, a single-seat glider. It disbanded at RAF Carew Cheriton in December 1946, being absorbed by No. 68 Gliding School.

The base was used as an emergency landing site on two occasions after its closure. A Bristol Beaufighter TT Mk.10 attempted an emergency landing, on 7 August 1951. The aircraft from No. 4 Civilian Anti-Aircraft Co-operation Unit RAF at RAF Llandow was using the range at RAF Manorbier but suffered engine failure. Carew Cheriton was the nearest runway, however, the aircraft crashed, with no survivors. A de Havilland Vampire FB.5 from Anglesey made a successful emergency landing on the old runway after experiencing mechanical problems.

Flying returned to the airfield a couple of times. During 1952 and 1953, when the RAF Pembroke Dock Station Flight operated out of RAF Carew Cheriton for a short period. June 1976 saw the Royal Navy's Fleet Air Arm use the old airfield, when 846 Naval Air Squadron equipped with Westland Wessex helicopters, took part in an exercise at the Castlemartin Training Area.

== Royal Air Force operational history ==
=== Maritime Patrol ===
217 Squadron

No. 217 Squadron RAF based at RAF St Eval, operated a detachment of Avro Anson I aircraft at RAF Carew Cheriton from the 2 October 1939, to support the maritime patrols. While the Short Sunderland flying boats from RAF Pembroke Dock undertook the long-range maritime reconnaissance patrols, the Avro Anson was tasked with the short-range, anti-submarine work and coastal convoy protection from air attacks. The detachment left in July 1940.

320 Squadron

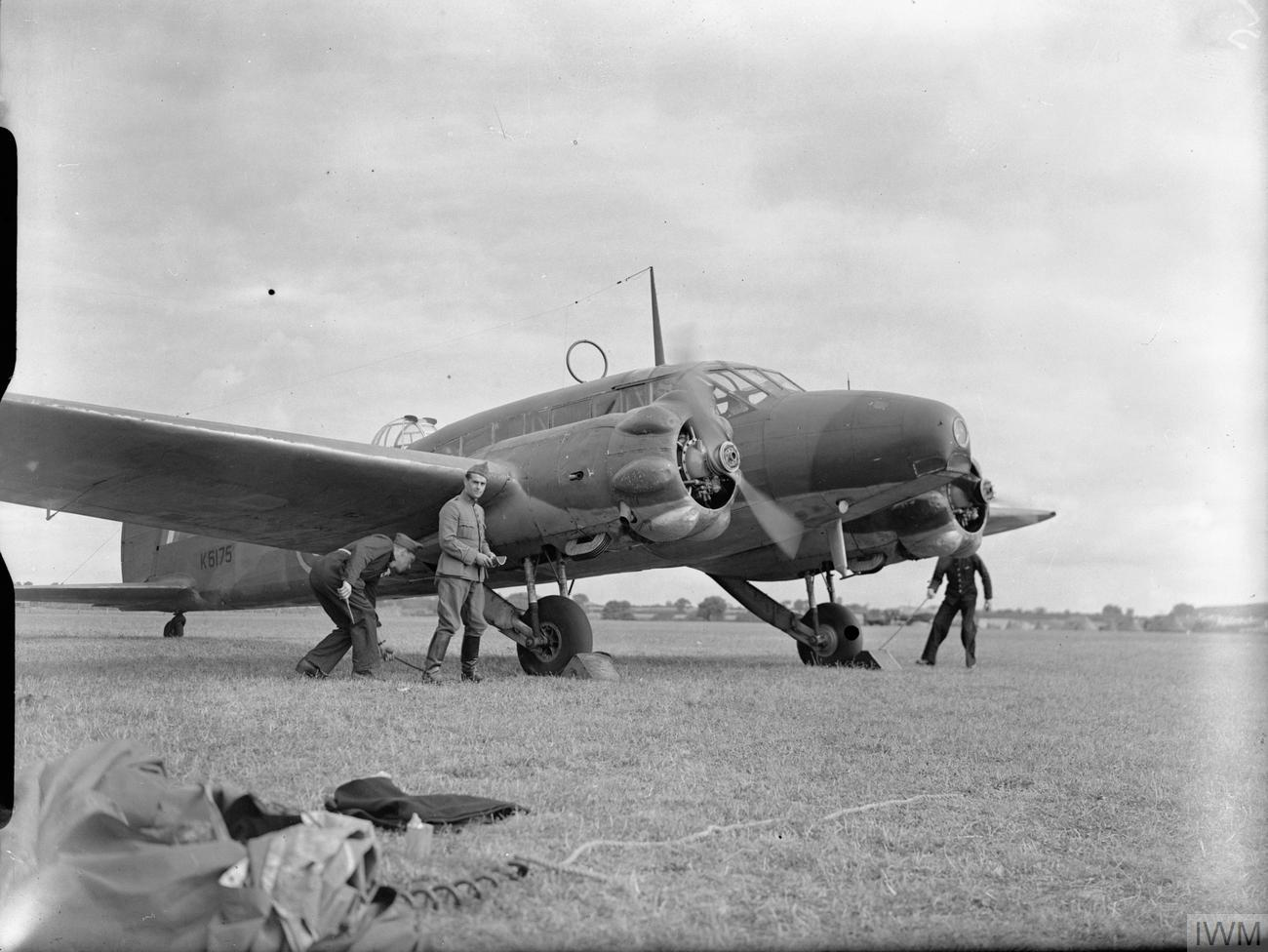
The wheel chocks are removed from Avro Anson Mark I, K6175, of No. 320 (Dutch) Squadron RAF before taking off on a patrol from Carew Cheriton, Pembrokeshire

No. 320 (Netherlands) Squadron RAF formed on 1 June 1940 at RAF Pembroke Dock, after flying in from the Netherlands in eight Fokker T.VIII, a twin-engined torpedo bomber and aerial reconnaissance floatplane. The squadron flew coastal and anti-submarine patrols in the Fokkers until they became unserviceable due to lack of spare parts and then the squadron was re-equipped with Avro Anson I aircraft in June 1940 and further supplemented in October with Lockheed Hudson I aircraft.

The land based aircraft were part of a detachment operating at RAF Carew Cheriton. Due to insufficient personnel, No. 321 (Dutch) Sqn was absorbed on 18 January 1941. The squadron moved to RAF Leuchars on 1 October 1941, although a detachment was located at RAF Carew Cheriton until 21 April 1942 when the whole squadron moved to RAF Bircham Newton.

321 Squadron

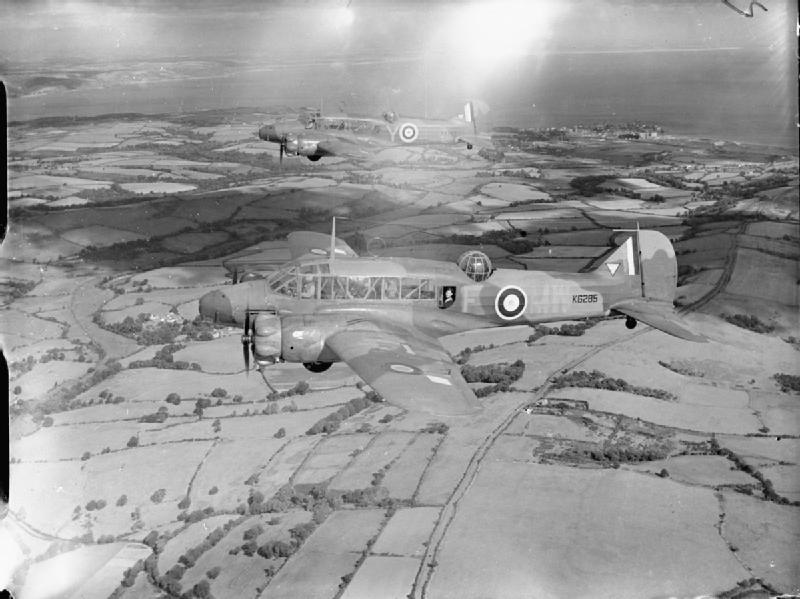
Avro Anson Mk.I K6285/MW-F foreground and Avro Anson Mk.I N9742/MW-Y background of No.321 (Dutch) Squadron RAF.

No. 321 (Netherlands) Squadron RAF formed on 1 June 1940 at RAF Pembroke Dock, then moved to RAF Carew Cheriton on 28 July 1940 and became operational. The squadron flew coastal and anti-submarine patrols with Avro Anson I aircraft until the squadron was disbanded, due to lack of personnel, and merged with No. 320 (Netherlands) Squadron RAF, on 18 January 1941.

48 Squadron

No. 48 Squadron RAF stationed at RAF Hooton Park, operated a detachment of Bristol Beaufort I from the 16 July 1940, effectively replacing No. 217 Sqn at RAF Carew Cheriton in its role of short-range maritime patrols. The detachment eventually left on 3 August 1941 when the squadron moved to RAF Stornoway.

236 Squadron

No. 236 Squadron RAF took the place of the No. 320 (Netherlands) Squadron RAF, arriving at RAF Carew Cheriton on 21 March 1941. The squadron operated Bristol Blenheim IVF aircraft in the anti-shipping role. Using RAF St Eval as a forward airfield, a detachment was based there and undertook reconnaissance operations over Brest, France. The squadron also provided fighter escort for BOAC Douglas DC-3 flights, between Lisbon and the United Kingdom. From October 1941, it received Bristol Beaufighter IC aircraft. The squadron remained at RAF Carew Cheriton until the 9 February 1942, when it relocated to RAF Wattisham.

500 Squadron

No. 500 (County of Kent) Squadron AAF provided a detachment of Bristol Blenheim IV aircraft on 30 May 1941 from RAF Bircham Newton. In November 1941 the squadron converted to Lockheed Hudson I aircraft. It left for RAF Stornoway on 22 March 1942.

254 Squadron

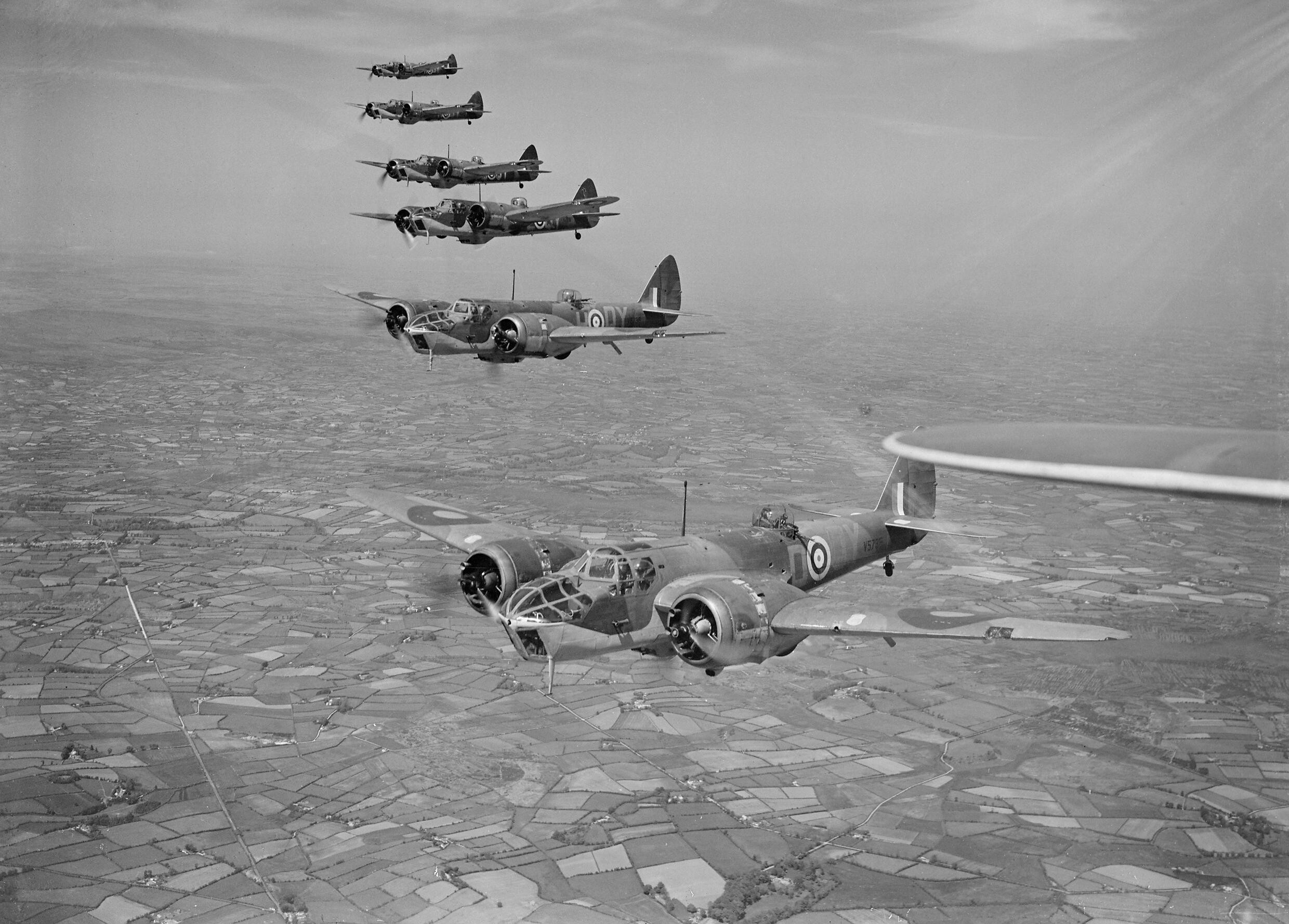
Bristol Blenheim Mk IVF of No. 254 Squadron RAF

No. 254 Squadron RAF replaced No. 236 Squadron RAF at the air station, arriving on 11 February 1942 from RAF Dyce. The squadron was equipped with Bristol Blenheim IVF aircraft. It remained at the air station in Pembrokeshire for around four months until the 1 June 1942, returning to RAF Dyce.

=== Anti-Aircraft Co-operation ===
'B' Flight, No. 1 Anti-Aircraft Co-operation Unit (No 1 AACU) arrived in April 1939. It was equipped with Hawker Henley target tugs for use with No. 3 Heavy Anti-aircraft Armament Practice Camp at RAF Manorbier. Between October 1941 and March 1942 it was based at RAF Aberporth, then returning to RAF Carew Cheriton. It disbanded on 1 November 1942, renumbering as No. 1607 (Anti-Aircraft Co-operation) Flight.

'L' Flight, No. 1 Anti-Aircraft Co-operation Unit arrived in April 1940. This unit was required to support the range at Aberporth and eventually moved there in the October.

No. 1607 (Anti-Aircraft Co-operation) Flight, which was a redesignation of 'B' Flight, No. 1 AACU on 1 November 1942, formed at RAF Carew Cheriton. It was equipped with Hawker Henley III, Miles Martinet I and de Havilland Tiger Moth II aircraft.

=== Coastal Command Development Unit ===
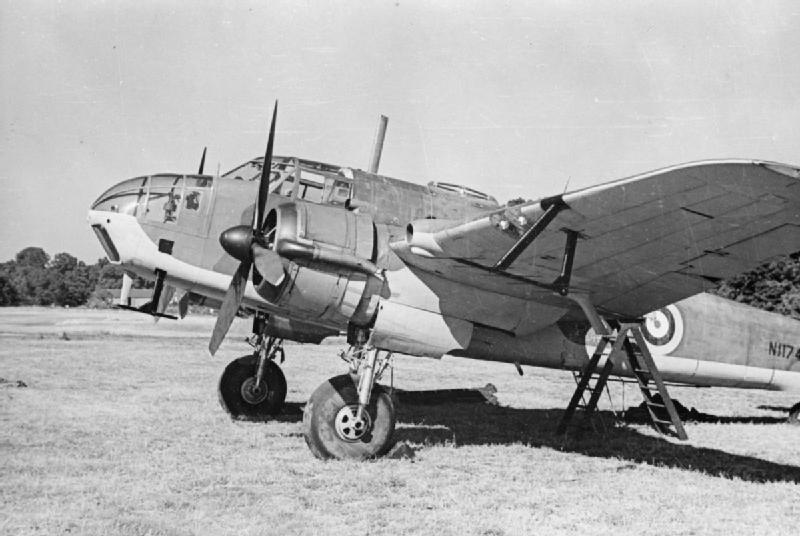
Bristol Beaufort Mark I, N1174, of the Coastal Command Development Unit based at Carew Cheriton, fitted with ASV (air-to-surface vessel) Mark II radar, while undergoing trials. The transmitter antenna is the black object mounted under the nose, the receiver is the much larger black antenna fitted under the wing.

On 22 October 1940 the Coastal Command Tactical Development Unit RAF was formed at RAF Carew Cheriton. It was equipped with:

- Armstrong Whitworth Whitley V medium bomber aircraft
- Lockheed Hudson I light bomber and coastal reconnaissance aircraft
- Bristol Beaufort I twin-engined torpedo bomber
- Vickers Wellington IA twin-engined, long-range medium bomber

On 30 December 1940, the unit disbanded but immediately reformed, redesignating as the Coastal Command Development Unit RAF. The unit was tasked with a variety of trials and also utilised flying boats from RAF Pembroke Dock. It undertook service trials of all radar equipment such as ASV (air-to-surface-vessel) radar to assist RAF Coastal Command operations. It investigated into the use of bomb and depth charges for attacks on submarines and surface vessels by night with the aid of parachute lights and later with Leigh Lights. The Coastal Command Development Unit moved to RAF Ballykelly in December 1941.

=== Radio School ===
No. 10 Radio School RAF formed on 1 January 1943 at RAF Carew Cheriton, as a redesignation of No. 4 Radio Direction Finding School RAF. It was equipped with:

- Avro Anson I
- Airspeed Oxford I
- Percival Proctor III
- Lockheed Hudson I
- de Havilland Tiger Moth II
- de Havilland Moth Minor
- Miles Master III
- Supermarine Spitfire Vb

No. 4 Radio Direction Finding School RAF had previously absorbed No. 1447 (Radar Calibration) Flight RAF on 15 December 1942, the latter having moved in from RAF Hooton Park, This then becoming 'A' Flight of No. 10 Radio School RAF. Sixteen Avro Anson aircraft were provided by No. 5 Operational Training Unit RAF to form a second flight and eventually all wireless operator training went through the school rather than the OTU. No. 10 Radio School RAF disbanded on 24 November 1945.

=== Other Units ===
Fighter Cover

No. 238 Squadron RAF based at RAF Pembrey operated a detachment between the 1–16 April 1941, to provide air cover for RAF Carew Cheriton, due to the Luftwaffe attacks on the airfield and fighter cover for the maritime patrols. It was equipped with Hawker Hurricane IIA aircraft. These were immediately followed by No. 32 Squadron RAF, also based at RAF Pembrey and which operated a detachment at RAF Carew Cheriton from the 17 April through to the 1 June 1941, when the squadron relocated to RAF Angle. It was equipped with Hawker Hurricane I aircraft.

No. 5 Coastal Patrol Flight

No. 5 Coastal Patrol Flight (No 5 CPF) was formed on 1 March 1940 at RAF Carew Cheriton. It was equipped with de Havilland Tiger Moth II and de Havilland Hornet Moth biplanes. It was affiliated to No. 217 Squadron RAF, supporting the short range coastal patrols, due to the shortage of aircraft. The flight disbanded on 25 May 1940 at RAF Carew Cheriton.

Armament Practice Camp

No. 19 Group Armament Practice Camp (No 19 GAPC) formed in October 1941 at RAF Carew Cheriton. It was equipped with a Westland Lysander II aircraft, however, it disbanded the following month to become No. 4 Armament Practice Camp.

No. 4 Armament Practice Camp RAF (No. 4 APC) was formed at RAF Carew Cheriton on 5 November 1941 from the redesignation of No. 19 Group Armament Practice Camp. It provided instruction in Air-to-air combat, air-to-surface firing and anti-submarine attacks. It operated:

- Westland Lysander Mk.IIIA
- Fairey Battle
- Miles Master II
- Miles Martinet TT.Mk I

No. 4 APC moved to RAF Talbenny in December 1942.

RAF Regiment

No. 2854 Squadron RAF Regiment was formed in May 1942 at RAF Carew Cheriton. The following year it converted to a Light Anti-aircraft role.

== Current use ==
The site is no longer used as an airfield though much remains, including the runway. The airfield is used for various events and activities including car boot sales, auctions and part of the airfield has been converted for use as a go-cart track.

== Heritage ==
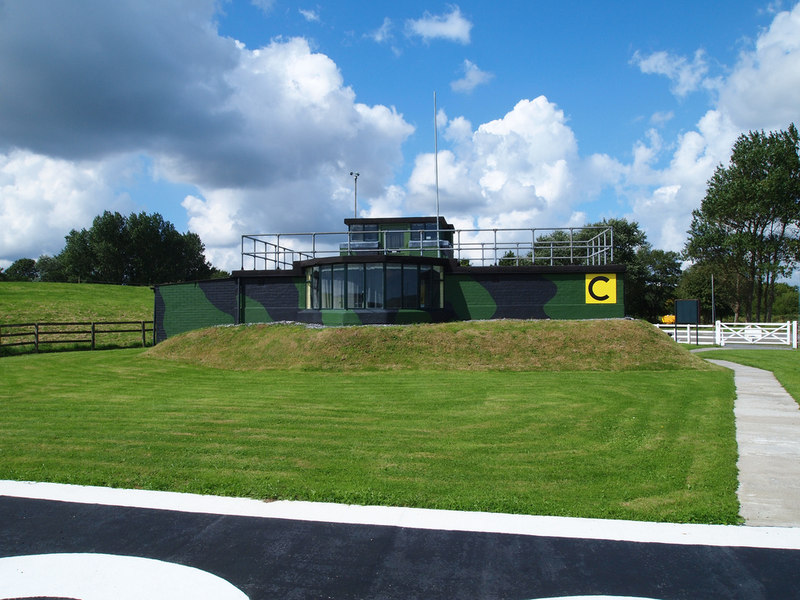
RAF Carew Cheriton Control Tower, as restored, in 2010

The Control Tower building, with watch office, has been restored to its 1940s condition, with the interior recreated from first hand accounts from personnel who served. The flight board information is exact from 23 October 1941.

In 2019 a memorial was unveiled to those of the 5,000 soldiers in the United States Army's 110th Infantry Regiment, stationed in Pembrokeshire from 1943 to 1944, who died during the liberation of Europe.

== Previous units ==
A partial list of units previously based at RAF Carew Cheriton.

=== Royal Air Force ===
Squadron	Aircraft	From	To	Moved To	Notes
No. 32 Squadron RAF	Hawker Hurricane I	17 April 1941	1 June 1941	RAF Angle	Detachment from RAF Pembrey.
No. 48 Squadron RAF	Bristol Beaufort I	16 July 1940	3 August 1941	RAF Stornoway	Detachment from RAF Hooton Park.
No. 75 (New Zealand) Squadron RAF	Vickers Wellington I	14 September 1939	8 April 1940	disbanded	Detachment from RAF Harwell.
No. 206 Squadron RAF					
No. 217 Squadron RAF	Avro Anson I Bristol Beaufort I	2 October 1939	29 October 1941	RAF Thorney Island	Detachment from RAF St Eval.
No. 236 Squadron RAF	Bristol Blenheim IVF; Bristol Beaufighter IC	21 March 1941	9 February 1942	RAF Wattisham	A detachment was at RAF St Eval.
No. 238 Squadron RAF	Hawker Hurricane IIA	1 April 1941	16 April 1941	RAF Chilbolton	Detachment from RAF Pembrey.
No. 248 Squadron RAF					
No. 254 Squadron RAF	Bristol Blenheim IVF	11 February 1942	1 June 1942	RAF Dyce	
No. 255 Squadron RAF	Airco DH.6	25 July 1918	14 January 1919	disbanded	
No. 286 Squadron RAF	Hawker Hurricane IIC	April 1942	April 1944	RAF Zeals	Detachment from RAF Lulsgate Bottom.
No. 320 (Netherlands) Squadron RAF	Lockheed Hudson I	18 January 1941	21 March 1941	RAF Leuchars	Absorbed 321 Squadron.
No. 321 (Netherlands) Squadron RAF	Avro Anson I	24 June 1940	18 January 1941	RAF Carew Cheriton	Absorbed by 320 Squadron.
No. 500 (County of Kent) Squadron AAF	Bristol Blenheim IV	30 May 1941	22 March 1942	RAF Stornoway	Detachment from RAF Bircham Newton.
No. 587 Squadron RAF	Hawker Henley I Hawker Hurricane IV; Miles Martinet; Hawker Hurricane IIC	10 April 1944	1 October 1944	RAF Weston Zoyland	Detachment from RAF Culmhead.
No. 595 Squadron RAF					

Royal Air Force Flights and Units

- No. 14 (Operations) Group RAF
  - No. 519 (Special Duty) Flight RAF
  - No. 520 (Special Duty) Flight RAF
- 'B' Flight of No. 1 Anti-Aircraft Co-operation Unit RAF (1 AACU)
- 'L' Flight of No. 1 Anti-Aircraft Co-operation Unit RAF (1 AACU)
- No. 1 Air Gunners School RAF
- No. 4 Armament Practice Camp RAF
- No. 4 Radio Direction Finding School RAF
- No. 5 Coastal Patrol Flight RAF
- No. 8 Anti-Aircraft Co-operation Unit RAF
- No. 19 Group Communication Flight RAF
- No. 74 Gliding School RAF
- No. 1607 (Anti-Aircraft Co-operation) Flight RAF
- No. 2854 Squadron RAF Regiment
- Coastal Command Tactical Development Unit RAF became Coastal Command Development Unit RAF
- RAF Pembroke Dock Station Flight

=== Royal Navy ===
Fleet Air Arm

Naval Air Squadron	Aircraft	From	To	Moved To	Notes
818 Naval Air Squadron	Fairey Swordfish				
825 Naval Air Squadron	Fairey Swordfish				

== See also ==
- List of former Royal Air Force stations
- List of communications units and formations of the Royal Air Force
