= Angle Peninsula Coast =

Protected area in Pembrokeshire, Wales

- Site of Special Scientific Interest
- Location within Wales
- Location of Angle Peninsula Coast.
- Area of search: Pembrokeshire
- Coordinates: 51.68022°N 5.09766°W
- Area: 133.5 hectares (1.335 km^{2})
- Notification date: 1 January 1953/16 October 2003

The Angle Peninsula Coast on the southern side of the entrance to the Milford Haven Waterway in Pembrokeshire, Wales, is a Site of Special Scientific Interest. There is a wide range of wildlife and a former Royal Air Force station.

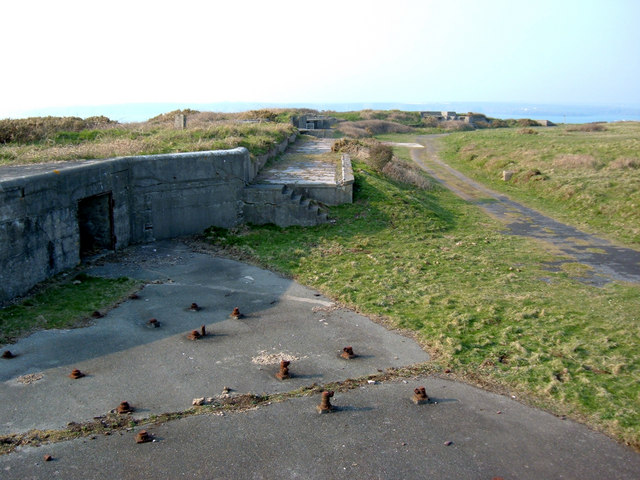
Remains of gun emplacements

The peninsula is rich in Second World War defences and the site of the former air base RAF Angle. The hollows in the banks around it were used to house machine guns in the Second World War and there was a searchlight battery here. Inland from East Picket bay are the remnants of the E-Pens used to house fighter aircraft if they were needed. In a field close to the World War I memorial there are the remains of an anti-aircraft post. On a section of the coastal path just past the RNLI lifeboat house there are visible remains of an anti-aircraft post. This site was later changed and used to house a 40 mm Rolls-Royce cannon. At the north hill, there are remains of a Laing hut that was used as housing for a searchlight. On a rocky patch of ground at west pill is a brick mine watcher hut. This was used specifically to watch out for the enemy who may be laying mines in Milford Haven.

RAF Angle was an airfield during World War II. It opened in 1941 after Luftwaffe attacks against Pembroke Dock. The airfield, which began as a station for No. 10 Group, Fighter Command, housed several squadrons during the war such as No. 312 (Czechoslovak) Squadron RAF and the Canadian 412 Transport Squadron. Planes included Supermarine Spitfires, Westland Whirlwinds and Hawker Hurricanes. In 1943 operational control passed on to the Fleet Air Arm of the Royal Navy. During this time a Sunderland flying boat landed at Angle airfield after receiving hull damage during a rescue. It returned to the RAF and became home to the Coastal Command unit who tested weapons that could be used against German U-boats. After the war was over the buildings were no longer used and many were removed in the 1980s; however, some still stand in remote locations.

On 15 February 1996, the oil tanker Sea Empress grounded at the Milford Haven Waterway entrance, spilling 72,000 tonnes of crude oil. The coastline around Angle was severely damaged. The effect of the oil spill lasted several years and cost £60 million.

== See also ==
- Angle, Pembrokeshire
