= Pele Tower, Angle =

Historic tower in Wales

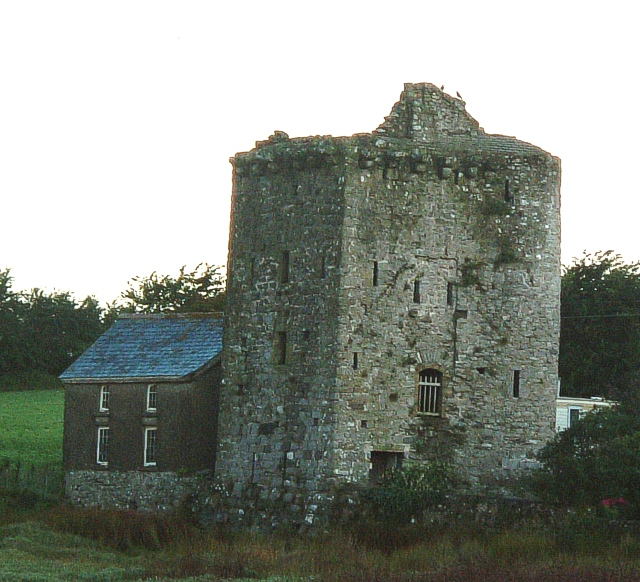

- Location within Pembrokeshire

General information
- Location: Angle, Pembrokeshire, Wales
- Coordinates: 51°41′06″N 5°05′18″W

The Pele Tower in Angle, Pembrokeshire, in southwest Wales is a Grade I-listed stone fortified tower dating back to the 14th century and is the only remaining example of a pele tower in Wales.

== History ==
The tower has been dated to about the 14th century and appears to have been part of a moated medieval mansion. Until about 1930 the remains of another building of similar dimensions were visible where the northern arm of the moat used to be and where Castle Farm is today. The tower has traditionally been known as the "Old Rectory" and lies within the rectorial glebe of the Parish of Angle. One source suggests that the tower was originally constructed and occupied by the Sherbornes, then Lords of Angle, but this has not been confirmed by other sources. The building was listed with Grade I status on 14 May 1970, as it represented a "very important specimen of mediaeval defensive domestic architecture".

== Description ==
The 9.1-metre-high (30 ft) tower is about 4.5 metres (15 ft) square. It stands on the northern bank of a tidal creek which runs down to the bay; a moat formerly surrounded the site on the other three sides. The upper floors and roof are missing, but the sandstone rubble walls of the tower are nearly complete. On the north side of the tower, the masonry is random rubble, but the other three sides are built in regular courses with a few small stones to align them. The stair turret protrudes about 0.4 metres (1 ft 4 in) on the north and east sides. At the top of the building are two-course corbels on all sides except the turret which suggest a parapet walk with Machicolations. The 1.2-metre-high (3 ft 11 in) doorway is on the east side of the first floor and has a late-medieval segmented arch. Above it in the second storey are two slits that were most likely for the drawbridge chains. Corbels are placed above them to support a hood.

Each storey consists of a single room about 3.6 metres (11 ft 10 in) square. The tower has a slightly pointed vaulted basement, which was likely used as a cellar or for storage, a first floor approached by a stair, partly external and partly inside, and a second and third storey accessed through a newel staircase. There are small square windows on the south side facing the creek; all of the other openings are arrow slits. All the floors have fireplaces installed; on the north facing wall for the first and second stories, sharing the same chimney flue inside the wall that ends in a nearly complete chimney. The fireplace for the third storey is on the east wall; all three have stone bressummers. The garderobe is in the east wall of the first storey.
