= Eirjet =

Irish airline

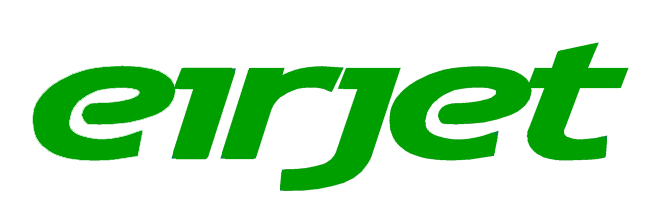

- Eirjet Airbus A320
IATA	ICAO	Call sign
Unknown	EIR	EIRJET
- Founded: 2004
- Commenced operations: 23 December 2004
- Ceased operations: 18 October 2006
- Hubs: Cork Airport; Dublin Airport; Shannon Airport
- Fleet size: 4
- Destinations: Chartered
- Parent company: Eirjet Ltd
- Headquarters: Shannon, Ireland
- Key people: Bernard Healy (Founder)
- Website: eirjet.com

Eirjet was a charter airline with its head office on the grounds of Shannon Airport in Shannon, County Clare, Ireland. It operated charter services to sun and ski destinations throughout Europe. Its main base was Shannon Airport.

The airline ceased operations on 17 October 2006 after notifying Irish aviation regulators that it was unable to meet its obligations to its tour operator clients. Efforts to find new financial backing were unsuccessful.

== History ==
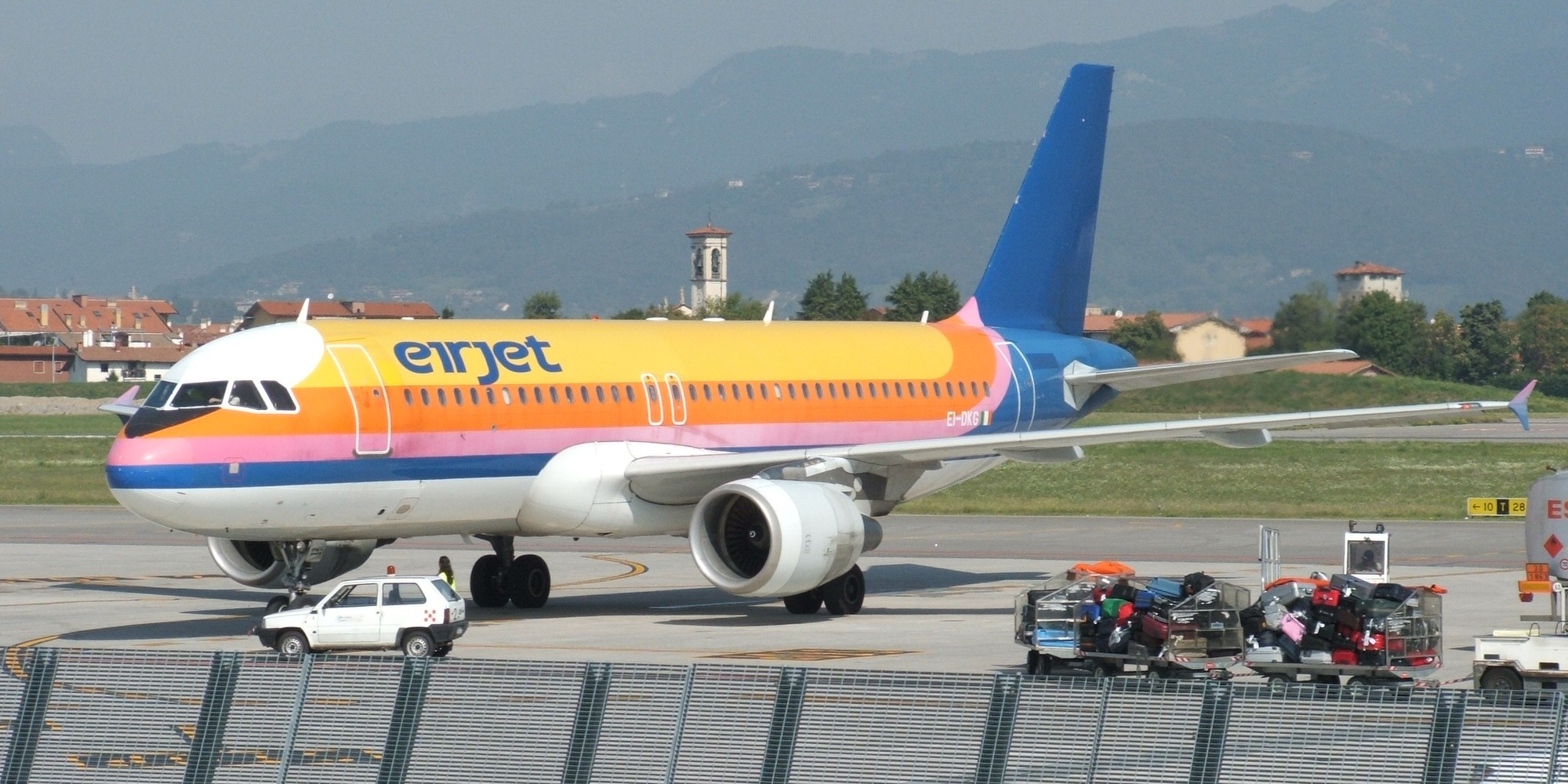
An Eirjet Airbus A320 still in the livery of former operator Air Jamaica at Orio al Serio Airport, Italy. (2006)

The airline was established in 2004 and started operations on 23 December 2004 with an inaugural flight to Agadir with an Airbus A320. Another two aircraft were added in summer 2005 to add flights from Cork and Shannon. One of them was painted in Air Jamaica colours, its former operator. The company founders include former Skynet Airlines personnel and Bernard Healy, who owns Idray, a Dublin company controlling the operations of Omni Tours, Omni Travel, Malaga Express and Faro Express.

Eirjet made an application to the United States Department of Transportation to permit the airline to perform ad hoc charters between Ireland and the USA, within the US and from the US to third countries.

The airline had an unusual philosophy of leasing aircraft. On February 18, 2006, the airline wet-leased all three of its Airbus aircraft to Ryanair and hired in three aircraft from airlines including Transavia, Flyjet and Eagle Aviation to cover its own charter program. Overselling its actual capacity and wet leasing in additional aircraft can be attributed to Eirjet's cashflow difficulties, with most subchartered activity costing the company far in excess of the revenue generated from operating the flights. At the inauguration of their operations, the company had only one Airbus A320 while their schedule demanded at least four aircraft.

== Incidents and accidents ==
- 29 March 2006 - Eirjet issued an apology after a flight it operated from Liverpool John Lennon Airport to City of Derry Airport on behalf of Ryanair landed at the wrong airfield, touching down at Ballykelly Airfield, a former RAF base and more recently an Army base some 4 miles away from its intended destination. The statement explained that the incident was caused by an "error by the Eirjet pilot who mistakenly believed he was on a visual approach to City of Derry airport". An air accident investigation report in January 2007 reported that the pilot had been unable to obtain the correct set of charts prior to the flight, only obtaining them the day after the incident. The pilot stated that if he had seen the charts, he would have been fully aware of the existence of Ballykelly and would not have landed there. The crew believed the instrument landing aid system at City of Derry was malfunctioning as what they saw of the runway did not match the instrument readings and the presence of an instrument calibrating aircraft close by added to their belief that there was a technical fault. The report also stated that although an air traffic controller thought the jet was "slightly low" he did not warn the crew about the other runway.
