= Sailors' Chapel, Angle =

Church in Pembrokeshire, Wales

Coordinates: 51.6840°N 5.0869°W

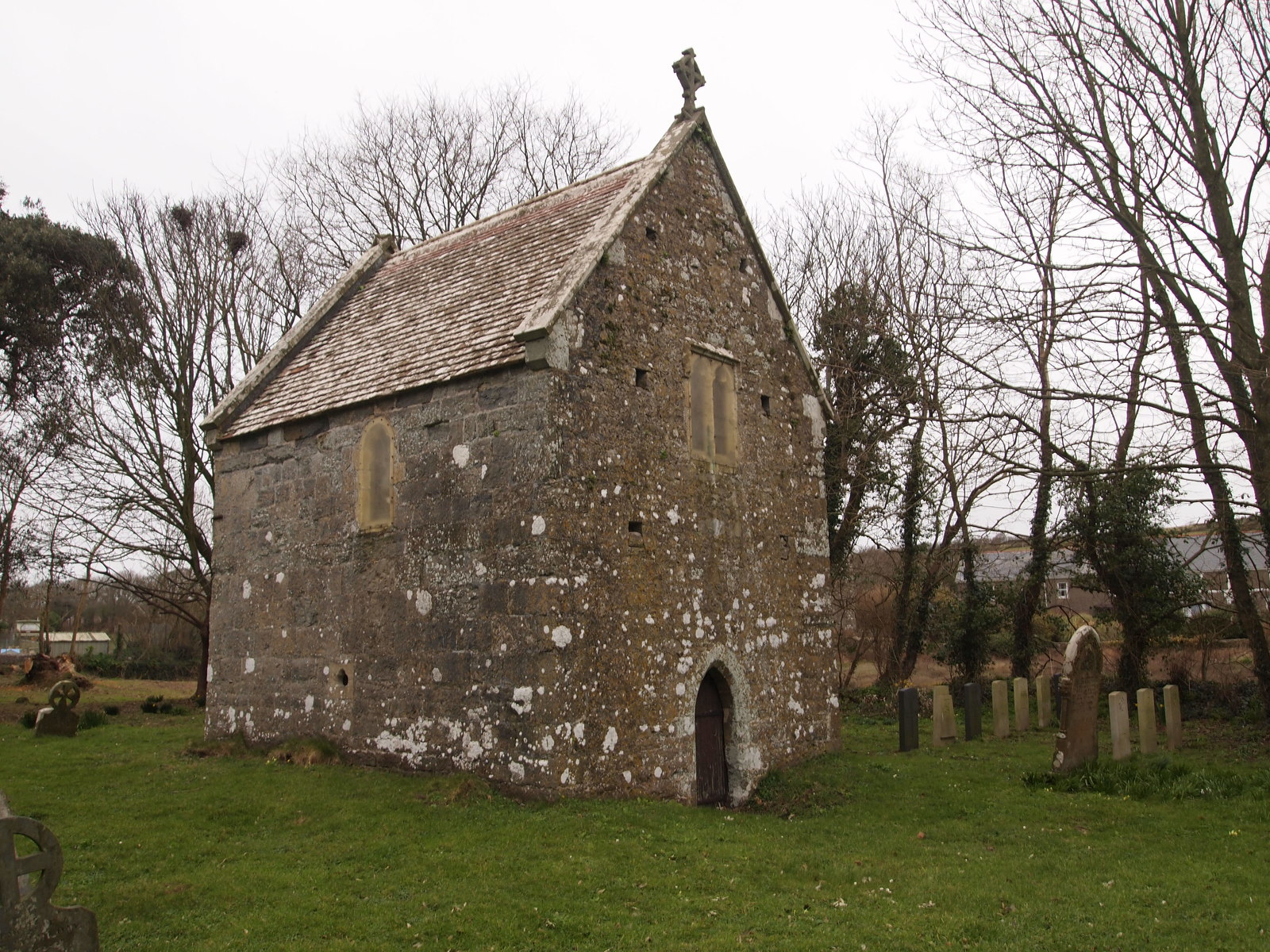

- Location in Pembrokeshire
- Country: Wales
- Denomination: Church in Wales

History
- Dedication: St Anthony

Architecture
- Heritage designation: Grade I
- Designated: 14 May 1970
- Architectural type: Church

Sailors' Chapel, Seamen's Chapel or Fishermen's Chapel is a Grade I listed building in Angle, Pembrokeshire, Wales. The chapel, which is dedicated to St Anthony, is located in the churchyard of St Mary's parish church. It was founded in 1447 and was formerly used as a receiving place for the bodies of drowned sailors.

== History ==
The chapel was founded in 1447 by Edward de Shirburn of Nangle, and was dedicated to St. Anthony. The building is located in the churchyard of St Mary's church in Angle. The chapel most likely derives its name from its crypt, which was used to hold the corpses of drowned sailors who washed ashore before they were buried. Additionally, the building served as a place for prayers for the safety of sailors as they ventured out to sea.

It was restored in 1853, and again by Elizabeth Mirehouse in 1862, and rededicated in 1929. It became a chapel of rest in the 20th century.

On 14 May 1970, it was designated as a Grade I listed building due to it being a well preserved medieval charnel chapel.

== Architecture ==
The chapel is a small, single-cell, vaulted building situated above a raised and vaulted crypt, probably built in the 15th or 16th-century. It was constructed with coarse masonry under a modern tiled roof with a Celtic cross finial. The chapel also has Victorian stained glass windows by William Wailes, one of which depicts the miracle of Christ walking upon the sea, likely added during Mirehouse's restoration in 1862. There is also a stone altar which is believed to be originally from St. Twinnel's.

It also contains a 15th-century male medieval effigy, which is speculated to be of the chapel's founder, Edward de Shirburn.
