= RAF Angle =

Former Royal Air Force station in Pembrokeshire, Wales

RAF Angle RNAS Angle HMS Goldcrest
- Near Angle, Pembrokeshire in Wales
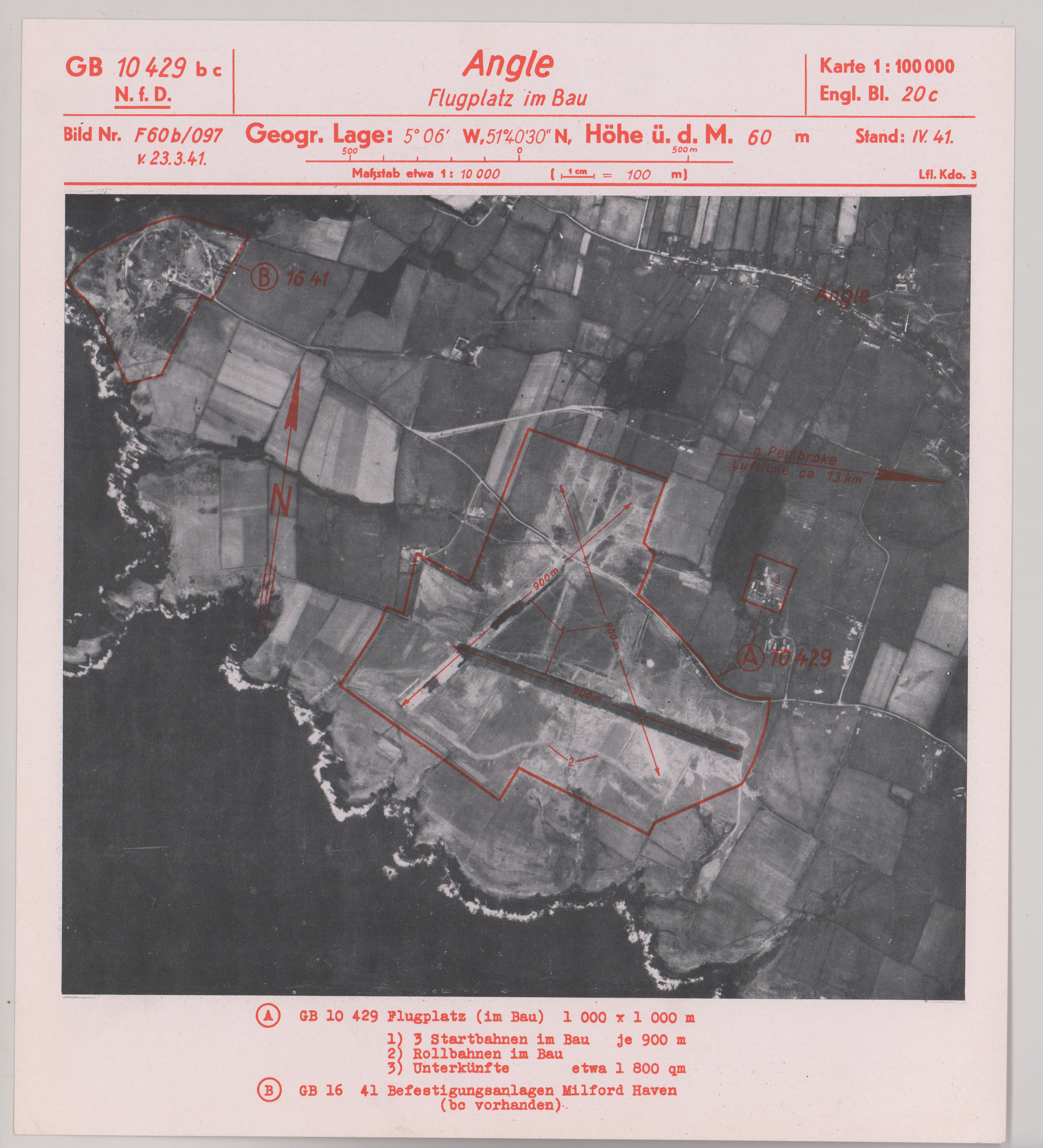
- RAF Angle on a target dosier of the german Luftwaffe while under construction, 1941

Site information
- Type: Royal Air Force station
- Code: AE
- Owner: Air Ministry; Admiralty
- Operator: Royal Air Force; Royal Navy
- Controlled by: RAF Fighter Command 1941-43 * No. 10 Group RAF; Fleet Air Arm 1943; RAF Coastal Command 1943- * No. 19 Group RAF
- Condition: Disused

Location
- Shown within Pembrokeshire RAF Angle (the United Kingdom)
- Coordinates: 51°40′28″N 005°05′54″W

Site history
- Built: 1941
- In use: 1941–1943 and 1943–1946 (RAF); 1943 (FAA)
- Fate: Farmland
- Battles/wars: European theatre of World War II

Garrison information
- Occupants: 1944; Officers - 116 (10 WAAF); Other Ranks - 950 (50 WAAF)

Airfield information
- Elevation: 182 feet (55 m) AMSL
Runways
Direction	Length and surface
11/29	1,600 yards (1,463 m) Asphalt concrete and Chipseal
05/23	1,000 yards (914 m) Asphalt concrete and Chipseal
16/34	1,200 yards (1,097 m) Asphalt concrete and Chipseal

Royal Air Force Angle or more commonly RAF Angle is a former Royal Air Force station located on the Angle Peninsula Coast, 8 miles (13 km) west of Pembroke, Pembrokeshire, Wales. It was operational from 1 June 1941 to 11 July 1946, having been used by both the Royal Air Force and the Royal Navy.

The village of Angle is 0.5 miles (0.80 km) north of the airfield, which is located along the coast. Notable landmarks are, Freshwater West beach to the south of the airfield, and the St. Gowans lightship, 8 miles (13 km) south of Linney Head.

The airfield opened as an RAF Fighter Command forward airfield, within No. 10 Group RAF as part of the Fairwood Common Sector. During the previous year the Luftwaffe had attacked Pembroke Docks and Milford Haven with the freedom from any consequences of air defences, causing a furore at high levels of state, and highlighting the need for anti-aircraft operations for the whole of the area.

== History ==
=== Location ===
During 1940 the area around the Angle Peninsula Coast was selected for development into an operational air base, to be located south of the village and community of Angle, Pembrokeshire. Construction of the airfield involved some road closures. Hedges were removed, along with some levelling and drainage work. The site of the airfield covered most of the plateau, and by the summer of 1941 an airfield, although still incomplete, was ready for use.

=== Station design ===
Angle airfield was constructed with six fighter dispersal pens, each with room for four Supermarine Spitfire aircraft, which were located on the south east side, and the watchtower was in one of the corners of the airfield, facing south-west. The airfield had three runways, constructed in a triangular pattern, measuring: 1463 m (4800 ft) long, 914 m (2999 ft) long, and 1097 m (3599 ft) long. Angle had one T2 hangar and four Blister hangars. A battle headquarters was installed and the airfield was defended by a windmill, converted into a pillbox.

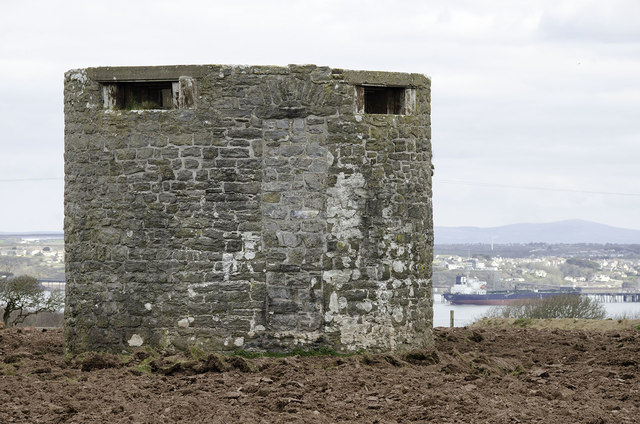
Windmill pillbox remains at Angle

There was no initial accommodation built to house any RAF Officers, it was designed for 106 SNCOs with 126 other ranks. The Women's Auxiliary Air Force accommodation catered for 10 SNCO and 50 other ranks.

=== RAF Fighter Command ===
The airfield opened on the 1 June 1941, designed as a fighter airfield for convoy escort and air patrols. It was initially used by No. 32 Sqn flying Hawker Hurricane Mk.I aircraft, arriving from RAF Pembrey and then relocating in the November to RAF Manston. They were replaced by No. 615 Sqn, moving in the opposite direction from Manston in the same month, which operated Hawker Hurricane Mk.IIc aircraft. On the 1 December 1941, RAF Angle was designated as a forward base under No. 10 Group RAF, Fairwood Common Fighter Command Sector, taking on the responsibility of the air defence for the whole of South and West Wales and the protection of convoys in the Bristol and St George's Channels.

The airfield on the peninsula was a windswept site. The landing area sloped down to the cliff edge of the mouth of the Bristol Channel. Strong gales caused damage to the aircraft servicing hangars; large earth banks were built up to provide some shelter to the aircraft and protect the servicing crews, however, in depth engineering inspections were done at either RAF Fairwood Common or RAF Carew Cheriton.

No. 615 Sqn left for RAF Fairwood Common in January 1942. Several Squadrons followed: No. 312 (Czechoslovak) Sqn equipped with the Supermarine Spitfire Vb aircraft replaced 615 Sqn and operated out of RAF Angle until April. Next to be stationed here was No. 263 Sqn which used the twin-engine Westland Whirlwind I aircraft. 263 Sqn remained until August 1942, when it departed for RAF Colerne. Next came No. 152 Sqn, equipped with Supermarine Spitfire, but left in September. Then from November to January 1943 No. 421 Sqn RCAF occupied the base, operating Supermarine Spitfire Vb. January and February 1943 saw the fighter cover provided by No. 412 Sqn RCAF also flying Supermarine Spitfire Vb.

The next use of the air station saw a detachment of Armstrong Whitworth Whitley aircraft and Airspeed Horsa military gliders stationed at RAF Angle in April 1943, for exercises with the 9th (Eastern and Home Counties) Parachute Battalion.

=== Royal Navy ===
RAF Angle was transferred to the Admiralty, on the 1 May 1943, from No. 19 Group RAF. 794 Naval Air Firing Unit was posted here, conducting target towing duties. with the air station being renamed Royal Naval Air Station Angle (RNAS Angle, also known as HMS Goldcrest). 759 Advanced Flying School sent a detachment here, in July 1943, from RNAS Yeovilton (HMS Heron).

The radio signal communication between the Fleet Air Arm flying units and the control at RNAS Angle, clashed with the Royal Air Force signals between the controls at RAF Coastal Command stations: RAF Pembroke Dock, and RAF Carew Cheriton, and their respective aircraft. This resulted with the need for the Royal Navy to leave the Angle peninsula which had RAF Pembroke Dock on its northern edge.

On 5 September 1943, RAF Dale was transferred to the Admiralty in exchange for RNAS Angle, from No. 19 Group RAF, with the Coastal Command Development Unit moving in. 794 NAS left Angle for Dale, in September and 759 NAS departed Angle, in November 1943.

=== RAF Coastal Command ===
The Coastal Command Development Unit RAF (CCDU) arrived at RAF Angle in September 1943. Its role was to undertake anti-submarine warfare trials. Once these were completed the unit left for RAF Thorney Island in January 1945. The CCDU was joined by the No. 1 Engine Control Demonstration Unit RAF in April 1944. In June it became known as the Engine Control Instructional Flight RAF and also departed in January 1945.

=== Bouncing bomb ===
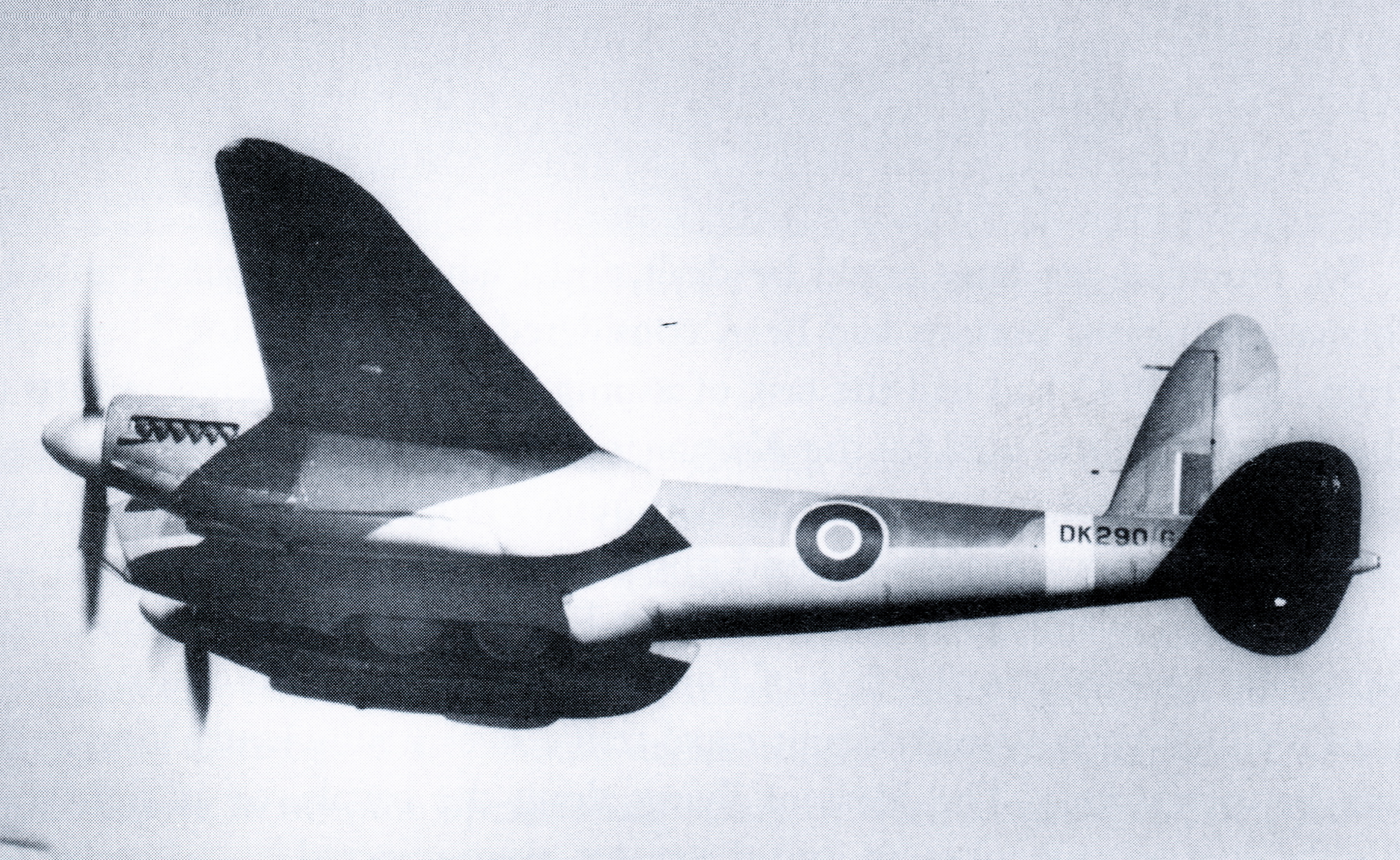
Highball prototype bombs in the modified bomb bay of de Havilland Mosquito DK290/G, as an example of what was used at RAF Angle

During October 1943 RAF Angle was used by specially adapted de Havilland Mosquito aircraft, involved in trials with a new type of depth charge developed by Barnes Wallis, a bouncing bomb code-named Highball. Highball was a spherical design with dimples by Barnes Wallis and two were carried by de Havilland Mosquito aircraft, dropped either singly or in a salvoed pair.

On 6 October 1943, a Mosquito of No. 618 Sqn, took off from RAF Angle, it was flown by Sqn Ldr Longbottom and carried a prototype Highball bouncing bomb. The south portal of Castle Hill (Maenclochog) Tunnel, on the North Pembrokeshire and Fishguard Railway acted as the target for the trial and he managed to get four out of twelve to go through the tunnel, whilst two hit the portal.

== Royal Air Force Operational History ==
=== Air Defence and Convoy Patrols ===
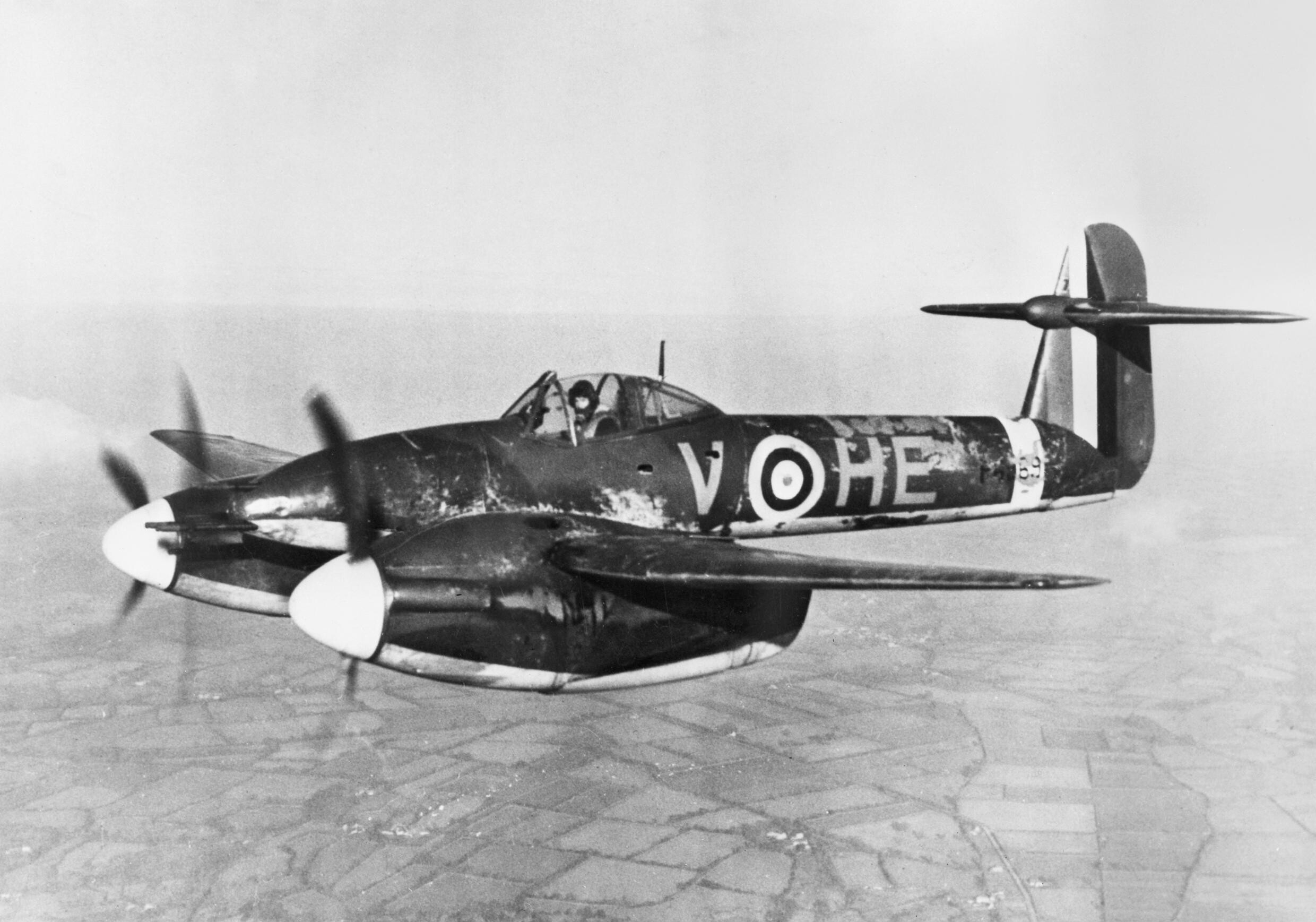
Westland Whirlwind Mk I, of No. 263 Squadron RAF

The initial fighter squadron arrived in June 1941 to provide fighter cover for coastal convoys, and the air defence of Pembroke Dock and the Milford Haven Waterway. No. 236 Squadron RAF, with its Bristol Blenheim twin-engined light bomber aircraft, operating from nearby RAF Carew Cheriton, had previously worked this role, and they were extremely overwhelmed doing it. This started a sequence of squadrons taking it in turns operating from RAF Angle, with one squadron replacing another, up to the beginning of 1943. Hawker Hurricane fighter aircraft were the initial type used, however, Supermarine Spitfire fighter aircraft was most common afterwards, and one squadron operated the Westland Whirlwind, twin-engined, fighter aircraft.

==== 32 Squadron ====
No. 32 Squadron RAF arrived from RAF Pembrey, on the 1 June 1941. On the 4 June the squadron started well, claiming a Dornier Do 17 down, and a possible Heinkel He 111 as well. Then on the 10 June a Junkers Ju 88 was shot down, although one of the two Hawker Hurricane aircraft dog fighting with the Junkers had to land in Ireland. No. 32 Squadron flew up to thirty sorties daily throughout their stay at RAF Angle. Assigned the squadron code GZ, it operated with Hawker Hurricane Mk.I a British single-seat fighter aircraft and was led by Squadron Leader T. Grier, DFC. It continued providing air defence for the next five months, until leaving for RAF Manston on the 26 November 1941.

==== 615 Squadron ====
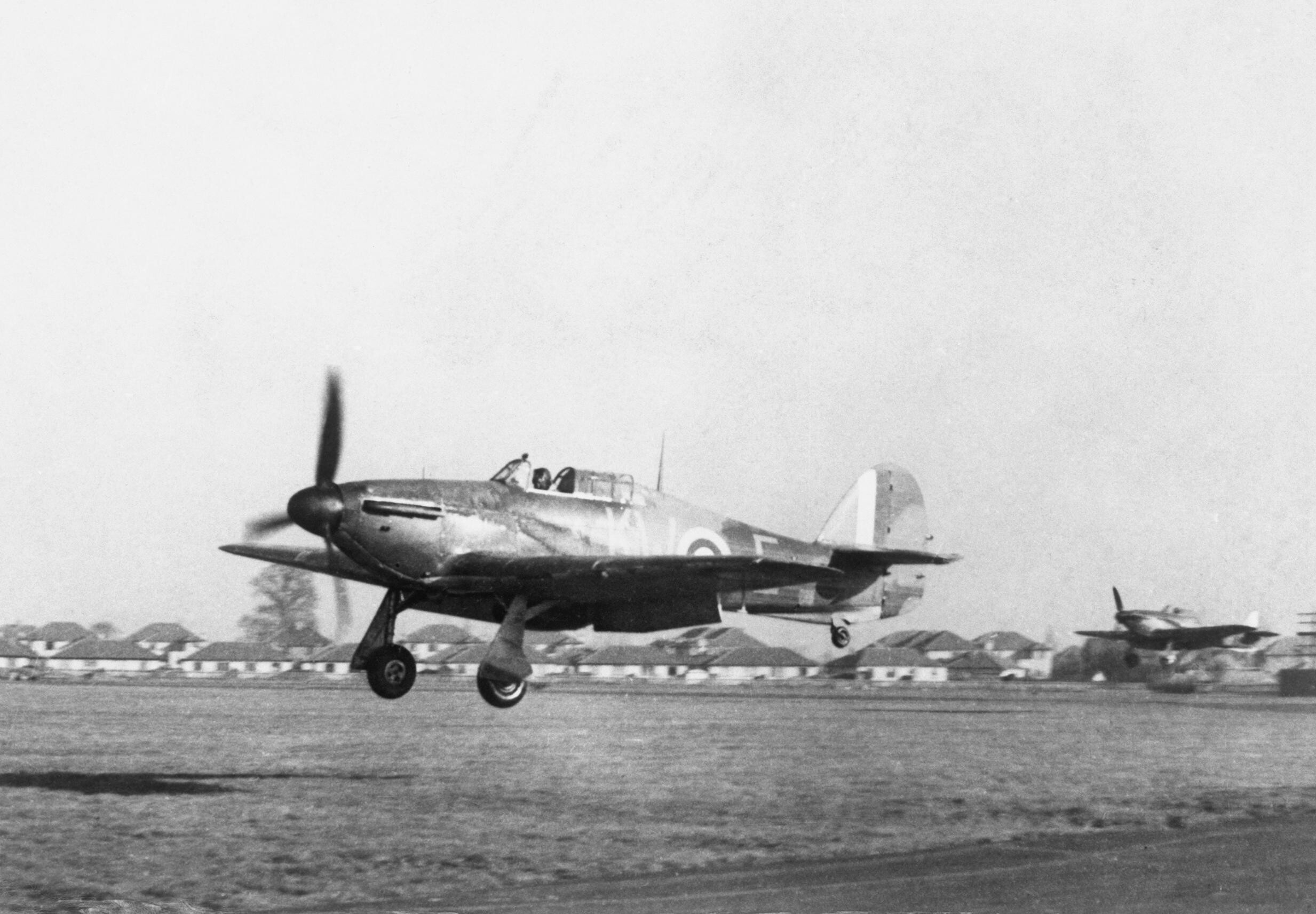
Two Hawker Hurricane aircraft of No. 615 (County of Surrey) Squadron RAF

No. 615 Squadron RAF moved from RAF Manston, on the 27 November 1941. Allocated the squadron code KW, it was equipped with Hawker Hurricane Mk.I & II aircraft. Battle of Britain pilot, Squadron Leader D. E. Gilliam, DSO, DFC and Bar, AFC, was the CO. The squadron's main role was performing shipping and convoy patrols over the Irish Sea, which involved hunting for Luftwaffe aircraft, along with escorting allied shipping and bomber aircraft. Operating with the long-range Hawker Hurricane IIb fighter, the squadron badly damaged a Junkers Ju 88, three days after arriving at RAF Angle. In December they provided air cover for daytime bombing attacks on Brest, using RAF Perranporth for forward aircraft refuelling. Also, in December, aircraft from the squadron located a Royal Navy destroyer off The Smalls, which had been damaged by Luftwaffe aircraft, and assisted the rescue ships, which towed the destroyer into Milford Haven. No. 615 Squadron relocated to RAF Fairwood Common, on the 10 January 1942.

==== 312 Squadron ====
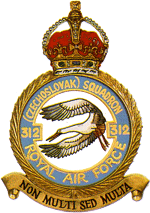
No. 312 (Czechoslovak) Squadron RAF

No. 312 (Czechoslovak) Squadron RAF, a Czechoslovak-manned fighter squadron, arrived at RAF Angle, on the 24 January 1942. It carried the squadron code DU. Its CO was Squadron Leader H. Bird-Wilson, DFC, and it was tasked with convoy patrols, as well as providing air defence cover for Milford Haven Waterway. While at RAF Angle the unit flew 231 hours of operations and had several encounters with the Luftwaffe. It was equipped with Supermarine Spitfire Vb aircraft and on the 16 February was credited with a Junkers Ju 88 aircraft kill. The aircraft were also fitted with bomb racks enabling ground attack exercises with the Army. No. 312 Squadron left for RAF Fairwood Common on the 18 April 1942.

==== 263 Squadron ====
The Westland Whirlwind twin-engined Fighter aircraft equipped No. 263 Squadron RAF, moved from RAF Fairwood Common, on the 18 April 1942. It used the squadron code HE. The unit was led by Squadron Leader R. S. Woodward, DFC. It provided convoy protection in the Irish Sea and was also part of bombing raids across occupied France. Ten Whirlwind aircraft went on detachment to RAF Portreath to support Ramrod missions. The squadron lost two pilots when two of its Whirlwind aircraft were shot down by Messerschmitt Bf 109 aircraft of the Luftwaffe over France, on 23 July, during a Rhubarb raid (fighter sweep). The squadron left for RAF Colerne on the 18 August 1942.

==== 152 Squadron ====
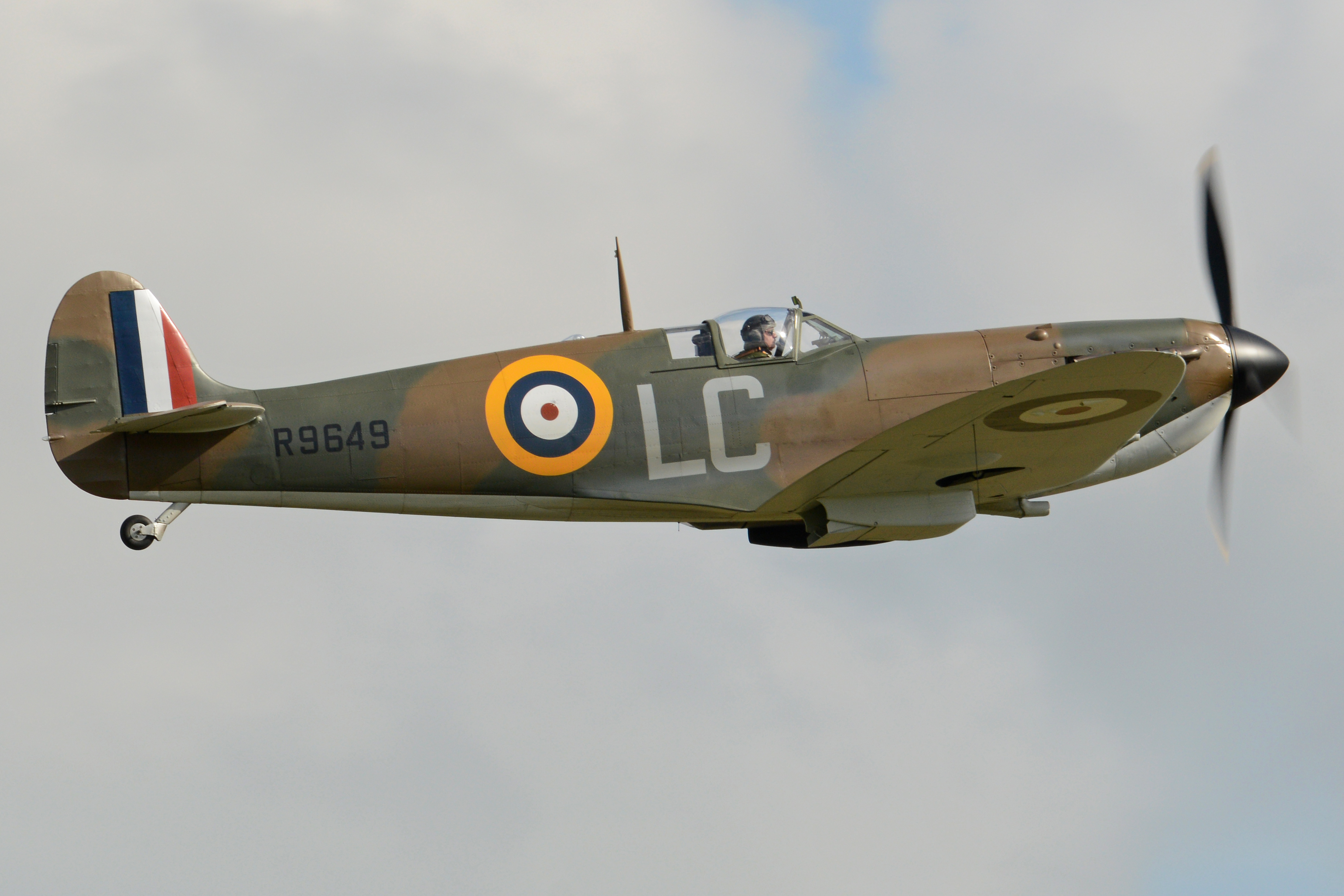
Supermarine Spitfire Vb ‘R9649 - LC’ (G-CISV-EP122), an example of the type of fighter aircraft commonly seen operating from RAF Angle

No. 152 Squadron RAF, known as No. 152 (Hyderabad) Squadron RAF equipped with Supermarine Spitfire Vb & Vc aircraft arrived from RAF Eglington, on the 16 August 1942. It was given the squadron code UM. Starting from the 17 August the squadron flew from 5.30 a.m. to 9.30 p.m. On the 23 August a Junkers Ju 88 was shot down. The squadron lost two Supermarine Spitfire aircraft on the 26 August, apparently colliding with each other over the sea in bad weather. The unit undertook convoy patrols, but was only at RAF Angle for a short time, leaving for RAF Collyweston on the 27 September 1942.

==== 421 Squadron ====
No. 421 Squadron RCAF was a Canadian fighter squadron. It arrived at RAF Angle on the 26 October 1942 from RAF Fairwood Common. The squadron operated with Supermarine Spitfire Vb aircraft. It received the squadron code AU. The squadron spent a fortnight at RAF Zeals from the beginning of November, returning to RAF Angle, then a week at the beginning of December at RAF Charmy Down. Its dual role was to provide Irish Sea convoy fighter cover and local air defence, under the leadership of Squadron Leader F. E. Green, DFC. The squadron relocated to RAF Kenley on the 29 January 1943.

==== 412 Squadron ====
No. 412 Squadron RCAF a Royal Canadian Air Force fighter squadron, operated out of RAF Angle for a short time, it provided the air cover between the 29 January and the 8 February 1943, equipped with Supermarine Spitfire Vb and led by Squadron Leader F. W. Kelly, they were designated with the squadron code VZ.The squadron transferred from RAF Redhill but a week and a half later it departed for RAF Fairwood Common

=== Coastal Command Development Unit ===
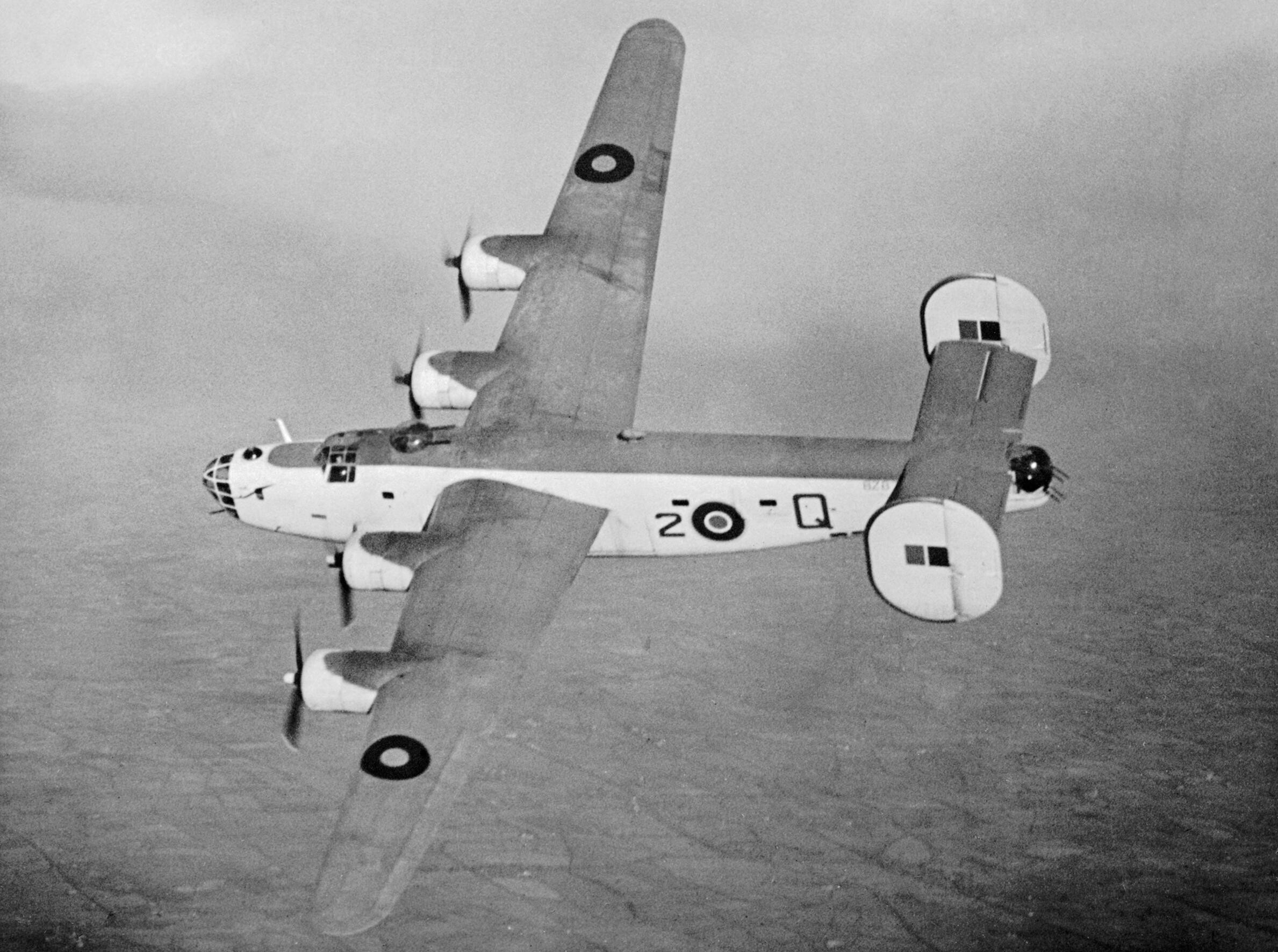
A Royal Air Force Coastal Command Consolidated Liberator GR Mark V, an example of the aircraft used by the CCDU

In September 1943 the RAF and Coastal Command Development Unit RAF (CCDU) relocated from RAF Dale to RAF Angle. The units initial purpose was to undertake service trials of all radar equipment such as air-to-surface-vessel (ASV) radar to assist RAF Coastal Command operations. It was required to investigate the tactics for the use of all types of radar equipment in RAF Coastal Command aircraft, but its role changed to cover both service and tactical trials of all RAF Coastal Command aircraft and equipment, including trials of anti-submarine warfare equipment and techniques, essentially submarine detection and destruction from the air. One of the key tests performed while at RAF Angle was to measure audibility of aircraft from submarines on the surface. Utilising the Leigh light (L/L) and radar search, one of the trials carried out was to see how close to a submarine different aircraft could get before they were audibly detected. The unit operated a variety of aircraft types to carry out these trials:

- Consolidated Liberator GR Mk.V - one aircraft
- Handley Page Halifax GR.II - one aircraft
- Vickers Wellington B Mark X - two aircraft
- Vickers Warwick GR Mk II - one aircraft
- Bristol Beaufighter TF Mk.X - two aircraft
- Percival Proctor - a number of aircraft for communications flights

A lot of the evaluation was with ASV radar. In the Bristol Channel the unit utilised lightships and other small Merchant ships to evaluate their equipment and tactics (as these were thought to give similar returns to partially submerged submarines). Eventually these types of ships could be detected 6 miles (10 km) away. From this the unit then developed a low visibility airstrike method, which also included ASV radar-led blind bombing. With the trials completed the unit left for RAF Thorney Island. It disbanded on the 1 January 1945 transferring away from RAF Angle, moving to RAF Thorney Island, and re-forming to become the Air-Sea Warfare Development Unit from the 14 January.

=== Other Units ===
==== Engine Control ====
No. 1 Engine Control Demonstration Unit RAF, operated out of RAF Angle from April 1944. The unit was equipped with Vickers Wellington aircraft. Two months after arriving it disbanded on the 17 June 1944, and reformed as the Engine Control Instructional Flight RAF. The flight’s role was development of knowledge for improved handling of aircraft engines. These techniques were then applied operationally by pilots and aircrews, within front line flights and squadrons.It remained for the following six months and then departed RAF Angle in January 1945.

== Royal Navy Operational History ==
=== Naval Air Firing Unit ===
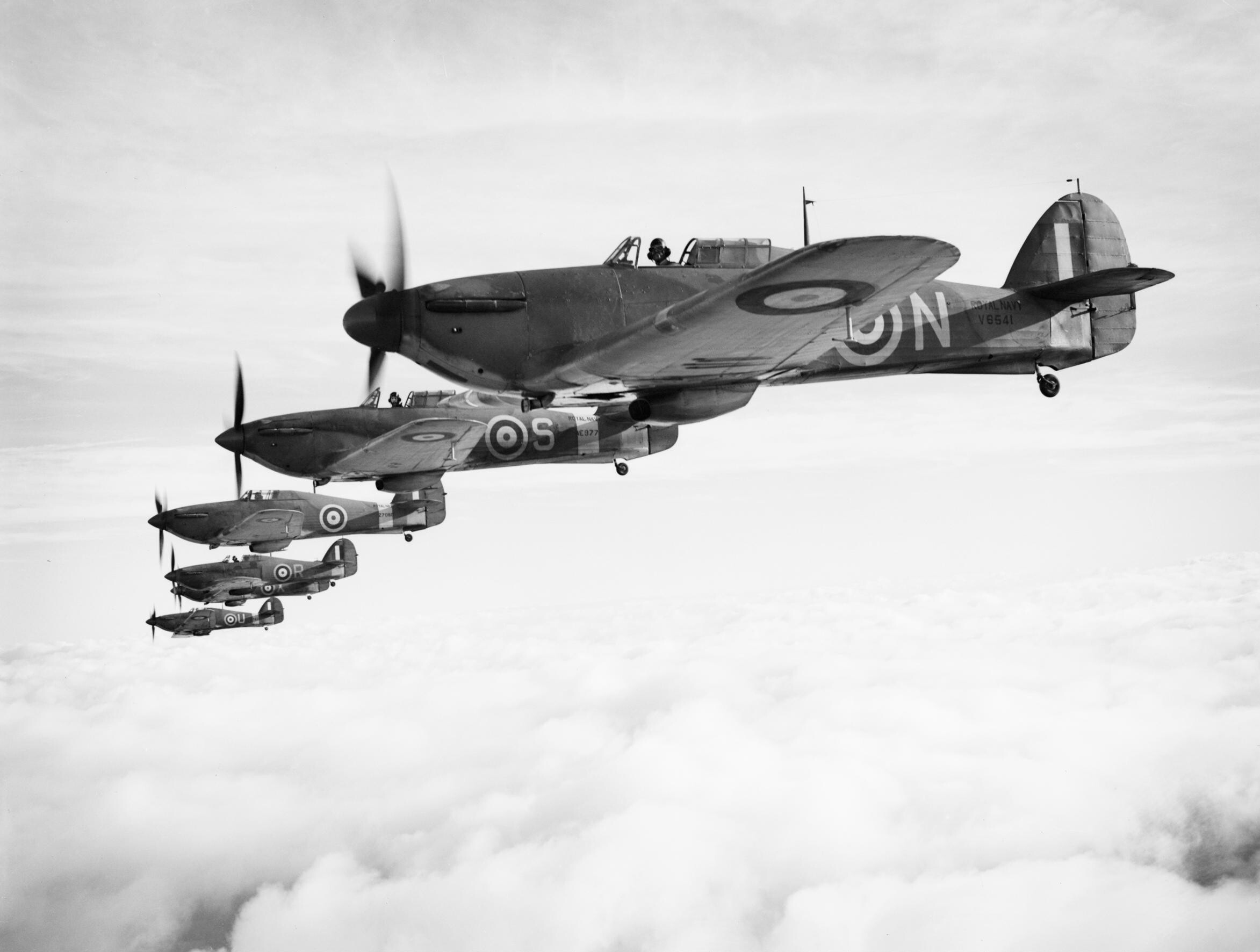
Hawker Sea Hurricanes, an example of the type commonly seen over Angle while the Naval Air Firing Unit was based there during 1943

Initially an Air Target Towing Unit, it was retitled Naval Air Firing Unit upon the move from Yeovilton to Angle, also acquiring its own fighter aircraft for pupils to be taught the gunnery section of the Fighter School course.

==== 794 Squadron ====
794 Naval Air Squadron was the Naval Air Firing Unit. It moved here from RNAS Yeovilton (HMS Heron), on the 1 July 1943. Its role was to provide target-towing for Royal Navy warships, and was responsible for pilot training. At RNAS Angle it operated with sixteen Hawker Sea Hurricane single-seat fighter aircraft, a navalised Hawker Hurricane, four Boulton Paul Defiant TT. III, a British interceptor two-seat turret fighter aircraft constructed as a dedicated turret-less target tug, eight Miles Martinet TT. I, a target tug aircraft, and four Miles Master II, a two-seat monoplane advanced trainer aircraft, working with the Fighter School from RNAS Yeovilton. The squadron moved to RNAS Dale (HMS Goldcrest) on the 10 September 1943.

==== 759 Squadron ====
759 Naval Air Squadron was the Advanced Flying Training Squadron. From the 1 July 1943 the squadron operated a detachment here from RNAS Yeovilton, to support 794 NAS and the Naval Air Firing Unit. It was equipped with Hawker Sea Hurricane and Fairey Fulmar, a carrier-borne reconnaissance and fighter aircraft. The detachment ended and returned to RNAS Yeovilton on the 22 November 1943.

== Incidents ==
=== Short Sunderland T9114 ===
On the 29 May 1943 a Short Sunderland of No. 461 Sqn RAAF made a successful forced landing at RAF Angle. It had considerable damage to its hull and was unable to land on the water at RAF Pembroke Dock. Having rescued the survivors of two crashed aircraft: Short Sunderland JM675 and Armstrong Whitworth Whitley bomber BD282, the crews were passed to the Free French destroyer La Combattante. The damage was sustained while taking off in heavy seas. Pilot Officer Gordon Singleton performed the first ever ‘dry’ airfield landing by a Sunderland, with no further casualties. In 2008, Singleton unveiled a newly restored memorial marking the site of the former airfield and his landing there. After his death in 2013, his ashes were interred on the site.

=== Hawker Hurricane Z5222 ===
On 25 August 1941 a Hawker Hurricane of No. 32 Squadron RAF collided into some ground equipment, recorded as a steamroller, while attempting to land following a night flying exercise. The pilot survived the crash.

== Closure ==
RAF Angle was controlled by RAF Coastal Command, however, any flying on the south of Milford Haven was controlled by RAF Pembroke Dock due to a dispersed flying boat flare path in Angle Bay and nighttime flying co-ordination from a single control. RAF Angle was closed on the 1 January 1946, it remained inactive and parented by RAF Pembroke Dock, then in 1953 it was relinquished.

== Current use ==
The site has reverted to farming and only a few huts and the perimeter track are left.

== Memorials ==
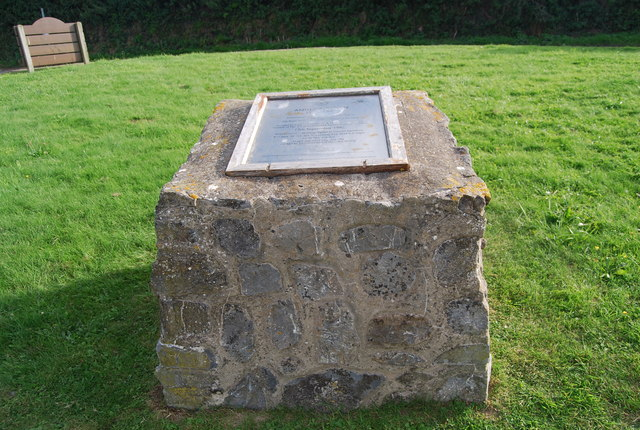
Stone cairn with memorial plaque

Stone cairn in west angle bay, dedicated on the 12 September 1992.

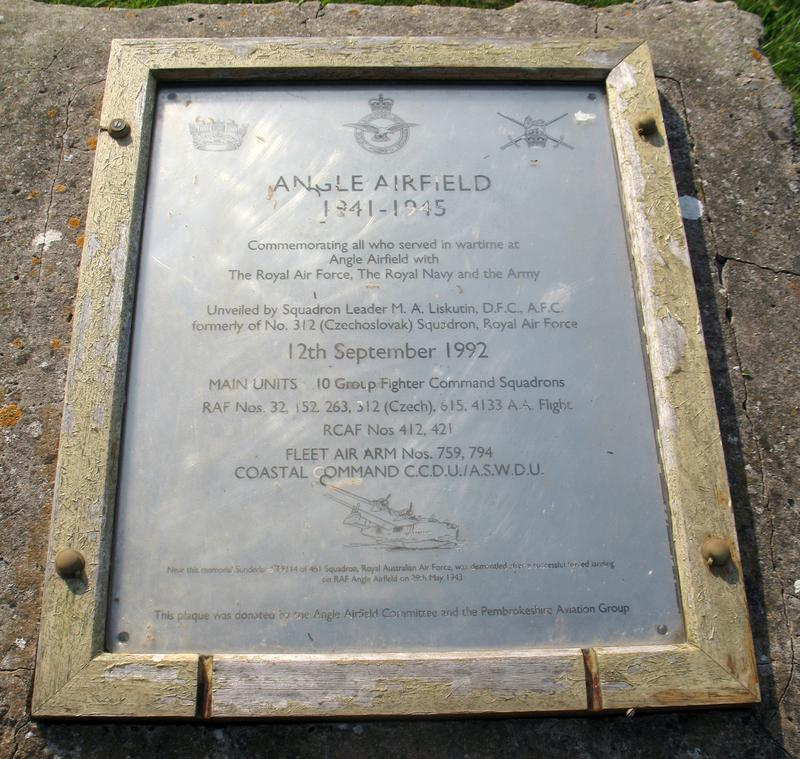
Angle Airfield Memorial Plaque

Inscription

Angle Airfield

1941 - 1945

Commemorating all who served in wartime at Angle airfield with the Royal Air Force, the Royal Navy and the Army

Unveiled by Squadron Leader M. A. Liskutin D.F.C., A.F.C. formerly of No. 312 (Czechoslovak) Squadron Royal Air Force

12th September 1992

Main Units 10 Group Fighter Command Squadrons RAF Nos. 32, 152, 263, 312(CZECH), 615, 4133 A.A. Flight

RCAF Nos 412, 421

FLEET AIR ARM Nos. 759, 794

COASTAL COMMAND C.C.D.U./A.S.W.D.U.

Near this memorial Sunderland T9114 of 461 Squadron, Royal Australian Air Force, was dismantled after a successful forced landing on RAF Angle airfield on 29th May 1943

This plaque was donated by the Angle Airfield Committee and the Pembrokeshire Aviation Group

== See also ==
- List of former Royal Air Force stations
- List of Royal Air Force aircraft squadrons
- List of air stations of the Royal Navy
- List of Fleet Air Arm aircraft squadrons
- Angle, Pembrokeshire
