= Angle, Pembrokeshire =

Village, parish and community in Pembrokeshire, Wales

Angle: Welsh: Angl
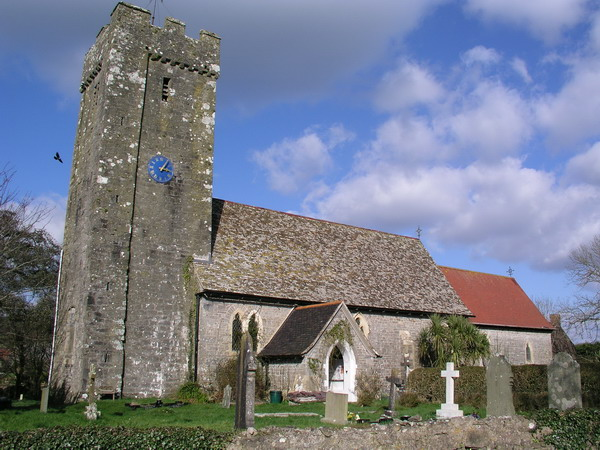
- Saint Mary's Church, Angle

- Location within Pembrokeshire
- Population: 337 (2011)
- OS grid reference: SM8602
- Community: Angle
- Principal area: Pembrokeshire
- Country: Wales
- Sovereign state: United Kingdom
- Post town: Pembroke
- Postcode district: SA71
- Dialling code: 01646
- Police: Dyfed-Powys
- Fire: Mid and West Wales
- Ambulance: Welsh
- UK Parliament: Mid and South Pembrokeshire
- Senedd Cymru – Welsh Parliament: Ceredigion Penfro
- List of places UK Wales Pembrokeshire 51.6847°N 5.0919°W Map of the community

Angle (Welsh: Angl) is a village, parish and community on the southern side of the entrance to the Milford Haven Waterway in Pembrokeshire, Wales. The village school has closed, as has the village shop (with a post office).but the building is in construction so it could reopen in the near future as of summer 2026 There is a bus link to Pembroke railway station.

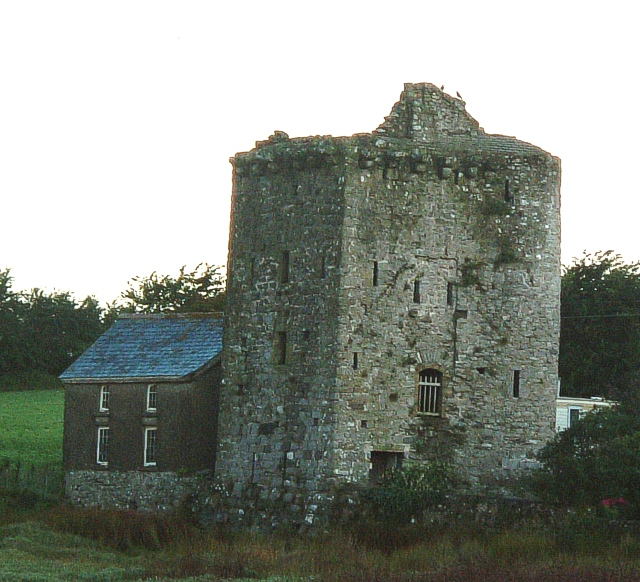
Pele tower at Castle Farm, Angle

The Sailors' Chapel, a Grade I listed building, is in the church graveyard. At Castle Farm, there is a Pele tower and above Castle Bay there are the remains of an Iron Age fort. On the headland there are visible remains of medieval strip farming.

== Angle Bay ==
Angle Bay is a wilderness of mud and sand making it a good home for invertebrates, and is popular with many bird species such as dunlin, grey plover, common redshank, Eurasian oystercatcher and Eurasian curlew. The nearby Kilpaison Marsh has been a breeding area for Cetti's warbler in the reed beds and scrub. West Angle Bay is a Site of Special Scientific Interest, with rock pools which are home to the rare cushion starfish, and also a sandy beach .

The Angle Lifeboat Station received RNLI silver medals in 1894 for rescuing the crew of the Loch Shiel from rocks near Thorn Island. The ship had been carrying a cargo of whisky and beer.

== St. Mary's church ==
The church which stands in the centre of the village, is thought to have been built in the thirteenth century with the tower added in the fifteenth century. The church's grounds include a number of graves of victims of the Japanese ship Hirano Maru that was torpedoed locally during World War I; the memorial was re-dedicated in 2018. The church contains memorials to the Mirehouse family of The Hall, Angle, as well as ancient monuments to the families of Ferrers and Dawes of Bangeston.

=== Sailors' Chapel ===
The Sailors' Chapel, a Grade I listed building dedicated to St. Anthony, is in the church graveyard. Beneath the chapel is a crypt where, until the early twentieth century, many anonymous seamen's bodies found on the coastline were readied for burial.

The chapel is a small, single-cell vaulted building above a raised and vaulted crypt. It was founded in the 15th century (1447) by Edward de Shirburn a "knight of Nangle". It was restored in 1853, again by Elizabeth Mirehouse in 1862, and rededicated in 1929. Originally a receiving place, or charnel-house, for the corpses of drowned sailors, it became a chapel of rest in the 20th century.

Constructed of coarse masonry under a modern tiled roof with a Celtic cross finial, the chapel has Victorian stained glass windows, one of which depicts the miracle of Christ walking upon the sea. There is a stone altar.

== History ==
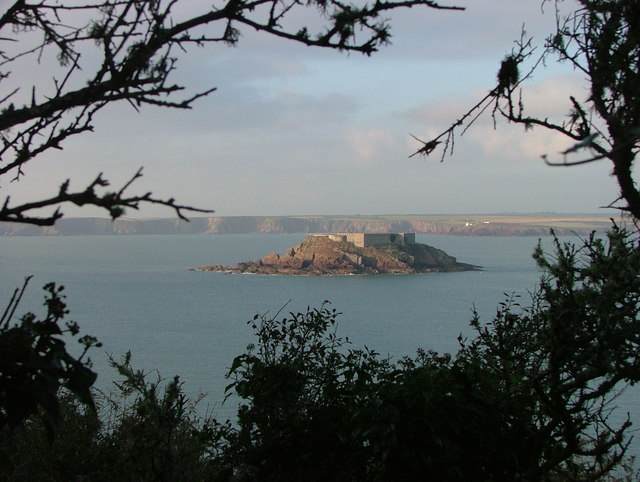
Thorne Island, Angle

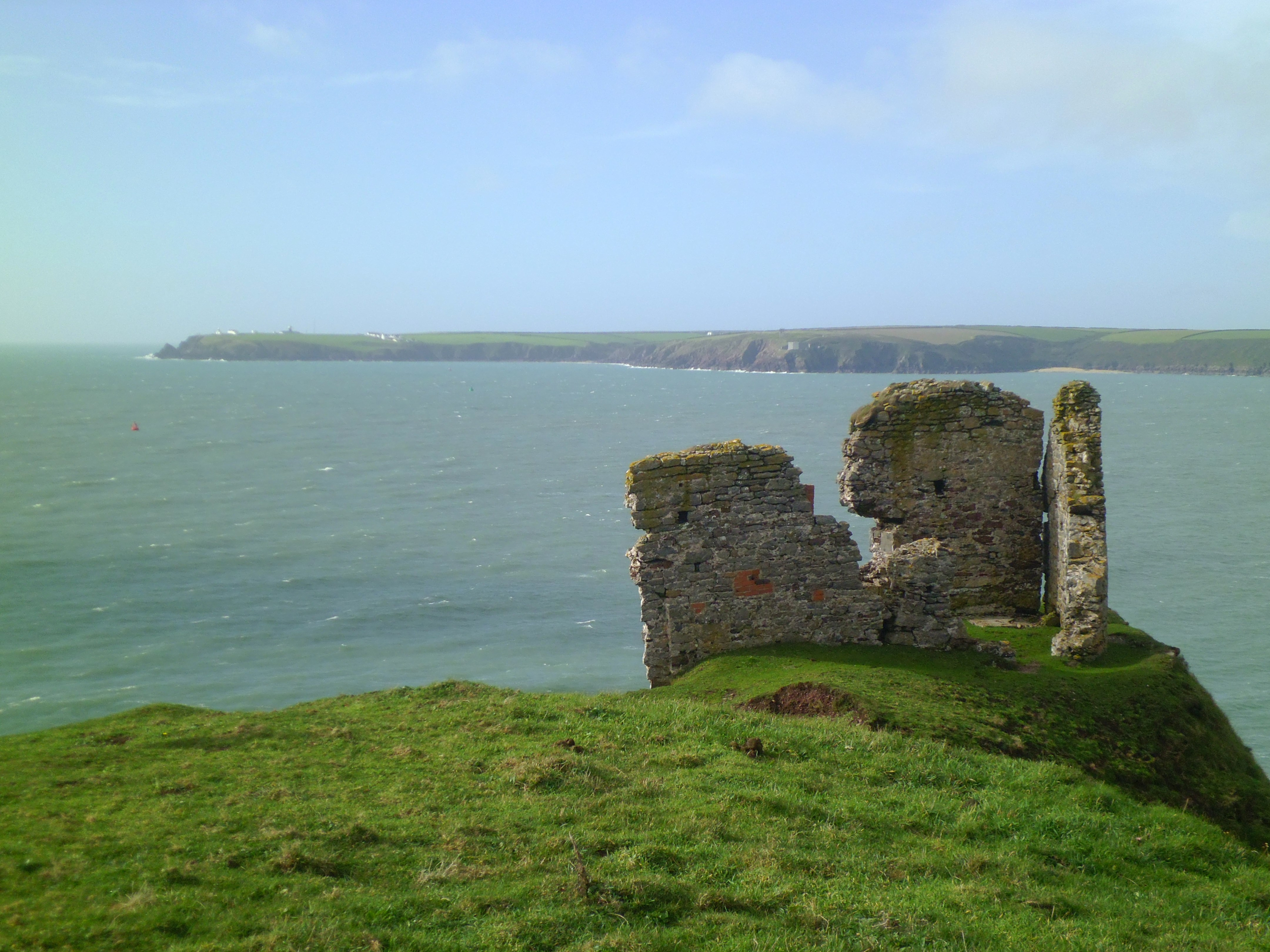
Remains of the East Blockhouse in Angle, looking out to the site of the West Blockhouse at Dale

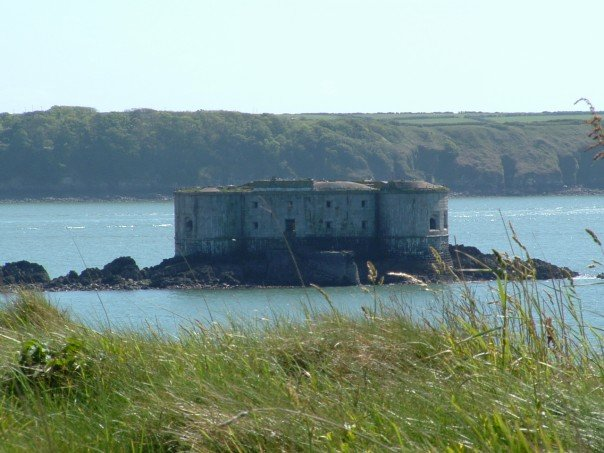
Stack Rock Fort, Angle

A Pele tower was built by Robert de Shirburn in the 14th century. It is within Castle Farm but can be easily accessed. The castle may have been built by the Shirburn family during the time of Owain Glyndŵr. A French army landed at Angle in 1405 to assist Glyndŵr. Some sources see the castle as a simple pele tower but others see evidence of a moat and another tower and regard what survives as being the remains of a larger castle.

In the 19th century, it was reported that 388 people lived in the village with the women involved in plaiting straw for bonnets and mats, whilst the men would trawl for oysters when they were in season.

In the 1860s, several forts were constructed around the Milford Haven Waterway—Angle has four—Thorne Island, East Blockhouse Battery, Chapel Bay and Stack Rock Fort. They were part of a series of forts built around the British coast at the behest of Lord Palmerston following a Royal Commission.

The chief landowners in Angle for many generations were the Mirehouse family recently lord Mirehouse died in 2025 and the mansion is up for sale but not the estate ; descendants of John Mirehouse of Brownslade, Pembrokeshire, who purchased the Angle estate from the Kinner family for £29,000 shortly after 1800. The family later made The Hall its main seat after extensive refurbishment in the 1830s. John Mirehouse was appointed High Sheriff of Pembrokeshire in 1831, and Lt. Col. Richard Walter Byrd Mirehouse served as High Sheriff in 1886.

By 1886, John Mirehouse's descendant, Lt. Col. Richard Walter Byrd Levett of Staffordshire had taken the surname of his mother's family and settled in the village. Lt. Col. Mirehouse lived at The Hall, where his descendants continue to live today, and where he embarked on making improvements to the estate and the village. This included constructing a number of buildings; including the castellated, eclectic, colonial-style Globe Hotel; once the main village hotel and still a prominent feature in this Victorian estate village.

The Mirehouse estate included Cheveralton Farm and Hubberton Farm. The family also owned the Golden Estate in Pembroke and Wallaston Farm in Pembroke St. Mary. Councillor John Allen-Mirehouse of Angle formerly served as Pembrokeshire County Council Deputy Leader.

During World War II, RAF Angle was located on the Angle Peninsula Coast. It was operational from 1 December 1941 to the 1950s, having been used by both the Royal Air Force and the Royal Navy.

The sheltered beach at West Angle Bay has been designated a Site of Special Scientific Interest; the rock pools are home to a small green starfish called Asterina phylactica. The starfish was only formally identified in 1979.

On 15 February 1996, the oil tanker Sea Empress grounded at the entrance to the Milford Haven Waterway, spilling 72,000 tonnes of crude oil. The coastline around Angle was severely damaged. The effects of the oil spill lasted several years and restoration cost £60 million.

== Lifeboat Station ==
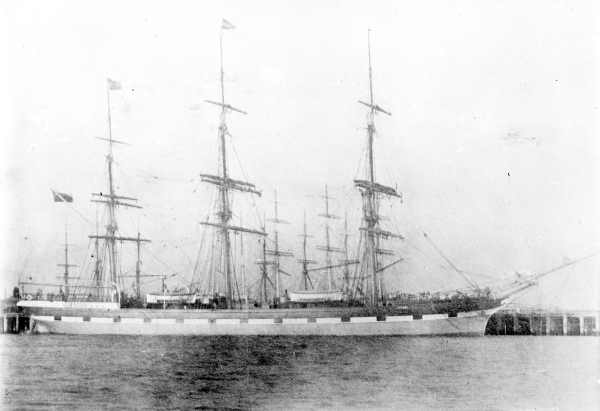
The Loch Shiel

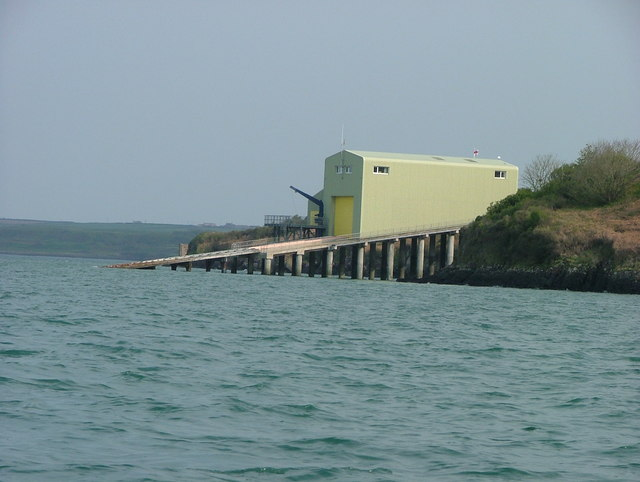
RNLI Lifeboat house, Angle

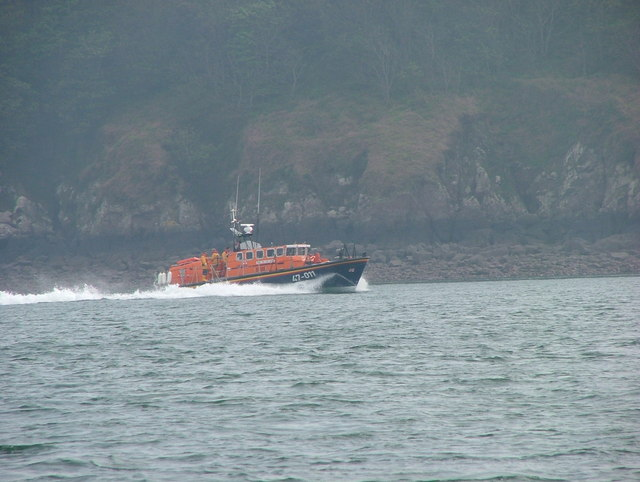
The Lady Rank, Chapel Bay, Angle (2007)

A lifeboat station was established here in 1868; since then there have been a number of lifeboats and boathouses. The crew has received numerous awards, including seven silver and five bronze RNLI medals. In 2020 there were two lifeboats, the Tamar-class class Mark Mason and a D-class (IB1) inshore lifeboat SuperG II.

One notable rescue was in 1894, when 27 (some say 33) people were saved from the 1878-built Loch Shiel which had run on to rocks off Thorn Island. Three RNLI silver medals were awarded, including one to Thomas Rees, who is buried in the churchyard at St Mary's. The rescue is described as Wales' "Whisky Galore". The Loch Shiel was carrying goods from Scotland to Adelaide and included gunpowder, beer and 7,500 (some say 7,000) cases of Glasgow whisky. The cargo was partially recovered by Customs, but some of the bottles are still amongst the wreck and are described as "undrinkable". One local man drank himself to death on the 100 proof whisky. In 1999, bottles of beer from the wreck were auctioned for £1,000 per bottle.

Over the years Angle Lifeboat station has had a number of distinguished coxswains. James Watkins retired in 1946 after 24 years service as coxswain and 13 years as second coxswain. In this time, he had been awarded an RNLI silver medal, and both a bronze medal and a second award clasp. In 1973 Coxswain William John Rees Holmes was awarded a bronze medal and a second award clasp in 1979. In 1997 coxswain Jeremy R. Rees was awarded a bronze medal.

In April 2009, a new £2.2 million Tamar class lifeboat replaced the previous Tyne class boat. Fund raising started in 2006 in Pembrokeshire and Birmingham, while a single £1.6 million donation from the Grand Lodge of Mark Master Masons, a branch of the Free Masons in London, enabled final purchase of the boat.

== Notable people ==
- Geoffrey Wainwright MBE, FSA, FRSA (1937–2017), a British archaeologist specialising in prehistory; born in Angle.
