= Air-Sea Warfare Development Unit RAF =

Royal Air Force Coastal Command Unit

Air-Sea Warfare Development Unit ~~Coastal Command Development Unit~~ ~~Coastal Command Tactical Development Unit~~
- Active: 1940–1970
- Country: United Kingdom
- Branch: Royal Air Force
- Role: Air-Sea Warfare Research and Development
- Part of: RAF Coastal Command

Insignia
- Identification Markings: P9 (1945 - 1951); F (1951 - 1956); Nil (1956 - 1970)

Air-Sea Warfare Development Unit RAF (ASWDU) was a research and development unit of the Royal Air Force, within RAF Coastal Command, it was operational from December 1940 and disbanded in April 1970.

== History ==
=== Coastal Command Tactical Development Unit ===
On the 22 October 1940, the Coastal Command Tactical Development Unit was formed at RAF Carew Cheriton. It was equipped with Armstrong Whitworth Whitley V, a British medium bomber aircraft, Lockheed Hudson I, an American light bomber and coastal reconnaissance aircraft, Bristol Beaufort I, a British twin-engined torpedo bomber and Vickers Wellington IA, a British twin-engined, long-range medium bomber.

The unit was short lived with this identity and after two months it lost the Tactical from the title. On the 30 December 1940, the unit disbanded but immediately reformed, redesignating as the Coastal Command Development Unit.

=== Coastal Command Development Unit ===
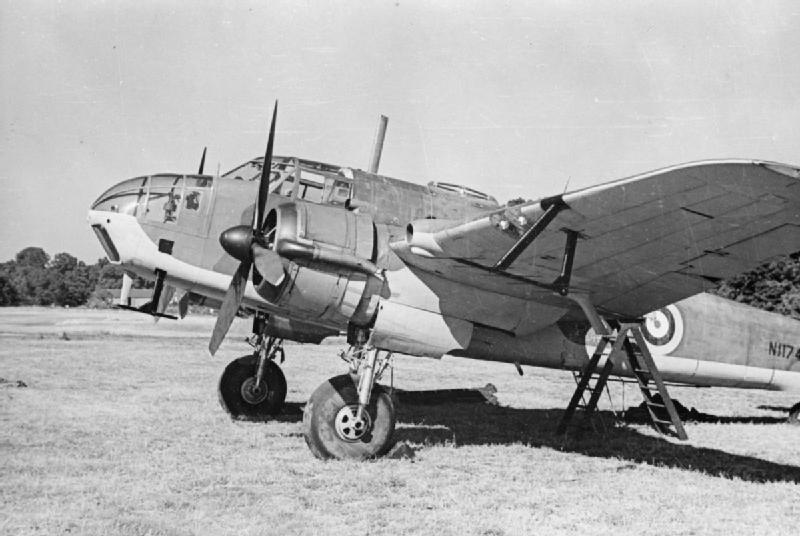
Bristol Beaufort Mark I, N1174, of the Coastal Command Development Unit based at Carew Cheriton, fitted with ASV Mark II radar, while undergoing trials. The transmitter antenna is the black object mounted under the nose; the receiver is the much larger black antenna fitted under the wing.

For the initial radars to be effective, operational techniques and skilled operatives were required. The Coastal Command Development Unit undertook service trials of all radar equipment such as ASV (air-to-surface-vessel) radar for RAF Coastal Command operations. Although it had its own aircraft, it also used flying boats from RAF Pembroke Dock, a Short Sunderland, a British flying boat patrol bomber, was used fitted with ASV Mk. I for the first trial, and it was soon realised the value of the CCDU, therefore, its role changed to cover both service and tactical trials of all RAF Coastal Command aircraft and equipment.

In January 1941, two Vickers Wellington were used to investigate into the use of bomb and depth charges for attacks on submarines and surface vessels by night with the aid of parachute lights, and later with Leigh Lights. The unit operated out of RAF Carew Chriton for around twelve months before moving to RAF Ballykelly in December 1941. Around six months later it then moved to RAF Tain, during June 1942, and remained there for almost a year.

In April 1943, the Unit took over RAF Dale relocating from RAF Tain. In September 1943, as part of the swap between the Royal Air Force and Royal Navy with Dale and Angle airfields, the Unit moved to RAF Angle One of the key tests performed while at RAF Angle was to measure audibility of aircraft from submarines on the surface. Utilising Leigh Light (L/L) and radar search, it carried out trials to see how close to a submarine the different aircraft types the unit used could get, before they were audibly detected.

=== Air-Sea Warfare Development Unit ===
On 14 January 1945, the Air-Sea Warfare Development Unit formed at RAF Thorney Island by redesignating the Coastal Command Development Unit. The role of the ASDWU was to increase efficiency in maritime operations by carrying out trials on the latest equipment. It also contributed to the development through collaboration with other research and development establishments. At the end of 1944, a similar unit was set up in Ceylon (Sri Lanka) to conduct trials of equipment supplied to South East Asia Command, lasting around twelve months.

The unit moved to RAF Ballykelly in May 1948 and along with the trials work it also provided aircrew training for operational squadrons. It moved to RAF St Mawgan during May 1951, and remained there for the next seven years, before returning to RAF Ballykelly in September 1958. While at RAF St Mawgan it operated the Bristol Sycamore helicopter, between 1952 and 1955, for various trials.

The Air Sea War Development Unit disbanded on 1 April 1970, at RAF Ballykelly, when control of all trials work for the Hawker Siddeley Nimrod maritime patrol aircraft fleet was assumed by the Central Trials and Tactical Organisation.

== Aircraft operated ==
The Air-Sea Warfare Development Unit was equipped with numerous types and variants of aircraft:

- Supermarine Sea Otter I amphibious aircraft
- de Havilland Tiger Moth II biplane trainer aircraft
- Lockheed Hudson IIIA light bomber, maritime patrol and coastal reconnaissance aircraft
- Consolidated Liberator VI & VIII heavy bomber
- Vickers Wellington XIII & XIV long range medium bomber
- Vickers Warwick I, II & V air-sea rescue and maritime reconnaissance aircraft
- Percival Proctor III radio trainer and communications aircraft
- General Aircraft Hamilcar I military glider
- Hawker Typhoon IB fighter-bomber aircraft
- Handley Page Halifax II & III heavy bomber
- Bristol Beaufighter X multi-role aircraft
- Consolidated Catalina IVB flying boat and amphibious aircraft
- de Havilland Mosquito VI multirole combat aircraft
- Avro Anson XII & XIX multi-role aircraft
- Sikorsky Hoverfly I helicopter
- Short Sunderland V flying boat patrol bomber
- Avro Lancaster III heavy bomber
- Bristol Brigand TF. 1 anti-shipping/ground attack/dive bomber aircraft
- Avro Shackleton GR.1, MR. 1, MR. 1A, MR.2 & MR. 3 long-range maritime patrol aircraft
- Bristol Sycamore HR. 12 rescue and anti-submarine helicopter

== Royal Air Force Stations ==
The Coastal Command Development Unit and then the Air-Sea Warfare Development Unit, operated from a number of Royal Air Force stations, throughout the UK:

- Coastal Command Development Unit
  - RAF Carew Cheriton (October 1940 - December 1941) (includes Coastal Command Tactical Development Unit)
  - RAF Ballykelly (December 1941 - June 1942)
  - RAF Tain (June 1942 - April 1943)
  - RAF Dale (April 1943 - September 1943)
  - RAF Angle (September 1943 - January 1945)
- Air-Sea Warfare Development Unit
  - RAF Thorney Island (January 1945 - May 1948)
  - RAF Ballykelly (May 1948 - May 1951)
  - RAF St Mawgan (May 1951 - September 1958)
  - RAF Ballykelly (September 1958 - April 1970)

== See also ==
- RAF Coastal Command
- List of Royal Air Force schools
