= RNAS Ballykelly =

Former Royal Naval Air Station in County Londonderry, Northern Ireland

RNAS Ballykelly HMS Sealion Ballykelly Aerodrome
- IATA: none; ICAO: none

Summary
- Airport type: Military
- Owner: Ministry of Defence
- Operator: Royal Navy
- Location: Ballykelly, County Londonderry
- Built: 1962
- In use: 1962-1971
- Elevation AMSL: 13 ft (4.0 m)
- Coordinates: 55°03′39″N 007°00′59″W

Map
- Location in Northern Ireland RNAS Ballykelly (the United Kingdom)

Runways
Direction	Length		Surface
Direction	ft	m	Surface
00/00	0	0	Asphalt
00/00	0	0	Asphalt
00/00	0	0	Asphalt

Royal Naval Air Station Ballykelly, commonly known as RNAS Ballykelly; (commissioned HMS Sealion), is a former Royal Naval Air Station near Ballykelly, County Londonderry, Northern Ireland

== History ==
Opened in 1941 as RAF Ballykelly as a RAF Coastal Command base. The runway was extended in 1943 but closed at the end of the Second World War in 1945. In 1947 it was re-opened with the Royal Air Force (RAF) Joint Anti-Submarine School training flight. It closed again briefly in 1951 to allow works to be carried out for the arrival of the Avro Shackleton in 1952.

Further work was carried out in 1962 to prepare for the arrival of displaced Royal Navy (RN) units, following the closure of nearby RNAS Eglinton (HMS Gannet), which was subsequently referred to by the Royal Navy as RNAS Ballykelly.

In 1963, the runway was again extended and scramble platforms near the runway ends were added for potential V-Bomber dispersal. In 1964/65, a large hangar and workshops were completed to house Shackletons under cover. In January 1968, the RAF announced the base was to close and after a delay due to the late introduction of the Hawker Siddeley Nimrod to the RAF inventory, the last Shackleton left on 31 March 1971. The base was handed over to the British Army on 2 June 1971, when it re-opened as Shackleton Barracks. Since then the Army has improved facilities and accommodation and it is now a helicopter base.

== See also ==
- List of air stations of the Royal Navy
- List of former Royal Air Force stations
