= RAF Ballykelly =

Former Royal Air Force station in County Londonderry, Northern Ireland

RAF Ballykelly
- Near Ballykelly, County Londonderry in Northern Ireland
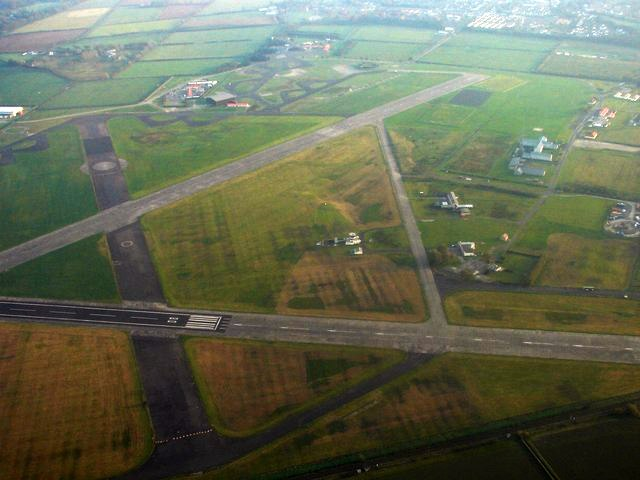

Site information
- Type: Royal Air Force station
- Owner: Ministry of Defence
- Operator: Royal Air Force; Royal Navy
- Controlled by: RAF Coastal Command * No. 15 (GR) Group RAF; Fleet Air Arm

Location
- Shown within Northern Ireland RAF Ballykelly (the United Kingdom)
- Coordinates: 55°03′16″N 07°01′12″W

Site history
- Built: 1940-41
- In use: June 1941-1971
- Battles/wars: European theatre of World War II; Cold War

Airfield information
- Identifiers: IATA: BOL, ICAO: EGQB
- Elevation: 3 metres (10 ft) AMSL
Runways
Direction	Length and surface
00/00	Concrete
00/00	Concrete
00/00	Concrete

Royal Air Force Ballykelly, or more simply RAF Ballykelly, is a former Royal Air Force station which opened in 1941 in Ballykelly, County Londonderry, Northern Ireland. It closed in 1971 when the site was handed over to the British Army as Shackleton Barracks. A small part of the base has been used as a refuelling point by army helicopters and small fixed-wing aircraft usually operating out of Joint Helicopter Command Flying Station Aldergrove near the town of Antrim.

== Second World War ==
RAF Ballykelly opened in June 1941 during the Second World War as an airfield for RAF Coastal Command. In 1943, the main runway was extended and acquired an unusual characteristic in that it crossed an active railway line. Rules were put in place giving trains the right of way over landing aircraft.

== Post-war ==
The airfield was closed at the end of the Second World War, but re-opened in 1947 as the home of the Joint Anti-Submarine School RAF, a training flight flying Avro Shackleton aircraft, which had formed at Londonderry on 19 September 1945.

In 1955, RAF Ballykelly was home to three squadrons of Shackletons, 204 Squadron, 240 Squadron and 269 Squadron. These were housed in T2 hangars in the dispersal areas and serviced in the huge Ballykelly Cantilever Hangar which was more than 700 feet wide and 130 feet deep. There was also a station flight with two Lockheed Hudsons, two Douglas Dakotas and an Auster. In 1957 and again in 1958, 240 Squadron was among those involved in Operation Grapple, nuclear weapon testing on Christmas Island in the Pacific Ocean.

By 1959, 240 and 269 Squadrons had been renumbered as 203 Squadron and 210 Squadron. The three Squadrons were part of the ASW (Anti-Submarine Warfare) force. They also covered search and rescue (SAR) standby duties together with their counterparts at RAF Kinloss and RAF St. Mawgan.

Some Royal Navy Fleet Air Arm units including 819 Squadron moved onto the station in 1962 and the navy referred to it as HMS Sealion or RNAS Ballykelly. The main runway (the one which crossed the railway) was extended again in 1963 to 7,500 feet to allow for potential dispersal of the RAF's V bomber force. This included the addition of V-bomber Operational Readiness Platforms at the eastern end. In April 1968, 204 Squadron flying from Ballykelly suffered the loss of an RAF Shackleton. Sqn Ldr Clive Haggett and his crew, a total of 12 men, were killed when their aircraft flew into the Mull of Kintyre early one rainy morning.

During a transatlantic yacht race in 1967/8 a French competitor was lost. One of the Shackletons from Ballykelly found him by adopting search positions well before the expected search location. They dropped life preserving equipment to him and marked his position to enable pick up by surface vessels.

The last of the Shackleton aircraft left RAF Ballykelly on 31 March 1971, the airfield closed and the site was handed over to the British Army as Shackleton Barracks on 2 June 1971.

The following units were here at some point:

- No. 53 Squadron RAF
- No. 59 Squadron RAF
- No. 86 Squadron RAF
- No. 120 Squadron RAF
- No. 153 Squadron RAF
- No. 210 Squadron RAF
- No. 248 Squadron RAF
- No. 269 Squadron RAF
- No. 281 Squadron RAF

Units

- No. 37 Squadron RAF Regiment
- No. 2707 Squadron RAF Regiment
- Air-Sea Warfare Development Unit RAF (March 1948 – May 1951 & September 1958 – April 1970)
- Coastal Command Development Unit RAF (December 1941)
- Satellite airfield of the Combined Anti-Submarine Tactical School RAF (1943)
- General Reconnaissance Pool RAF (September 1943 – August 1945)

Army Air Corps

- No. 651 Squadron AAC
- No. 652 Squadron AAC
- No. 655 Squadron AAC
- No. 657 Squadron AAC
- No. 658 Squadron AAC
- No. 659 Squadron AAC
- No. 660 Squadron AAC
- No. 661 Squadron AAC
- No. 665 Squadron AAC
- No. 666 Squadron AAC

Fleet Air Arm

- 744 Naval Air Squadron
- 745 Naval Air Squadron
- 772 Naval Air Squadron
- 811 Naval Air Squadron
- 814 Naval Air Squadron
- 815 Naval Air Squadron
- 831 Naval Air Squadron
- 833 Naval Air Squadron
- 834 Naval Air Squadron
- 835 Naval Air Squadron
- 836 Naval Air Squadron
- 837 Naval Air Squadron
- 849 Naval Air Squadron
- 849B Flight
- 892 Naval Air Squadron

== Incidents ==
On 29 March 2006, an Airbus A320 aircraft operated by Eirjet on behalf of Ryanair landed at Ballykelly after the pilot mistook the runway for that of nearby City of Derry Airport. The 39 passengers who boarded the flight at Liverpool John Lennon Airport continued their journey to the airport by bus.

== See also ==
- List of air stations of the Royal Navy
- List of former Royal Air Force stations
