= RAF St Davids =

Former Royal Air Force station in Pembrokeshire, Wales

RAF St Davids
- In the community of Solva; Near the city of St Davids, Pembrokeshire in Wales

Site information
- Type: Royal Air Force station
- Owner: Air Ministry
- Operator: Royal Air Force; Royal Navy
- Controlled by: RAF Coastal Command * No. 19 Group RAF; Fleet Air Arm
- Condition: Closed

Location
- Shown within Pembrokeshire RAF St Davids (the United Kingdom)
- Coordinates: 51°53′10″N 005°12′45″W

Site history
- Built: 1942-1943
- In use: 1943–1946 and 1974–1992 (Royal Air Force); 1946–1971 (Fleet Air Arm); 1961-1992; subsequent limited use
- Battles/wars: European theatre of World War II; Cold War

Garrison information
- Occupants: 1944; Officers - 204 (10 WAAF); Other Ranks - 2,561 (475 WAAF)

Airfield information
- Elevation: 76 metres (249 ft) AMSL
Runways
Direction	Length and surface
04/22	975 metres (3,199 ft) Concrete and wood chips
08/26	1,801 metres (5,909 ft) Concrete and wood chips
13/31	1,088 metres (3,570 ft) Concrete and wood chips

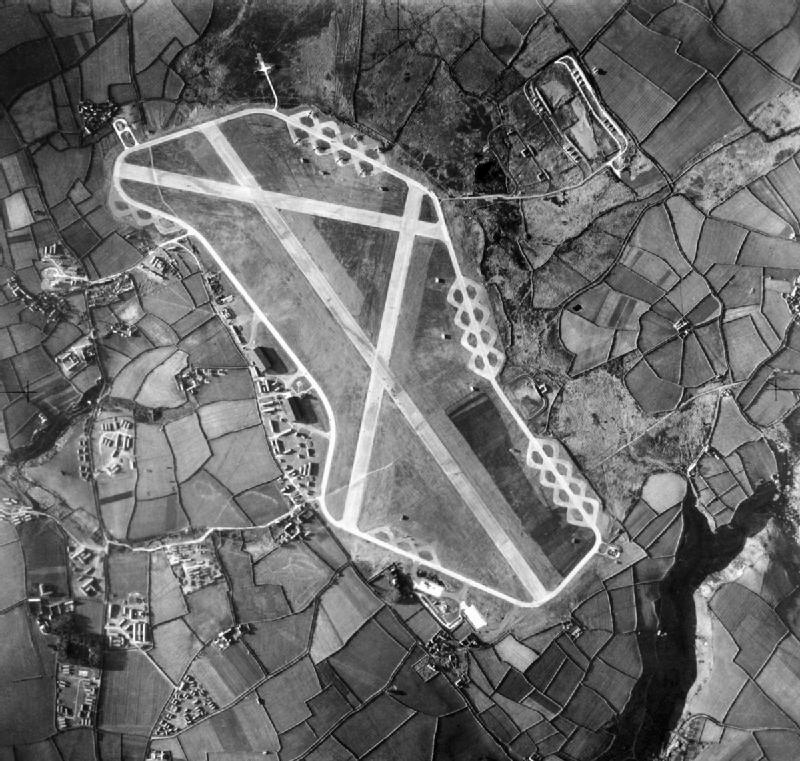
Aerial view of RAF St. David's, after its completion and shortly before its occupation by Nos. 58 and 502 Squadrons RAF, as a base for anti-submarine patrols.

Royal Air Force St Davids, or more simply RAF St Davids, is a former Royal Air Force station, near the city of St Davids, Pembrokeshire, Wales, in the community of Solva.

It opened in the late summer of 1943, for RAF Coastal Command. The station was put into a care and maintenance status in November 1945. However, the Royal Navy took over control from 1950 until 1961. The airfield was then used as a Relief Landing Ground, for No. 1 Tactical Weapons Unit's advanced jet trainers, while they operated from RAF Brawdy, between 1974 and 1992.

== History ==
In September 1941 approval for land acquisition, for the construction of an airfield for use as a satellite for RAF Haverfordwest, was given for an area of fields, with the River Solva and the village of Middle Mill to its east, and east of the city of St Davids, on the northern headland of St Brides Bay.

=== Station design ===
The airfield was constructed with five clusters of thirty diamond-shaped hard-standings, around the perimeter. It had three runways, constructed in a triangular pattern, with lengths of 1801 m (5910 ft); 975 m (3200 ft); and 1088 m (3570 ft). Three T type hangars were erected on the southern perimeter, along with three Blister hangars. The southern area of the airfield also housed a watch office, to pattern 12779/41, the living quarters, and various Nissen huts or Maycrete huts (prefabricated structures of reinforced concrete posts supporting a pitched roof frame with an infilling of sawdust concrete panels) for maintenance purposes. The bomb store was situated along the northern perimeter, as was the fuel store. The bomb dump was further to the north.

=== RAF Coastal Command ===
In September 1942, during construction of the airfield it was transferred to RAF Coastal Command. It was designated as a satellite for RAF Haverfordwest, but it was originally intended to operate Consolidated B-24 Liberator aircraft, the PB4Y-1 variant, a navalised B-24D, for the U.S. Navy for maritime patrol. In September 1943, it started to be used by RAF Coastal Command units and the first to arrive were detachments from No. 206 and No. 220 Sqns. In November 1943, No. 517 Meteorological Squadron arrived with a couple of Handley Page Halifax aircraft; but these moved to the newly opened RAF Brawdy in February 1944. In December 1943, No. 58 and No. 502 Sqns arrived to undertake anti-submarine patrols, but both squadrons departed for RAF Stornoway in September 1944.

From October 1944, the airfield was used for non-operational duties. Handley Page Halifax, Consolidated B-24 Liberator and Vickers Wellington aircraft were readied for immediate RAF Coastal Command use by The General Reconnaissance Aircraft Preparation Pool. In June 1945, No. 220 Sqn returned to RAF St Davids, along with No. 53 Sqn; but three months later, during September, both squadrons departed.

The station's headquarters, sick bay and workshops facilities, moved to RAF Brawdy in November 1945. RAF St Davids was then reduced to care and maintenance status.

=== Royal Navy ===
On 1 January 1946, the airfield was handed over to the Fleet Air Arm, part of the Royal Navy. The station was used from September 1951 until October 1958 by Airwork Services Ltd, who ran a civilian-operated unit of the Fleet Air Arm, the Airwork Air Direction Training Unit (ADTU). The unit moved from RNAS Brawdy in 1951, returning there in 1958, however, it continued to use RAF St Davids as a satellite airfield.

A detachment from 787 Naval Air Fighting Development Unit operated here from April to July 1952, testing aircraft capabilities and developing tactics.

The airfield was returned to the Royal Air Force in April 1974.

=== RAF Tactical Weapons Unit ===
The RAF Tactical Weapons Unit used one runway from 1974 to 1992 as a very basic relief landing ground.

=== Project POTEEN ===
During the 1990s there was a plan to locate a US Navy Relocatable Over The Horizon Radar, the AN/TPS-71 (ROTHR), in the United Kingdom. This was to provide cover to the North over the Norwegian Sea to detect Soviet ships and aircraft transiting from their bases in the Murmansk Oblast into the North Atlantic. In 1990, a Memorandum of Understanding (MoU) was signed between the British and US Governments to install the radar, initially for a two-year trial commencing in 1993.

RAF St Davids was selected as the location for the transmitter station, with RAF Blakehill Farm in Wiltshire to be the receiver station. A series of trials were carried out, although it is not clear what work was undertaken at RAF St Davids itself. However, the dissolution of the Soviet Union in Dec 1991 saw the US Navy curtail the ROTHR programme with a prototype operating in Amchitka, Alaska; and no construction work was ever started at RAF St Davids.

== Royal Air Force Operational History ==
=== Meteorological Unit ===
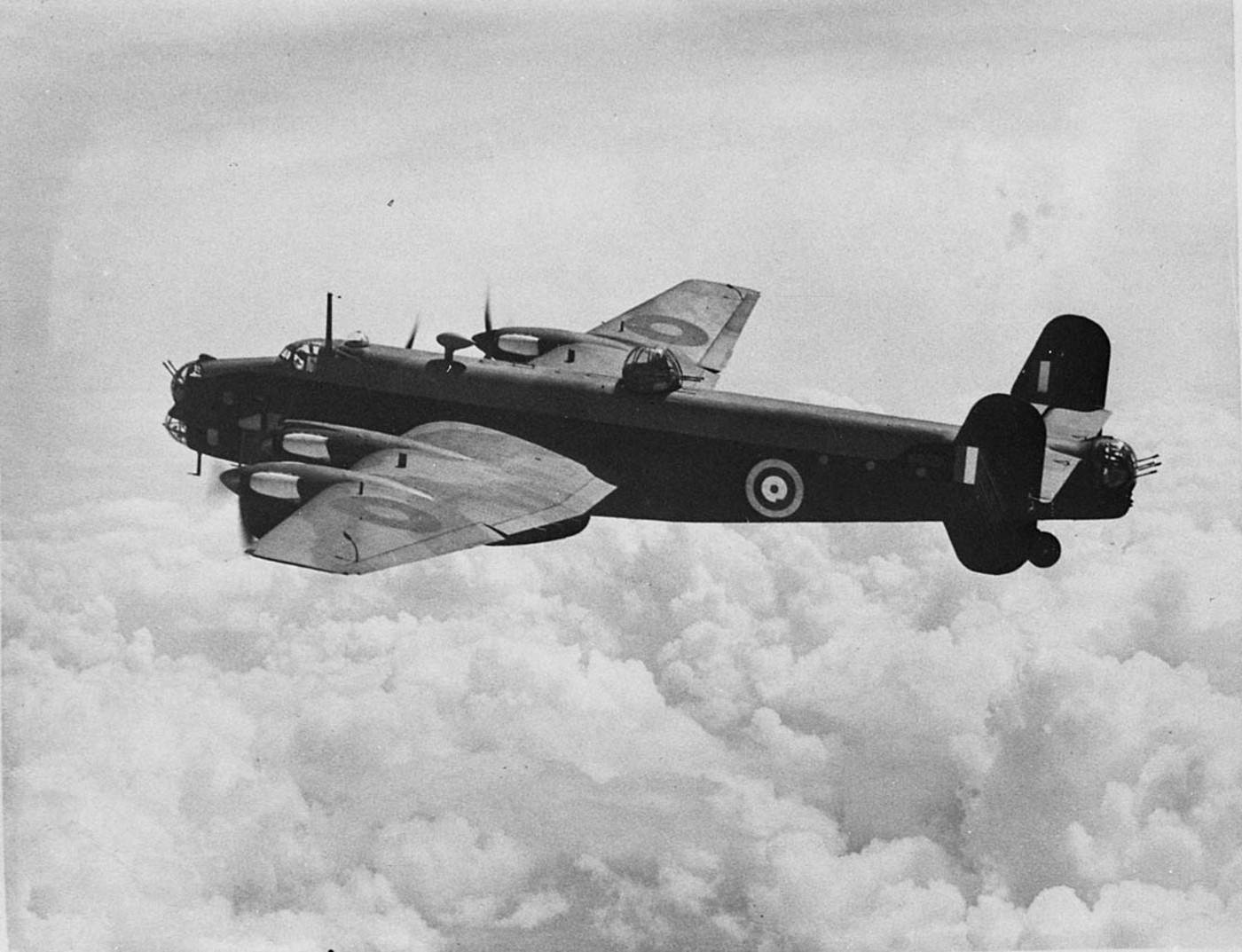
Handley Page Halifax, an example of the aircraft used by No. 517 Sqn

No. 517 Squadron RAF, a meteorological squadron, arrived on 26 November 1943, with a couple of Handley Page Halifax a British four-engined heavy bomber, from RAF St Eval. The unit undertook meteorological flights over the Western Approaches, while also performing anti-submarine patrol duties. It also had Handley Page Hampden, a British twin-engine medium bomber and Boeing Fortress I, an American four-engined heavy bomber. However, the squadron moved to the newly opened RAF Brawdy on 1 February 1944. United States Army Air Forces (USAAF) aircraft attached.

=== Anti-submarine patrols ===
In December 1943, No. 58 and No. 502 Squadron RAF arrived from RAF Holmsley South, to undertake anti-submarine patrols. Both squadrons were equipped with Handley Page Halifax II aircraft. But both squadrons departed for RAF Stornoway in September 1944.

=== General Reconnaissance Aircraft Preparation Pool ===
The General Reconnaissance Aircraft Preparation Pool readied Handley Page Halifax, Consolidated Liberator and Vickers Wellington, a British twin-engined, long-range medium bomber, for immediate RAF Coastal Command use, from October 1944.

=== RAF Transport Command ===
No. 220 Squadron RAF, returned to RAF St Davids, from RAF Lagens, along with No. 53 Squadron RAF from RAF Reykjavik, on the 1 June 1945, both as part of RAF Transport Command and both squadrons operated Consolidated Liberator VI and VIII aircraft. Three months later, during September, both squadrons departed, with No. 53 Sqn moving to RAF Merryfield on the 17 September, and No. 220 Sqn relocating to RAF Waterbeach on the 22 September.

=== Other Units ===
Detachments from No. 206 Squadron RAF and No. 220 Squadron RAF were the first units to arrive and use RAF St Davids, operating Boeing Fortress aircraft.

==== RAF Regiment ====
No. 2710 Squadron RAF Regiment moved from RAF Haverfordwest, on the 4 November 1944, however, it left RAF St Davids for Gatwick, on the 16 February 1945. No. 2954 Squadron RAF Regiment, was an Anti-Aircraft Squadron, part of No. 19 Group and was stationed at RAF St Davids during its existence.

== Royal Navy Operational History ==
=== Air Direction Training Unit (ADTU) ===
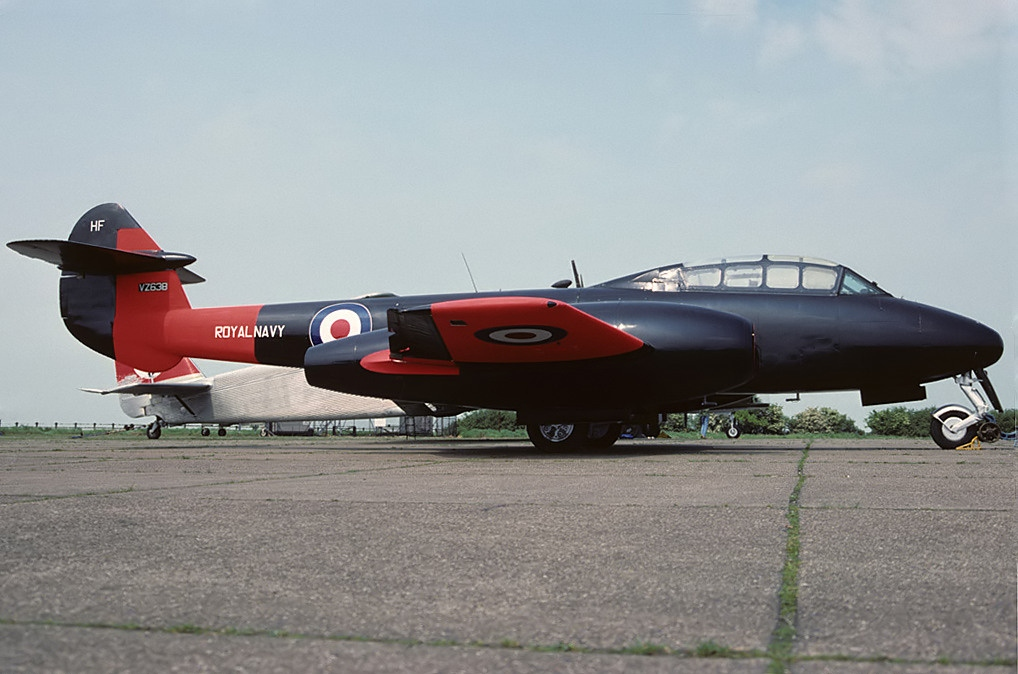
Gloster Meteor T.7, an example of the type used by ADTU at St Davids

The Airwork Air Direction Training Unit (ADTU) provided a jet conversion course, using Gloster Meteor T.7, a British jet fighter aircraft. However, the unit's main purpose here, was to provide aircraft and aircrew, flying live interception flights from RAF St Davids, for the Royal Navy School of Aircraft Direction, from September 1951. This was located in a new, purpose built, Fighter Direction School, called the R.N. Aircraft Direction Centre. It was known as RNADC Kete (HMS Harrier) and was located on the coast, 1 mile (2 km) south of RNAS Dale (HMS Goldcrest), and 0.25 miles (0 km) north of St. Ann's Head, Pembrokeshire.

The unit initially flew de Havilland Mosquito T.3, a British twin-engined, multirole combat aircraft and de Havilland Sea Mosquito TR.33, a navalised Mosquito for Royal Navy use as a torpedo bomber, along with Taylorcraft Auster 5, a British military liaison and observation aircraft, these were later supplemented with de Havilland Sea Hornet F.20 and NF.21, a British twin-engined fighter aircraft, Gloster Meteor T.7, de Havilland Sea Venom FAW.20 and FAW.21, the navalised version of the de Havilland Venom NF.2 two-seat night fighter, and Supermarine Attacker F.1 and FB.2, a British single-seat naval jet fighter aircraft. ADTU returned from RNAS Brawdy in October 1958.

=== Naval Air Fighting Development Unit ===
A detachment from 787 Naval Air Squadron, which was the Naval Air Fighting Development Unit, operated here as a trials unit developing capabilities and tactics, arriving on the 22 April 1952. The unit operated Hawker Sea Fury FB.11, a British fighter aircraft, and de Havilland Vampire FB.5, a British jet fighter. It departed RAF St Davids on 24 July 1952.

== Current use ==
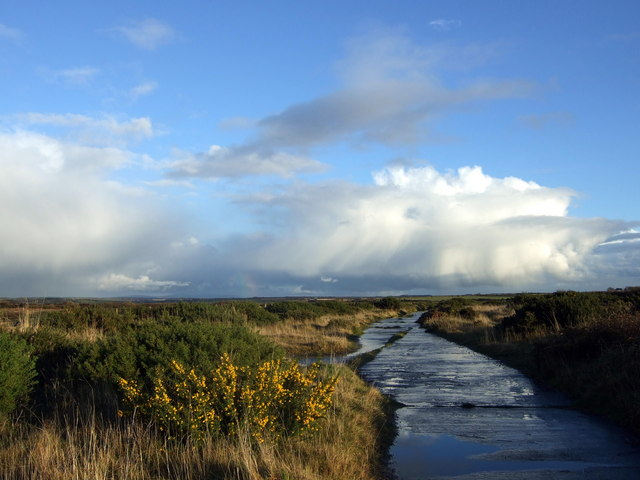
Old service road, St David's airfield. This service road linked the main airfield to the bomb depot beyond the northern perimeter.

Parts of the airfield were finally sold off by the government in the mid-nineties. St. Davids is now owned by the Pembrokeshire Coast National Park Authority.

The area was the subject of an archaeological survey in 2000 and was a venue for the National Eisteddfod of Wales (2002).

== See also ==
- List of former Royal Air Force stations
- List of air stations of the Royal Navy
- RAF Brawdy, satellite station that eventually became the parent
- RNADC Kete (HMS Harrier) Royal Navy Fighter Direction School
