= RAF Talbenny =

Former Royal Air Force station in Pembrokeshire, Wales

RAF Talbenny
- Talbenny Aerodrome
- Talbenny, Pembrokeshire in Wales

Site information
- Type: Royal Air Force station
- Owner: Air Ministry
- Operator: Royal Air Force
- Controlled by: RAF Coastal Command 1942-1943 * No. 19 Group RAF; RAF Transport Command 1943-1946 * No. 44 Group RAF; RAF Fighter Command 1946
- Condition: Disused

Location
- Shown within Pembrokeshire RAF Talbenny (the United Kingdom)
- Coordinates: 51°45′23″N 005°08′30″W

Site history
- Built: 1941-1942
- In use: 1942-1946 (Royal Air Force)
- Fate: Farmland / Industry / Leisure
- Battles/wars: European theatre of World War II

Garrison information
- Occupants: 1944; Officers - 153 (8 WAAF); Other Ranks - 2,619 (308 WAAF)

Airfield information
- Elevation: 70 metres (230 ft) AMSL
Runways
Direction	Length and surface
03/21	1,463 metres (4,800 ft) Concrete and Asphalt concrete
35/17	1,006 metres (3,301 ft) Concrete and Asphalt concrete
27/09	914 metres (2,999 ft) Concrete and Asphalt concrete

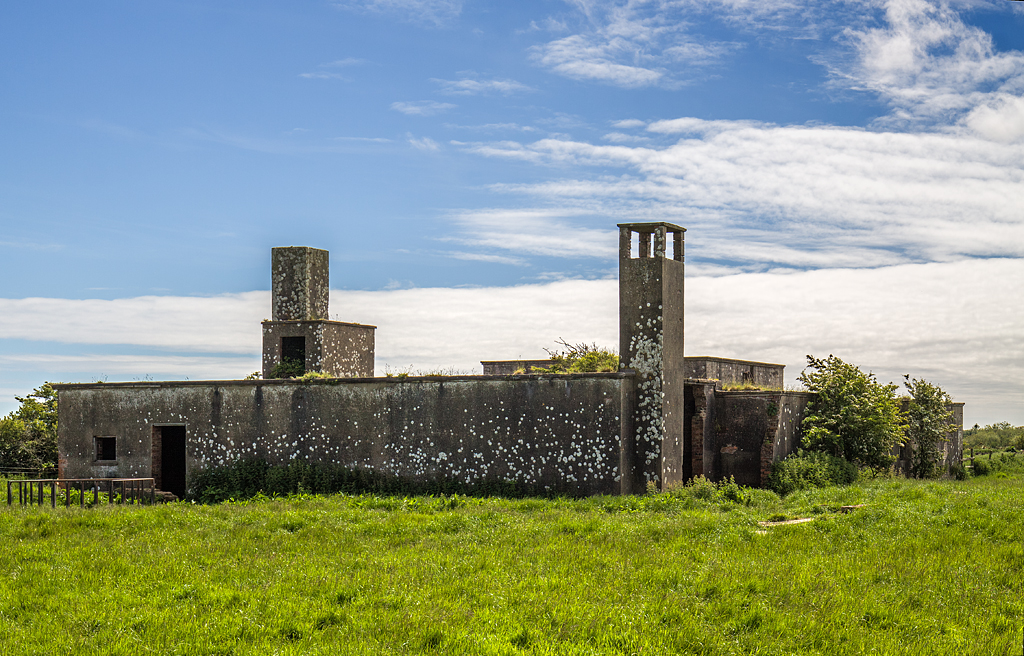
The remains of RAF Talbenny's Operations Block

Royal Air Force Talbenny, or more simply RAF Talbenny, is a former Royal Air Force station located 5.6 miles (9 km) north west of Milford Haven, Pembrokeshire and 7.9 miles (12.7 km) south west of Haverfordwest, Pembrokeshire, Wales.

Situated around 3 miles (5 km) from RAF Dale, its satellite airfield, on an escarpment overlooking St Brides Bay, it was operational from 1 May 1942, to 15 December 1946, having been under Coastal Command, Transport Command and Fighter Command of the Royal Air Force.

RAF Talbenny opened as a No. 19 Group RAF, RAF Coastal Command station, and was immediately put to use as an operational air base for squadrons undertaking anti-submarine maritime patrols, focusing around the Bay of Biscay.

== History ==
In March 1941 approval for land acquisition, for the construction of an airfield for RAF Coastal Command to use as a coastal Operational Training Unit, was given for an area of fields to the west of the village of Talbenny.

There was a requirement identified for a longer runway sometime later, however, due to the need to divert a road to achieve this, a decision was made not to pursue it.

=== Station design ===
Talbenny airfield was built with thirty six 'frying-pan' hardstandings, enabling parking for two squadrons. The airfield had three runways, constructed with a central intersection, measuring: 1463 m (4800 ft) long, 1006 m (3300 ft) long, and 914 m (3000 ft) long. Additional facilities included two T2 hangars, one in the south-east corner and the other in north east-corner, along with a Technical site. The concrete aprons were constructed sometime after the airfield opened.

=== RAF Coastal Command (1942-1943) ===
Shortly after RAF Talbenny opened, No. 311 Squadron, a Czech bomber squadron, arrived in June 1942. Operating with Vickers Wellington IC aircraft, it remained for around a year and saw action undertaking anti-submarine duties and shipping strikes, along the Western Approaches and in the Bay of Biscay, along with 304 Squadron (Polish) from RAF Dale, which supported the anti-submarine patrols in the Bay of Biscay.

In July 1942, No. 311 Squadron damaged two U-boats with Squadron Leader J. Stransky, flying Vickers Wellington DC664 'A', attacking German submarine U-106 in particular. However, in August, Pilot Officer Nyvlt, in Vickers Wellington HF922 'H', attacked and claimed German submarine U-578. During air encounters a Kriegsmarine (German Navy) Arado Ar 196 floatplane was shot down, unfortunately No. 311 Squadron lost an aircraft, during July. The Czech Deputy Prime Minister, the Czech Foreign Minister, Jan Masaryk and the Minister of National Defence, Sergěj Ingr, of the exiled Czech government visited RAF Talbenny in August 1942, to commemorate the second anniversary of No. 311 Sqn as an RAF Squadron. During August No. 311 Squadron RAF flew 104 sorties with seven U-boat attacks. In September, 101 sorties were completed with three U-boat encounters. The Commander-in-chief of RAF Coastal Command, Air Chief Marshal Sir Philip Joubert de la Ferté, congratulated both No. 311 Squadron and No. 304 Polish Bomber Squadron on their start to operating life within RAF Coastal Command.

During the latter part of 1942 bad weather hindered the anti-submarine patrols, and during October both squadrons reported only a single attack, but the lack of encounters could also be attributed to many U-boats being moved towards north Africa following Operation Torch and the Allied invasion of French North Africa. There were no further U-boat sightings during November and December 1942.

During the end of 1942 and the beginning of 1943, a Bristol Beaufighter VIC aircraft detachment, from No. 248 Squadron arrived at RAF Talbenny provided fighter cover for the Vickers Wellington aircraft of No. 311 Squadron and No. 304 Polish Bomber Squadron. They were supported by No. 235 Squadron, also operating with Bristol Beaufighter VIC aircraft, and probably operating from RAF St Eval. However it is disputed by both C.G. Jefford – RAF Squadrons. A comprehensive record of the movement and equipment of all RAF squadrons and their antecedents since 1912 – published in 1988 by Airlife and by the squadrons Operational Record Book at the UK National Archives that a detachment from 235 Squadron was here. During their time on these escort sorties three Luftwaffe Junkers Ju 88 aircraft were shot down, however two Bristol Beaufighter aircraft were lost to Luftwaffe Focke-Wulf Fw 190 fighter aircraft, in December 1942.

With its secondary diversionary role, notable landings included a BOAC Liberator aircraft, registration ‘'G-AGFO'’, a Boeing B-17 Flying Fortress from a USAAF weather reconnaissance unit, which had conducted a meteorological flight, and a USAAF B-24 Liberator, during January 1943.

In 1943 there were very few anti-submarine encounters. No. 311 Squadron and No 304 Polish Bomber Squadron combined to attack the harbour at Bordeaux on 26 January 1943 but by Spring, effectively, the battle against the U-boats had been won. No. 303 Ferry Training Unit RAF moved in to RAF Talbenny in March, relocating from RAF Stornoway. Its main function was to prepare aircraft for overseas ferrying. Then, No. 311 Sqn transferred to RAF Bomber Command, and left for RAF Beaulieu during May 1943, the shipping attacks having finished. The RAF approached the Admiralty and looked to swap Talbenny airfield with RNAS St Merryn (HMS Vulture), in June 1943. The request was refused and the RAF therefore investigated a new role for RAF Talbenny.

=== RAF Transport Command (1943-1946) ===
On 16 October 1943 the airfield was transferred to RAF Transport Command, under No. 44 Group RAF. No. 16 Flight was the first unit to arrive and it was used for the transportation of VIPs. The flight operated at RAF Talbenny with a variety of different aircraft types, including three Avro Anson, a multi-role aircraft, three Airspeed Oxford, a training aircraft, three Vickers Warwick, a British twin-engined multi-purpose aircraft, three Handley Page Halifax, a British four-engined heavy bomber and two C-47 Dakota, a military transport aircraft. As well as VIP, cargo was carried around the UK and parts of Europe when required.

One RAF Coastal Command unit remained at RAF Talbenny. No. 4 Armament Practice Camp RAF was based at Talbenny from December 1942, relocating from RAF Carew Cheriton, providing instruction for anti-submarine warfare, as well as both air-to-ground and air-to-air combat. It used Miles Master and Miles Martinet aircraft alongside Westland Lysander and Fairey Battle aircraft, and due to it being an RAF Coastal Command unit, it was classed as a lodger unit at RAF Talbenny.

No. 303 Ferry Training Unit ferried aircrew and aircraft overseas for operational deployment. Initially, for the first month, the unit moved forty aircraft, but by mid 1944, this averaged around ninety aircraft per month and notably 101 Vickers Wellington went through in March 1944. No. 3 Overseas Aircraft Despatch Unit RAF relocated to RAF Talbenny from RAF Hurn in July 1944, and then No. 303 Ferry Training Unit disbanded in September 1944, reforming as No. 11 Ferry Unit RAF. In August 1945, 11 Ferry Unit was transferred to RAF Dunkeswell and not long afterwards No 4 Armament Practice Camp RAF disbanded and RAF Talbenny was placed into care and maintenance. It was still an emergency airfield for transatlantic flights, therefore a skeleton staff remained.

== Royal Air Force operational history ==
=== Anti-ship and anti-submarine warfare ===
RAF Talbenny opened on the 1 May 1942 for No. 19 Group RAF of RAF Coastal Command and was operational straight away for anti-submarine patrols as far as the Bay of Biscay. The patrols were generally profitless and extensive, with the crews looking out for both U-boats and long range Luftwaffe patrols.

No. 311 (Czech) Squadron and No. 304 Polish Bomber Squadron arrived (the latter based out of the satellite airfield at RAF Dale), transferred from RAF Bomber Command, in early June. However, before they could operate on any anti-submarine patrols, seven aircrew from No. 304 Polish Bomber Squadron and eleven aircrew from No. 311 (Czech) Squadron took part in the third "1,000 bomber" raid, which was part of the bombing of Bremen, on 25 June.

==== 311 Squadron ====
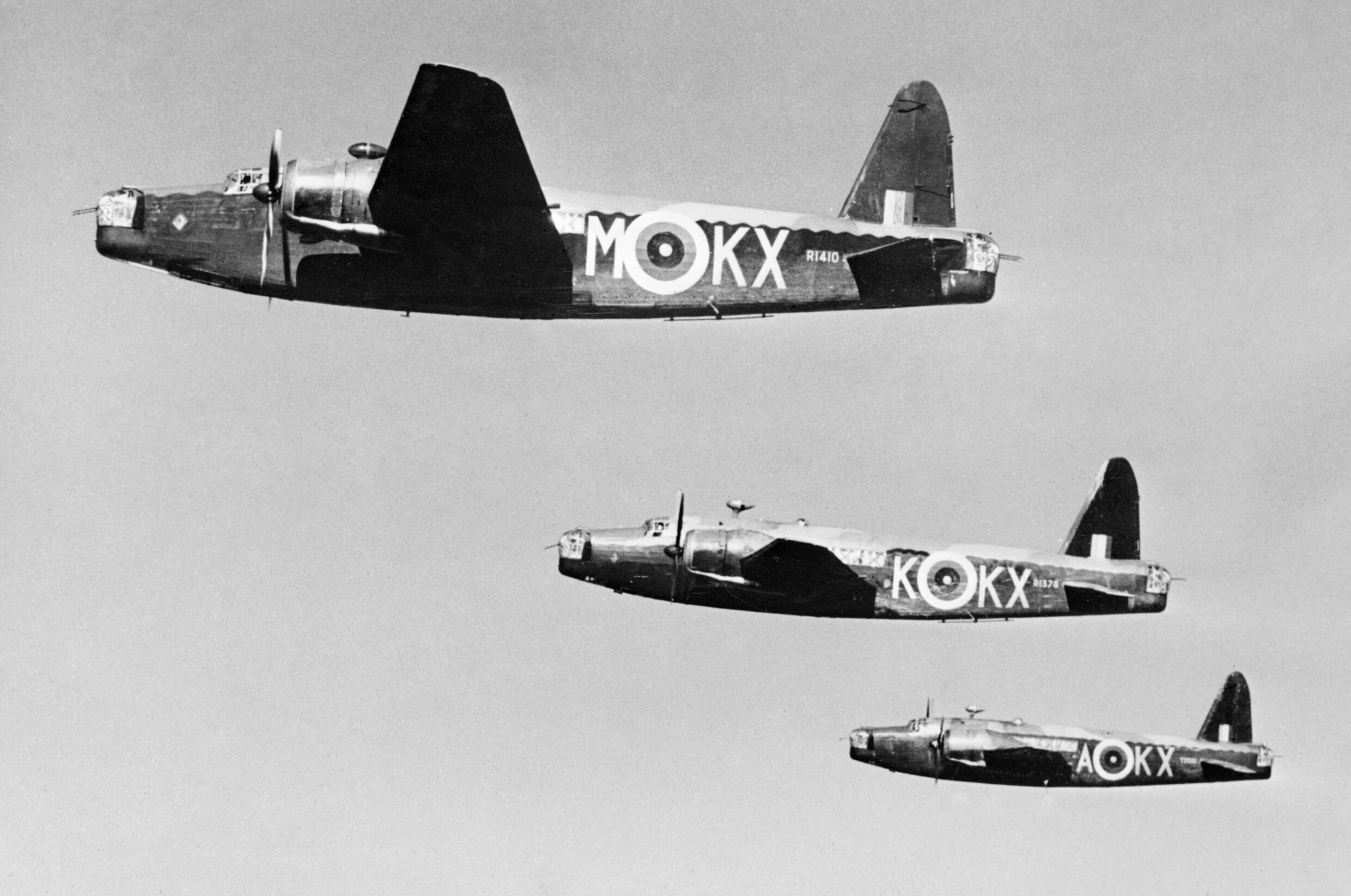
Three Wellington Mk ICs of No. 311 (Czechoslovak) Squadron RAF, March 1941

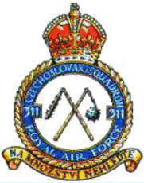
RAF311Sq

No. 311 Squadron RAF, a Czechoslovak-manned bomber squadron, arrived from RAF Aldergrove on 12 June 1942. The squadron was equipped with Vickers Wellington IC aircraft, a British twin-engined, long-range medium bomber. It flew operations over the Bay of Biscay and the Western Approaches, tasked with anti-submarine patrols and shipping attacks. The squadron's aircraft were in RAF Bomber Command's camouflage scheme, which was unsuitable for maritime patrols, and weren't repainted in RAF Coastal Command's Temperate Sea Scheme (dark slate grey and extra dark sea grey above, and white below), until September 1942.

One notable attack saw a raid on La Pallice, the deep water port of La Rochelle, in occupied France, on 25 August 1942 and this was followed up by a successful anti-shipping operation in the Gironde estuary in the November. No. 311 Sqn achieved the highest success rate in RAF Coastal Command between June 1942 and April 1943, while based at RAF Talbenny, in spite of their Vickers Wellington aircraft variant not being equipped with any form of air-to-surface-vessel (ASV) radar, although in April 1943 it was partly re-equipped with five Wellington Mark X aircraft. The squadron departed for RAF Beaulieu, located in the New Forest, Hampshire, on 26 May 1943.

==== 248 Squadron ====
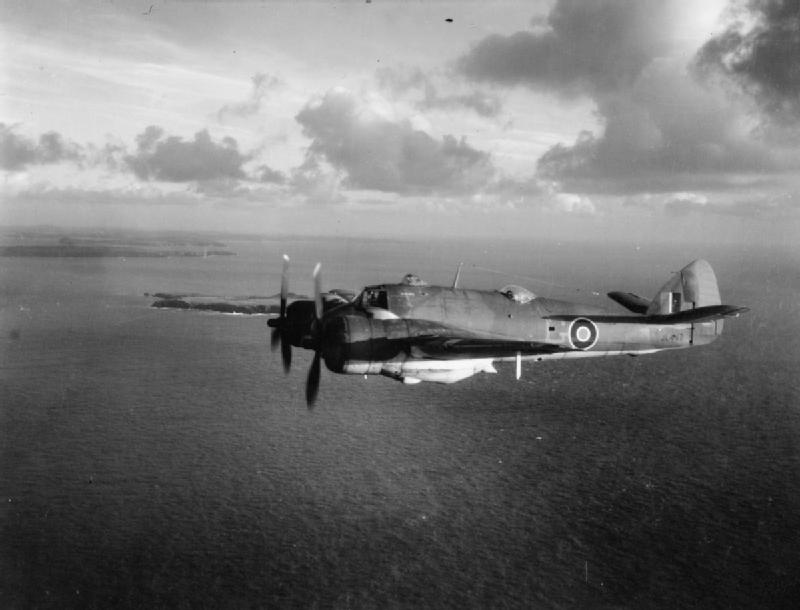
No. 248 Squadron RAF, Bristol Beaufighter Mk.VIC, JL447 'G'

No. 248 Squadron RAF was tasked with carrying out fighter cover and escort duties over the Western Approaches and the Bay of Biscay, operating as part of No. 19 Group RAF from RAF Talbenny, from 13 September to 3 November 1942 and then from 5 December 1942 to 18 January 1943. Assigned the squadron code WR, it was equipped with Bristol Beaufighter Mk.VIC aircraft, and along with another Beaufighter squadron, No. 235, 248 was directed to oppose the Luftwaffe Junkers Ju 88 aircraft that were attacking the Vickers Wellington anti-submarine aircraft of No. 311 and No. 304 Sqns, over the Bay of Biscay.

==== 304 Polish Squadron ====
304th Polish Bomber Squadron

No. 304 Polish Bomber Squadron, known as No. 304 (Land of Silesia) Polish Bomber Squadron, was a Polish World War II bomber unit, which fought alongside the Royal Air Force. The squadron was equipped with Vickers Wellington IC aircraft.

Based out of the satellite airfield of RAF Dale, it worked alongside No. 311 Squadron RAF in the anti-shipping and anti-submarine warfare roles. It operated out of RAF Talbenny between 3 and 30 December 1942, while work took place on the runways at the squadron's home airfield.

=== Ferry Flight Operations ===
When No. 3 Overseas Aircraft Despatch Unit RAF arrived an RAF Talbenny in July 1944 its role was to fetch aircraft from other Aircraft Preparation Units and return to RAF Talbenny for No. 303 Ferry Training Unit RAF, enabling the latter unit to have the aircraft available at the air base for departure. No. 303 Ferry Training Unit RAF became No. 11 Ferry Unit RAF with the unit's role hardly altering and No. 3 Overseas Aircraft Despatch Unit RAF merged into the new Ferry Unit.

==== 303 Ferry Training Unit ====
No. 303 Ferry Training Unit RAF (No 303 FTU) arrived on 5 March 1943. It was equipped with Vickers Wellington aircraft. The unit's primary role was aircraft preparation and aircrew training for overseas deployment flights. Later, Vickers Warwick and Lockheed Ventura aircraft were introduced. On 8 September 1944 the unit disbanded, forming No. 11 Ferry Unit RAF at Talbenny. No. 303 FTU briefly operated out of RAF Dale, while a Drem Lighting System, to aid a visual approach, was being installed at RAF Talbenny.

==== 11 Ferry Unit ====
No. 11 Ferry Unit RAF operated out of RAF Talbenny from the 8 September, as a redesignated 3 FTU, until it moved to RAF Dunkeswell in East Devon, England, in August 1945. It operated with a number of different aircraft types and variants:

- Airspeed Oxford I and II twin-engine monoplane training aircraft
- Westland Lysander IIIA army co-operation and liaison aircraft
- Supermarine Spitfire IIa, Vb and IX single-seat fighter aircraft
- Vickers Wellington X, XIII and XIV twin-engined, long-range medium bomber
- Vickers Warwick I, III and V twin-engined maritime reconnaissance, air-sea rescue, and transport aircraft
- Avro Anson I and VII twin-engine, multi-role aircraft
- Lockheed Ventura I and V twin-engine medium bomber and patrol bomber
- Handley Page Halifax III four-engined heavy bomber

==== 3 Overseas Aircraft Despatch Unit ====
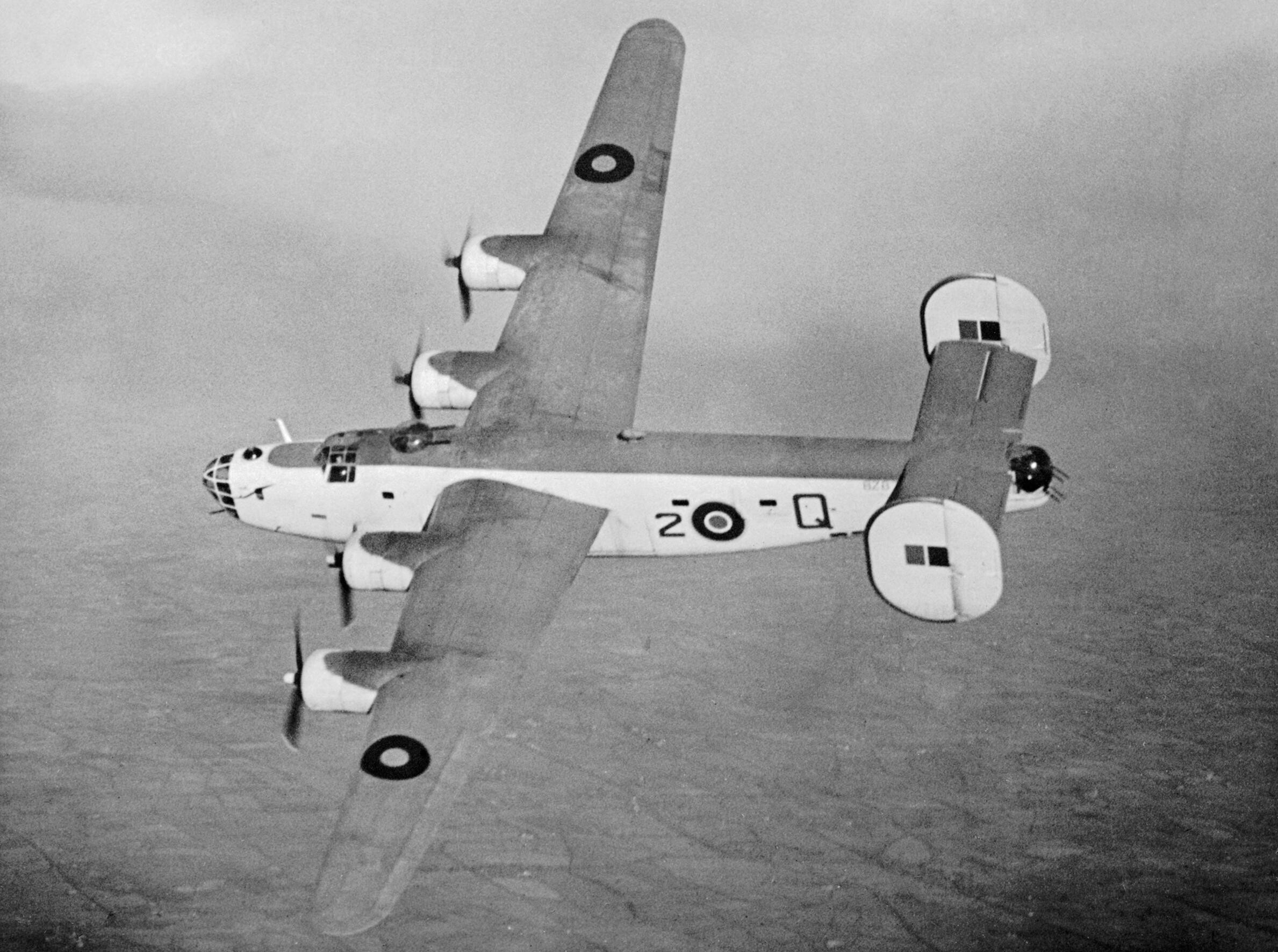
Liberator GR Mark V, 'BZ877 2-Q', of No. 86 Squadron RAF, an example of the type No 3 OADU moved

No. 3 Overseas Aircraft Despatch Unit RAF arrived from Dorset, England, relocating from RAF Hurn on 26 July 1944. The units role was to co-ordinate the ferry flights of military aircraft to their next air base. It operated with the following aircraft and variants:

- Armstrong Whitworth Albemarle I twin-engine transport aircraft
- Consolidated B-24 Liberator V four-engined heavy bomber
- Handley Page Halifax II four-engined heavy bomber
- Vickers Wellington IA, II, III, VIII, X, XI, XI, XII, XIII & XIV twin-engined, long-range medium bomber
- Vickers Warwick I twin-engined maritime reconnaissance, air-sea rescue, and transport aircraft
- de Havilland Tiger Moth II biplane primary trainer aircraft

The unit ceased to operate on 9 November 1944 at RAF Talbenny and administratively disbanded on 17 May 1945.

=== Armament Practice Camp ===
Training in aircraft ordnance for the Lockheed Hudson and Handley Page Halifax squadrons within RAF Coastal Command was provided by the Armament Practice Camp, and practice was also given to the United States Navy's Navy Patrol Bomber Squadron VPB-103, Fleet Air Wing 7, which continued aerial anti-submarine warfare based at RAF Dunkeswell, their AAF aircraft being redesignated under the USN/USMC system of the time as PB4Y-1 Liberator.

==== No. 4 Armament Practice Camp ====
No. 4 Armament Practice Camp RAF was based at Talbenny from December 1942, relocating from RAF Carew Cheriton, until the airfield was placed into care and maintenance, with the unit disbanding on 1 September 1945. It was part of No. 19 Group RAF, and provided instruction in Air-to-air combat, air-to-surface firing and anti-submarine attacks. It operated:

- Westland Lysander Mk.IIIA army co-operation and liaison aircraft
- Fairey Battle single-engine light bomber
- Miles Master II two-seat monoplane advanced trainer aircraft
- Miles Martinet TT.Mk I target tug aircraft

=== Other Units ===
==== Coastal Command Development Unit ====
In April 1943 the Coastal Command Development Unit RAF (CCDU) relocated from RAF Tain, but was then based out of RAF Talbenny's satellite station, RAF Dale. The units initial purpose was to undertake service trials of all radar equipment such as air-to-surface-vessel (ASV) radar to assist RAF Coastal Command operations. It was required to investigate the tactics for the use of all types of radar equipment in RAF Coastal Command aircraft, but its role changed to cover both service and tactical trials of all RAF Coastal Command aircraft and equipment, including trials of anti-submarine warfare equipment and techniques.

==== Dale Airfield ====
RAF Talbenny had a satellite airfield, RAF Dale, which was used as a relief landing ground. The Coastal Command Development Unit RAF, was based there from April to September 1943, and it was briefly used by No. 303 Ferry Training Unit RAF, while a Drem Lighting System, to aid a visual approach, was being installed at Talbenny.

== Incidents ==
RAF Talbenny was also an emergency and diversion airfield. Eight Consolidated B-24 Liberator aircraft of the 44th Bombardment Group (Heavy) of the Eighth Air Force attempted to land at Talbenny on 3 January 1943. Returning from an attack on the Saint-Nazaire submarine base, the aircraft were low on fuel and unable to reach their air base in East Anglia. Five aircraft made successful landings. The other three aircraft; one overshot the runway and two crashed having run out of fuel. Five airmen were killed in the incident.

== Previous units ==
The following squadrons were here at some point:

- No. 248 Squadron RAF with Bristol Beaufighter VIC
- No. 304 Polish Bomber Squadron with Vickers Wellington IC
- No. 311 Squadron RAF with Vickers Wellington IC

Units

- No. 3 Overseas Aircraft Despatch Unit
- No. 4 Armament Practice Camp RAF
- No. 11 Ferry Unit RAF
- No. 303 Ferry Training Unit RAF
- Coastal Command Development Unit RAF

== Royal Air Force Station commanders ==
Note: The ranks shown are the ranks held at the time of holding the appointment of commanding officer, Royal Air Force Talbenny.

RAF Talbenny commanders
rank	name	from
Group captain	J C A Johnson	7 Oct 1944

== Closure ==
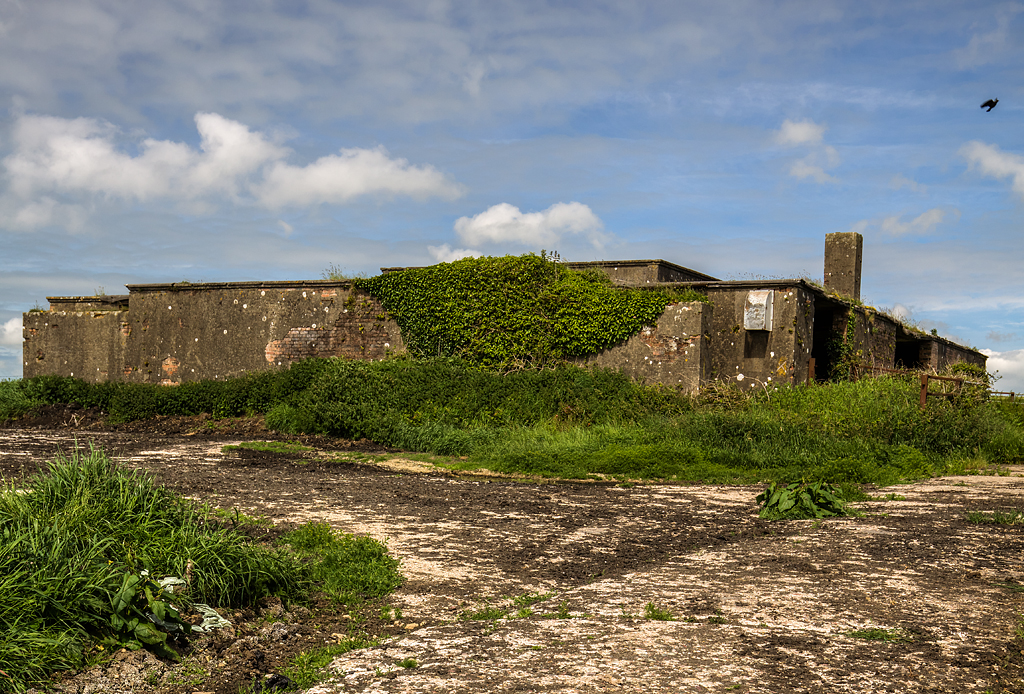
The remains of RAF Talbenny's operations block

The airfield was transferred to RAF Fighter Command in March 1946, however with the end of World War II, the run down of many military airfields, and with RAF Talbenny already placed in a care and maintenance status, the airfield was finally closed, in December 1946.

== Post RAF and current use ==
The airfield continued to be used for other purposes. The Ministry of Agriculture used the accommodation buildings and other facilities to house volunteer harvest labourers, working on the local farms, during the 1950s.

Motorsport used Talbenny for rallying. Pembrokeshire Motor Club ran sprint events at Talbenny Airfield in the 1950s through to the early 1980s. In the late 1970s a Rallycross course was developed at Talbenny, hosting rounds of the British Rallycross Championship.

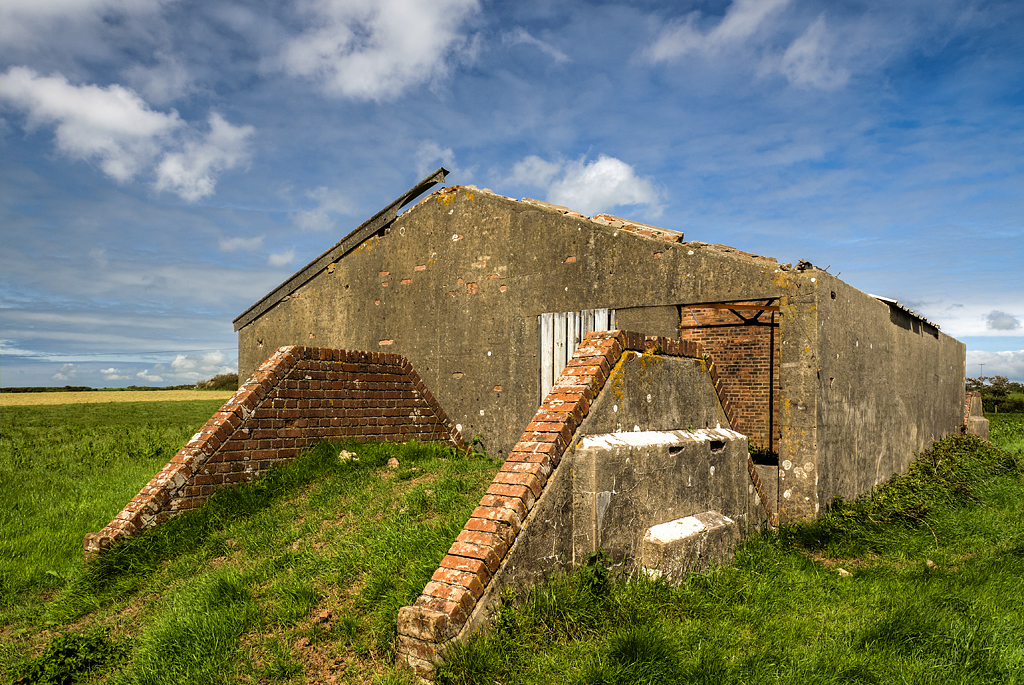
The remains of RAF Talbenny's bomb store

Most of the airfield's runways, tracks and buildings have gone. Nearly all of the airfield's infrastructure was demolished in the late 1950s / early 1960's, including the hangars and some sections of the runways. Some of the area has returned to farming. with a few Maycrete huts (prefabricated structures of reinforced concrete posts supporting a pitched roof frame with an infilling of sawdust concrete panels) and Nissen huts remaining, utilised for farm storage.

== See also ==
- List of former Royal Air Force stations
- RAF Dale, built as a satellite station for RAF Talbenny
- List of Royal Air Force aircraft squadrons
- List of ferry units of the Royal Air Force
- List of Royal Air Force units & establishments
