= 1958 Abadan Martin PBM Mariner crash =

Aviation incident in Iran

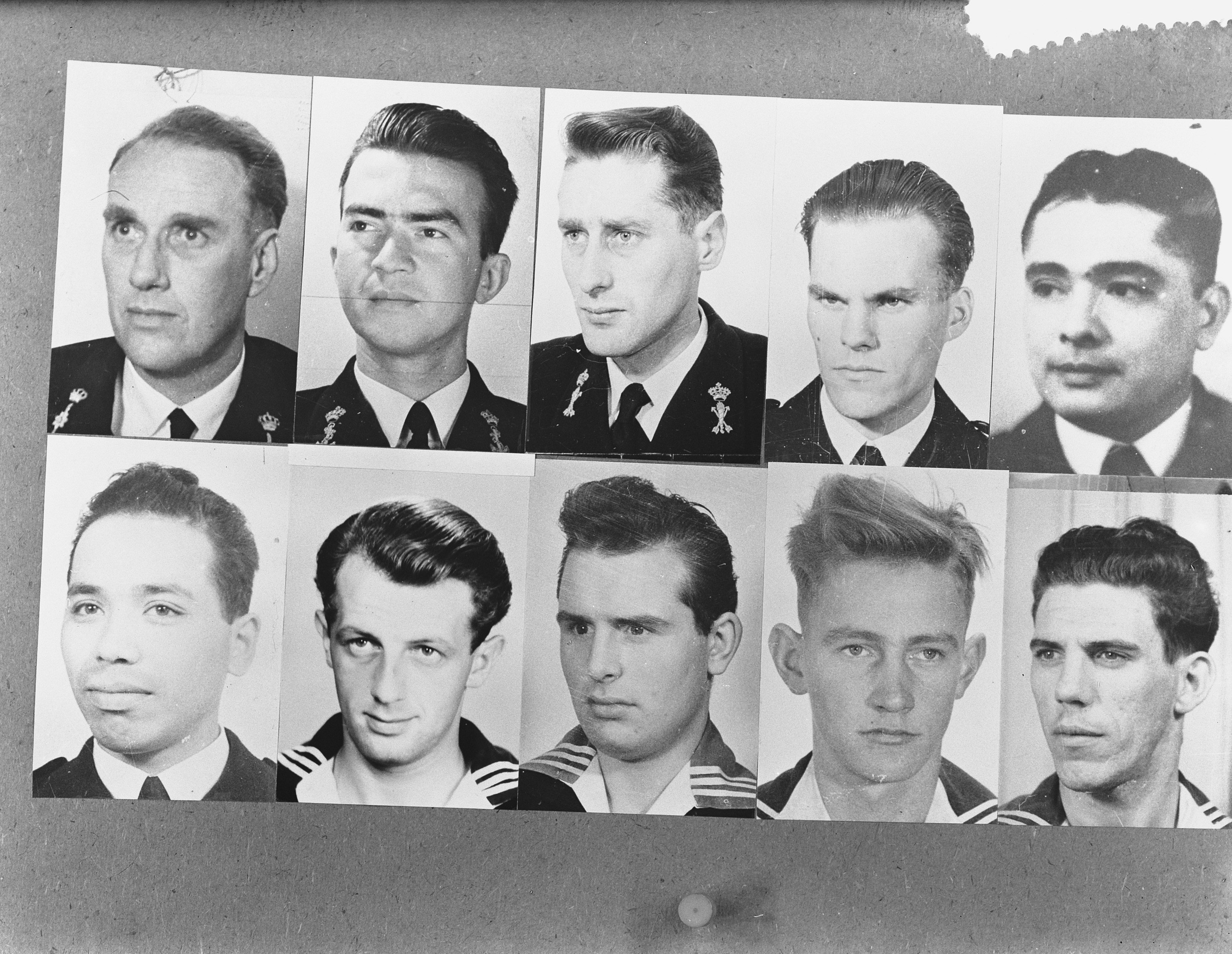
- Crew crashed Martin Mariner P 303 of the Navy Aviation Service in Abadan

Accident
- Date: Sep 10, 1958
- Summary: Mechanical failure during takeoff
- Site: Abadan Airport, Iran

Aircraft
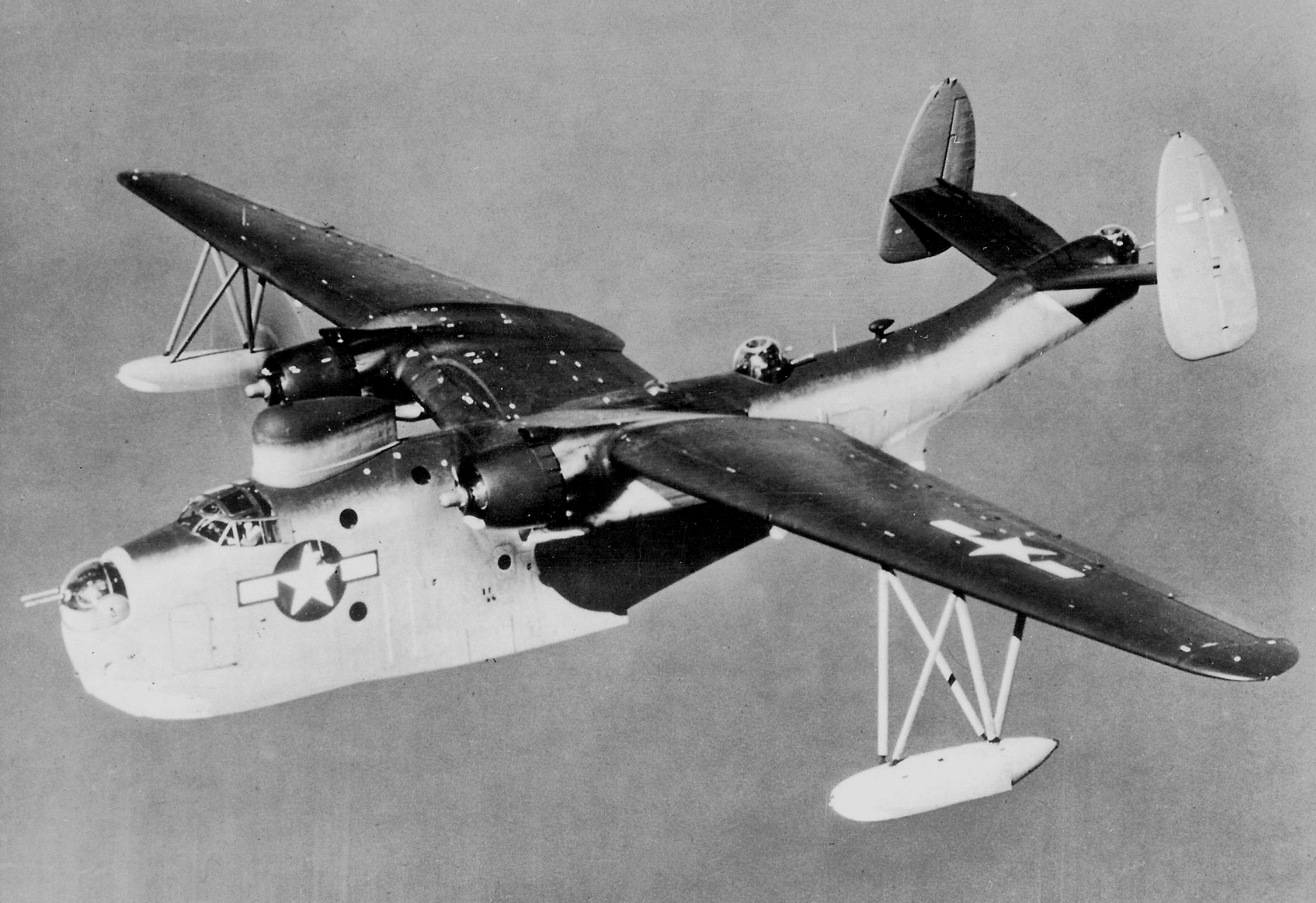
- Aircraft type: Martin PBM Mariner
- Operator: Netherlands Naval Aviation Service
- Registration: P-303 (16-303)
- Flight origin: Biak, Dutch East Indies
- Destination: Netherlands
- Occupants: 10
- Fatalities: 10
- Survivors: 0

The Martin PBM Mariner crash in Abadan occurred on September 10, 1958, when a Martin PBM-5A Mariner seaplane, operating as part of the Netherlands Naval Aviation Service, crashed during a technical stop at Abadan Airport, Iran. The crash resulted in the deaths of all ten crew members aboard.

== Aircraft ==
The aircraft involved was a Martin PBM-5A Mariner, a maritime patrol seaplane used by several naval forces for reconnaissance and anti-submarine warfare. The aircraft, registered as P-303 (or 16-303), was part of the Netherlands Naval Aviation Service and was in transit from Biak, Dutch East Indies (modern-day Indonesia), to the Netherlands.

== Incident ==
On September 10, 1958, after the aircraft had made a technical stop in Abadan for repairs, it attempted to take off to resume its journey. Shortly after takeoff, the plane experienced a mechanical failure involving an oil leak from one of its engines. The issue caused the unintended activation of the thrust reverser, causing the aircraft to lose control and crash several kilometers from the airport. All 10 crew members were killed in the incident.

== Investigation and Cause ==
The investigation into the crash determined that the primary cause was the unintended activation of the thrust reverser, caused by a mechanical fault in the engine. This resulted in the loss of control during takeoff, leading to the crash.

== Burial and Memorial ==
Following the crash, the remains of the ten crew members were initially buried at Palm Grove Cemetery in Abadan, where a military funeral ceremony was held. The ceremony included participation from local military personnel and diplomats. As the incident occurred during a period of close cooperation between Iran and the Netherlands, it was marked by a somber yet formal atmosphere, reflecting the shared respect for the victims of the tragedy.

In 2002, following a request from the families of the deceased and in cooperation with the Dutch government, the remains of the crew members were exhumed from their graves in Abadan and repatriated to the Netherlands. They were reburied at Duinrust Cemetery in Katwijk aan Zee, where a memorial was erected in their honor. The memorial includes the names of all ten crew members who perished in the crash.

The reburial ceremony in the Netherlands took place with full military honors and was attended by Dutch officials, the families of the crew, and representatives from the Netherlands Naval Aviation Service. The Dutch national anthem was played, and a formal memorial service was conducted to commemorate the fallen personnel.

== See also ==
- 1958 in aviation
- Netherlands Naval Aviation Service
