= No. 517 Squadron RAF =

Defunct flying squadron of the Royal Air Force

- Active: 11 August 1943 – 21 June 1946
- Country: United Kingdom
- Branch: Royal Air Force
- Role: Meteorological squadron
- Part of: No. 19 Group RAF, Coastal Command
- Mottos: Latin: Non Nobis Laboramus (Translation: "We work not for ourselves")

Insignia
- Squadron Badge: Two cubit arms erased, holding a flash of lightning
- Squadron Codes: X9 (1943–1946)

No. 517 Squadron RAF was a meteorological squadron of the Royal Air Force during the Second World War.

== History ==
No. 517 Squadron was formed on 11 August 1943 at RAF St Eval, Cornwall, when No. 1404 (Meteorological) Flight RAF was re-numbered. It was equipped with Lockheed Hudsons and Handley Page Hampdens, which it flew daily out into the Atlantic to collect meteorological data. Between September and November 1943 four United States Army Air Forces Flying Fortresses were temporarily attached to the squadron, awaiting the arrival of adapted Handley Page Halifaxes. By November 1943 the squadron had re-equipped with the Halifax and then moved to RAF St Davids in Wales. Two further moves followed, one to RAF Brawdy in February 1944 and then after the war to RAF Chivenor where the squadron was disbanded on 21 June 1946.

== Aircraft operated ==
Aircraft operated by No. 517 Squadron RAF
From	To	Aircraft	Version	Notes
August 1943	September 1943	Lockheed Hudson	Mk.III	
August 1943	October 1943	Handley Page Hampden	Mk.I	
September 1943	November 1943	Flying Fortress	B-17F	4 USAAF aircraft on attachment from 379th Bomber Squadron USAAF
November 1943	June 1946	Handley Page Halifax	Mk.V	
February 1945	June 1946	Handley Page Halifax	Mk.III	

== Squadron bases ==
Bases and airfields used by No. 517 Squadron RAF
From	To	Base	Remark
11 August 1943	26 November 1943	RAF St Eval, Cornwall	
26 November 1943	1 February 1944	RAF St Davids, Pembrokeshire, Wales	Det. at RAF Tiree, Hebrides, Scotland
1 February 1944	26 November 1945	RAF Brawdy, Pembrokeshire, Wales	
26 November 1945	21 June 1946	RAF Chivenor, Devon	

== See also ==
- List of Royal Air Force aircraft squadrons
