= HMS Harrier (shore establishment) =

Former Royal Navy shore establishment in Pembrokeshire, Wales

Coordinates: 51°41′30″N 05°10′50″W

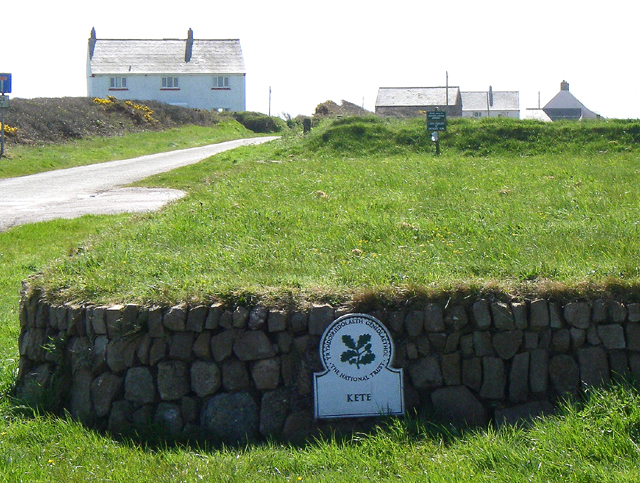
- Looking south from the car park at 'Kete'. A present-day view of the site of HMS Harrier

History

United Kingdom
- Name: HMS Harrier
- Commissioned: 1 February 1948
- Decommissioned: 2 January 1961

General characteristics
- Class & type: Stone frigate

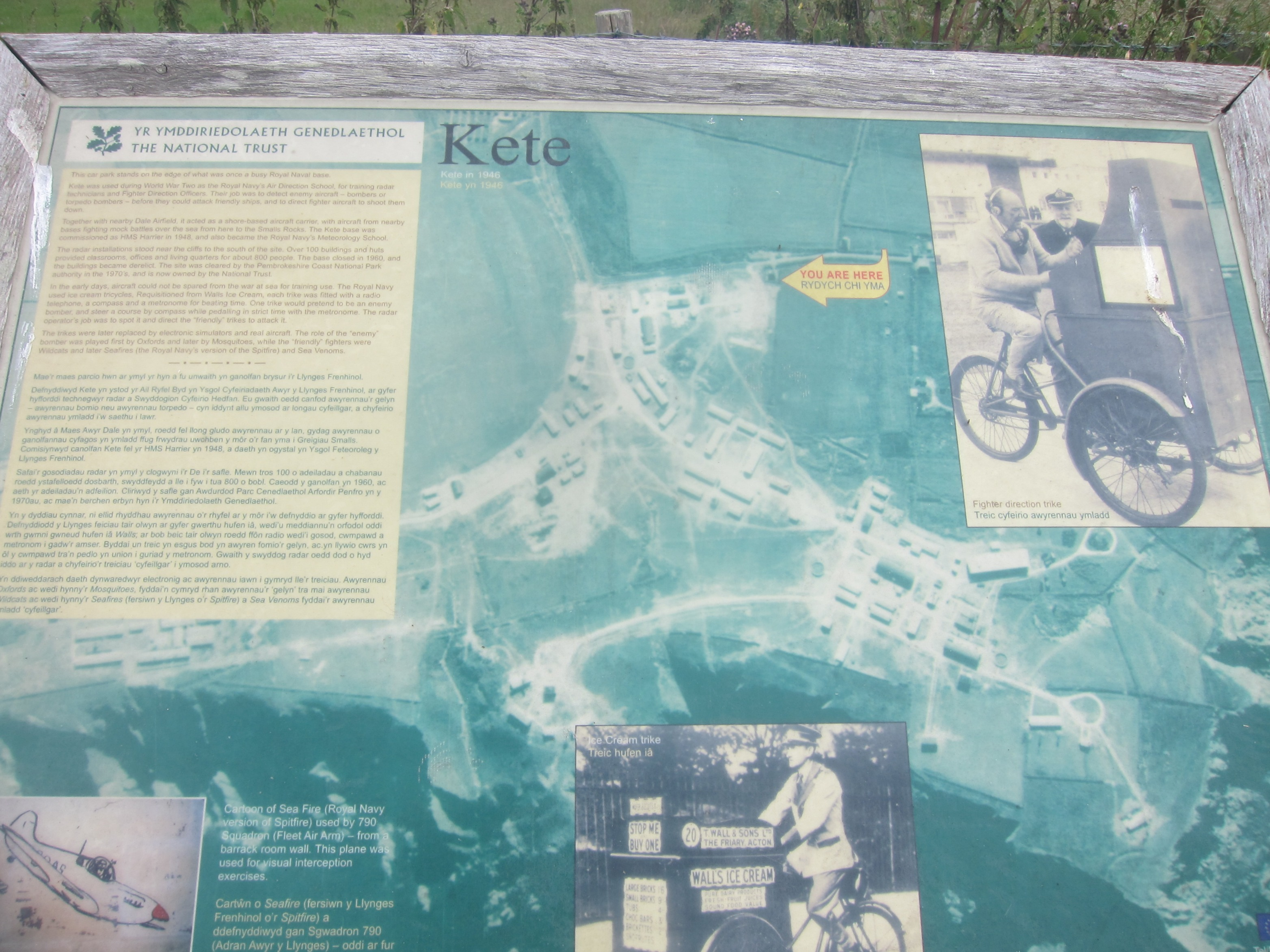
National Trust information board relating to site at Kete

HMS Harrier was a shore establishment of the Royal Navy, located at Kete, Pembrokeshire. It was commissioned on 1 February 1948 and was the home of the RN School of Aircraft Direction from the end of the Second World War, opened on 1 January 1945, until 1961, when the Aircraft Direction Officer Training returned to RNAS Yeovilton (HMS Heron). The site at Kete was ideal for air interception exercises, with the centre located 1 mile South of RNAS Dale (HMS Goldcrest), from where the live interception flights were provided from, and it had a wide sector over the sea.

The Aircraft Direction Centre was situated on the coast 0.5 miles (0.80 km) South East of the village of Dale and 0.25 miles (0.40 km) North of St. Anne's Head, the Western entrance point of Milford Haven waterway. The town of Milford Haven lies 5 miles (8.0 km) East, with Haverfordwest lying 11 miles (18 km) North East and Pembroke Dock lying 10 miles (16 km) South East.

== History ==
The site was originally RAF Kete, an early warning radar, Chain Home Low, site, it was taken over by the Royal Navy in 1943. Construction began for a Fighter Direction School in 1944 and this was followed by the Royal Naval School of Meteorology. The whole site became a satellite of HMS Goldcrest (RNAS Dale) and opened on 1 January 1945 as HMS Goldcrest II. In 1948 it was commissioned as HMS Harrier. The site closed in 1961.

=== Royal Navy Fighter Direction ===
During the Norwegian campaign in 1940, the aircraft carrier HMS Ark Royal’s Air Signals Officer, Lieutenant Commander Charles Coke, had to rely on RDF detection and tracking reports for enemy aircraft activity, from the carriers’ accompanying cruisers, HMS Sheffield or HMS Curlew, due to Ark Royal not being fitted with any radar. These reports were sent to the carrier via wireless telegraph Morse code. There were no fighter direction facilities aboard the carrier.

Coke used a corner of the aircraft carrier's Bridge Wireless Office, a Telegraphist who wrote down the RDF reports from the cruisers, and a Bigsworth Board, a portable device used by air observers, which was roughly two feet across and had pantograph-plotting arm fitted, which was a small mechanical device to solve the wind triangle. This was used by Coke to work out the course and airspeed to track, and later the heading and airspeed to intercept.

Using Morse code, Coke sent his information to the carrier's fighter aircraft via wireless telegraph. Initially, only the incoming enemy's location, course, and airspeed was passed to the aircraft carrier's fighters. Coke called this the "informative method" of interception and it was left to the fighter pilots to work out an intercept. However, Coke later worked out how he could track the carrier's fighters, with dead reckoning and a regular radar check, enabling him to order the course, airspeed and sometimes altitude to intercept. This was known as the "directive method".

Coke attended the Naval Air Division in the Admiralty in May 1941 to arrange for his next duty, after completing his tour on Ark Royal. Following on from his experiences, he was posted to RNAS Yeovilton (HMS Heron), in Somerset, to set up fighter direction school with a programme and he devised a three-week training course of theoretical and practical tasks. Promoted to Commander, Coke had planned to use aircraft services to enable students to get the experience of using the RDF in live intercepts, however, not enough Fleet Air Arm aircraft services were available. Therefore, ice cream vendor tricycles were fitted out with an aircraft compass, R/T equipment and a metronome, and screened to reduce visibility to a couple of yards so that the ‘enemy’ could only be seen when the target had been successfully acquired and control the speed at which the ‘pilot’ of the trike intercepted their target. This was done using the aircraft compass and instructions from the student Fighter Direction Officers (FDOs). They were situated in the airfield control tower and used a polar grid, a series of concentric circles centred on a common point, with a series of lines passing through it denoting angles, to calculate the direction and speed needed to intercept.

At the end of 1941 Coke was replaced by Lieutenant Commander Archie Fleming RN, then in July 1943, the Fighter Direction School moved across Yeovilton airfield and was located in Speckington Manor, with Commander Philip Yorke in charge.

=== Royal Naval School of Aircraft Direction ===
The Fighter Direction School had been operating at RNAS Yeovilton (HMS Heron), however, the existing school was unable to meet the demand for Air Direction Officers. It was a lodger unit at a full RNAS Yeovilton. A new Fighter Direction School for the Royal Navy was constructed at Kete, 0.5 miles (1 km) down the coast from RNAS Dale (HMS Goldcrest), in Pembrokeshire, on the coast. The new facility was known as the RN Aircraft Direction Centre (RNADC), RNADC Kete. On 30 August 1945 790 Naval Air Squadron, the Fighter Direction Training Unit, relocated to RNAS Dale, to provide live interception flights for the Air Direction School. The squadron operated many different types of aircraft.

Ground instruction for trainee Direction Officers was still based on Coke's tricycle method. A Wren on a tricycle represented an enemy and pedalled in time to a metronome. A trainee Fighter Direction Offer on another tricycle, represented a Fighter. Another trainee Fighter Direction Offer used a radio, to direct the tricycle-based trainee Fighter Direction Offer, to intercept the tricycle-based Wren. This approach continued in use, until controllable artificial radar echoes became available, during the 1950s.

On 1 February 1948 the facility was officially commissioned as HMS Harrier. However, 790 Naval Air Squadron had already relocated to RNAS Culdrose (HMS Seahawk), Cornwall, in December 1947 and following this, in March 1948 RNAS Dale (HMS Goldcrest) and it's satellite airfield RNAS Brawdy (HMS Goldcrest II) were placed into Care & Maintenance Status. At the end of 1949, 790 Fighter Direction Training Unit disbanded at RNAS Culdrose. The civilian company, Airwork Services Ltd, was then contracted to provide the live interception flights from January 1950, operating out of RNAS Brawdy and its satellite, RAF St Davids. This was known as the Air Direction Training Unit (ADTU) and it initially operated with de Havilland Sea Mosquito and Taylorcraft Auster V aircraft. Later on, acquiring de Havilland Sea Hornet, Supermarine Attacker and de Havilland Sea Venom aircraft.

=== Royal Naval School of Meteorology ===
The RN School of Meteorology, moved from the Royal Naval College, Greenwich to HMS Harrier in October 1946. Upon opening at Kete, the school had only three members of staff. The first course was three months long and was also the last course to train midshipman. In 1947 the Naval Airman (Met) branch formed part of the Fleet Air Arm, and the Women's Royal Naval Service, and rating (Met) courses, moved to Kete from RNAS Lee-on-Solent (HMS Daedalus), Hampshire.

The meteorological training relocated to RNAS Culdrose (HMS Seahawk), where it later included Oceanography, after fourteen years at Kete. Rating training moved in 1959 and the rest of the school and officers in the following year.

=== Royal Naval Radar Plotter Training School ===
The third Royal Naval school to be based at Kete, was the RN Radar Plotter Training School, which in September 1949 moved from HMS Wildfire (1964 shore establishment), in Sheerness, to HMS Harrier. Over the next decade the school operated at Kete until July 1960, when it transferred to HMS Dryad (shore establishment).

== Closure ==
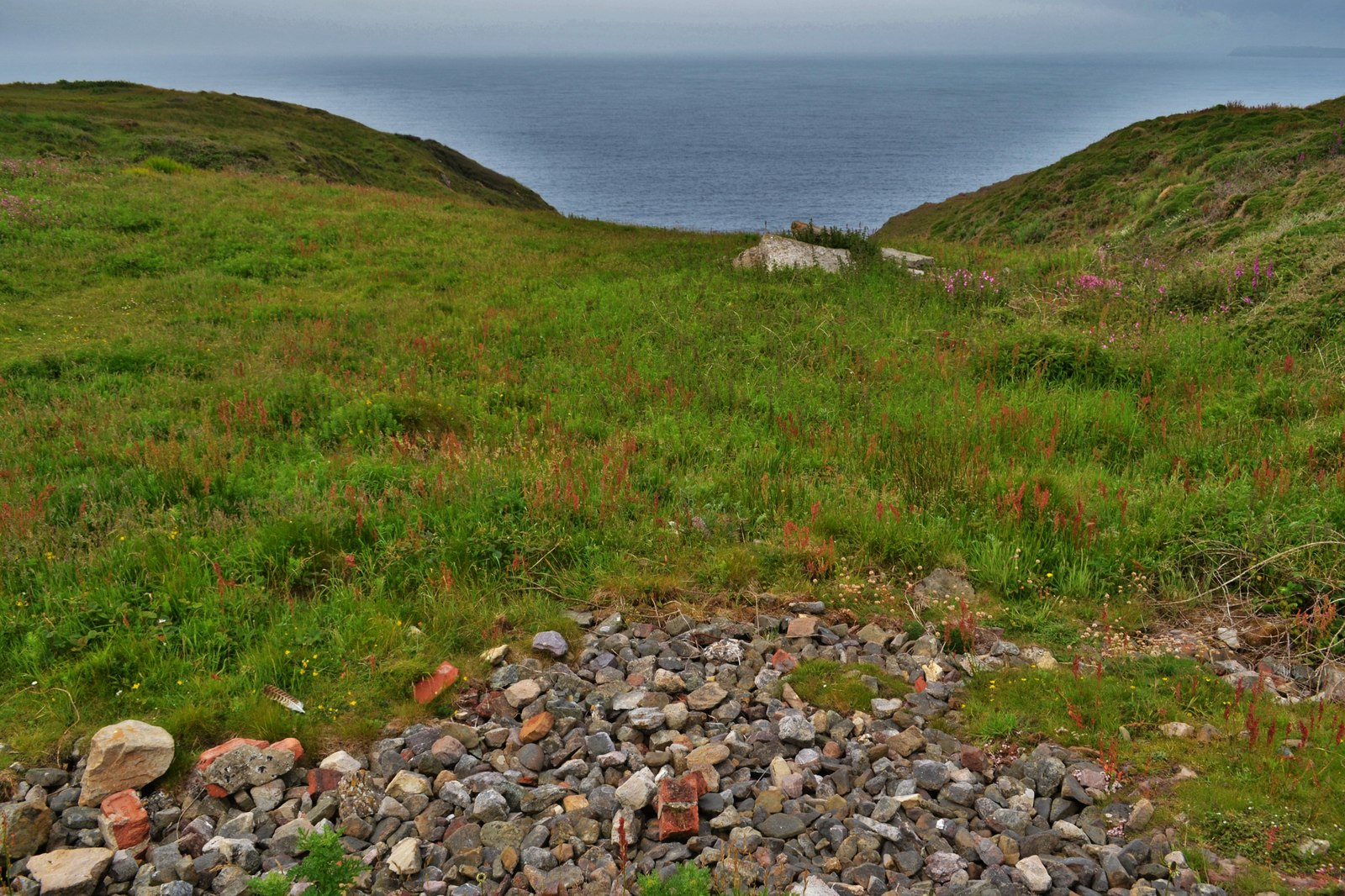
Remains of demolished buildings at Kete

In 1959 the Royal Naval School of Meteorology started to relocate by training course. The rating training moved to RNAS Culdrose (HMS Seahawk) in 1959, and this was followed by the officers’ courses, along with the rest of the school, during 1960. In July 1960 the Radar Plotter Training relocated to HMS Dryad (shore establishment), and by the end of the year the Aircraft Direction Officer Training had returned, after fifteen years at Kete, to RNAS Yeovilton (HMS Heron). RNADC Kete was paid off on 2 January 1961. The site was later sold to the Dale Castle estate.

There is very little left of the complex, which had many buildings and huts. Rubble can be found by the coast path in a field, but these are now back to pasture and the boundaries have been restored. A couple of existing residences, 'Glenshane' and 'Kete House' are associated with the previous establishment.

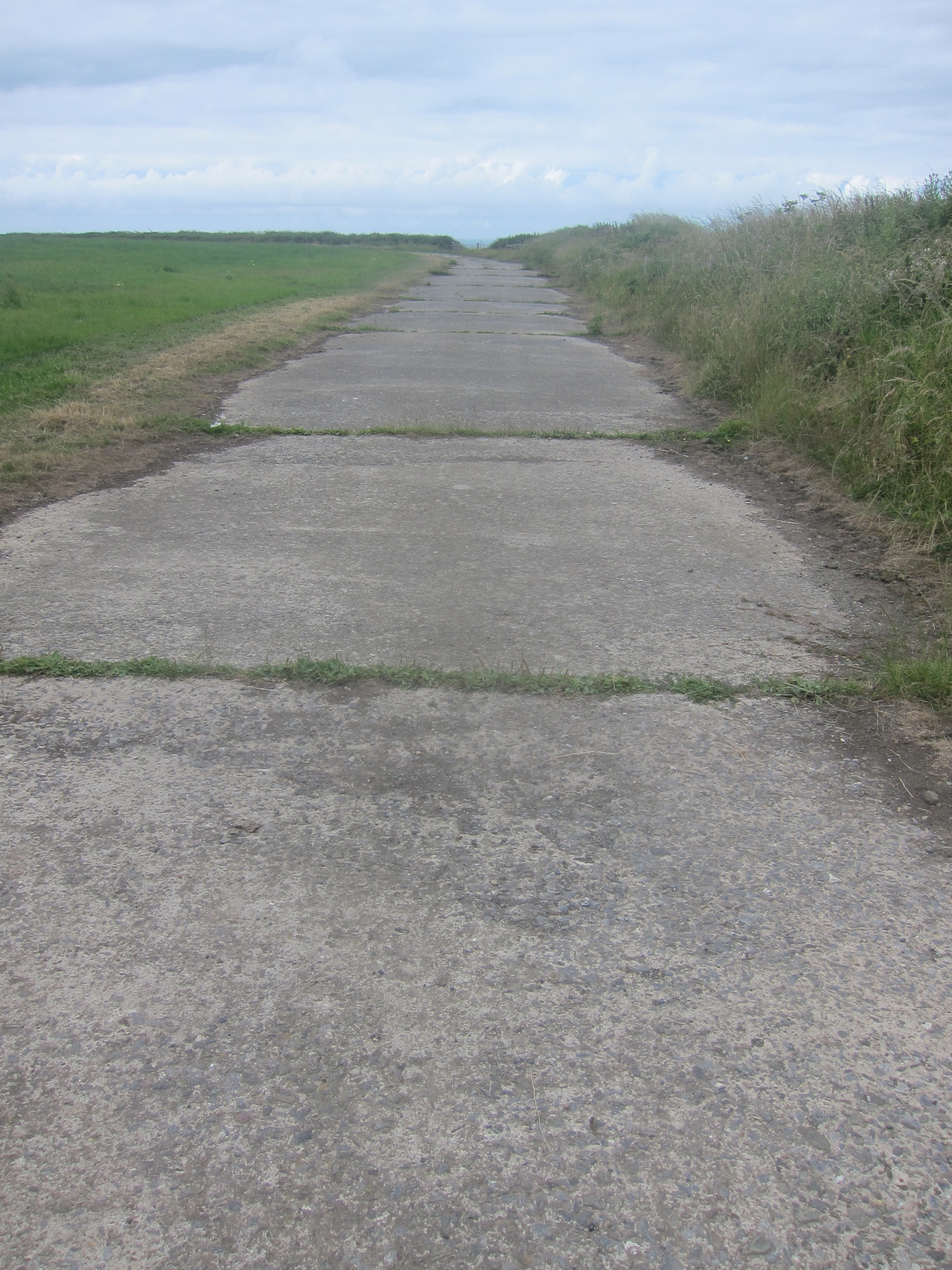
Access track to former RNADC Kete

== See also ==
- RNAS Dale (HMS Goldcrest)
- RAF Brawdy
- RAF St Davids
- Fleet Requirements and Aircraft Direction Unit
- Airwork Services

== Bibliography ==
- Ballance, Theo (2016). The Squadrons and Units of the Fleet Air Arm. Air-Britain. ISBN 978 0 85130 489 2.
- Howse, Derek (1993). Radar at Sea: The Royal Navy in World War 2. London, UK: Palgrave Macmillan. ISBN 978-0333584491.
