= RNAS Dale =

Former Royal Naval Air Station in Pembrokeshire, Wales

RNAS Dale HMS Goldcrest RAF Dale
- Dale Aerodrome
- Dale, Pembrokeshire in Wales

Site information
- Type: Royal Naval Air Station
- Owner: Admiralty; Air Ministry
- Operator: Royal Navy; Royal Air Force
- Controlled by: Fleet Air Arm (1943-1948); RAF Coastal Command (1942-1943) * No. 19 Group RAF
- Condition: Disused

Location
- Shown within Pembrokeshire RNAS Dale (the United Kingdom)
- Coordinates: 51°42′55″N 005°11′30″W

Site history
- Built: 1941-1942
- In use: June 1942-September 1943 (Royal Air Force); September 1943-October 1948 (Fleet Air Arm)
- Fate: Farmland
- Battles/wars: European theatre of World War II

Garrison information
- Past commanders: Lieutenant Commander(P) J.H. Gibbons, 30 August 1943

Airfield information
- Elevation: 59 metres (194 ft) AMSL
Runways
Direction	Length and surface
04/22	1,065 metres (3,494 ft) x 45m Tarmac
11/29	1,280 metres (4,199 ft) x 45m Tarmac
16/34	1,184 metres (3,885 ft) x 45m Tarmac

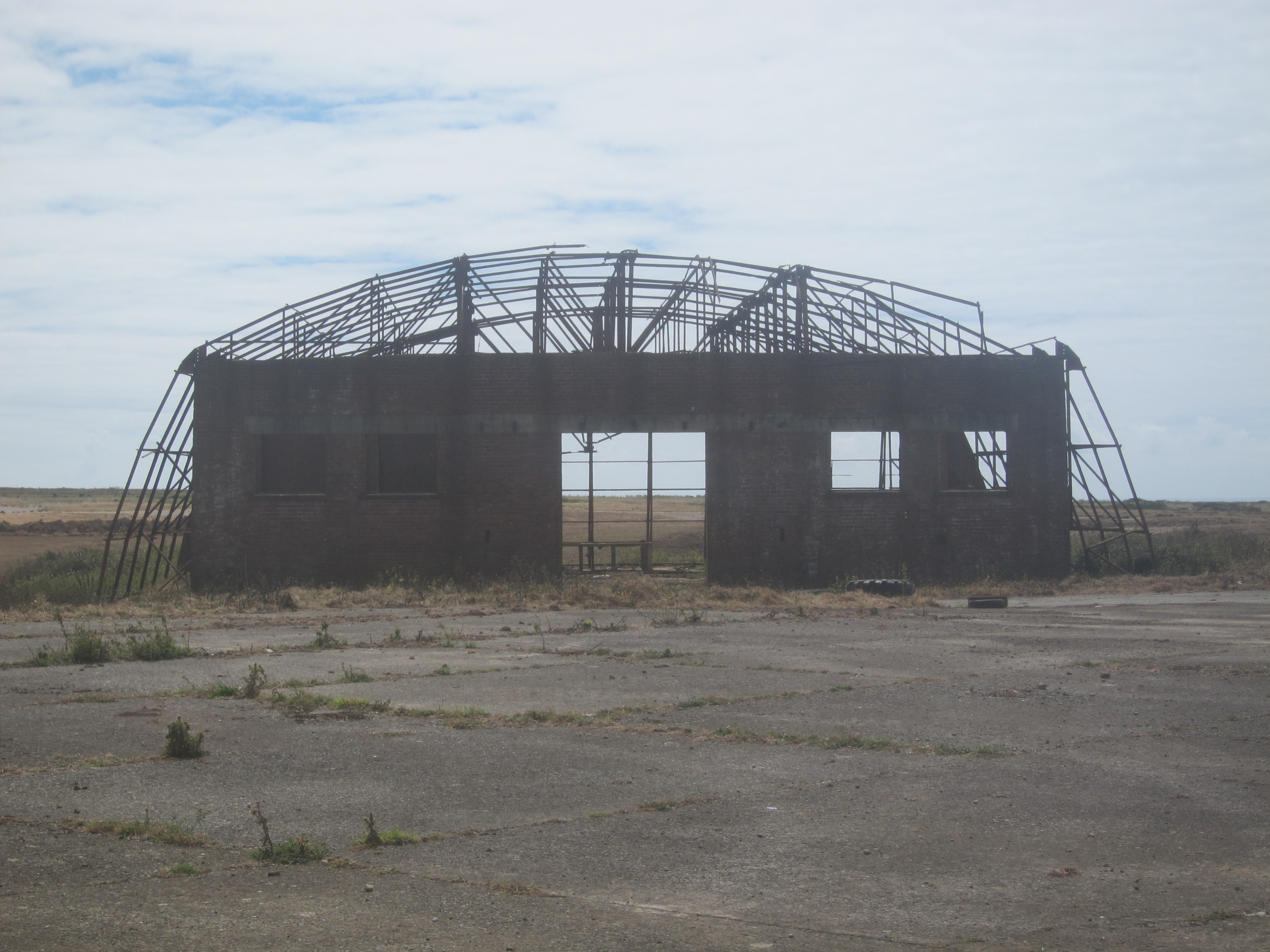
The skeleton framework of a former hangar at RNAS Dale

Royal Naval Air Station Dale, more commonly known as RNAS Dale; (commissioned HMS Goldcrest), is a former Royal Navy Naval Air Station, located 10 miles (16 km) South West of Haverfordwest in Pembrokeshire, Wales. It was operational between 1942 and 1948, being used by both the Royal Air Force (1942–1943) and the Royal Navy (1943–1948).

The village of Dale in Pembrokeshire is situated 0.5 miles (0.80 km) south-east of the airfield, which itself lies adjacent to the coast, 2 miles (3.2 km) north of St. Ann's Head, the western entrance to the Milford Haven waterway. The town of Milford Haven lies 5 miles (8 km) east and Pembroke Dock lies 11 miles south-east. Notable landmarks are St. Anne's Head and Milford Haven, with Skomer Island lying 3.5 miles (5.6 km) north-west and the small island of Skokholm lying 2.5 miles (4 km) south-west.

== History ==
=== Station design ===
Construction of the airfield began between the villages of Dale and Marloes in 1941. RAF Dale opened in the 1 June 1942. The airfield had three runways, constructed of tarmac and concrete in a triangular pattern, measuring: 1065 m (3495 ft) long, 1285 m (4215 ft) long, and 1458 m (4785 ft) long. The area north west of the runways contained associated buildings. Initially it was to be named RAF Marloes, planned as a No. 19 Group RAF Satellite Landing Ground (SLG) to nearby RAF Talbenny, but the name was changed to RAF Dale instead.

=== RAF Coastal Command ===
The first RAF unit to use RAF Dale was No. 304 Polish Bomber Squadron, twice between June 1942 and April 1943, spending November and December 1942 at RAF Talbenny. It used the Vickers Wellington IC, for air/sea rescue, anti-submarine patrols, bombing raids and convoy protection, supporting No. 311 (Czech) Sqn, which also arrived in Pembrokeshire in June 1942, as part of RAF Coastal Command. It departed for RAF Docking in March 1943.

The Coastal Command Development Unit RAF moved to Dale, from RAF Tain. The CCDU operated many different types of aircraft, evaluating new equipment and developing new tactics. 303 Ferry Training Unit from Talbenny also moved to Dale, this was a temporary measure, while lighting was being installed at the former.

=== Royal Navy ===
RAF Dale was transferred to the Admiralty, in exchange for RNAS Angle (HMS Goldcrest), in September 1943. It was transferred on 5 September from No. 19 Group RAF, and commissioned, as HMS Goldcrest, on the 7 September 1943.

794 Naval Air Firing Unit was the first FAA unit to arrive in September 1943, it remained at Dale for two months before leaving in the November. However, at this point the Admiralty set about improving the airfield to support up to six naval air squadrons. A new concrete apron was added; a standard RN pattern four-story control tower was built; concrete huts and at least two naval Mainhill hangars to supplement the existing T2 and Blister hangars were constructed.

In March 1944, 762 Twin Engine Conversion Unit arrived and then six months later, 748 No 10 Naval OTU relocated to Dale. Work began on the new Fighter Direction School, ½ mile down the coast at Kete, in the latter part of 1944, and the facility was completed in 1945. Then in August 1945, 748 OTU moved out and 790 Fighter Direction Training Unit moved in, beginning live interception flights for the new R.N. Air Direction School, at Kete.

In December 1945, 762 Twin Engined Conversion Unit departed Dale, meaning only 790 NAS was undertaking flying operations at the airbase. On the 1 January 1946, Dale received RNAS Brawdy as a satellite airfield and later that month 784 Night Fighter Training Squadron moved there. However, it disbanded later that year at Brawdy, in the September.

861 Naval Air Squadron formed at Dale, on the 16 September 1946, for the Royal Netherlands Navy, the squadron worked up until ready to embark, leaving Dale on the 22 February 1947.

On 13 December 1947, when 790 NAS departed RNAS Dale, the air station closed to flying. On 31 March 1948, Dale was reduced to Care & Maintenance Status and then it was paid off, on the 31 October 1948.

== Royal Air Force Operational History ==
=== Anti-ship and anti-submarine warfare ===
No. 304 (Land of Silesia) Polish Bomber Squadron

No. 304 Polish Bomber Squadron arrived at RAF Dale on the 13 June 1942 from RAF Tiree. It was equipped with Vickers Wellington IC aircraft. It flew operations over the Bay of Biscay and the Western Approaches, tasked with anti-submarine patrols and shipping attacks.

The squadron was involved in notable attacks alongside No. 311 (Czech) Sqn from RAF Talbenny, with a raid on La Pallice, the deep water port of La Rochelle, in occupied France in August 1942, and this was followed up by a successful anti-shipping operation in the Gironde estuary.

On the 30 March 1943 the squadron moved to RAF Docking.

=== Coastal Command Development Unit ===
In April 1943 the Coastal Command Development Unit RAF (CCDU) took over RAF Dale relocating from RAF Tain. The units initial purpose was to undertake service trials of all radar equipment such as air-to-surface-vessel (ASV) radar to assist RAF Coastal Command operations. It was required to investigate the tactics for the use of all types of radar equipment in RAF Coastal Command aircraft, but its role changed to cover both service and tactical trials of all RAF Coastal Command aircraft and equipment, including trials of anti-submarine warfare equipment and techniques. The unit operated a wide variety of aircraft types to carry out the trials:

- Consolidated B-24 Liberator GR Mk.V - one aircraft
- Handley Page Halifax GR.II - one aircraft
- Vickers Wellington B Mark X - two aircraft
- Vickers Warwick GR Mk II - one aircraft
- Bristol Beaufighter TF Mk.X - two aircraft
- Percival Proctor - a number of aircraft for communications flights.

In September 1943, as part of the swap between the Royal Air Force and Royal Navy with Dale and Angle airfields, the Coastal Command Development Unit (CCDU) moved to Angle.

=== Ferry Flight Operations ===
No. 303 Ferry Training Unit RAF arrived from RAF Dale's parent, RAF Talbenny, while a Drem Lighting System was being installed at the latter. It was equipped with Vickers Wellington aircraft. The unit's primary role was aircraft preparation and aircrew training for overseas deployment flights. Later, Vickers Warwick and Lockheed Ventura aircraft were introduced.

== Royal Navy Operational History ==
=== Twin Engine Conversion Course ===
762 Naval Air Squadron was a Twin Engine Conversion Unit. It provided a Twin Engine Conversion Course, operating Bristol Beaufort I a twin-engined torpedo bomber and the T. II trainer aircraft; twin-engine Bristol Beaufighter IIF night fighter; Bristol Blenheim IV twin-engine light bomber; Airspeed Oxford twin-engine trainer and Vickers Wellington GR. XI twin-engined, long-range medium bomber, aircraft. It moved to RNAS Dale from RNAS Lee-on-Solent (HMS Daedalus) on 31 March 1944, then departed for RNAS Halesworth (HMS Sparrowhawk) on the 3 December 1945.

=== Fighter OTU ===
748 Naval Air Squadron was the No. 10 Naval Operational Training Unit. It moved here from RNAS Yeovilton (HMS Heron), on the 1 September 1944. It was equipped with North American Harvard trainer aircraft, and also variants of Vought Corsair, Fairey Firefly, Grumman Hellcat, Supermarine Seafire and Grumman Wildcat aircraft, providing refresher flying on the latter five aircraft. The squadron departed for RNAS St Merryn (HMS Vulture), on the 14 August 1945.

=== Night Fighter School ===
784 Naval Air Squadron was a Night Fighter Training Squadron. It moved here from RNAS Drem (HMS Nighthawk), on the 15 January 1946, but operated from Dale's satellite airfield, RNAS Brawdy. The squadron was equipped with Fairey Firefly NF. I, a night fighter variant; Grumman Hellcat N.F. II, a night fighter version, fitted with an AN/APS-6 radar; and the North American Harvard II. It disbanded (at RNAS Brawdy) on the 10 September 1946, becoming 'B' flight of the existing Fighter Direction Training Unit at Dale, 790 Naval Air Squadron.

=== Royal Navy Aircraft Direction School ===
790 Naval Air Squadron was a Fighter Direction Training Unit. It moved here from RNAS Zeals (HMS Hummingbird), on the 30 August 1945. The squadron provided live interception flights for the Air Direction School, located 1 mile (2 km) South of RNAS Dale, at R.N. Aircraft Direction Centre. Kete. It used various aircraft types for this role: Twin-engined Avro Anson, the bi-plane de Havilland Dominie transport, Fairey Firefly I fighter and anti-submarine aircraft, de Havilland Mosquito FB.6 & B.25 and de Havilland Sea Mosquito TR.33 variants of the twin engine multi-role aircraft, the twin-engined Airspeed Oxford, various marks of Supermarine Seafire, naval version of the Supermarine Spitfire, and the Grumman Wildcat an American carrier-based fighter aircraft. The squadron moved to RNAS Culdrose (HMS Seahawk) on the 13 December 1944.

=== Other Units ===
==== Naval Air Firing Unit ====
794 Naval Air Squadron was a Naval Air Firing Unit. It moved here from RNAS Angle on the 10 September 1943. The squadron was equipped with four Boulton Paul Defiant TT. III, eight Miles Martinet TT. I, four Miles Master II, and sixteen Hawker Sea Hurricane aircraft. It left for RNAS Henstridge (HMS Dipper) on the 22 November 1943.

==== First Line Fighter Squadrons ====
809 Naval Air Squadron was a Single Seat Fighter Squadron. It disembarked from HMS Stalker on the 19 February 1944 and then moved to RAF Long Kesh on the 20 March 1944. It was equipped with Supermarine Seafire L. III.

897 Naval Air Squadron was a Single Seat Fighter Squadron. It disembarked from HMS Stalker on the 18 February 1944 an then departed for to RNAS Lee-on-Solent (HMS Daedalus) on the 26 February 1944. The squadron operated Supermarine Seafire L. IIc.

861 Naval Air Squadron was formed at RNAS Dale on the 16 September 1946 as a Royal Netherlands Navy (RNN) squadron with four Fairey Firefly aircraft, and worked-up. Embarked in the HNLMS Karel Doorman (QH1) on the 22 February 1947.

1770 Naval Air Squadron was a Two seat Fighter Squadron, it arrived here from RNAS Ayr (HMS Wagtail) on the 16 November 1944, and then embarked on HMS Indefatigable on the 21 November 1944. It operated Fairey Firefly I aircraft.

==== RNAS Brawdy ====
On the 1 January 1946, RAF Brawdy was transferred to the Admiralty, on loan, as a satellite airfield for RNAS Dale and was commissioned as HMS Goldcrest II.

== Current use ==
Now owned privately by a local farmer, in May 2010, an illegal rave was held on the site, attracting 2,500 people. Dyfed-Powys Police were forced eventually to create roadblocks to stop further attendees joining, and release an announcement on local media. After the rave ended on Monday 31 May, six men aged between 23 and 52 were charged with offences under Section 136 of the Licensing Act for carrying out unlicensed licensable activity.

== See also ==
- List of air stations of the Royal Navy
- List of former Royal Air Force stations
- RAF Talbenny
- RAF Brawdy
- HMS Harrier (shore establishment)
