= 762 Naval Air Squadron =

Inactive flying squadron of the Royal Navy's Fleet Air Arm

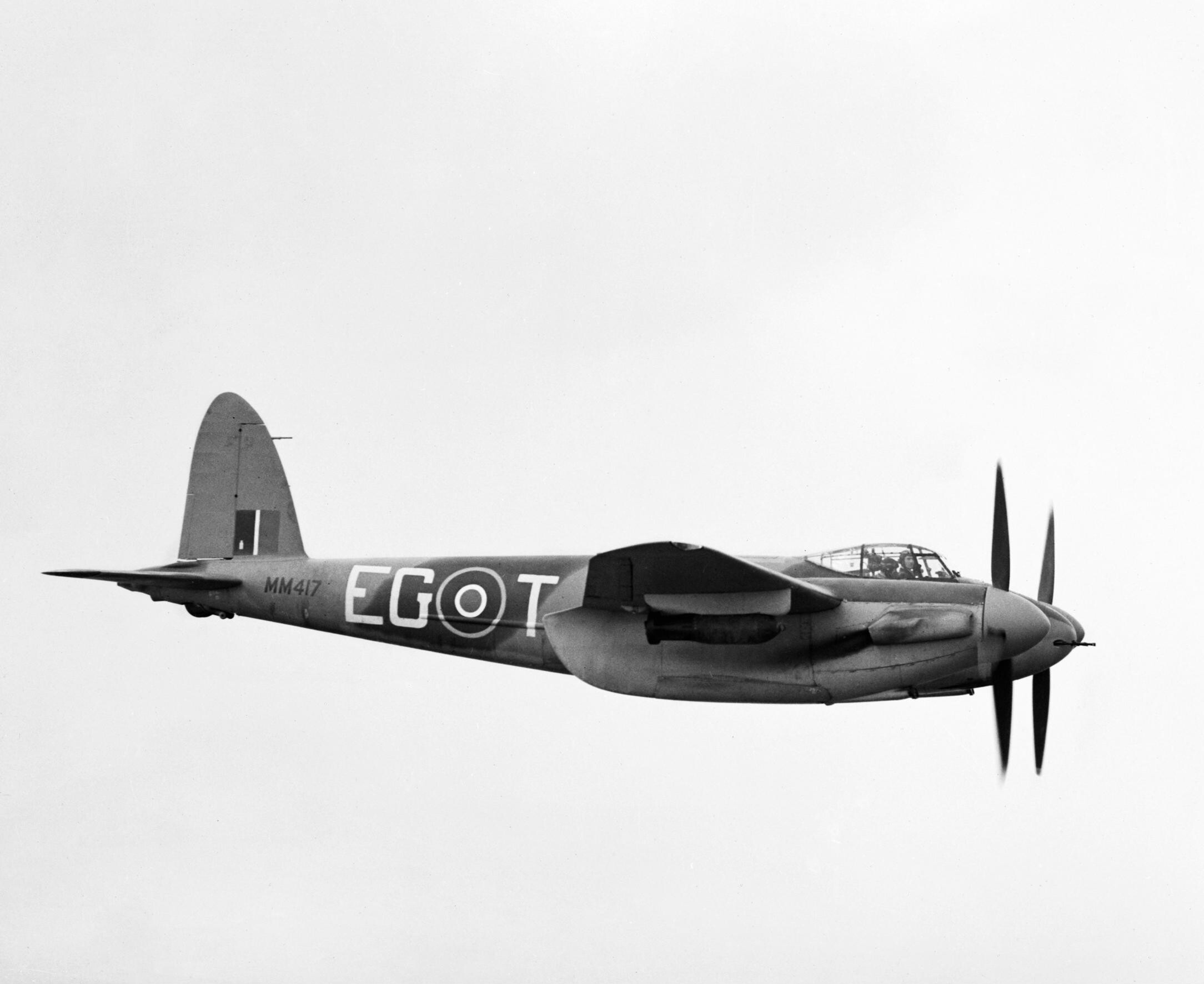
- de Havilland Mosquito FB Mk VI an example of the type used by 762 NAS
- Active: 1942–1943; 1944–1949
- Disbanded: 8 December 1949
- Country: United Kingdom
- Branch: Royal Navy
- Type: Fleet Air Arm Second Line Squadron
- Role: Advanced Flying Training School; Twin Engine Conversion Unit
- Size: Squadron
- Part of: Fleet Air Arm
- Aircraft: See Aircraft operated section for full list.

Insignia
- Identification Markings: P1A+ P2A+ (1944); HA3A+ (all types December 1945); FD5A+ & FD6A+ (January 1946); 400-476 (February 1947); 650-662 (Oxford May 1948); 450-466 (Mosquito May 1948)
- Fin Shore Codes: FD (February 1947); CW (May 1948)

762 Naval Air Squadron (762 NAS) was a Fleet Air Arm (FAA) naval air squadron of the United Kingdom’s Royal Navy (RN). It formed at HMS Heron, RNAS Yeovilton, in March 1942 as an Advanced Flying Training School. Almost immediately the squadron relocated to HMS Vulture, RNAS St Merryn, but before the end of the year, it was back at HMS Heron. The squadron disbanded nine months later. It reformed in 1944 at HMS Daedalus, RNAS Lee-on-Solent, as a Twin Engine Conversion Unit, but immediately moved to HMS Goldcrest, RNAS Dale, where it operated a variety of multi engined aircraft. At the end of 1945 the squadron moved to HMS Sparrowhawk, RNAS Halesworth and HMS Peregrine, RNAS Ford in quick succession. Now known as the Heavy Twin Conversion Unit it spent nearly two and a half years at HMS Peregrine, before relocating to HMS Seahawk, RNAS Culdrose, where it eventually disbanded at the end of 1949.

== History ==
=== Advanced Flying Training School (1942–1943) ===
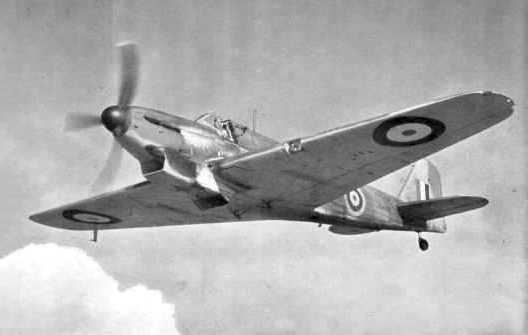
Fairey Fulmar Mk I, an example of those used by 762 NAS

762 Naval Air Squadron formed, on the 23 March 1942, at RNAS Yeovilton (HMS Heron) situated near Yeovil, Somerset, as an Advanced Flying Training School. It was initially equipped with Fairey Fulmar, a carrier-based reconnaissance and fighter aircraft and Miles Master, an advanced trainer aircraft.

Roughly three weeks later, on the 15 April 1942, the squadron relocated to RNAS St Merryn (HMS Vulture), located 7.35 miles (11.83 km) northeast of Newquay, Cornwall. It added Grumman Martlet, a carrier-based fighter aircraft, to its inventory in June 1942.

762 Naval Air Squadron remained at RNAS St Merryn (HMS Vulture) for the next seven months, however, on the 8 September 1942, the squadron moved back to RNAS Yeovilton (HMS Heron). Here it received Hawker Sea Hurricane, a navalised of the Hawker Hurricane fighter aircraft, for training and conversion. The squadron disbanded at RNAS Yeovilton (HMS Heron) on 9 June 1943.

=== Twin Engine Conversion Unit (1944–1949) ===
762 Naval Air Squadron reformed, on the 15 March 1944, at RNAS Lee-on-Solent (HMS Daedalus), situated near Lee-on-the-Solent, in Hampshire, approximately four miles west of Portsmouth, as the Twin Engine Conversion Unit. Two weeks later, on the 15 March 1944, 762 Naval Air Squadron moved to RNAS Dale (HMS Goldcrest), located 6.5 miles (10.5 km) west of Milford Haven, Pembrokeshire, Wales and here the squadron operated a variety of aircraft, using Bristol Beaufort Mk.I & T Mk. II, a British twin-engined torpedo bomber, Bristol Beaufighter Mark IIF, a British multirole combat aircraft, Bristol Blenheim Mk.IV, a light bomber and Airspeed Oxford, a twin-engined trainer aircraft. and from August, Vickers Wellington GR Mark XI a British twin-engined, long-range medium bomber.

762 Naval Air Squadron remained at RNAS Dale for just short of two years, moving to RNAS Halesworth (HMS Sparrowhawk), located 2 miles (3 km) north east of the town of Halesworth, Suffolk, England, on the 3 December 1945. However, six weeks later, the squadron was on the move again, this time relocating to RNAS Ford (HMS Peregrine), located at Ford, in West Sussex, England.

At this time the squadron was also operating de Havilland Mosquito, a multirole combat aircraft and de Havilland Sea Mosquito, a navalised Mosquito for Royal Navy use as a torpedo bomber, and it became known as the Heavy Twin Conversion Unit. It remained in this role and at RNAS Ford for around the next two and a half years, before moving to RNAS Culdrose (HMS Seahawk), near Helston on the Lizard Peninsula of Cornwall, on the 1 May 1948. 762 Naval Air Squadron disbanded, at RNAS Culdrose, on the 8 December 1949.

== Aircraft operated ==
The squadron has operated a number of different aircraft types, including:

- Fairey Fulmar Mk.I reconnaissance/fighter aircraft (March 1942 - June 1943)
- Fairey Fulmar Mk.II reconnaissance/fighter aircraft (March 1942 - June 1943)
- Miles Master I advanced trainer (June 1942 - June 1943)
- Grumman Martlet Mk I fighter aircraft (June 1942 - January 1943)
- Hawker Sea Hurricane Mk IA fighter aircraft (September 1942 - June 1943)
- Hawker Sea Hurricane Mk IB fighter aircraft (September 1942 - June 1943)
- Supermarine Spitfire Mk I fighter aircraft (February 1943 - June 1943)
- Bristol Beaufighter Mark IIF multirole combat aircraft (March 1944 - 1945)
- Bristol Beaufort Mk.I torpedo bomber (March 1944 - May 1944)
- Bristol Beaufort T Mk. II torpedo bomber (March 1944 - August 1946)
- Airspeed Oxford trainer aircraft (March 1944 - December 1949)
- Vickers Wellington GR Mark XI medium bomber (August 1944 - April 1945)
- de Havilland Mosquito FB Mk. VI fighter bomber (August 1945 - November 1949)
- de Havilland Mosquito T Mk III trainer aircraft (December 1945 - December 1949)
- de Havilland Mosquito B.35 bomber (1946)
- de Havilland Sea Mosquito TR Mk 33 torpedo bomber (November 1947 - November 1949)
- Avro Anson I multirole aircraft (1948)

== Naval air stations ==
762 Naval Air Squadron operated from a number of naval air stations of the Royal Navy, in Wales and England:

1942 - 1943

- Royal Naval Air Station Yeovilton (HMS Heron), Somerset, (23 March 1942 - 15 April 1942)
- Royal Naval Air Station St Merryn (HMS Vulture), Cornwall, (15 April 1942 - 8 September 1942)
- Royal Naval Air Station Yeovilton (HMS Heron), Somerset, (8 September 1942 - 9 June 1943)
- disbanded - (9 June 1943)

1944 - 1949

- Royal Naval Air Station Lee-on-Solent (HMS Daedalus), Hampshire, (15 March 1944 - 31 March 1944)
- Royal Naval Air Station Dale (HMS Goldcrest), Pembrokeshire, (31 March 1944 - 3 December 1945)
  - Royal Naval Air Station Inskip (HMS Nightjar), Lancashire, (Detachment 20 June 1945)
- Royal Naval Air Station Halesworth (HMS Sparrowhawk), Suffolk, (3 December 1945 - 15 January 1946)
- Royal Naval Air Station Ford (HMS Peregrine), West Sussex, (15 January 1946 - 1 May 1948)
- Royal Naval Air Station Culdrose (HMS Seahawk), Cornwall, (1 May 1948 - 8 December 1949)
- disbanded - (8 December 1949)

== Commanding officers ==
List of Commanding officers of 762 Naval Air Squadron with date of appointment:

1942 - 1943

- Lieutenant(A) R- McD Hall, RN, from 23 March 1942
- Lieutenant D.B.M Fiddes, DSO, RN, from 9 September 1942
- Lieutenant Commander(A) M.J.S. Newman, RN, from 29 March 1943
- disbanded - 9 June 1943

1944 - 1949

- Lieutenant Commander(A) S.J. Hawley, RNVR, from 14 March 1944
- Lieutenant Commander(A) T.R. Koeller, RNVR, from 7 March 1945
- Lieutenant Commander(A) J. Mills, RNVR, from 20 July 1945
- Lieutenant Commander M. Johnstone, DSC, RN, from 11 June 1948
- Lieutenant A.L. Brown, RN, from 3 February 1949
- disbanded - 8 December 1949

Note: Abbreviation (A) signifies Air Branch of the RN or RNVR.
