= 861 Naval Air Squadron =

Netherlands Naval Aviation Service squadron

- Active: 16 September 1946 – April 1947
- Country: Netherlands
- Branch: Netherlands Navy
- Type: Naval Air Squadron
- Role: Fighter pilot training
- Part of: Netherlands Naval Aviation Service

Insignia
- Identification Markings: 6-5 to 6-12 (Firefly)

Aircraft flown
- Fighter: Fairey Firefly

861 Naval Air Squadron (861 NAS) was a Naval Air Squadron of the Royal Netherlands Navy's Netherlands Naval Aviation Service, attached to the Royal Navy's Fleet Air Arm for a period of work-up.

== Service history ==
861 Naval Air Squadron was established at RNAS Dale (HMS Goldcrest) in Pembrokeshire, Wales, on 16 September 1946, serving as a squadron of the Royal Netherlands Navy temporarily integrated with the Royal Navy for preparatory operations, under the command of Luitenant G.H. Greve, RNIN.

Initially equipped with four Fairey Firefly I fighter aircraft, the squadron spent the next five months working up at RNAS Dale before embarking in the Royal Netherlands Navy’s first aircraft carrier, HNLMS Karel Doorman (QH1), on 22 February 1947.

The squadron relocated to Valkenburg Naval Air Base, near Leiden, Netherlands, in early April 1947, but was disbanded soon afterwards, where it was rebranded as Opleiding Gevechts Vliegers (OGV) to facilitate the training of pilots and observers to meet operational standards.

== Aircraft flown ==
860 Naval Air Squadron flew only one aircraft type:

- Fairey Firefly I fighter aircraft (September 1946 - April 1947)

== Naval air stations ==
861 Naval Air Squadron operated from a couple of naval air stations of the Royal Navy in the United Kingdom, one Royal Netherlands Navy airbase in the Netherlands, and a Royal Netherlands Navy aircraft carrier:

- Royal Naval Air Station Dale (HMS Goldcrest), Pembrokeshire, (16 September 1946 - 22 February 1947)
- HNLMS Karel Doorman (QH1) (22 February - March 1947)
- Royal Naval Air Station Fearn (HMS Owl), Scottish Highlands, (March - April 1947)
- Valkenburg Naval Air Base, Katwijk, Netherlands, (April 1947)
- disbanded - (April 1947)

== Commanding officers ==
List of commanding officers of 861 Naval Air Squadron with date of appointment:

- Luitenant ter Zee G.H. Greve, RNIN, from 16 September 1946
- Luitenant ter Zee G.J. Zegers de Beij, DSC, RNIN, from 12 December 1946
- disbanded - April 1947

== See also ==
- List of Fleet Air Arm aircraft squadrons

== Sources ==
- Ballance, Theo; Howard, Lee; Sturtivant, Ray (2016). The Squadrons and Units of the Fleet Air Arm. Air Britain Historians Limited. ISBN 978-0-85130-489-2.
