= No. 53 Squadron RAF =

Defunct flying squadron of the Royal Air Force

- Active: 15 May 1916 – 25 October 1919; 28 June 1937 – 15 June 1946; 1 November 1946 – 28 June 1963; 1 Nov 1965 – 14 September 1976
- Country: United Kingdom
- Branch: Royal Air Force
- Motto: United in effort
- Battle honours: Western Front, 1916–18*: Messines, 1917*: Ypres, 1917*: France & Low Countries, 1939–40: Dunkirk*: Invasion Ports, 1940: Channel & North Sea, 1940–44: Fortress Europe, 1940–41*: Biscay Ports, 1941–42*: Biscay 1941–44:Atlantic 1941–45*: Normandy 1944*:Honours marked with an asterisk are those emblazoned on the Squadron Standard

Insignia
- Squadron badge heraldry: In front of a saltire, a thistle slipped and leaved.
- Squadron codes: TE Jan 1939 – Sep 1939; PZ Sep 1939 – Feb 1943; FH Jun 1944 – Feb 1946; PU Dec 1946 – Jul 1949 (Codes taken over from No 187 Sqn)

No. 53 Squadron was a Royal Air Force squadron that saw service in both the First and Second World Wars.

== History ==
No. 53 Squadron of the Royal Flying Corps was formed at Catterick on 15 May 1916. Originally intended to be a training squadron, it was sent to France to operate reconnaissance in December that year. The squadron was equipped with the B.E.2e—swapped for the R.E.8 in April 1917. It returned the UK in March 1919 to Old Sarum where it was disbanded on 25 October 1919.

The squadron reformed on 28 June 1937 at RAF Farnborough with the Hawker Hector for Army Cooperation; specialising in night reconnaissance. The squadron was given the Bristol Blenheim light bomber in January 1939 and moved to France in September. Following the German attack on France in May 1940, the squadron returned to the UK. From here it undertook bombing and reconnaissance missions.

In 1940 it was transferred from RAF Fighter Command to RAF Coastal Command, thereafter alternating between No. 16 Group RAF and No. 19 Group RAF. It moved to RAF St Eval, Cornwall, for anti-submarine and anti-shipping operations. In July 1941 the Blenheims were replaced by the Lockheed Hudson. In July 1942 the squadron was transferred to the Eastern Seaboard of the USA, from there it moved to Trinidad. It returned to Cornwall, RAF Davidstow Moor and was given Armstrong Whitworth Whitleys in early 1943. It moved on to stations in Norfolk but by May was operating the Consolidated Liberators at RAF Thorney Island, Hampshire.

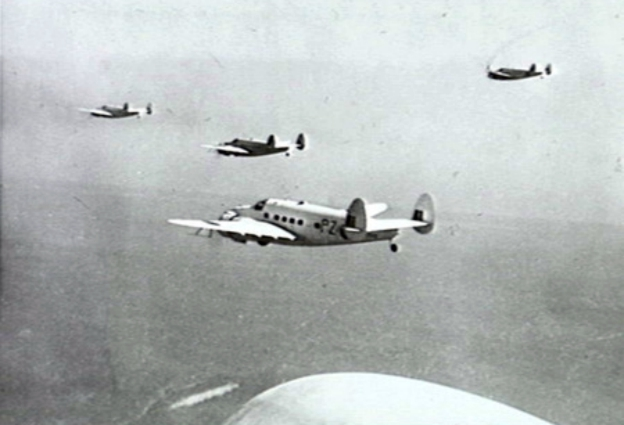
53 Squadron Lockheed Hudsons in 1942.

In September 1944 it was transferred to Iceland where it stayed until the end of the war in Europe. It came back to the UK to RAF St Davids, joining RAF Transport Command to carry troops to India. The squadron was disbanded at RAF Gransden Lodge on 15 June 1946.

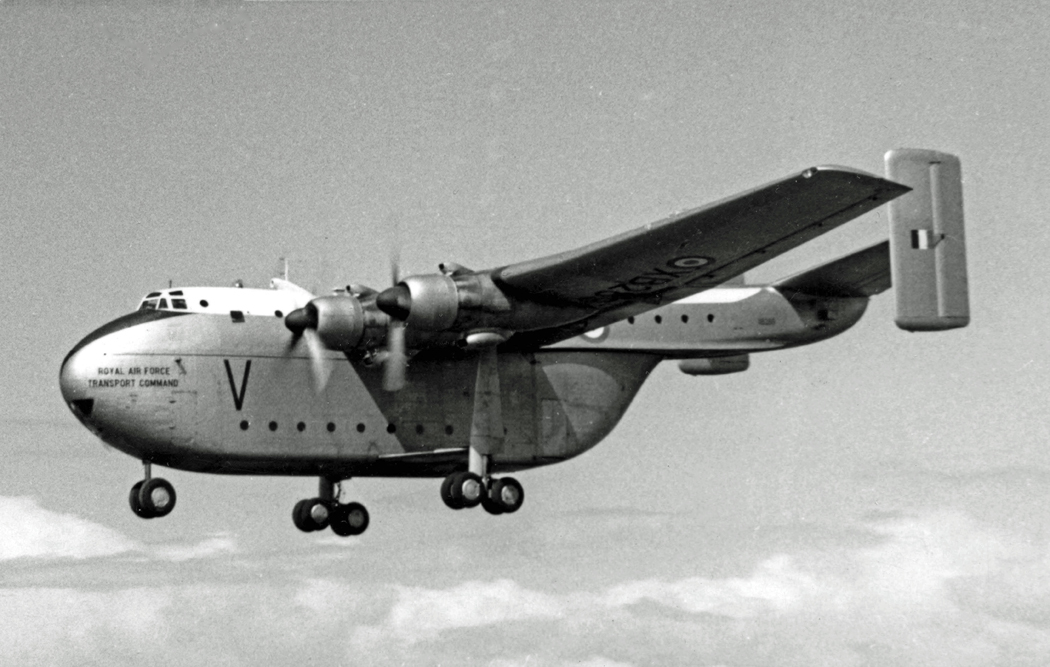
A 53 Squadron Blackburn Beverley in 1957

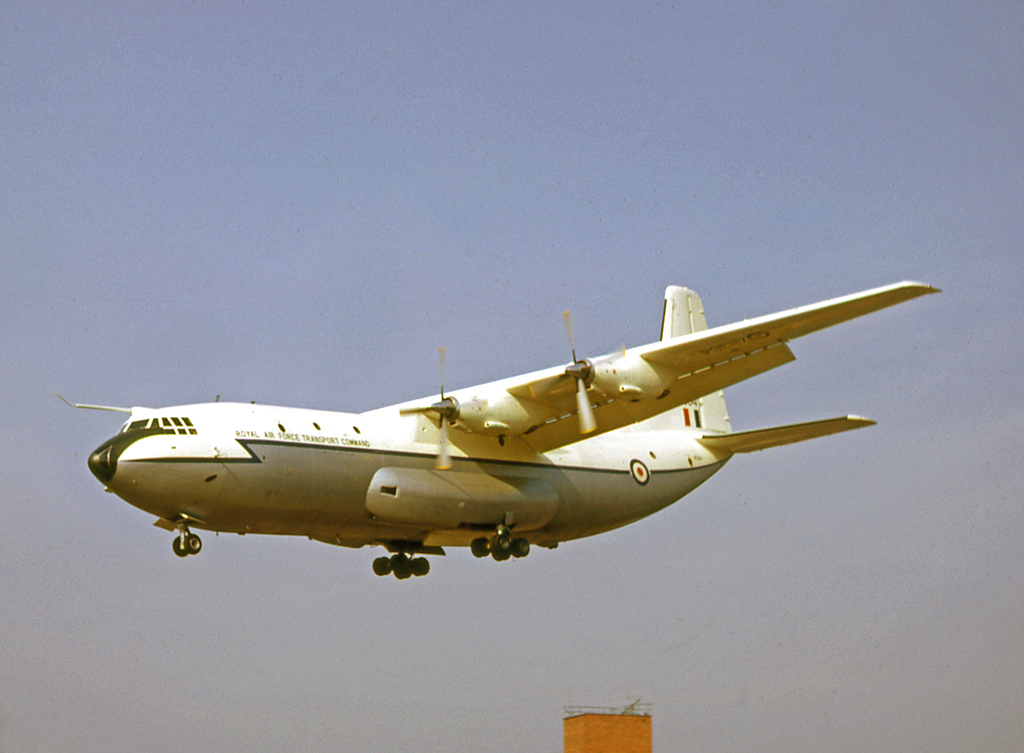
Short Belfast heavy transport operated by 53 Squadron 1966-1976

It was reformed on 1 November 1946 with Douglas Dakotas which it used throughout the Berlin Airlift and was then disbanded again on 31 July 1949.

The squadron reformed the next day at RAF Topcliffe with Handley Page Hastings transports. Blackburn Beverleys replaced the Hastings in 1957. It was disbanded at Abingdon on 28 June 1963.

On 1 November 1965 at RAF Fairford it reformed as the RAF's first and only squadron with the Short Belfast. It moved to RAF Brize Norton in 1967, and remained there until disbanding on 14 September 1976.

== See also ==
- List of Royal Air Force aircraft squadrons
- 1957 Sutton Wick Beverley accident
