= Netherlands Naval Aviation Service =

Aviation arm of the Royal Netherlands Navy

Naval Aviation Service
- Marineluchtvaartdienst
- Founded: 1914
- Country: Netherlands
- Type: Naval aviation
- Part of: Royal Netherlands Navy
- Engagements: First World War; Second World War

Insignia
- Roundel

The Netherlands Naval Aviation Service (Dutch: Marineluchtvaartdienst, shortened to MLD) is the naval aviation branch of the Royal Netherlands Navy.

== History ==
=== World War I ===
Although the MLD was formed in 1914, with the building of a seaplane base at De Mok, Texel, it developed slowly during the inter-war years due to limited budget. After the graduation of the first pilot group in 1915, on August 18, 1917, the MLD was founded under official decree and De Mok became the main base. At this time, the emphasis was on seaplane operations in the Dutch East Indies where Dornier Wal aircraft enabled patrols of the large archipelago in 1926. The perceived threat from Nazi Germany in the 1930s accelerated the development of air capability and the purchase of new equipment.

=== World War II ===
The German invasion of the Netherlands on May 10, 1940, rapidly overwhelmed Dutch resistance and the MLD aircraft were redeployed to France before the Dutch formally surrendered on 15 May. Shortly after, the MLD was ordered to Britain, where Dutch personnel formed No. 320 Squadron RAF, Coastal Command, in June 1940. A second squadron, 321 Squadron, was also formed, but later merged with 320 Squadron. Other MLD personnel served on MAC ships in the Fleet Air Arm's 860 and 861 Naval Air Squadrons, flying the Fairey Swordfish.

At this time efforts were made to strengthen the MLD in the Dutch East Indies. When the war with Japan started in December 1941, the MLD numbered 130 aircraft. The main types were 37 Dornier Do 24 K-1 and 36 Consolidated PBY-5 Catalina flying boats. The major base was at Morokrembangan Naval Air Base near Soerabaja in eastern Java. The MLD had secondary bases as well as seaplane tenders that enabled it to spread out and cover the entire Netherlands East Indies. It was organized into 18 squadrons (GVT, Groep Vliegtuigen) of about three aircraft each to provide reconnaissance, anti-submarine patrols, convoy escort in support of Dutch forces. The MLD did not have radar. The MLD fought about 95 combat actions, sank one Japanese ship (the destroyer Shinonome), damaged some others, shot down a few Japanese aircraft and inflicted some casualties on Japanese personnel on the ground. That was not enough to stop the Japanese, and eventually the MLD was forced to evacuate to Ceylon and Australia. They lost 95% of their aircraft and 50% of their personnel.

On March 3, 1942, nine MLD Dornier and Catalina flying boats were destroyed in the Japanese air attack on Broome, in Australia. About 58 MLD personnel were killed, wounded, or missing. Later that year, on July 1 in Ceylon, 321 Squadron was re-formed under the command of Willem van Prooijen, with MLD Catalinas. The PBYs in Australia were transferred to Ceylon, and the surviving Dorniers were sold to the Australian government. The flight school was relocated to the United States.

The Royal Netherlands Military Flying School (see nl:Royal Netherlands Military Flying School) was established in the United States, at Jackson Field (also known as Hawkins Field), Jackson, Mississippi, operating lend-lease aircraft, training all military aircrew for the Netherlands. The intention was to return to the Netherlands and to participate in the war against Japan. After liberation, the main MLD base was established at Valkenburg, with De Kooy as the overhaul and repair base.

=== Post-war ===
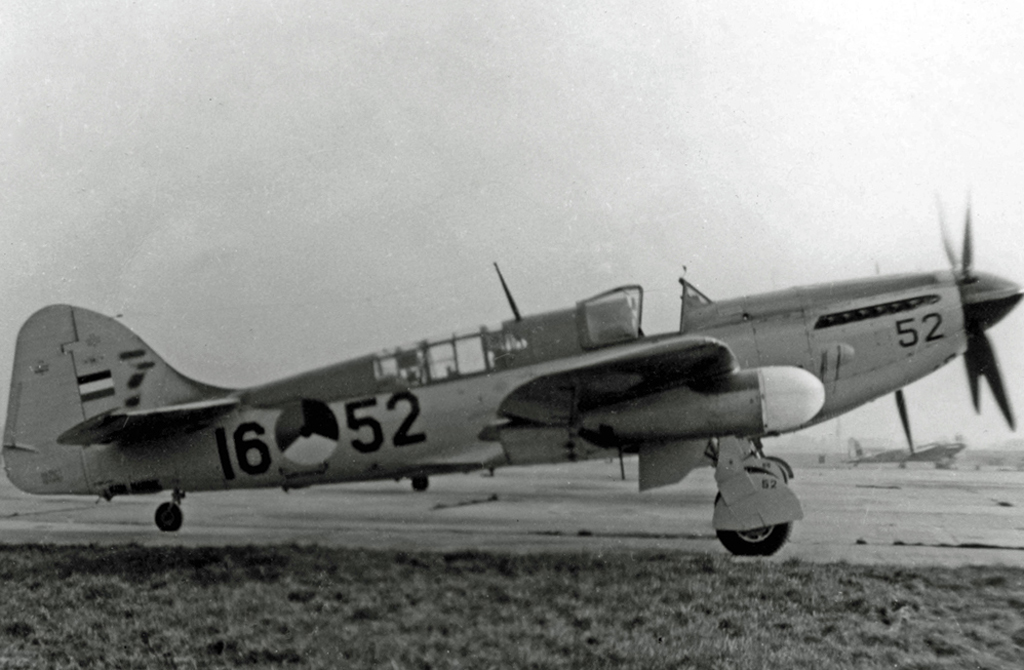
Fairey Firefly FR.4 of the MLD in 1952

The British escort carrier HMS Nairana was obtained on a two-year loan from the Royal Navy and renamed HNLMS Karel Doorman. In March 1948 a light fleet carrier, HMS Venerable, was purchased from the Royal Navy to replace the loaned one, and also renamed HNLMS Karel Doorman. Aircraft carried aboard included the fighter-reconnaissance and anti-submarine Fairey Firefly.

The main roles of the MLD were maritime patrol, anti-submarine warfare and search and rescue. From 1953, with the creation of NATO, the MLD received substantial aid from the US, including 12 Lockheed PV-2 Harpoon, Lockheed P2V Neptune, Grumman TBF Avenger and 43 Grumman S-2 Tracker (1955–1974) aircraft.

320 and 321 Squadrons were stationed at NAS Valkenburg and was known as the group aircraft. Helicopters were stationed at De Kooy and on ships and were known as the group helicopters. 860 Squadron remained in service to operate the remaining NH90 helicopters, but as part of the Defence Helicopter Command.

In the late 1960s, the aircraft carrier was replaced in the anti-submarine role by a squadron of Westland Wasp helicopters operated from anti-submarine frigates. These helicopters were replaced by Westland Lynxs, and these were replaced themselves by NH90 helicopters.

320 and 321 Squadrons operated 19 Neptunes (1961–1982) and 9 Breguet Atlantic (1969–1984), which were later replaced by 13 Lockheed P-3 Orion CUP (1982–2005). In the 1980s a Lockheed P-3C-II.5 Orion of the MLD was stationed at Naval Air Station Keflavik.

In 2003, it was announced that NAS Valkenburg would close in 2006. All the Orions were sold to the German Navy (8) and Portuguese Air Force (5). Naval squadrons 320 and 321 were disbanded.

In 2008, the navy helicopters (Westland Lynx) and crews of naval squadrons 7 and 860 based at NAS de Kooy were transferred to the Defence Helicopter Command (DHC) as were the Royal Netherlands Air Force helicopters. All Dutch military helicopters are now under one single command which is neither navy nor air force. No. 7 Squadron is to become a small training squadron, while 860 Squadron will become much larger and is designated DHC's maritime squadron with a large navy component. NAS de Kooy was renamed Maritime Airstation de Kooy.

== Historical aircraft 1945–1990 ==
Fixed-wing aircraft
Aircraft type	Origin	Number	In service	Notes
Fighter aircraft
Hawker Sea Fury	United Kingdom	48	1946–1956	
Hawker Sea Hawk	United Kingdom	22	1956–1964	Operated from the aircraft carrier HNLMS Karel Doorman (R81)
Maritime patrol aircraft
Fairey Firefly	United Kingdom	84	1946–1961	Operated from the aircraft carrier HNLMS Karel Doorman (R81). MLD had 30 Mk 1's in service between 1946–1954, 40 Mk 4's between 1947–1961 and 14 Mk 5's between 1954–1961.
North American B-25 Mitchell	United States	9	1947–1952	
Lockheed PV-2 Harpoon	United States	18	1951–1954	
Grumman TBF Avenger	United States	78	1954–1960	
Lockheed P-2 Neptune	United States	31	1954–1983	Operated 12 P2V-5 between 1954–1961 and 19 P2V-7 between 1961–1983.
Grumman S-2 Tracker	United States	43	1960–1974	Operated from the aircraft carrier HNLMS Karel Doorman (R81)
Bréguet Atlantic SP-13A	France	9	1969–1984	
Lockheed P-3 Orion	United States	13	1983–2004	
Amphibious aircraft
Catalina PBY-5A	United States	22	1946–1957	
Supermarine Sea Otter Mk 2	United Kingdom	8	1949–1954	Operated from the aircraft carrier HNLMS Karel Doorman (R81).
Martin PBM-5A Mariner	United States	15	1955–1959	
Military transport aircraft
Douglas Dakota C-47	United States	15	1945–1961	

Helicopters
Aircraft type	Origin	Number	In service	Notes
Sikorsky S-51	United States	1	1951–1959	
Sikorsky S-55	United States	3	1954–1963	
Sikorsky S-58	United States	12	1959–1972	
Agusta Bell UH-I	United States; Italy	8	1962–1977	
Westland Wasp AH-12A	United Kingdom	12	1967–1983	Operated from six Van Speijk class frigates.
Westland Lynx	United Kingdom	24	1977–2013	Operated from the Van Speijk-class frigates. Later from the Tromp and Kortenaer class frigates.

== Historical weapons ==
- AIM-9 Sidewinder air-to-air missiles – The Sidewinders were carried by the Hawker Sea Hawk.
