= No. 304 Polish Bomber Squadron =

No. 304 (Land of Silesia) Polish Bomber Squadron
- 304 Squadron logo
- Active: 22 August 1940 – 18 December 1946
- Country: United Kingdom
- Allegiance: (Poland) Polish government in exile
- Branch: Royal Air Force
- Role: Bomber Squadron; Anti-Submarine Squadron; Transport Squadron
- Part of: RAF Bomber Command; RAF Coastal Command; RAF Transport Command
- Nickname(s): Silesian "Ziemi Śląskiej im. Ks. Józefa Poniatowskiego" (Land of Silesia, bearing the name of Prince Józef Poniatowski)

Insignia
- Squadron codes: NZ (August 1940 – May 1942); 2 (August 1943 – July 1944); QD (July 1944 – December 1946)

Aircraft flown
- Bomber: Fairey Battle (training); Vickers Wellington
- Transport: Vickers Warwick; Handley Page Halifax

No. 304 (Land of Silesia) Polish Bomber Squadron (Polish: 304 Dywizjon Bombowy "Ziemi Śląskiej im. Ks. Józefa Poniatowskiego") was a Polish bomber squadron formed in Great Britain as part of an agreement between the Polish Government in Exile and the United Kingdom in 1940. It was one of 15 squadrons of the Polish Air Force in exile that served alongside the Royal Air Force in World War II. It operated under RAF operational command, and flew from airbases in the United Kingdom. It served from April 1941 as a bomber unit in RAF Bomber Command; from May 1942 as an anti-submarine unit in RAF Coastal Command; and from June 1945 as a transport unit in RAF Transport Command.

== History ==
=== Bomber Command ===
304 Squadron was created on 23 August 1940 at RAF Bramcote, and from 1 December 1940 it operated from RAF Syerston, as a part of No. 1 Bomber Group (along with No. 305 Squadron created at the same time). It was declared ready for operations with Vickers Wellington Mk I medium bombers on 24 April 1941. The personnel included 24 entirely Polish air crews (initially three-men, later six-men) and approximately 180 ground crew. On the night of 24–25 April 1941 two crews flew the squadron's first combat mission against fuel tanks in Rotterdam. In the following months the squadron joined the night bombing campaign over Germany and France. First losses occurred on 6 May and 8 May 1941 (in the second instance, a crew of the British advisor W/Cdr W. Graham). On 20 July 1941 the squadron moved to RAF Lindholme base. In 1941 the squadron completed 214 missions lasting 1,202 hours, losing 47 killed airmen.

In first four months of 1942 the intensity of operations increased. Due to large losses suffered in early 1942, including six crews lost in April, and difficulties in recruiting replacements, it was decided to transfer the squadron to RAF Coastal Command. While in Bomber Command the squadron completed 488 missions in 2,481 hours, dropping some 800 tons of bombs, losing 102 airmen killed or missing in action, and 35 as prisoners of war.

=== Coastal Command ===
On 10 May 1942 the squadron was transferred to RAF Coastal Command along with the Wellington aircraft. From 14 May 1942 it based at RAF Tiree, from 13 June 1942 at RAF Dale. Apart from patrolling duties over the Bay of Biscay, seven crews took part in a thousand-aircraft raid at Bremen on 25/26 June 1942 (losing one crew). Several times Polish crews attacked U-boats and fought with German long-range aircraft. On 13 August 1942 the Squadron was credited with sinking a U-boat, though this was not confirmed post-war. On 2 September 1942 one Wellington inflicted damage to Italian Reginaldo Giuliani submarine. A noteworthy event was a skirmish of one Wellington with six German Junkers Ju 88s on 16 September 1942 over the Bay of Biscay; The Polish aircraft was badly shot, but managed to hide in clouds, and claimed one Ju 88 shot down. On 9 February 1943 one Wellington evaded attacks by four Ju 88 for nearly an hour until they ran out of ammunition, and escaped with two Polish crewmen injured; similar combat with four Ju 88 took place on 5 September 1943, without losses, in spite of 116 bullet holes found.

From 30 March 1943 the squadron based at RAF Docking, from 10 June 1943 at RAF Davidstow Moor (equipped with radar-fitted Wellington Mk XIII), from 20 December 1943 at RAF Predannack, from 19 March 1944 at RAF Chivenor. On 4 January 1944 a Wellington strafed and damaged U-629. On 18 June 1944 the squadron was credited with sinking a U-boat, but its identity is unknown. It was quoted to be U-441, but it has been negated afterwards, and possible victims remain U-988 or U-1191. From 19 September 1944 it was based at RAF Benbecula, from 5 March 1945 at RAF St Eval. On 2 April 1945 one Wellington sank U-321 with depth charges.

In Coastal Command the squadron undertook 2,451 missions in 21,331 hours, losing 19 aircraft and 69 men killed in action; six missing in action; and 31 killed in non-combat flights. It claimed 31 submarine attacked and was credited with two U-boats sunk and five damaged, it also claimed three aircraft shot down, three probable and four damaged.

Its last mission was on 30 May 1945, looking out for possible German submarines that may not have surrendered.

=== Transport Command ===
After the end of the war in Europe, on 14 June 1945 the squadron was transferred to Transport Command, and operated scheduled services with Warwick C.3s to Greece and Italy. From April 1946 onwards the Polish squadrons were restricted to flights within the UK. In May the squadron converted to Halifax Mk C.8 unarmed transports and was disbanded a few months later on 18 December 1946.

== Aircraft operated ==
Aircraft operated by 304 Squadron
From	To	Aircraft	Version
23 August 1940		Fairey Battle	Mk I
1 December 1940		Vickers Wellington	Mk IA, Mk IC
10 April 1943		Vickers Wellington	Mk X
10 June 1943		Vickers Wellington	Mk XIII
14 September 1943		Vickers Wellington	Mk XIV
5 August 1945		Vickers Warwick	C Mk I, Mk III
1 January 1946		Handley Page Halifax	C Mk VIII

== Squadron bases ==
The squadron operated from the following airfields:

From	To	Base
23 August 1940		RAF Bramcote, Warwickshire
1 December 1940		RAF Syerston, Nottinghamshire
20 July 1941		RAF Lindholme, South Yorkshire
14 May 1942		RAF Tiree, Inner Hebrides
13 June 1942		RAF Dale, Wales
30 March 1943		RAF Docking, Norfolk
10 June 1943		RAF Davidstow Moor, Cornwall
20 December 1943		RAF Predannack, Cornwall
19 March 1944		RAF Chivenor, Devon
19 September 1944		RAF Benbecula, Outer Hebrides
5 March 1945		RAF St Eval, Cornwall
June 1945		RAF North Weald, Essex
September 1945		RAF Chedburgh, Suffolk

== Commanding officers ==
Officers commanding No. 304 Squadron were as follows:

From	To	Name
23 August 1940	22 December 1940	Ppłk. pilot Jan Biały (RAF advisor s/ldr w. Graham until 8 May 1941, killed in action)
23 December 1940	13 November 1941	Ppłk. pilot Piotr Dudziński
14 November 1941	15 August 1942	Mjr nawigator Stanisław Poziomek
16 August 1942	28 January 1943	Mjr pilot Kazimierz Czetowicz
29 January 1943	18 November 1943	Kpt. pilot Mieczysław Pronaszko
19 November 1943	10 April 1944	Kpt. nawigator Czesław Korbut
11 April 1944	2 January 1945	Mjr. pilot Jerzy Kranc
3 January 1945		Kpt. pilot (w/cdr) Stanisław Żurek OBE

- Ppłk. – podpułkownik – equivalent to wing commander
- Mjr. – major – equivalent to squadron leader
- Kpt. – kapitan – equivalent to flight lieutenant

== See also ==
- List of Royal Air Force aircraft squadrons
- Polish Air Forces in France and Great Britain
- Military history of Poland during World War II
