= No. 19 Group RAF =

Former Royal Air Force operations group

No. 19 (General Reconnaissance) Group RAF ~~No. 19 (Equipment) Group RAF~~
- Royal Air Force Ensign
- Active: April–June 1918; 5 February 1941 – 28 November 1969
- Country: United Kingdom
- Branch: Royal Air Force
- Type: Royal Air Force group
- Role: Maritime Reconnaissance (1941–1969)
- Part of: RAF Coastal Command
- Engagements: First World War; Second World War: European theatre of World War II

No. 19 Group was a group of the Royal Air Force, active during 1918, and then from 1941–1969.

== History ==
=== First World War ===
During the First World War, No. 19 (Equipment) Group was formed in York, at the start of April 1918, in No. 4 Area, it was transferred to North-Eastern Area on 8 May 1918 and disbanded in June.

=== Second World War ===
The group was reformed in February 1941 as No. 19 (General Reconnaissance) Group, in RAF Coastal Command, at Mount Wise, Plymouth. By May 1941 the group was flying from three Royal Air Force stations, with seven units.

May 1941

- No. 19 (Reconnaissance) Group RAF, Air Officer Commanding: Air Commodore G. H. Boyce
  - Group Headquarters: Mount Wise located in Plymouth
    - RAF Carew Cheriton
      - No. 236 Squadron RAF operated with Bristol Blenheim light bomber
      - Coastal Command Development Unit RAF operated with Bristol Beaufighter multirole aircraft and Lockheed Hudson light bomber and coastal reconnaissance aircraft
    - RAF Roborough
      - No. 19 Group Communication Flight RAF operated with various aircraft
    - RAF St Eval
      - No. 217 Squadron RAF operated with Bristol Beaufort
      - No. 53 Squadron RAF operated with Bristol Blenheim
      - No. 1404 (Meteorological) Flight RAF operated with Bristol Blenheim
      - Photographic Reconnaissance Unit RAF 'B' Flight operated with Supermarine Spitfire and Bristol Blenheim

Its units in February 1942 included:

No. 19 Group RAF (GR), under command of Air Commodore G. R. Bromet, CBE, DSO

Squadron	Aircraft	Station
No. 22 Squadron RAF	Bristol Beaufort	RAF St Eval
No. 86 Squadron RAF	Bristol Beaufort	RAF St Eval
No. 209 Squadron RAF	Consolidated Catalina	RAF Pembroke Dock
No. 217 Squadron RAF	Bristol Beaufort	RAF St Eval
No. 224 Squadron RAF	Lockheed Hudson	RAF St Eval
No. 254 Squadron RAF	Bristol Blenheim	RAF Carew Cheriton
No. 502 (Ulster) Squadron RAF	Armstrong Whitworth Whitley	RAF St Eval
No. 10 Squadron RAAF	Short Sunderland	RAF Mount Batten
No. 1404 (Meteorological) Flight RAF	Lockheed Hudson	RAF St Eval
No. 1417 (Leigh Light Trials) Flight RAF	Vickers Wellington	RAF Chivenor
No. 1 Photographic Reconnaissance Unit RAF	Bristol Blenheim	RAF St Eval (B Flight)

Among its squadrons during the war was No. 461 Squadron RAAF.

=== Cold War ===
No. 19 Group assets during October 1946:

- No. 19 (Reconnaissance) Group RAF, Air Officer Commanding: Air Vice-Marshal C. B. S. Spackman
  - Group Headquarters: Mount Wise located in Plymouth
    - RAF St Eval
      - No. 210 Squadron RAF with Avro Lancaster GR.3 heavy bomber modified for maritime reconnaissance
      - No. 224 Squadron RAF with Avro Lancaster GR.3 heavy bomber modified for maritime reconnaissance
    - RAF Calshot
      - No. 201 Squadron RAF with Short Sunderland GR.5 flying boat patrol bomber
      - No. 230 Squadron RAF with Short Sunderland GR.5 flying boat patrol bomber
    - RAF Thorney Island
      - No. 36 Squadron RAF with de Havilland Mosquito FB.6 multirole combat aircraft
      - No. 42 Squadron RAF with Bristol Beaufighter TF.10 multi-role aircraft

The group relocated to RAF Mount Batten in 1947.

In 1953, NATO documents instructing Admiral George Creasy, the new Commander-in-Chief, Eastern Atlantic Area (CINCEASTLANT), wrote that Air Vice Marshal Thomas Traill, CB, OBE, DFC, Royal Air Force, Air Officer Commanding No. 19 Group RAF, had been appointed as Air Commander North-East Atlantic Sub-Area.

No. 19 Group order of battle (OOB) in July 1954:

- No. 19 (Reconnaissance) Group RAF, Air Officer Commanding: Air Vice-Marshal T. C. Traill CB, OBE, DFC
  - Group Headquarters: RAF Mount Batten located in Plymouth Sound, Devon
    - RAF St Eval
      - No. 42 Squadron RAF with Avro Shackleton MR.1 & MR.2 maritime patrol aircraft
      - No. 206 Squadron RAF with Avro Shackleton MR.1 & MR.2 maritime patrol aircraft
      - No. 220 Squadron RAF with Avro Shackleton MR.1 & MR.2 maritime patrol aircraft
      - No. 228 Squadron RAF with Avro Shackleton MR.1 & MR.2 maritime patrol aircraft
    - RAF Pembroke Dock
      - No. 201 Squadron RAF with Short Sunderland GR.5 flying boat patrol bomber
      - No. 230 Squadron RAF with Short Sunderland GR.5 flying boat patrol bomber
    - RAF Topcliffe
      - No. 36 Squadron RAF with Lockheed Neptune MR.1 maritime patrol and anti-submarine warfare aircraft
      - No. 203 Squadron RAF with Lockheed Neptune MR.1 maritime patrol and anti-submarine warfare aircraft
      - No. 210 Squadron RAF with Lockheed Neptune MR.1 maritime patrol and anti-submarine warfare aircraft

19 Group OOB during April 1962:

- No. 19 (Reconnaissance) Group RAF, Air Officer Commanding: Air Vice-Marshal S. W. R. Hughes
  - Group Headquarters: RAF Mount Batten located in Plymouth Sound, Devon
    - RAF St Mawgan
      - No. 22 Squadron RAF with Westland Whirlwind
      - No. 42 Squadron RAF with Avro Shackleton
      - No. 201 Squadron RAF with Avro Shackleton
      - No. 206 Squadron RAF with Avro Shackleton

Before it became HQ Southern Maritime Air Region in November 1969, its last commander appears to have been Air Vice-Marshal Cresswell Clementi.

== Air Officer Commanding No. 19 Group RAF ==
Air Officers Commanding of No. 19 Group:

- 1941–1942: Air Commodore G. H. Boyce
- 1942–1943: Air Vice-Marshal Geoffrey Bromet
- 1943–1944: Air Vice-Marshal Brian Baker
- 1944–1945: Air Vice-Marshal F. H. Maynard
- 1945–1947: Air Vice-Marshal C. B. S. Spackman
- 1947–1950: Air Vice-Marshal Frank Hopps
- 1950–1952: Air Vice-Marshal Geoffrey Spencer
- 1952–1954: Air Vice-Marshal T. C. Traill
- 1954–1956: Air Vice-Marshal Geoffrey Tuttle
- 1956–1959: Air Vice-Marshal G. I. L. Save
- 1959–1962: Air Vice-Marshal L. W. C. Bower
- 1962–1964: Air Vice-Marshal Rochford Hughes
- 1964–1967: Air Vice-Marshal John Barraclough
- 1967–1968: Air Vice-Marshal J. H. Lapsley
- 1968–1969: Air Vice-Marshal Cresswell Clementi
