= Jindřich Svoboda =

Jindřich Svoboda may refer to:

- Jindřich Svoboda (footballer) (born 1952), Czech footballer
- Jindřich Svoboda (aviator) (1917–1942), Czech aviator
