= 1942 Ruislip Wellington accident =

Aviation incident in England

Coordinates: 51°33′23″N 0°24′14″W

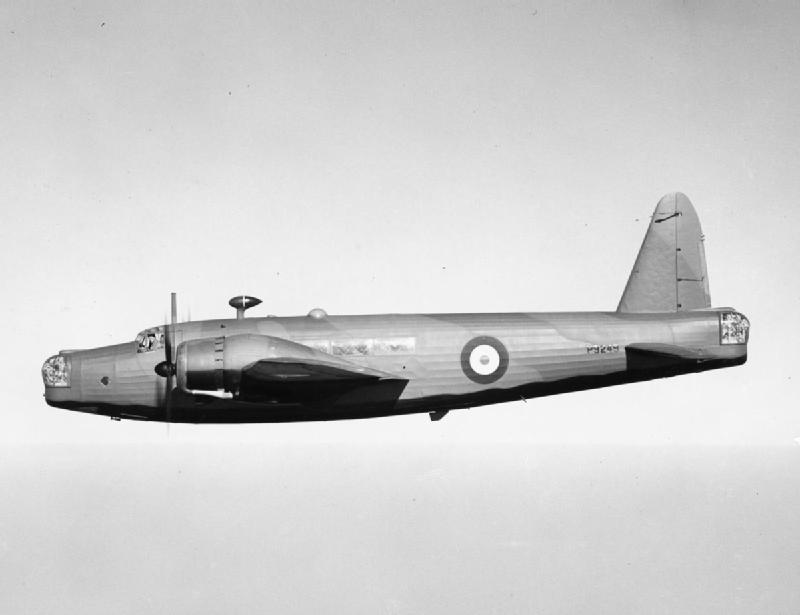
- A Vickers Wellington IC in flight

Accident
- Date: 18 October 1942
- Summary: Stall due to pilot error.
- Site: Ruislip, London, England
- Total fatalities: 21

Aircraft
- Aircraft type: Vickers Wellington 1C
- Operator: No. 311 Squadron RAF
- Registration: T2564 (KX-T)
- Flight origin: RAF Talbenny, Wales
- Destination: RAF Northolt, England
- Passengers: 9
- Crew: 6
- Fatalities: 15
- Survivors: 0

Ground casualties
- Ground fatalities: 6

The 1942 Ruislip Wellington accident occurred on 18 October 1942 when a Vickers Wellington 1C medium bomber of No. 311 Squadron RAF crashed near South Ruislip station, Middlesex, on approach to RAF Northolt. The crash killed all 15 people aboard the aircraft, and six civilians on the ground including four children.

== Background ==
311 Squadron was a Coastal Command unit based at RAF Talbenny in Pembrokeshire, Wales. All of its personnel were serving in the RAF Volunteer Reserve, and all but one of those on the aircraft that crashed were Free Czechoslovaks. In September 1942 two Wellingtons from the squadron had each successfully attacked German U-boats. In October both crews were invited to London for a de-brief.

On 9 September a Wellington with serial number DV738 and code letters KX-C, flown by Plt Off František Bulis, had depth charged an unidentified U-boat, forcing it to dive. Large patches of oil appeared on the sea surface after she dived, suggesting that the U-boat had at least been damaged. On 27 September a Wellington with the serial number Z1147 and code letters KX-Q, flown by Flt Lt Václav Študent, depth charged U-165. The U-boat returned fire with her 20 mm FlaK 30 machine guns, wounding four crew members including the co-pilot. KX-C's hydraulic equipment was damaged, and Študent crash-landed the plane at St Eval, Cornwall. However, the attack succeeded in sinking U-165.

== Flight ==
On 18 October 1942 the two crews took off from Talbenny in a single Wellington headed for Northolt. Plt Off Bulis and his crew flew the aircraft, and Flt Lt Študent's crew flew as passengers. Two of Študent's crew were unable to come as they were still in hospital after being wounded on 27 September. 18 October is Czechoslovak independence day, so a few other members of 311 Squadron came with them to enjoy the day in London. There was a total of nine passengers, including one Belgian, Plt Off Georges Strauss-Leemans, who was 311 Squadron's transport officer. The aircraft was a Wellington with serial number T2564 and code letters KX-T.

== Crash and fatalities ==
Wellington T2564 approached RAF Northolt from the west at about 1600 hrs at an altitude of 500–600 ft (150–180 m) and with its undercarriage lowered. Bulis turned the plane steeply to port to approach Northolt's east-west runway from the east. The Wellington stalled, then dived toward the ground near South Ruislip station.

At 16:08 hrs, a wing-tip clipped a main road, flipping the plane over onto a piece of waste ground where dozens of children were playing. The Wellington burst into flames. This detonated the ammunition of its .303 inch machine guns, which started firing in all directions.

All the crew and passengers were killed, making the crash 311 Squadron's largest loss of life in a single incident. Six civilians on the ground were also killed: two adult sisters, each with two young daughters.

All but one of the crew are buried in the Czechoslovak section of Brookwood Military Cemetery in Surrey. The women and children are buried in St Nicholas' parish churchyard, Brockenhurst, Hampshire.

== Inquest ==
As well as a service inquiry an inquest was held at Uxbridge, Middlesex, into the deaths of the two sisters and their four children. The aircraft was deemed to have been serviceable and not overloaded. A witness at Northolt said it was flying quite normally: "It made a quarter circle, gradually losing height. Then it appeared to lose height rather more quickly and disappeared behind some houses". The Coroner recorded a verdict of accidental death.

== See also ==
- Elvetham air crash, in which a Consolidated Liberator of No. 311 Squadron RAF crashed in 1945 east of Hartley Wintney, Hampshire, killing all five crew and 18 passengers
