= Elvetham air crash =

1945 aviation incident in England

Coordinates: 51°18′3.40″N 0°53′6.97″W

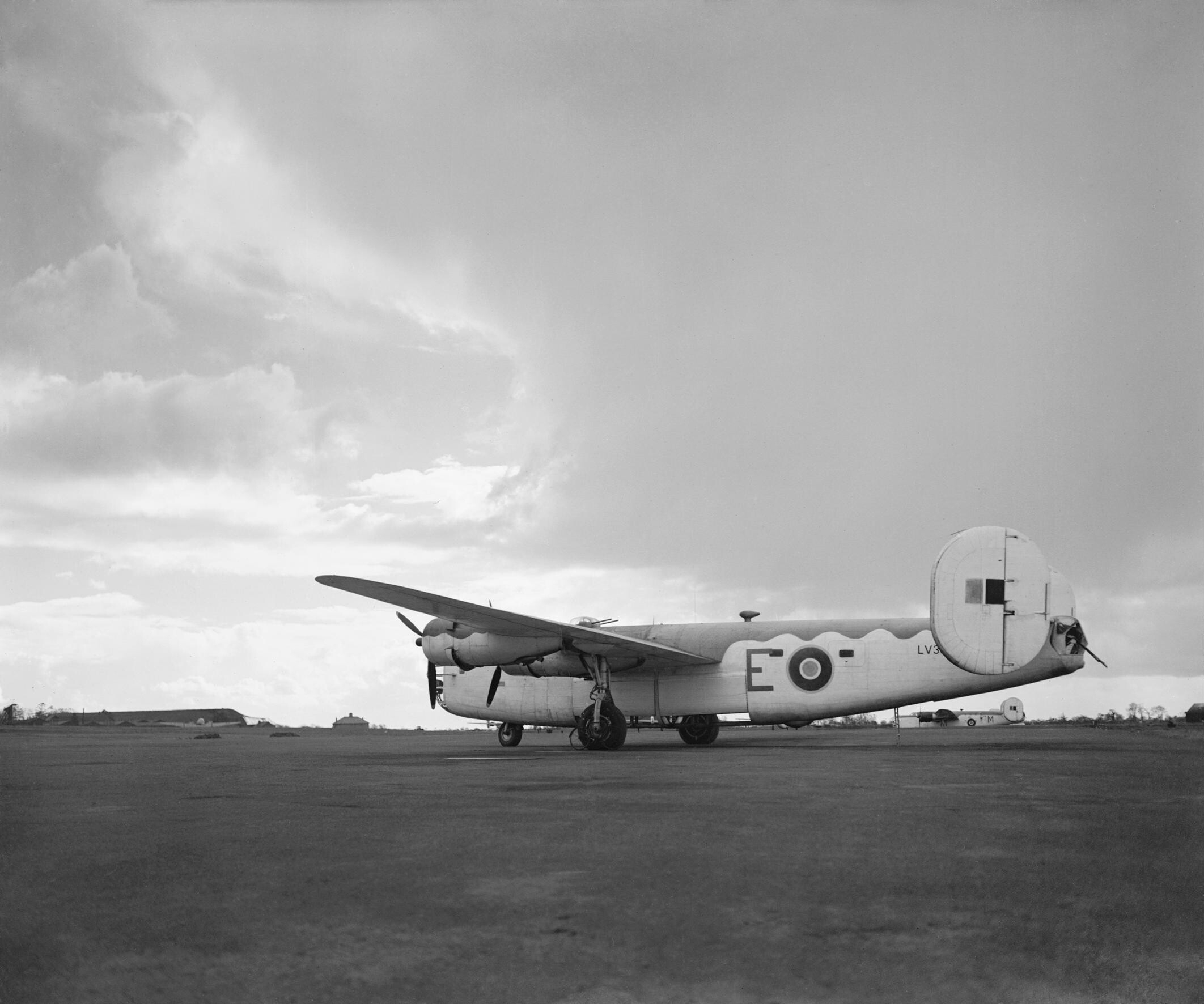
- A Consolidated Liberator GR.VI of No. 200 Squadron RAF. This is the same version of B-24 as KG867 PP-N of 311 Squadron.

Accident
- Date: 5 October 1945
- Summary: Fuel leak leading to engine fire
- Site: Elvetham, Hampshire, England

Aircraft
- Aircraft type: Consolidated Liberator GR.VI
- Operator: RAF Transport Command
- Registration: KG867
- Flight origin: RAF Blackbushe, Hampshire, England
- Destination: Ruzyně Airport, Prague, Czechoslovakia
- Passengers: 18
- Crew: 5
- Fatalities: 23
- Survivors: 0

The Elvetham air crash occurred on 5 October 1945 when a Consolidated Liberator GR.VI aircraft, serial number KG867, of 311 Squadron Royal Air Force crashed at Elvetham, east of Hartley Wintney, Hampshire, following a fire in one of its engines and fuel starvation to another.

The aircraft was about five minutes into a flight from nearby RAF Blackbushe to Ruzyně Airport, Prague, Czechoslovakia. The crash killed all 23 people aboard: five crew, 17 official passengers and one stowaway.

All 23 victims were Czechoslovak citizens. They included ten women and five very young children. The crash was the largest single loss of life in an accident involving Free Czechoslovaks serving in the RAF Volunteer Reserve. After the crash the Czechoslovak Government switched the repatriation of its nationals from air to surface transport.

== Aircraft ==
Consolidated Aircraft had designed and built the four-engined B-24 Liberator as a long-range maritime patrol aircraft and heavy bomber. The GR.VI was a maritime patrol version that 311 Squadron had flown under RAF Coastal Command since June 1943. The Allies' need for such patrols was reduced by the surrender of Germany in May 1945 and ended by the surrender of Japan in August.

However, the need for military transport aircraft remained high. Military transport tasks in the months after the end of hostilities included restoring transport links with recently liberated countries in what had been German-occupied Europe. Aircraft were needed to deliver supplies and equipment, and to repatriate nationals of formerly-occupied countries who had served in Allied forces. In their years of exile many of those nationals had got married and started families whom they now wished to take home with them.

Therefore, in June 1945, 311 Squadron was transferred to RAF Transport Command and started flying GR.VI Liberators that had been converted into military transport aircraft. In each aircraft a temporary wooden floor covered the bomb bay doors. A cargo and passenger doorway was inserted in one side of the fuselage. If passengers were to be carried, wooden benches were installed. The colours of the aircraft remained as they had been under Coastal Command: white on the sides and underneath, with camouflage only on the upper surfaces. In August 1945, 311 Squadron was transferred from RAF Manston in Kent, England to Ruzyně Airport, Prague, Czechoslovakia to continue transport operations.

== Flight history ==
Aircraft KG867 carried the marking PP-N. PP was the code for 311 Squadron and -N identified the individual aircraft. Its captain was Pilot Officer Jaroslav Kudláček, a 25-year-old from Chrudim in eastern Bohemia. He had 1,421 flying hours' experience, 512 hours of which were on four-engined aircraft. Kudláček had married a British woman, their first son had been born in October 1941 and the family was looking forward to the boy's fourth birthday. Kudláček had just returned from the Royal Hospital, Wolverhampton, where Mrs Kudláčková had given birth to their second son about 10 days previously.

KG867 was scheduled to make a 665-mile (1,070 km) flight from Blackbushe to Ruzyně on Thursday 4 October to repatriate Czechoslovak service personnel and their families to their homeland. P/O Kudláček tried three times to take off but aborted each time because of a problem with one of the engines. After Kudláček aborted the third attempt the flight was postponed until the next day to let KG867 be examined and repaired.

One account states that the passengers were given temporary accommodation for the night. But another account, by Warrant Officer Pavel Svoboda of 311 Squadron, said "We spent a very unpleasant night, due to a lack of accommodation, especially the women with children."

By the next morning KG867's passenger manifest had been changed. Two 311 Squadron personnel who had been booked to fly as passengers – Warrant Officer Svoboda and WAAF Leading Aircraftwoman First Class Edita Sedláková – were displaced and their seats were reallocated to new VIP passengers (Marína Paulínyová and her entourage).

On Friday 5 October three Liberators including the rescheduled KG867 were to take off from Blackbushe. KG867 got airborne in good weather. Differing accounts suggest that it took off at either 1243 hours or 1420 hours. The aircraft made a normal circuit of the airfield as it turned to head for Prague. At the Liberator's cruising speed of 215 mph (346 km/h) the flight could be expected to take more than three hours, so KG867 was carrying a substantial amount of fuel.

=== Engine fire and crash ===
Then about three minutes into the flight, witnesses on the ground saw a fire had broken out on the aircraft's main wing around the No. 2 (inner port) engine. One Witness, George Greenwood of 4167 Squadron RAF, said he saw "a great plume of black smoke from one of the engines".

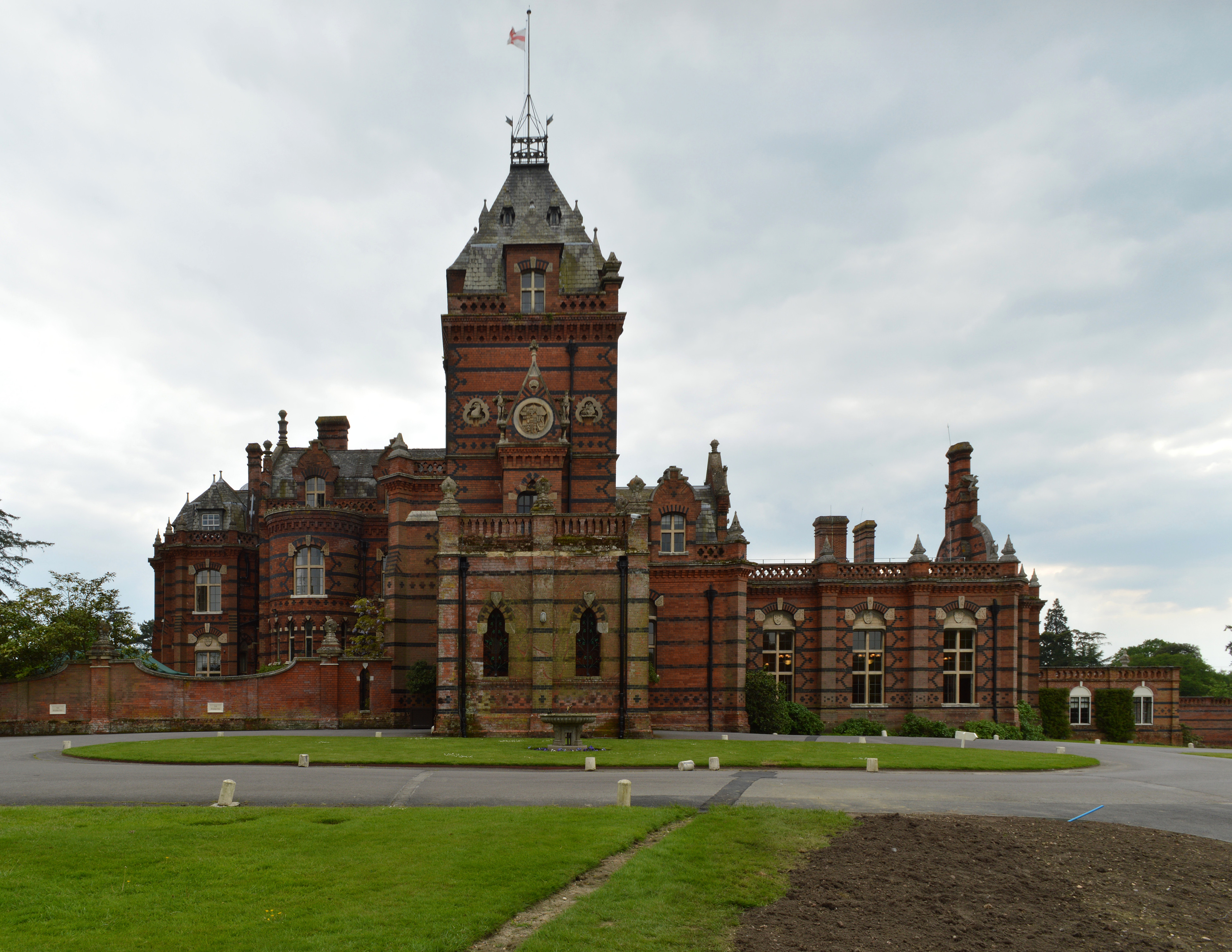
Elvetham Hall, on whose estate KG867 crashed

The plane was losing height and Kudláček tried to turn back to the airfield. About 1 1/2 miles (2.4 km) short of the airfield KG867 turned steeply to port, with the port wing down and diving at an angle of 30 degrees. About five minutes after take-off the port wing clipped a hedge causing the port engines to hit the ground in a field of sugar beet at Elvetham, east of Hartley Wintney. The aircraft cartwheeled, disintegrated and burst into flames.

The field was part of the Elvetham Hall estate of Sir Fitzroy Calthorpe, Baronet. A group of Romanichal had been trimming the sugar beet and were sitting around a log fire eating a meal. They had a narrow escape as the Liberator crashed and burst into flames only 200 yards (180 m) away from them.

In another field nearby a group of children were helping a farmer to pick potatoes. One girl, who was 12 at the time, recalled seeing KG867 fly over with its port wing down and both starboard engines "running very fast" before passing out of sight and crashing. The farmer told the children each to take a large potato and go home. She recalled that for days afterwards "Nobody was allowed to go anywhere near the crash. There were many lorries and people at the site for almost a week investigating the wreckage."

George Greenwood recalled that RAF Blackbushe was "stunned into silence". Another of the 311 Squadron Liberators due to fly that day was already taxiing on the airfield when KG867 crashed. The control tower recalled it and instructed the aircraft to wait but later it was cleared to take off; its crew were not told of the crash until after they had landed in Prague.

== Victims ==
The accident killed all 23 people aboard the aircraft. The five crew consisted of a pilot Jaroslav Kudláček, co-pilot Antonín Brož (aged 31, from Hradec Králové in northern Bohemia), navigator Karel Rybníček, wireless operator Bohumil Vaverka and flight engineer Zdeněk Sedlák (aged 33, from Prague).

The 17 official passengers included nine women, one of whom was Marína Paulínyová, aged 46, who was vice-chairman of the Czechoslovak Red Cross in London. Also among the passengers were five children travelling with their mothers. The eldest child, Eva Šafranková, was three years old. Jiři Rosenblum and Helena Žaludová were two years old. Twins Ladíslav Soběslavsky and Marenka Soběslavská were just 18 months old.

The body of another person was found at the crash site. It was so badly burned that investigators could not tell if it was that of a man or a woman. At first its identity was a mystery. But LACW Sedláková, the wife of Flt Sgt Sedlák, the flight engineer, had been reported missing after KG867 took off and she failed to return home to her flat in London.

Sedláková had been born Edita Hermannová, a Czechoslovak Jew who reached the UK as one of Nicholas Winton's Kindertransport refugees in 1939. Her father had already died at that time and her brother Kurt had entered UK independently as a refugee a few months earlier in 1939. The Germans had murdered their mother, Hedvika, at Auschwitz in October 1944. After schooling in England Edita enlisted in the WAAF and was posted to 311 Squadron, where she and Zdeněk Sedlák met. They were married in May 1945. Sedláková was described as "a high-spirited girl" who was "deeply in love with her husband". About a fortnight before the crash, Sedláková had secured her discharge from the RAF so that she and Sedlák could return to their homeland together. She was last seen at Blackbushe in the vicinity of luggage that was to be loaded onto the aircraft. Either by herself or with the help of her husband she had boarded KG867 unauthorised. Sedláková was the only WAAF fatality in the six-year history of 311 Squadron.

== Cause ==
Débris was scattered at the crash site. Burnt pieces of cowling from the inner port engine were found about 1/2 mile (800 m) before the point of impact. One of the starboard engines had been thrown about 200 yards (180 m) away from the point of impact. Other wreckage was thrown up to 250 yards (230 m) ahead of the point of impact.

The official investigation found:

The port inner engine caught fire due to a petrol escape from a ruptured pipe between the carburettor and oil dilution valve due to chafing. Ignition believed to be from exhaust pipe conduit to turbo supercharger.

The fuel pipe would then have been burnt away, which would have caused fuel starvation to the No. 1 (outer port) engine. With the port wing on fire and both port engines out of action, the aircraft would have been increasingly difficult to control.

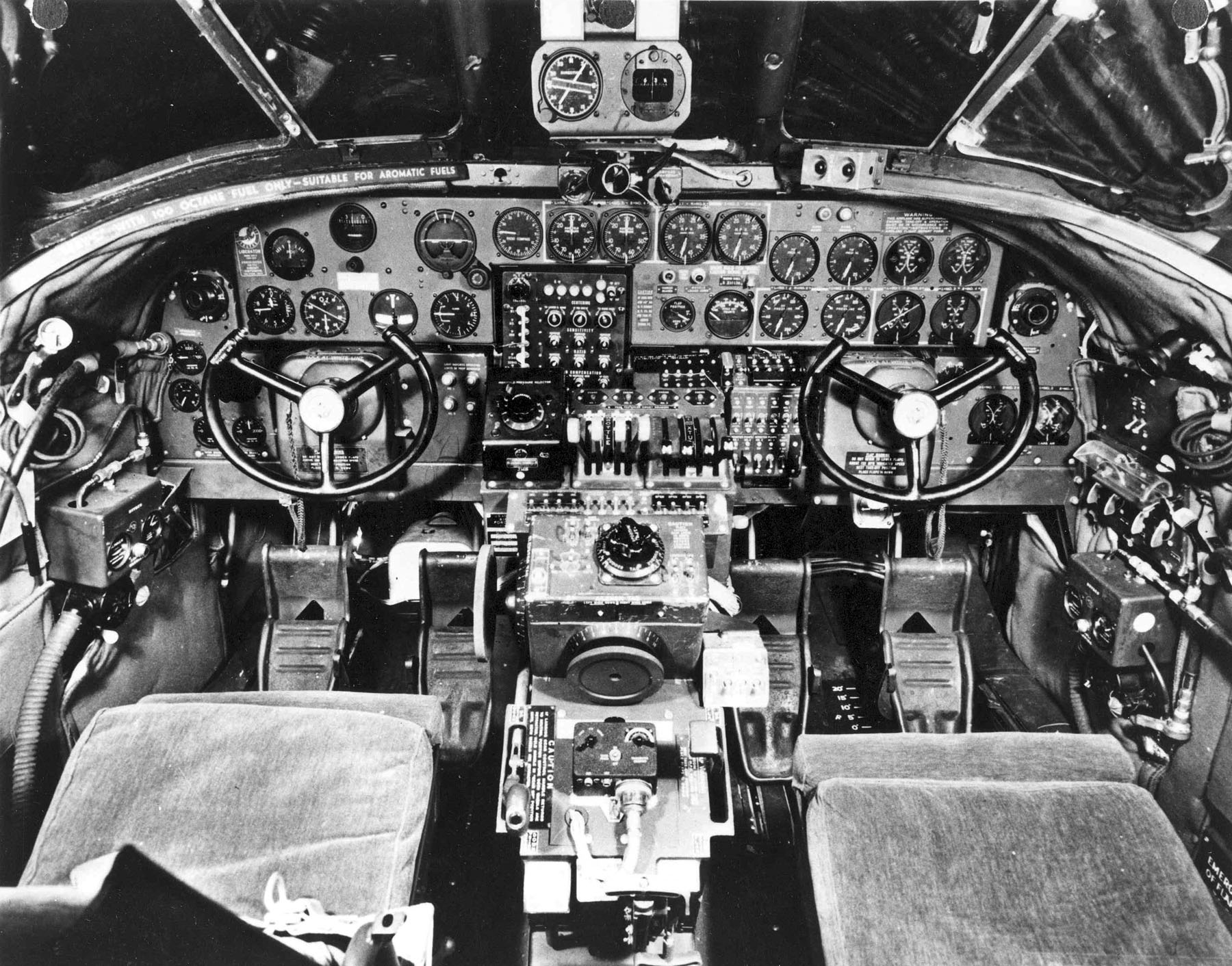
Inside a Liberator cockpit, looking forward. The co-pilot's seat is on the starboard side (right).

The aircraft had no fire detection or warning devices. But it had two built-in CO_{2} fire extinguishers to fight engine fires. The extinguishers were not automatic. There was a control panel on the starboard side of the cockpit, from which the co-pilot would operate the extinguishers when instructed by the pilot. Investigators found that both of the extinguishers had been discharged. This suggested that a member of the crew, presumably the co-pilot, Warrant Officer Brož, had tried to extinguish the engine fire.

Access to the control panel was poor, as it was partly obstructed by an emergency pump for the aircraft's hydraulic equipment. The fire extinguisher control panel included selector switches for the co-pilot to select which of the four engines to douse with CO_{2}. Investigators found that aboard KG867 the selector switch for the port engines was in the "off" position and the selector for the starboard engines was switched to extinguish the inner starboard engine. This suggested that in the emergency, Warrant Officer Brož may have selected to extinguish the wrong engine by mistake.

The presence of an unauthorised extra passenger aboard, LACW Sedláková, was not considered to have contributed to the accident.

== Aftermath and burials ==
On 6 October 1945 the Czechoslovak Government announced it had terminated the repatriation of its nationals from the UK by air transport. Thereafter they were sent by ship from a British port to Ostend in Belgium, and then onward by train across Belgium and Germany with the assistance of NMBS/SNCB. The Czechoslovak Embassy in London announced that about 400 people would leave Britain by sea for Ostend on 11 October, followed by about another 400 on 26 October and about 1,200 in November.

Also on 11 October, 18 of the victims of the crash were buried at Brookwood Cemetery in Surrey. All five of the aircrew were laid to rest in the Czechoslovak section of Brookwood Military Cemetery. 13 of the passengers share a common grave in part of the civilian cemetery in Long Avenue called the Old Roman Catholic Ground. The common grave has one headstone bearing the names of those 13 passengers, including stowaway Edita Sedláková. A separate, smaller plaque commemorating Sedláková's RAF service was added in front of the monument in November 2015.

Five of the passengers are not buried in the shared grave at Brookwood. They are Marta Obrazová, Jiři Rosenblum, Anna Rosenblumová, Otto Schwarz and Helena Wodaková.

Being displaced from the flight saved Warrant Officer Svoboda's life. He recalled "my name was taken off the manifest to go, and I was replaced by reason I was never informed" (sic). In December 2017 the War Graves Photographic Project posted on Facebook about the 1945 crash at Elvetham. Sue Albery (née Hrabáková) responded that her parents, Doris and Eddy Hrabák, had given up their seats on the flight to enable Edita and Zdenĕk to fly together. Sue wrote in her reply that had her parents had not done so, "I would not be writing this".

== See also ==
- 1945 in aviation
- 1942 Ruislip Wellington accident, in which a Vickers Wellington of 311 Squadron crashed at South Ruislip, killing all 15 people aboard plus six civilians on the ground
- Sutton Wick air crash, in which a wrongly-fitted non-return valve caused fuel starvation on an RAF Blackburn Beverley transport aircraft in 1957, leading it to crash and burst into flames near Abingdon-on-Thames

== Bibliography ==
- Anonymous. Register of Burials in the London Necropolis. Brookwood: London Necropolis Company. 11 October 1945.
- "Crash in Hampshire". The Times. No. 50267. London. 8 October 1945. p. 4.
- "Mystery of 23rd body in blazing 'plane wreck". The Scotsman. 8 October 1945.
- "Girl wife gave life for love". The People. Odhams Press. 7 October 1945.
- "Passenger 'Plane Crashes in Hampshire: 23 Killed". Coventry Evening Telegraph. 6 October 1945.
- Halley, James (1999). Broken Wings – Post-War Royal Air Force Accidents. Tunbridge Wells: Air-Britain (Historians) Ltd. pp. 7–24. ISBN 0-85130-290-4.
- Vančata, Pavel (2013). 311 Squadron. Sandomierz: Stratus, for Mushroom Model Publications. pp. 82–83. ISBN 978-83-61421-43-6.
- Hermann, Michael, Eighty Years On, 3P Publishing, Corby, 2019. ISBN 978-1-911559-71-9
