= Jindřich Svoboda (aviator) =

Royal Air Force officer

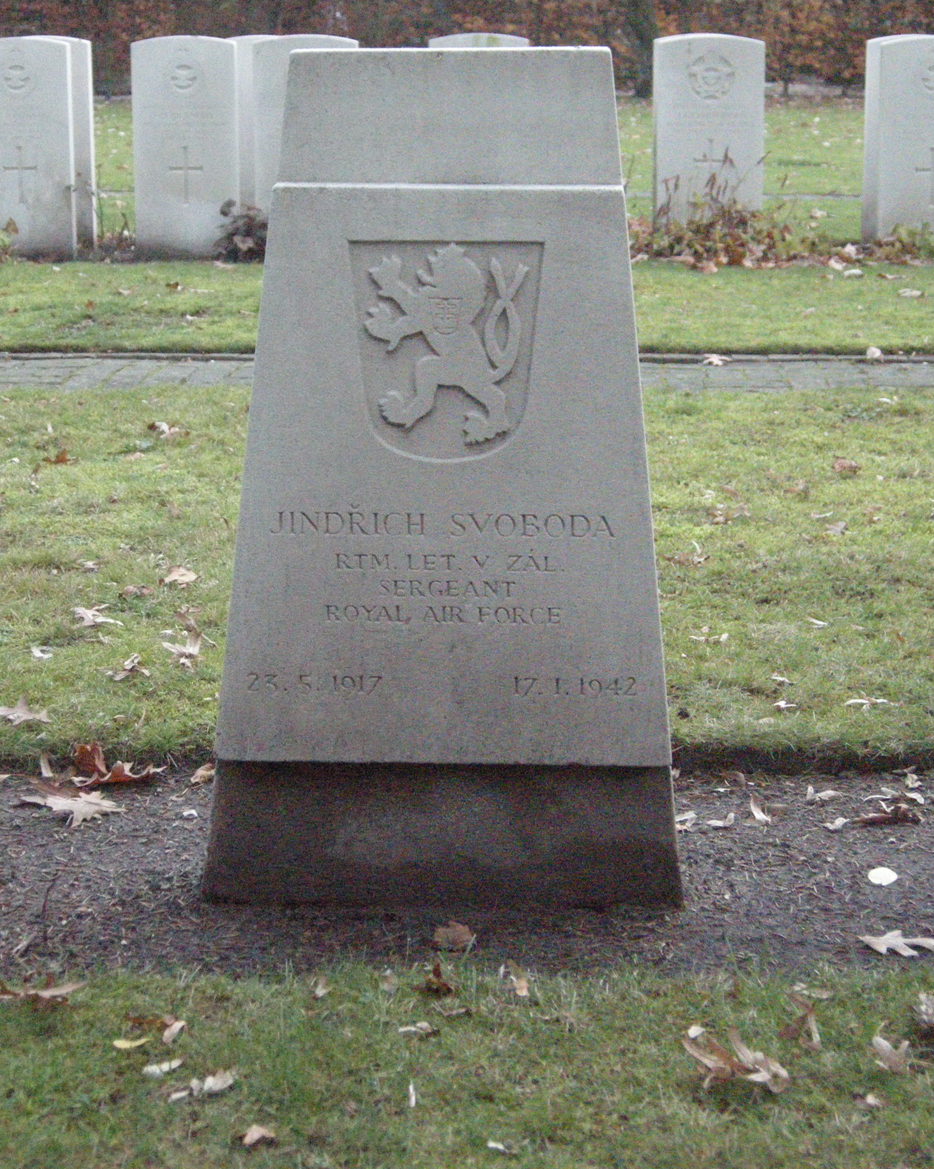
The gravestone of Jindřich Svoboda at the military section of the General Cemetery Gilzerbaan, Tilburg, Netherlands

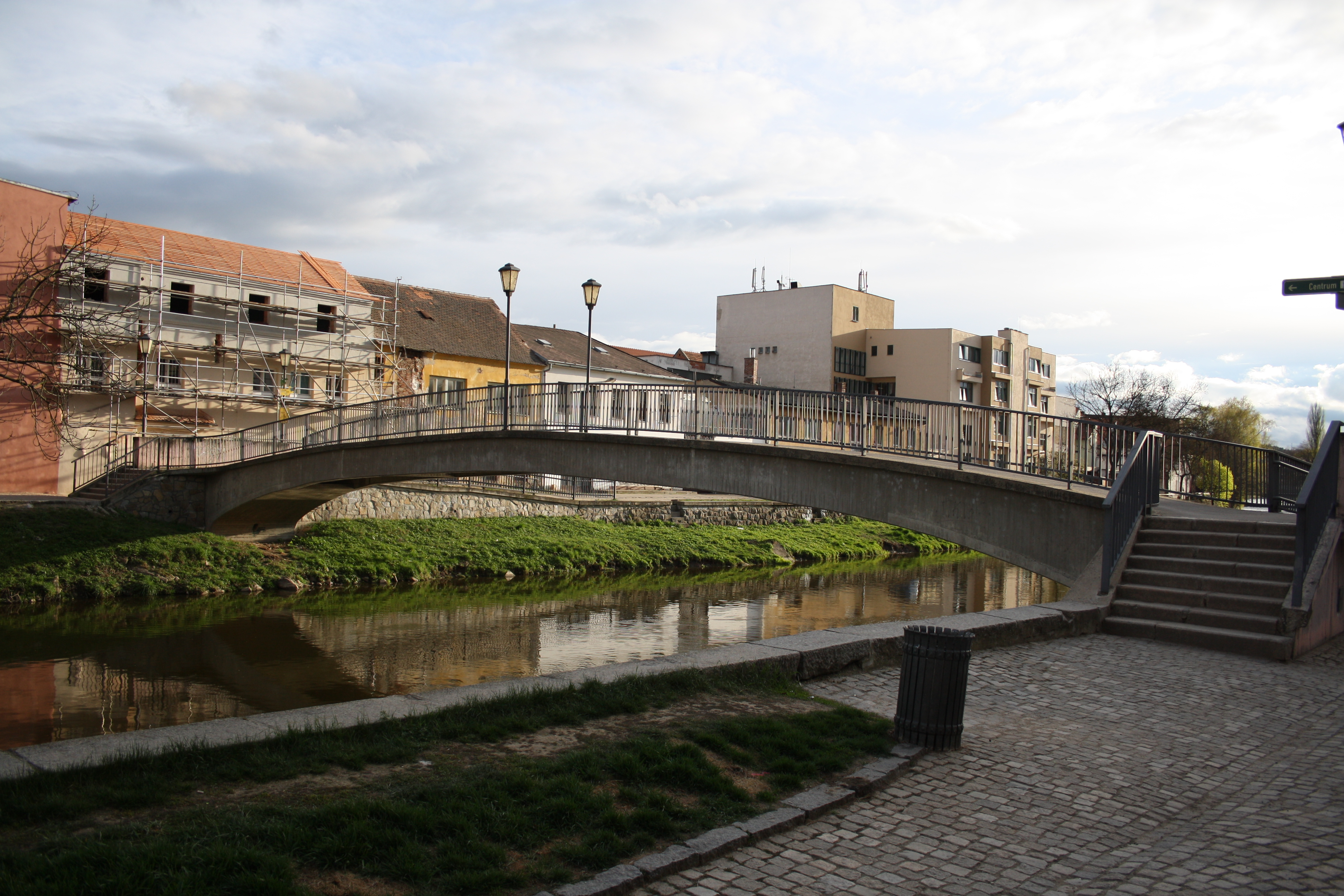
Footbridge named after Jindřich Svoboda, Třebíč, Czech Republic

Jindřich Svoboda (23 May 1917 – 17 January 1942) was a Czech bomber captain of the 311th Squadron RAF in World War II, who was made a colonel posthumously.

Jindřich Svoboda was born in Jungmannova Street in Třebíč. At an early age, his family moved to Zámostí where they lived in No. 119. He was a member of the Junák association (Association of Scouts and Guides of the Czech Republic) and his nickname was Horse. In the year 1936 he attended the Military Aviation School in Prostějov. When his Czech homeland was in danger he joined the air force as a volunteer.

On 24 January 1940 Svoboda went to Slovakia and from there he travelled via Hungary, Yugoslavia, Greece, Turkey, Syria and North Africa to France and then to Great Britain where he was trained as a bomber pilot. He had to his credit 24 operational flights in total, 16 of them as a captain.

His last flight was a raid on Bremen. Their Vickers Wellington was shot down and crashed in the Netherlands. J. Svoboda, J. Brož and R. Mašek died while K. Batelka, Z. Sichrovský and Josef Šnajdr survived. Jindřich Svoboda is buried in the military section of the General Cemetery Gilzerbaan in Tilburg, the Netherlands.

The Junák association of Třebíč and in 2003 the footbridge in Třebíč are named after him. In 2006 a commemorative plaque was unveiled at the townhall building in Třebíč in memory of aviators of the RAF who were born in Třebíč.
