= Arnošt Valenta =

- Memorial to "The Fifty" at Stalag Luft III listing "F. O. Valenta G. W.", centre right
- Nickname: Wally
- Born: 25 October 1912; Svébohov, Austria-Hungary
- Died: 31 March 1944 (aged 31) Halbau, Germany
- Allegiance: Czechoslovakia; France; United Kingdom
- Branch: Czechoslovak Army; Royal Air Force
- Service years: 1933–44
- Rank: Pilot Officer

Arnošt Valenta (Czech pronunciation: [ˈarnoʃt ˈvalɛnta]; 25 October 1912 – 31 March 1944) was a Czechoslovak Army officer who became a Royal Air Force Volunteer Reserve radio operator. He was murdered by the Gestapo in March 1944.

== Capture ==
Valenta was a radio operator with the Czechoslovak-crewed No. 311 Squadron RAF, a medium bomber squadron based at RAF East Wretham in Norfolk. His final mission was in Vickers Wellington Mk IC L7842, call sign KX-T. The aircraft's usual radio operator, P/O Jaroslav Partyk, was ill and unable to fly, so Valenta was assigned in his place. The other crew members were:

- P/O 82541 František Cigoš, RAF PoW No. 402
- Sgt 787198 Petr Uruba, RAF PoW No. 450
- P/O 82588 Emil Bušina, PAF PoW No. 401
- Sgt 787232 Gustav Kopal, RAF PoW No. 441
- P/O 82903 Karel Křižek, RAF PoW No. 407

On 6 February 1941 the crew took part in an air raid on Boulogne-sur-Mer in German-occupied France. On the return flight the navigator, P/O Bušina, was taken ill with altitude sickness. The commander, P/O Cigoš, then used the radio to make position checks with England. After a while the radio malfunctioned, so the crew resorted to estimating their position.

A strong wind sent the aircraft off course. Running short of fuel, Cigoš misjudged that they were over England, and landed at an airfield at Flers, France. Both the crew and their aircraft were captured. The aircraft was later flown by the Luftwaffe at its Erprobungsstelle (experimental and test facility) near Rechlin in Mecklenburg.

== The Great Escape ==
Nationalities of the 50 executed
(United Kingdom) 21 British
(Canada) 6 Canadian
(Poland) 6 Polish
(Australia) 5 Australian
(South Africa) 3 South African
(New Zealand) 2 New Zealanders
(Norway) 2 Norwegian
(Belgium) 1 Belgian
(Czechoslovakia) 1 Czechoslovak
(France) 1 Frenchman
(Greece) 1 Greek
(Lithuania) 1 Lithuanian

Valenta played a significant role in preparations for The Great Escape from Stalag Luft III near Sagan in Germany (now Żagań in Poland) because he was the Head of Contacts (i.e. scrounging) for the "X" Organization in the North Compound. He was among the first pairs of POWs to escape from the camp using the tunnel code named "Harry" on 24 March 1944.

Within days Valenta was recaptured near Görlitz in Silesia. He was last seen alive on 31 March 1944 in a group with ten other recaptured RAF officers who had been placed in the charge of Walter Scharpwinkel, an SS–Obersturmbannführer and Oberregierungsrat (senior government councillor) for the Görlitz district. He was one of 50 recaptured POWs who were murdered by the Gestapo on Hitler's orders.

After the war, a UK Special Investigation Branch officer interviewed Scharpwinkel about the murders in a Moscow prison in 1946. Sometime later the Soviet authorities announced that Scharpwinkel had died in prison.

== Awards and recognition ==
- Medal of Heroism (2025)

== Bibliography ==
- Andrews, Allen (1976). Exemplary Justice. Corgi Books. ISBN 0-552-10800-6.
- Burgess, Alan (2004). The longest tunnel: the true story of World War II's great escape. Annapolis: Naval Institute Press. p. 127. ISBN 978-1-59114-097-9.
- Vančata, Pavel (2013). 311 Squadron. Sandomierz: Stratus, for Mushroom Model Publications. pp. 16, 18, 19. ISBN 978-83-61421-43-6.
- Vance, Jonathan (2000). A Gallant Company: The True Story of "The Great Escape". New York: ibooks, inc. p. 110.
