= Marína Paulínyová =

Slovak-American diplomat and Red Cross humanitarian aiding Czechoslovak WWII POWs

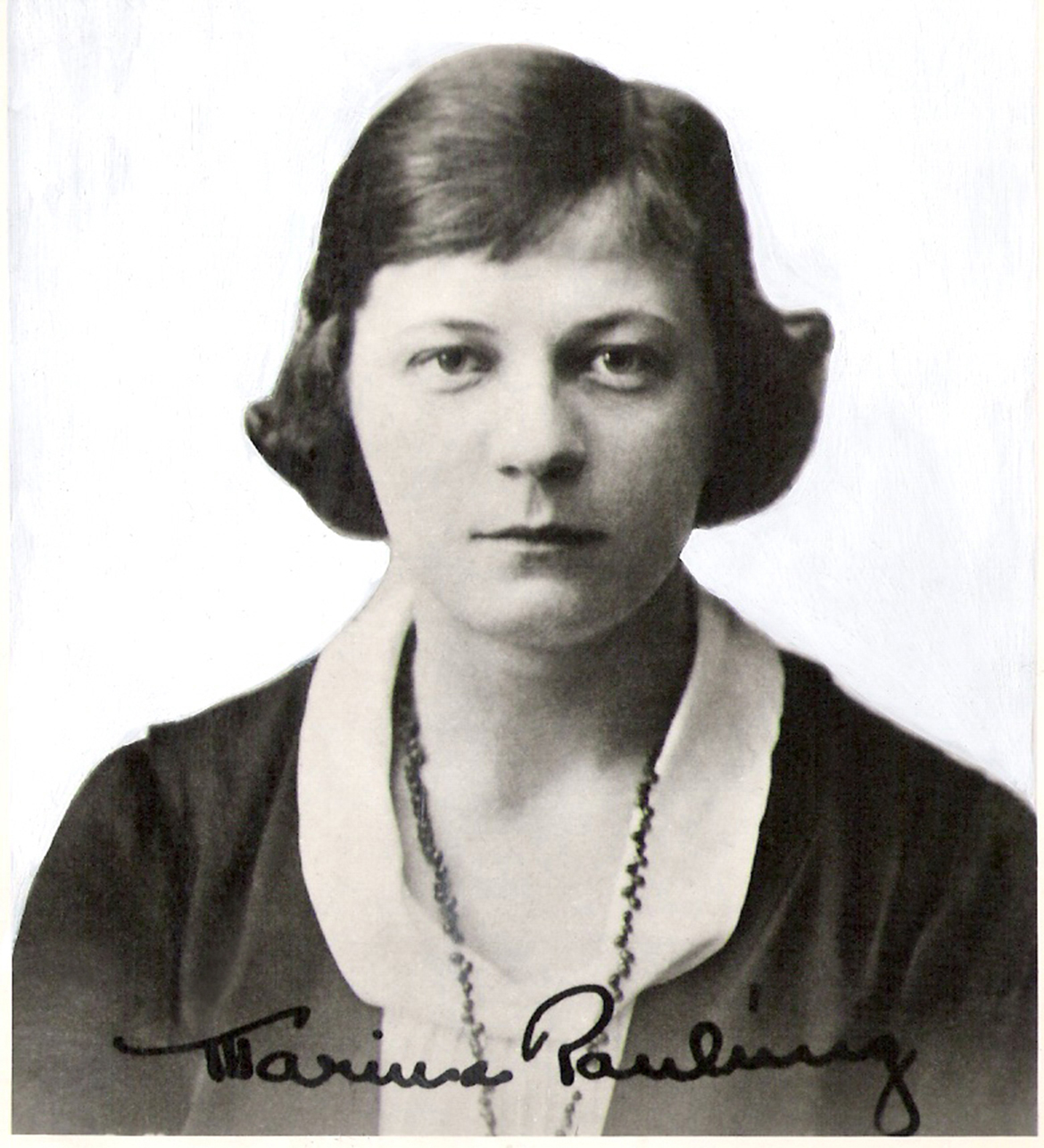
- Passport photograph of Paulínyová
- Born: March 28, 1897; Slovenské Pravno, Kingdom of Hungary
- Died: October 5, 1945 (aged 48); Blackbushe Airport, England
- Other name: Marína Pauliny
- Occupations: Diplomat, journalist, humanitarian
- Known for: Providing relief for Czechoslovak prisoners of war during World War II

Marína Paulínyová (English: Marína Pauliny; 28 March 1897 – 5 October 1945) was a Slovak-American diplomat, journalist, humanitarian and translator. She served as a deputy director of the Czechoslovak Red Cross.

== Early life ==
Paulínyová was born in Slovenské Pravno to a Lutheran family. When she was eight years old, the family emigrated to the United States for economic reasons. The family settled in Stamford, Connecticut. Although the family originally planned to return to Slovakia, they stayed mainly due to the sudden death of Paulínyová's father.

As a teenager, Paulínyová was active in helping Slovak immigrant workers find employment in America. After the independence of Czechoslovakia, she started working at the country's consulate in the US.

== Interwar period ==
On 30 May 1919 Paulínyová boarded a Red Cross ship in San Francisco bound to relieve Czechoslovak legionaries stranded in Siberia. The ship crashed and nearly sank but its passengers including Paulínyová, who was on board as a nurse, were rescued by Japanese sailors. Paulínyová spent next three years organizing medical help for the legionaries and joined the final transport with injured legionaries to Czechoslovakia.

In the interwar period Paulínyová divided her time between Czechoslovakia and the US. In Czechoslovakia she established a YWCA branch in Bratislava and headed the first travel agency in Slovakia Slovakotour. In the US, she operated the Czechoslovak Art Studio in Chicago and was active in the Anglo American Society of Czechoslovakia. She also assisted the nascent Czechoslovak diplomacy, chiefly as a translator.

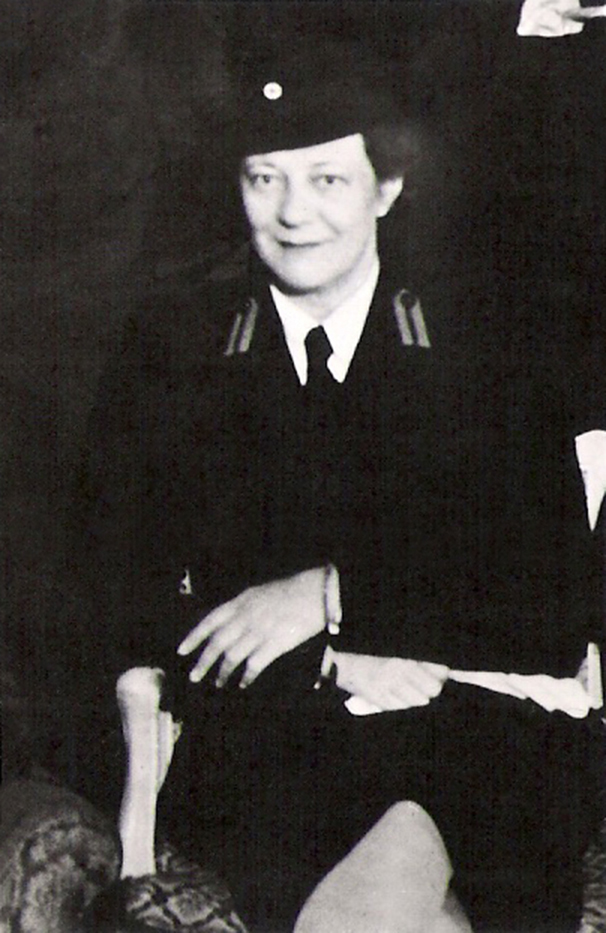
Paulínyová in 1944

== World War II era ==
The outbreak of World War II caught Paulínyová in Bratislava, where she was posted as a correspondent for the American press. Narrowly evading arrest by the fascist regime, she left for London, where the Czechoslovak government in exile was located. In Britain, she was active in the Czechoslovak Red Cross, chiefly in the area of organizing relief for Czechoslovak prisoners of war captured by Germans, who otherwise received minimal support due to not being internationally recognized as combatants. Paulínyová managed to smuggle the aid for the captives raised through private donors by bundling it with the aid for British captives, who enjoyed international recognition, organized by the British Red Cross. She also raised funds to support Czechoslovak students in the United Kingdom, who struggled to continue their studies without any support from home.

== Death and legacy ==
On 5 October 1945 a Consolidated B-24 Liberator plane, which took off from Blackbushe Airport with Paulínyová and other Czechoslovak passengers on board flying to Prague, crashed near Elvetham with no survivors. The victims of the crash are commemorated by a memorial at Brookwood Cemetery in Surrey, England maintained by the Czech and Slovak embassies.

The contributions of Paulínyová, as well as her death remained largely unknown in Czechoslovakia, due to her allegiance with the democratic government in exile, which the Communist perceived as Western and thus the enemy in Cold War logic. As a result, Paulínyová only started receiving recognition well in the 21st century. In 2022, a street in the Dúbravka borough of Bratislava was named after Paulínyová. In 2024 she was awarded the Cross of Milan Rastislav Štefánik 2nd class by president Zuzana Čaputová.
