= Svébohov =

- Municipality
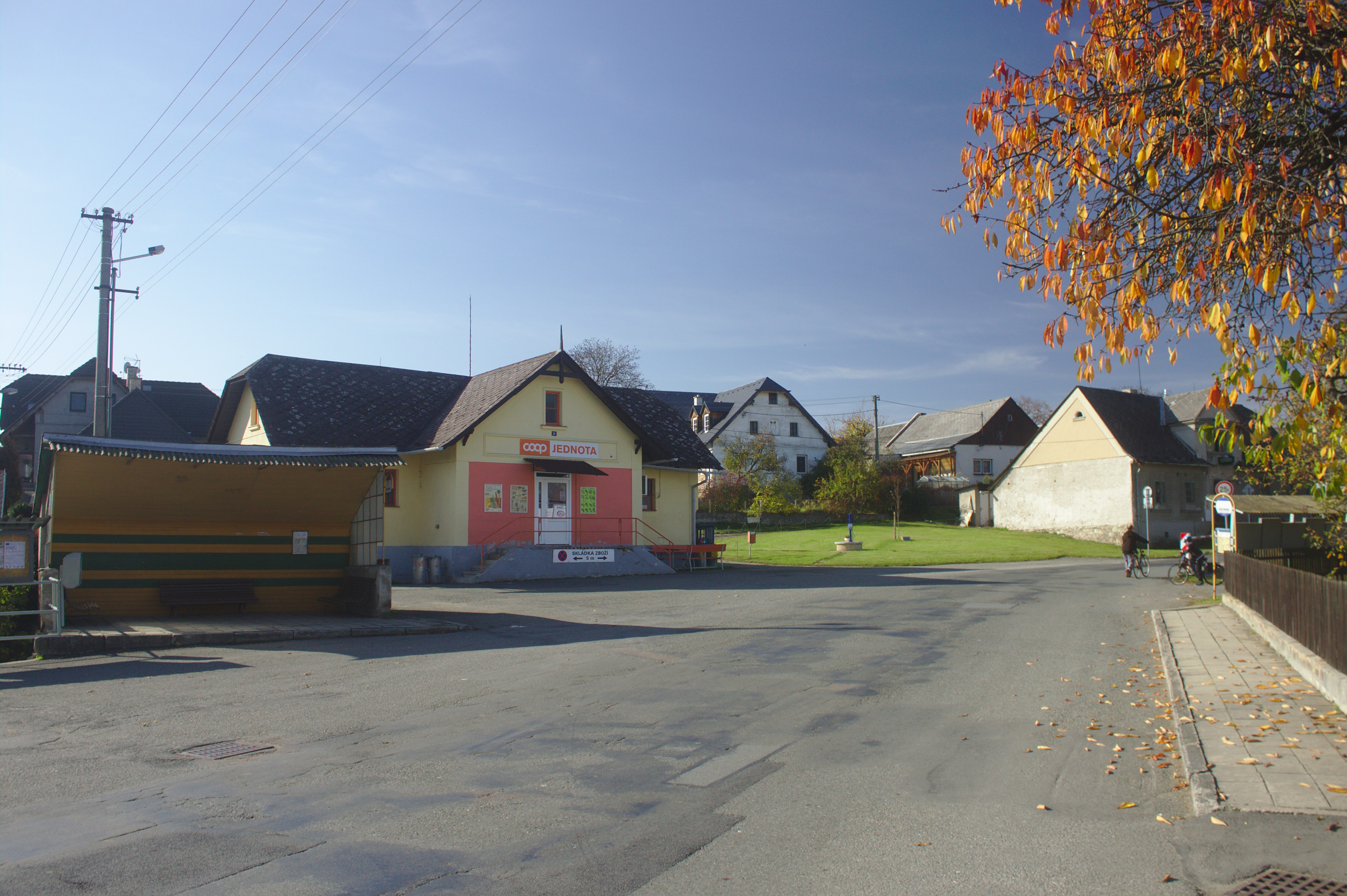
- Centre of Svébohov

- Flag Coat of arms

- Location in the Czech Republic
- Coordinates: 49°55′12″N 16°50′21″E
- Country: Czech Republic
- Region: Olomouc
- District: Šumperk
- First mentioned: 1358

Area
  - Total: 6.15 km^{2} (2.37 sq mi)
- Elevation: 417 m (1,368 ft)

Population (2026-01-01)
  - Total: 418
  - Density: 68.0/km^{2} (176/sq mi)
- Time zone: UTC+1 (CET)
  - Summer (DST): UTC+2 (CEST)
- Postal codes: 789 01
- Website: www.svebohov.cz

Svébohov (German: Schwillbogen) is a municipality and village in Šumperk District in the Olomouc Region of the Czech Republic. It has about 400 inhabitants.

Svébohov is about 11 km (7 mi) southwest of Šumperk, 48 km (30 mi) northwest of Olomouc and 174 km (108 mi) east of Prague.

== Demographics ==
Historical population
Year	Pop.	±%
1869	805	—
1880	768	−4.6%
1890	788	+2.6%
1900	767	−2.7%
1910	740	−3.5%
1921	664	−10.3%
1930	641	−3.5%
1950	508	−20.7%
1961	524	+3.1%
1970	462	−11.8%
1980	452	−2.2%
1991	408	−9.7%
2001	439	+7.6%
2011	420	−4.3%
2021	392	−6.7%
Source: Censuses

== Notable people ==
- Arnošt Valenta (1912–1944), army officer
