= German submarine U-1060 =

German World War II submarine

Coordinates: 65°24′N 12°0′E

History

Nazi Germany
- Name: U-1060
- Ordered: 25 August 1941
- Builder: Germaniawerft, Kiel
- Yard number: 694
- Laid down: 7 July 1942
- Launched: 8 March 1943
- Commissioned: 15 May 1943
- Fate: Grounded on 27 October 1944

General characteristics
- Class & type: Type VIIF submarine
- Displacement: 1,084 tonnes (1,067 long tons) surfaced; 1,181 t (1,162 long tons) submerged
- Length: 77.63 m (254 ft 8 in) o/a; 60.40 m (198 ft 2 in) pressure hull
- Beam: 7.30 m (23 ft 11 in) o/a; 4.70 m (15 ft 5 in) pressure hull
- Height: 9.60 m (31 ft 6 in)
- Draught: 4.91 m (16 ft 1 in)
- Installed power: 2,800–3,200 PS (2,100–2,400 kW; 2,800–3,200 bhp) (diesels); 750 PS (550 kW; 740 shp) (electric)
- Propulsion: 2 shafts; 2 × diesel engines; 2 × electric motors
- Speed: 16.9–17.6 knots (31.3–32.6 km/h; 19.4–20.3 mph) surfaced; 7.9 knots (14.6 km/h; 9.1 mph) submerged
- Range: 14,700 nmi (27,200 km; 16,900 mi) at 10 knots (19 km/h; 12 mph) surfaced; 75 nmi (139 km; 86 mi) at 4 knots (7.4 km/h; 4.6 mph)submerged
- Test depth: 200 m (660 ft); Calculated crush depth: 220–240 m (720–790 ft)
- Crew: 4 officers, 42 enlisted
- Armament: 5 × 53.3 cm (21 in) torpedo tubes (4 bow, 1 stern); 14 × torpedoes or up to 40 in transport role; 1 × 3.7 centimetres (1.5 in) SK C/30 anti-aircraft gun (1,195 rounds); 2 × 2 centimetres (0.79 in) Flak anti-aircraft guns (4,380 rounds)

Service record
- Part of: 5th U-boat Flotilla; 15 May 1943 – 27 October 1944
- Identification codes: M 52 184
- Commanders: Oblt.z.S. Herbert Brammer; 15 May 1943 – 27 October 1944
- Operations: 6 patrols: 1st patrol: a. 14 – 16 December 1943; b. 17 – 23 December 1943; c. 29 December 1943 – 7 January 1944; 2nd patrol: a. 18 – 27 January 1944; b. 1 – 5 February 1944; c. 6 February 1944; d. 9 February 1944; e. 10 – 12 February 1944; 3rd patrol: a. 28 March – 6 April 1944; b. 10 – 27 April 1944; 4th patrol: a. 13 – 20 May 1944; b. 23 – 28 May 1944; c. 30 May 1944; d. 31 May 1944; e. 1 – 3 June 1944; 5th patrol: a. 20 – 24 June 1944; b. 24 – 26 June 1944; c. 30 June – 2 July 1944; d. 3 – 5 July 1944; e. 7 July 1944; f. 8 – 10 July 1944; g. 11 July 1944; h. 12 July 1944; i. 13 – 15 July 1944; 6th patrol: a. 7 – 9 October 1944; b. 12 – 17 October 1944; c. 22 – 25 October 1944; d. 26 – 27 October 1944
- Victories: None

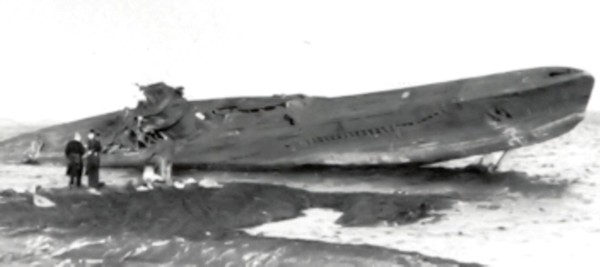
The U-1060 stranded on a sandbank.

German submarine U-1060 was a Type VIIF submarine of Nazi Germany's Kriegsmarine in World War II.

U-1060 was one of four Type VIIF torpedo transport submarines, which could carry up to 40 torpedoes, and were used to re-supply other U-boats at sea. U-1060 commissioned on 15 May 1943, served from 15 May 1943 until 27 October 1944 with 5th U-boat Flotilla, a training unit.

== Design ==
As one of the four German Type VIIF submarines, U-1060 had a displacement of 1,084 tonnes (1,067 long tons) when at the surface and 1,181 tonnes (1,162 long tons) while submerged. She had a total length of 77.63 m (254 ft 8 in), a pressure hull length of 60.40 m (198 ft 2 in), a beam of 7.30 m (23 ft 11 in), a height of 9.60 m (31 ft 6 in), and a draught of 4.91 m (16 ft 1 in). The submarine was powered by two Germaniawerft F46 supercharged four-stroke, six-cylinder diesel engines producing a total of 2,800 to 3,200 metric horsepower (2,060 to 2,350 kW; 2,760 to 3,160 shp) for use while surfaced, two AEG GU 460/8-276 double-acting electric motors producing a total of 750 shaft horsepower (760 PS; 560 kW) for use while submerged. She had two shafts and two 1.23 m (4 ft) propellers. The boat was capable of operating at depths of up to 230 metres (750 ft).

The submarine had a maximum surface speed of 16.9–17.6 knots (31.3–32.6 km/h; 19.4–20.3 mph) and a maximum submerged speed of 7.9 knots (14.6 km/h; 9.1 mph). When submerged, the boat could operate for 75 nautical miles (139 km; 86 mi) at 4 knots (7.4 km/h; 4.6 mph); when surfaced, she could travel 14,700 nautical miles (27,200 km; 16,900 mi) at 10 knots (19 km/h; 12 mph). U-1060 was fitted with five 53.3 cm (21 in) torpedo tubes (four fitted at the bow and one at the stern), fourteen torpedoes, one 8.8 cm (3.46 in) SK C/35 naval gun, 220 rounds, and various anti-aircraft gun. The boat had a complement of between 44 and 60.

== Service history ==
U-1060 did not conduct any offensive patrols. Between December 1943 and October 1944 she made six voyages transporting torpedoes from the naval base in Kiel to ports in German-occupied Norway.

On 27 October 1944 Fleet Air Arm Fireflies and Barracudas from the aircraft carrier HMS Implacable attacked U-1060 with rockets and depth charges, and the submarine ran aground on the Norwegian island of Fleina south of Brønnøysund.

On the morning of 29 October 1944, two Liberator C Mk V heavy bombers of the Czechoslovak-manned No. 311 Squadron RAF from RAF Tain in Scotland attacked the grounded submarine with wing-mounted SAP60 semi-armour piercing rocket projectiles (RP's). Liberator FL949/Y led by Flg Off Josef Pavelka hit her with seven RP's. The rocket projectile sight aboard Liberator BZ723/H led by Sqn Ldr Alois Šedivý failed, but its crew managed to hit the submarine with another eight RP's. BZ723/H also dropped four depth charges, two of which straddled U-1060 abaft her conning tower.

Finally two Halifax heavy bombers of No. 502 Squadron RAF depth charged the submarine. 12 of U-1060's crew died and 43 survived.

== Bibliography ==
- Bishop, Chris (2006). Kriegsmarine U-Boats, 1939–45. London: Amber Books. ISBN 978-1-904687-96-2.
- Busch, Rainer; Röll, Hans-Joachim (1999). German U-boat commanders of World War II: a biographical dictionary. Translated by Brooks, Geoffrey. London, Annapolis: Greenhill Books, Naval Institute Press. ISBN 1-55750-186-6.
- Busch, Rainer; Röll, Hans-Joachim (1999). Deutsche U-Boot-Verluste von September 1939 bis Mai 1945 [German U-boat losses from September 1939 to May 1945]. Der U-Boot-Krieg (in German). Vol. IV. Hamburg, Berlin, Bonn: Mittler. ISBN 3-8132-0514-2.
- Gröner, Erich; Jung, Dieter; Maass, Martin (1991). German Warships 1815–1945, U-boats and Mine Warfare Vessels. Vol. 2. Translated by Thomas, Keith; Magowan, Rachel. London: Conway Maritime Press. ISBN 0-85177-593-4.
- Osolsobě, Jiří (1990). Zbylo nás devět (in Czech) (2nd ed.). Prague: Naše vojsko. pp. 200–206. ISBN 80-206-0207-0., the author was the second pilot in Liberator FL949/Y
- Vančata, Pavel (2013). 311 Squadron. Sandomierz: Stratus, for Mushroom Model Publications. pp. 66–70. ISBN 978-83-61421-43-6.
