= Tomáš Lom =

Czech World War II veteran (1924–2021)

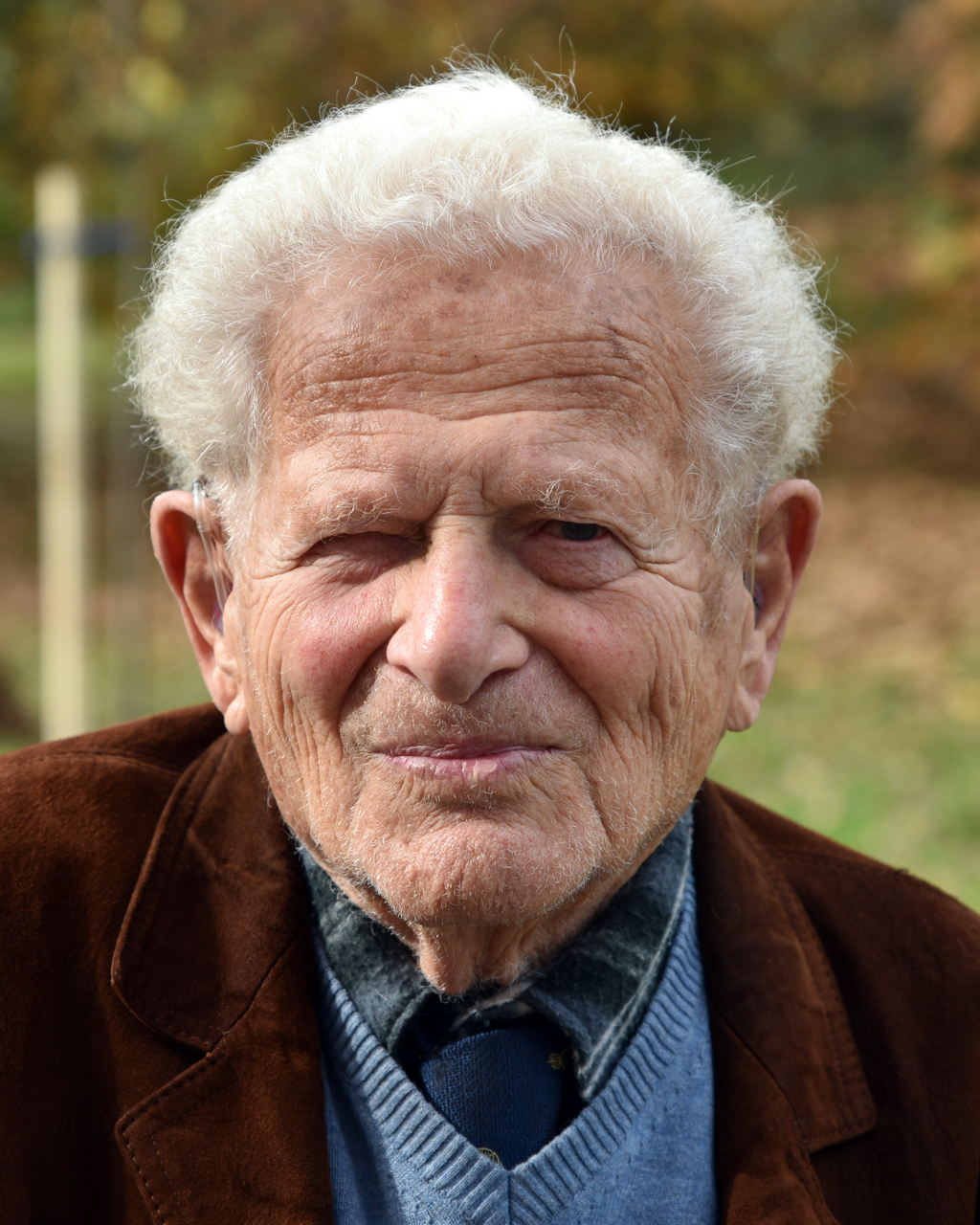
- Born: Tomáš Löwenstein; August 1, 1924; Vienna, Austria
- Died: June 23, 2021 (aged 96)
- Military career
- Branch: Royal Air Force
- Service years: 1943-1945
- Rank: sergeant
- Conflicts: World War II

Signature
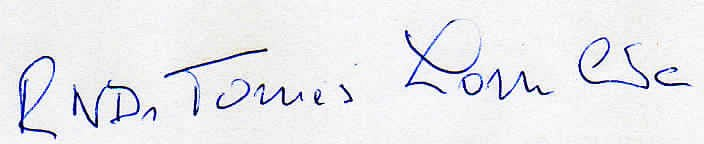

Tomáš Lom (born Tomáš Löwenstein, August 1, 1924 – June 23, 2021) was a Czech World War II hero of Jewish origin. Served as airman and radio operator in the No. 311 (Czechoslovak) Squadron RAF.

Tomáš Lom was born August 1, 1924, in Vienna to Jewish parents. His mother died in 1925 and soon after the family moved to Prague, where his father remarried in 1928. They lived in Prague until 1939. In early 1939 they emigrated to the United Kingdom, fearing the coming German invasion to Czechoslovakia.

In the UK he finished high school and studied math and physics at the University of Glasgow. However, immediately upon reaching 18 years of age, in 1942, he signed up for military service. After being trained as radio operator, he served in the 311th Czechoslovak Squadron of the RAF, in the rank of sergeant.

After the war, the family returned to Czechoslovakia. Tomáš graduated in math and physics from the Charles University and, until retirement, worked as a scientist.
