= Vladimír Nedvěd =

Czech flyer

- Vladimír Nedvěd
- Born: 27 March 1917; Brno, Czechoslovakia
- Died: 31 October 2012 (aged 95); Buderim, Australia
- Relatives: Luisa Prazakova
- Military career
- Allegiance: Czechoslovakia; United Kingdom
- Branch: Czechoslovak Air Force; Royal Air Force
- Service years: 1936–1958
- Rank: Wing Commander (RAF); Lieutenant General (Czech)
- Nicknames: Vlad, Ned
- Commands: No. 78 Squadron RAF (1952–53); No. 311 (Czechoslovak) Squadron RAF (1943–44)
- Conflicts: Second World War
- Awards: Member of the Order of the British Empire; Distinguished Flying Cross; Commander of the Order of the White Lion (Czech Republic); Order of Tomáš Garrigue Masaryk (Czech Republic); War Cross (4; Czechoslovakia)
- Other work: Business administration

Vladimír Nedvěd, MBE, DFC (27 March 1917 – 31 October 2012) was a Czech flyer who served with the Royal Air Force during the Second World War and the early Cold War period. He was appointed a Member of the Order of the British Empire for gallantry, and awarded the Distinguished Flying Cross, the Czech Gallantry Medal and the War Cross with three bars, and in later life the Order of the White Lion.

== Early life ==
Vladimír Nedvěd was born in Brno, Czechoslovakia, on 27 March 1917. He was born into a devoutly Christian household and would be sent to annual religious camps for children in the summer. Of this time and his relationship with God he recalled -

One evening, in the tent when I recited my prayer, I looked up at the night sky and saw a bright beam of light coming from the tops of trees to me. In my mind I knew that God heard my prayer and I felt his presence ... This beautiful and soothing experience never left me for a lifetime.

For his education he attended Kyjov High School before joining the Czech Air Force in October 1936. At the military academy he trained as a navigator and graduated in 1938 with the rank of flight lieutenant.

== Wartime service ==
=== German invasion and escape ===
With the invasion of Czechoslovakia by Nazi Germany in 1939, Nedvěd escaped to the west. Without identity papers he travelled by foot and train to Lebanon where he boarded a ship for France, which he reached in early 1940. However, the German invasion of France saw him needing to escape once more, this time to the United Kingdom in June 1940.

=== Service with the Royal Air Force ===
Upon reaching the United Kingdom, Nedvěd enlisted in the Royal Air Force Volunteer Reserve. He trained as a navigator and was deployed to No. 311 (Czech) Squadron, a Wellington bomber squadron. To his fellow Czech's he was known as Vlad, and Ned by his British colleagues.

Early in his service, on the night of 16 December 1940, Nedvěd and his crew were ordered to attack the German city of Mannheim. The bomber crashed shortly after take off from RAF East Wretham after an engine caught fire. After crashing into some trees, the uninjured Nedvěd went to the aid of his crew mates. After rescuing the pilot Nedvěd returned to the burning wreckage to aid the rear gunner. The fire was worsening and part of their bomb load exploded, still Nedvěd would not give up. Sadly, despite his heroism Nedvěd was the only survivor. For his gallantry he was appointed a Member of the Order of the British Empire.

Nedvěd would go on to complete 25 missions with No. 311 Squadron before going for pilot training.

After completing his pilot training Nedvěd returned to No. 311 Squadron who were now operating as part of Coastal Command. In this role Nedvěd found himself in an engagement with three Luftwaffe Junkers 88s while in a Wellington on 29 September 1942. An air gunner shot down one attacker and a second was compelled to withdraw with a burning engine. Nedvěd was then able to find cover in some cloud before diving to sea level and returning to base.

The squadron was re-equipped with Liberator bombers, their increased range enabled them to operate in what had previously been the 'air gap'. For his work on these patrols Nedvěd was awarded the Distinguished Flying Cross and promoted to squadron leader. This was added to by the Czech Government in Exile who presented Nedvěd with the Czech Gallantry Medal and War Cross with three bars.

Nedvěd took up a staff appointment with the RAF Third Tactical Air Force in Burma in April 1944. He still was able to fly despite the staff position, supporting the Battle of Imphal and the Battle of Kohima with supply flights.

After six months in the Far East, he returned to the UK where he took up an appointment in the Czech Inspectorate with Transport Command. Of his wartime service, Nedvěd wrote in later life:

To our British friends, I like to say this from my heart: it was our privilege to fight Hitler's war machine side by side with you. Fighting the Battle of Britain, fighting the Battle of Atlantic, was also fighting the Battle of Czechoslovakia. Your wonderful country offered us a new home in wartime. It was a great honour and joy to be a part of the best air force in the world – the Royal Air Force.

== Return to Czechoslovakia ==
Following the German surrender Nedvěd was able to return to Czechoslovakia in August 1945. He had a period as an instructor at the Air Force College, specialising in tactics, before attending the Military Staff College in Prague. This was followed by a promotion to the rank of lieutenant colonel.

=== Second escape to the west ===
Following the 1948 Communist take over of Czechoslovakia, those who fought with the Royal Air Force faced persecution. Nedvěd joined a group who were going to make their escape to the west. He booked three seats on an internal flight to Bratislava which was piloted by a friend. After take off the men took over the flight (placing the Communist co-pilot under arrest) and took the aeroplane to a United States Air Force base near Munich in Germany. Once there most of the passengers claimed asylum as political refugees.

Nedvěd returned to the United Kingdom with his family and rejoined the RAF in February 1948. Initially he served with No. 31 Squadron flying transport aircraft for two years and then took command of No. 78 Squadron operating Vickers Valetta aeroplanes in the Middle East. Returning to the UK he converted to jet aircraft and was appointed as adjutant at the Central Gunnery School. His final RAF appointment came in 1956 when he was placed in command of the ground officers selection board. In 1958 he retired from the air force and emigrated to Australia with his family, setting up home in Sydney.

== Australia and later life ==
Nedvěd began his life in Australia working in administration for the Shell-BP oil company before moving to the Sunshine Coast in Queensland. He wrote about his wartime experiences and served as a lay preacher with the Uniting Church.

With the fall of Communism, Nedvěd was honoured by his home country. Czech President Vaclav Havel promoted him to the rank of major general in the Air Force Reserve. Nedvěd also received the Commander of the Order of the White Lion on 28 October 1996, the Czech Republic's highest honour. He was further honoured with the award of the Order of Tomas Garrigue Masaryk. He received a promotion to lieutenant general on 8 May 2005. Nedvěd died at North Buderim on 31 October 2012.

== Personal life ==
In 1945 Nedvěd married Luisa Prazakova, also from Brno, who was working in London. The couple would go on to have three sons.
