= Josef Šnajdr =

Josef Šnajdr (22 January 1909, Luhačovice – 14 September 1992, Brookwood, Surrey) was a Czech Major General, pilot and later commander of the 311th Czechoslovak Bomber Squadron of the Royal Air Force during World War II, recipient of multiple military decorations.

== Decorations ==
Some of them are:

- 3x Czechoslovak War Cross 1939–1945
- 2x Czechoslovakia Medal For Valor
- Czechoslovakia Medal of Merit 1.st.
- Commemorative Medal of the Czechoslovak Foreign Army with Plate F and VB
