= Slovenské Pravno =

- Municipality
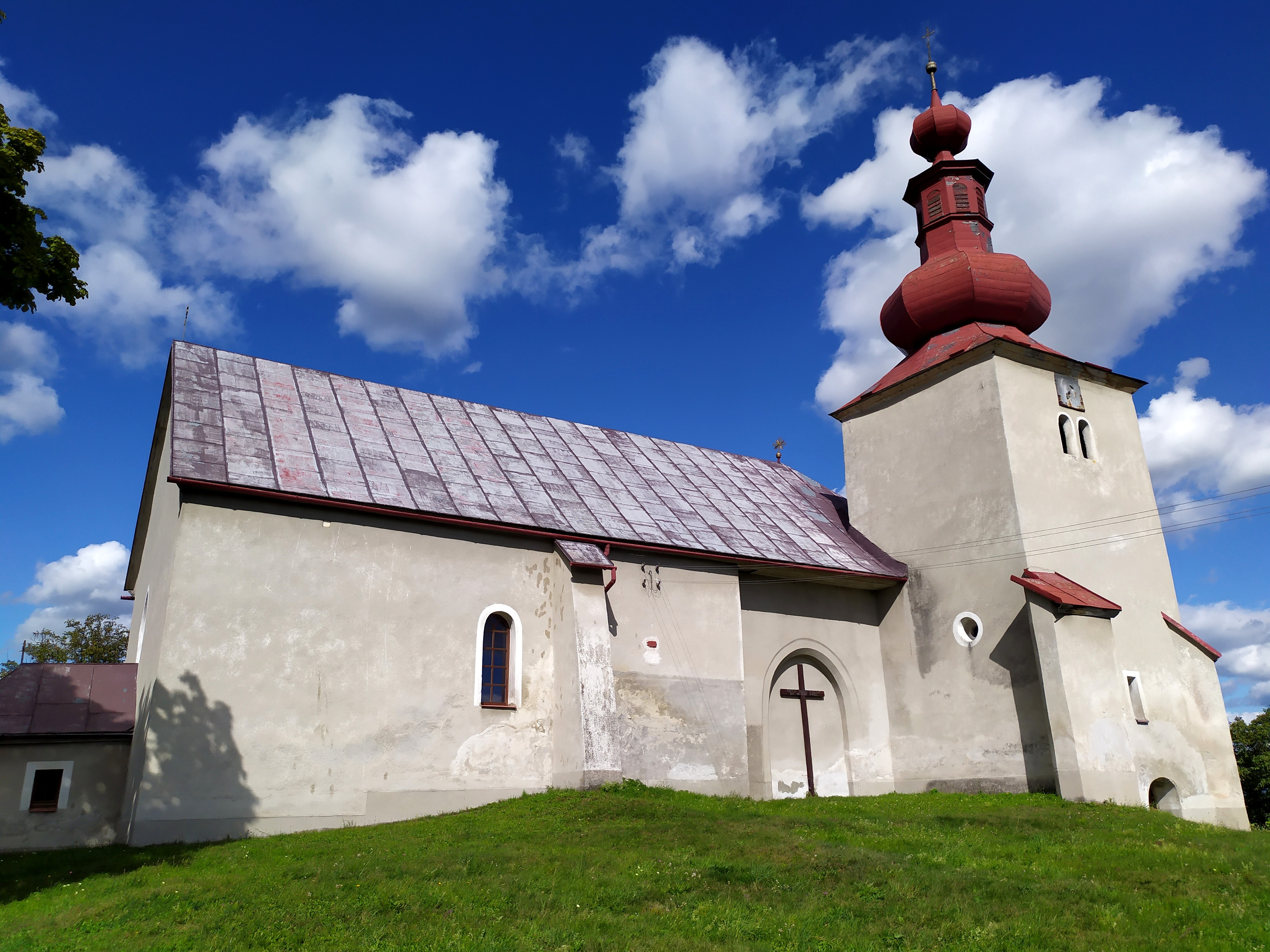
- All Saints Church

- Flag Coat of arms

- Location of Slovenské Pravno in the Žilina Region Location of Slovenské Pravno in Slovakia
- Coordinates: 48.92°N 18.77°E
- Country: Slovakia
- Region: Žilina Region
- District: Turčianske Teplice District
- First mentioned: 1113

Area
  - Total: 17.16 km^{2} (6.63 sq mi)
- Elevation: 494 m (1,621 ft)

Population (2025)
  - Total: 880
- Time zone: UTC+1 (CET)
  - Summer (DST): UTC+2 (CEST)
- Postal code: 382 2
- Area code: +421 43
- Vehicle registration plate (until 2022): RK
- Website: obecslovenskepravno.sk

Slovenské Pravno (Hungarian: Tótpróna, German: Windischproben) is a village and municipality in Turčianske Teplice District in the Žilina Region of northern central Slovakia.

== History ==
In historical records the village was first mentioned in 1113. Before the establishment of independent Czechoslovakia in 1918, it was part of Turóc County within the Kingdom of Hungary. From 1939 to 1945, it was part of the Slovak Republic.

== Population ==
Population statistic (10 years)
Year	1995	2005	2015	2025
Count	968	946	930	880
Difference		−2.27%	−1.69%	−5.37%

Population statistic
Year	2024	2025
Count	878	880
Difference		+0.22%

It has a population of 880 people (31 December 2025).

=== Ethnicity ===
Census 2021 (1+ %)
Ethnicity	Number	Fraction
Slovak	885	99.32%
Total	891	

In year 2021 was 891 people by ethnicity 885 as Slovak, 6 as Not found out, 4 as Czech, 3 as Polish, 3 as Hungarian, 3 as Other, 2 as German, 1 as Romani, 1 as Russian and 1 as Bulgarian.

Note on population: The difference values of population numbers in the table "Population statistic" and in the sections "Ethnicity" & "Religion" is caused by the use of various statistical methods.

=== Religion ===
Census 2021 (1+ %)
Religion	Number	Fraction
Evangelical Church	358	40.18%
Roman Catholic Church	304	34.12%
None	209	23.46%
Greek Catholic Church	13	1.46%
Total	891	

In year 2021 was 891 people by religion 358 from Evangelical Church, 304 from Roman Catholic Church, 209 from None, 13 from Greek Catholic Church, 3 from Not found out, 2 from Ad hoc movements, 1 from Jehovah's Witnesses and 1 from United Methodist Church.

== Sights ==
- Rococo manor house built in 1754

== Geography ==
The municipality lies at an altitude of 494 metres (1,621 ft) and covers an area of 17.16 km^{2} (6.63 sq mi) (2025).
