= No. 311 (Czechoslovak) Squadron RAF =

Defunct flying squadron of the Royal Air Force

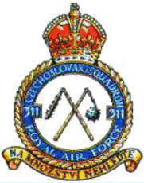
- Badge of № 311 Squadron RAF
- Active: 29 July 1940 – 15 February 1946
- Country: United Kingdom
- Allegiance: (Czech Republic) Czechoslovak National Liberation Committee
- Branch: Royal Air Force
- Role: Bomber, maritime patrol, transport
- Nickname: Czechoslovak
- Mottos: (Czech): Na množství nehleďte ("Never regard their numbers", Hussite battle cry)

Insignia
- Squadron badge: A thresher and a morning star in saltire, the halves fracted.
- Squadron codes: KX (July 1940 – April 1942); PP (1945 – February 1946)

Aircraft flown
- Bomber: Vickers Wellington; Consolidated Liberator

No. 311 (Czechoslovak) Squadron RAF was a Czechoslovak-manned bomber squadron of the Royal Air Force in the Second World War. It was the RAF's only Czechoslovak-manned medium and heavy bomber squadron. It suffered the worst losses of any Czechoslovak formation in the RAF. In the Second World War 511 Czechoslovaks serving in Allied air forces were killed. Of these 273 (53 per cent) died while serving with 311 Squadron.

After the end of the war, 311 Squadron was disbanded as an RAF unit and became the 6 letecká divize ("6th Air Division") of the reformed Czechoslovak Air Force.

== History ==
=== The crew ===
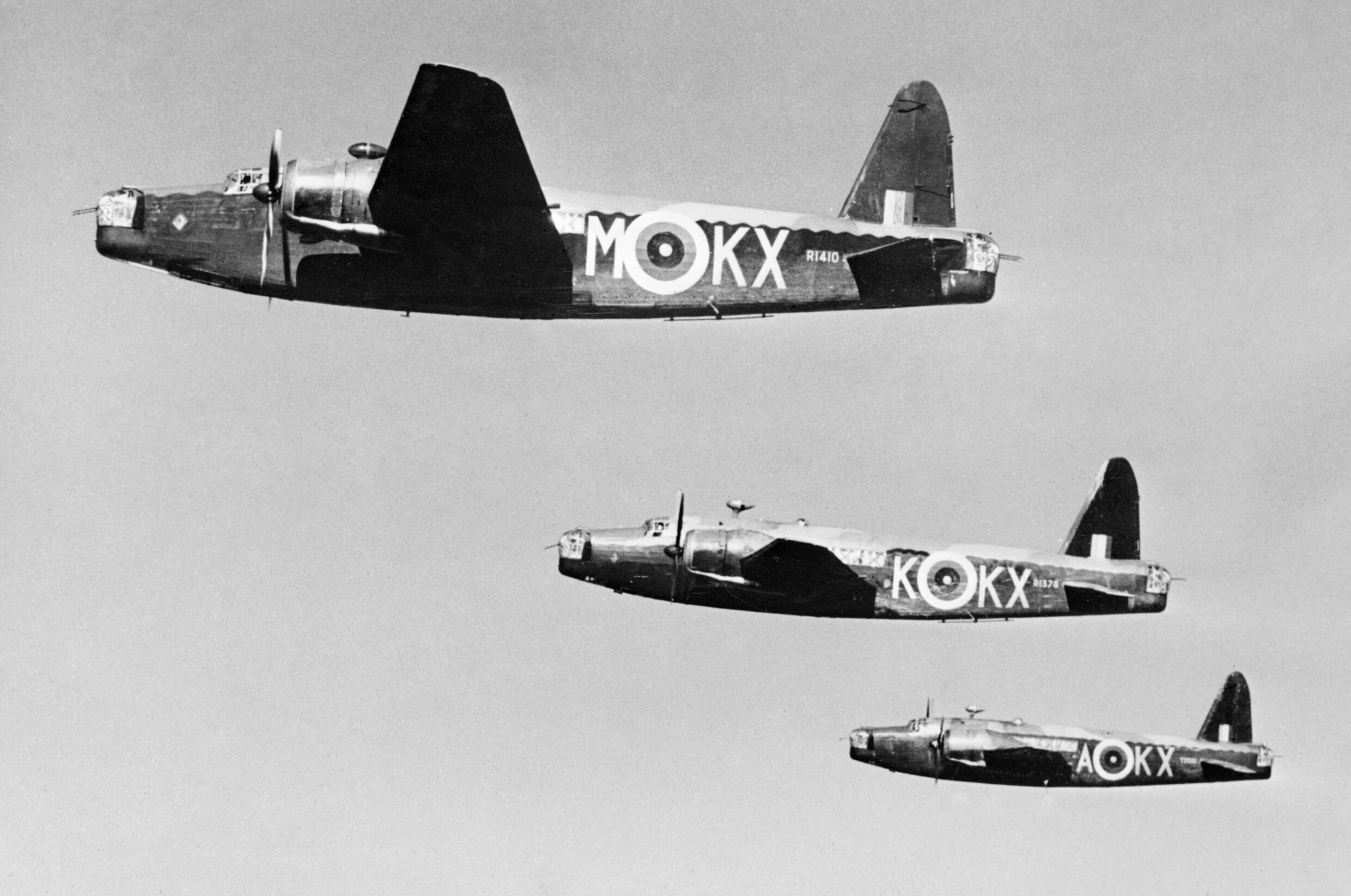
Three 311 Squadron Wellington Mk IC medium bombers over Norfolk in March 1941

The squadron was formed at RAF Honington in Suffolk on 29 July 1940, RAF records give the official date as 2 August. It was crewed mostly by Czechoslovaks who had escaped from German-occupied Europe. Some were airmen who had trained with the Czechoslovak Air Force, escaped to France, served in the French Air Force in the Battle of France and then been evacuated to Britain. Others were soldiers who had served in Czechoslovak Army units in the Battle of France, been evacuated and then volunteered to transfer to the RAF Volunteer Reserve to serve in 311 Squadron. Among the squadron personnel there was also significant number of civilians without previous military service, mostly the jewish refugees from Czechoslovakia (the percentage of Jews within the Czechoslovak units in United Kingdom is estimated at 22%). As the war progressed the losses were supplemented also by British and Commonwealth volunteers.

=== Service within Bomber Command ===
The squadron was equipped initially with Vickers Wellington Mark I medium bombers, which were soon succeeded by the improved Wellington Marks IA and IC. From 16 September 1940 the squadron was based at RAF East Wretham in Norfolk as part of 3 Group of Bomber Command. The group's commanding officer was Air Vice-Marshal John Baldwin who said that 311 Squadron "put up a wonderful show" and had "the finest navigators in Bomber Command". On 18 January 1941 HM King George VI and his consort Queen Elizabeth visited the squadron at East Wretham.

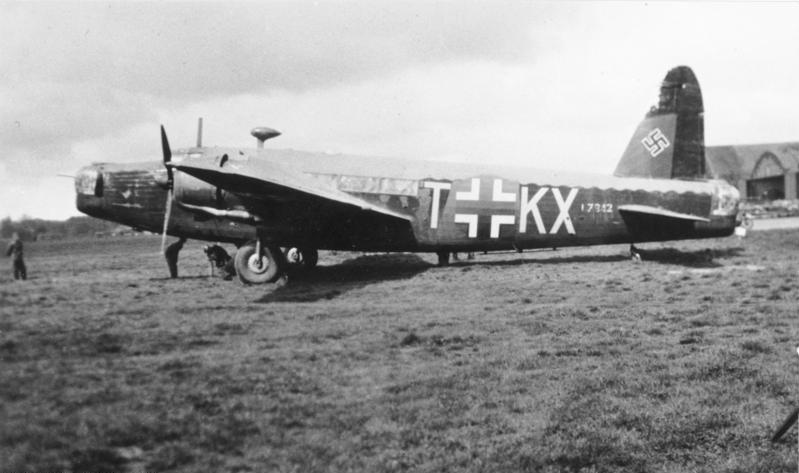
Wellington Mk IC L7842 after being captured in 1941. Its RAF roundels had been replaced with German crosses, but at this stage it still carried its RAF number and call sign.

On 6 February 1941 six of the squadron's Wellington Mk IC aircraft took part in a raid on Boulogne-sur-Mer in German-occupied France. On the return flight one aircraft, serial L7842, code KX-T, suffered navigation problems. Then it ran low on fuel, its commander Pilot Officer František Cigoš mistakenly judged that they were over England and he landed at Flers in northern France. Both the aircraft and its crew were captured. The Luftwaffe repainted it in German markings and transferred it to its Erprobungsstelle (experimental and test facility) at Rechlin–Lärz Airfield in Mecklenburg.

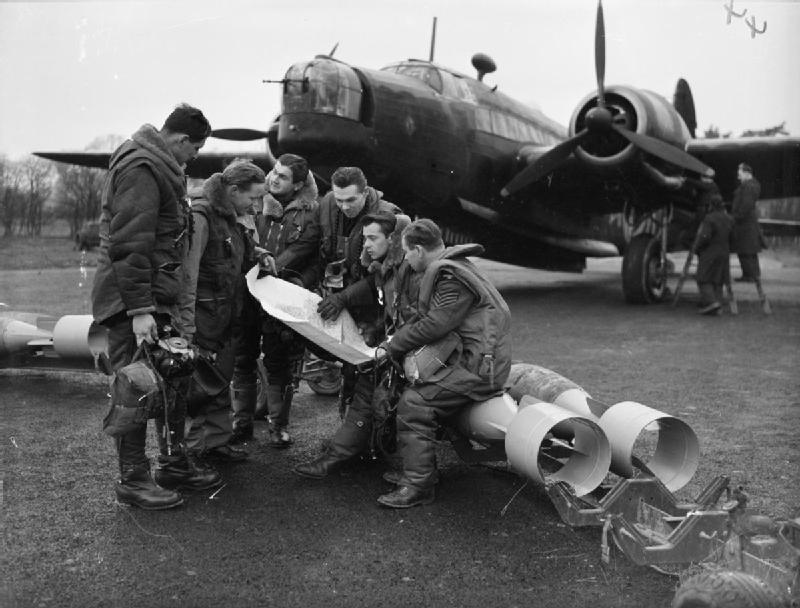
A 311 Squadron flight crew with their Wellington bomber at RAF East Wretham in Norfolk

On 20 June 1941 the squadron gave a dinner for the President of the Czechoslovak government-in-exile, Edvard Beneš. Other guests included Foreign Minister Jan Masaryk and Defence Minister, General Antonín Hasal-Nižborský. The squadron was with Bomber Command for 19 months. In that time it flew 1,029 sorties, attacked 77 targets, dropped 2,492,600 lb (1,130,600 kg) of explosive bombs and 95,438 incendiary bombs. It attacked targets in Germany, Italy, and occupied Belgium, France and the Netherlands. Its most frequent targets were Cologne, Hamburg and Kiel in Germany and Dunkirk, Brest and Boulogne in France. The squadron deployed 318 airmen formed into 53 aircrew. 94 were killed on operations and 34 were captured, a loss rate of more than 40 per cent. Unlike crews drawn from Britain or the Commonwealth nations, there were no Czechoslovak replacement crews arriving to fill the ranks of the lost. To keep the squadron functional, it would have to be put to a different use.

=== Service within Coastal Command ===
At the end of April 1942 the squadron was transferred from Bomber Command to Coastal Command to undertake maritime patrols. It moved to RAF Aldergrove in Northern Ireland on 28 April and began maritime patrol training on 1 May. The squadron was made part of No. 19 Group RAF, moved to RAF Talbenny in Wales on 12 June and undertook its first anti-submarine patrol on 30 June. Its Wellingtons lacked air to surface vessel (ASV) radar but despite this between June 1942 and April 1943 the squadron achieved the highest success rate of any Coastal Command squadron.

Throughout July and August the squadron's Wellingtons remained in night bomber Temperate Land Scheme camouflage, dark green and dark earth above and black below. This was unsuitable for maritime patrols, but not until September 1942 were the aircraft repainted in Coastal Command's Temperate Sea Scheme, dark slate grey and extra dark sea grey above, and white below.

In April 1943 the squadron was partly re-equipped with five Wellington Mark X aircraft. This could carry two torpedoes or 3,999 lb (1,814 kg) of bombs but it was primarily a Bomber Command variant, not designed for maritime patrol work. Air Vice-Marshal Karel Janoušek, Inspector-General of the Czechoslovak Air Force, eventually convinced the British Air Ministry to re-equip the squadron with B-24 Liberator 4-engined heavy bombers, as these had radar and a longer range, both of which made them more suitable for maritime patrols. Conversion training began on 25 May and continued until August. On 26 May 1943 the squadron moved to RAF Beaulieu in Hampshire. On 4 August it celebrated its third anniversary. Guests again included President Beneš and Foreign Minister Masaryk. They included also General Sergej Ingr, who had succeeded General Hasal-Nižborský as Defence Minister, and the head of Coastal Command, Air Marshal John Slessor.

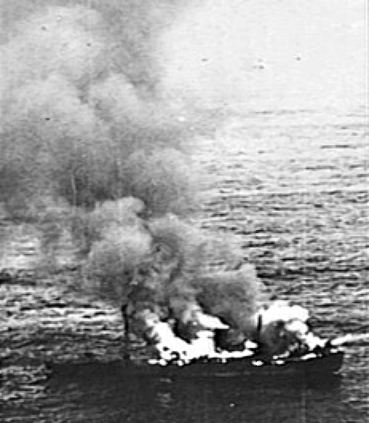
The German blockade runner Alsterufer burning after being attacked by Plt Off Oldřich Doležal's Liberator V

On 21 August 1943 the squadron began maritime patrols with Liberator GR Mk V aircraft and continued anti-submarine work but now over the Bay of Biscay. On 10 November Liberator BZ774/D, led by Flight Sergeant Otto Žanta, attacked U-966 with RP-3 rocket projectiles off the Galician coast. The submarine ran aground and her crew abandoned her. On 27 December 1943 Liberator BZ796/H, led by Pilot Officer Oldřich Doležal, attacked the German blockade runner Alsterufer in the Bay of Biscay. Doležal's crew set the cargo ship on fire with five RPs and a 500 lb (230 kg) bomb and she sank the next day.

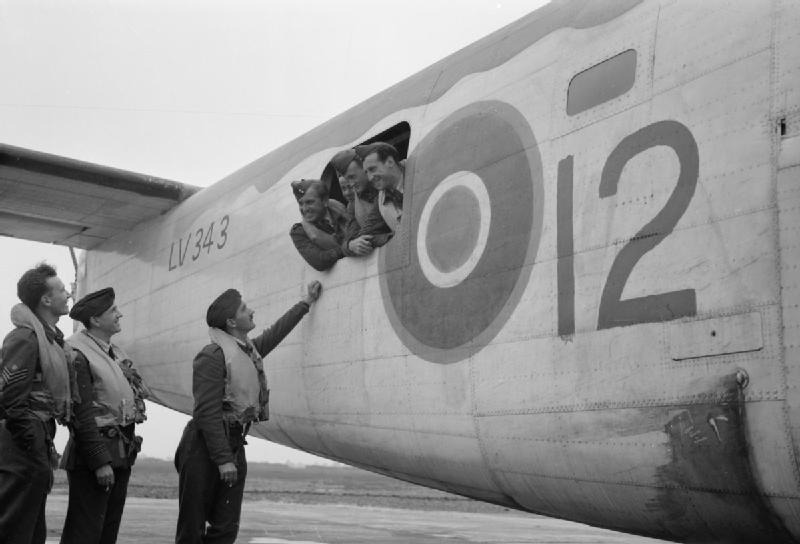
The crew of a Liberator IIIA, LV343, at RAF Beaulieu in Hampshire in July 1943

In February 1944 the squadron was re-equipped with nine Liberator C Mk VI aircraft. On 23 February it moved to RAF Predannack in Cornwall. On 24 June Liberator FL961/O led by Flying Officer Jan Vella, along with the Tribal-class destroyers HMS Eskimo and HMCS Haida, attacked and sank U-971 just west of the English Channel.

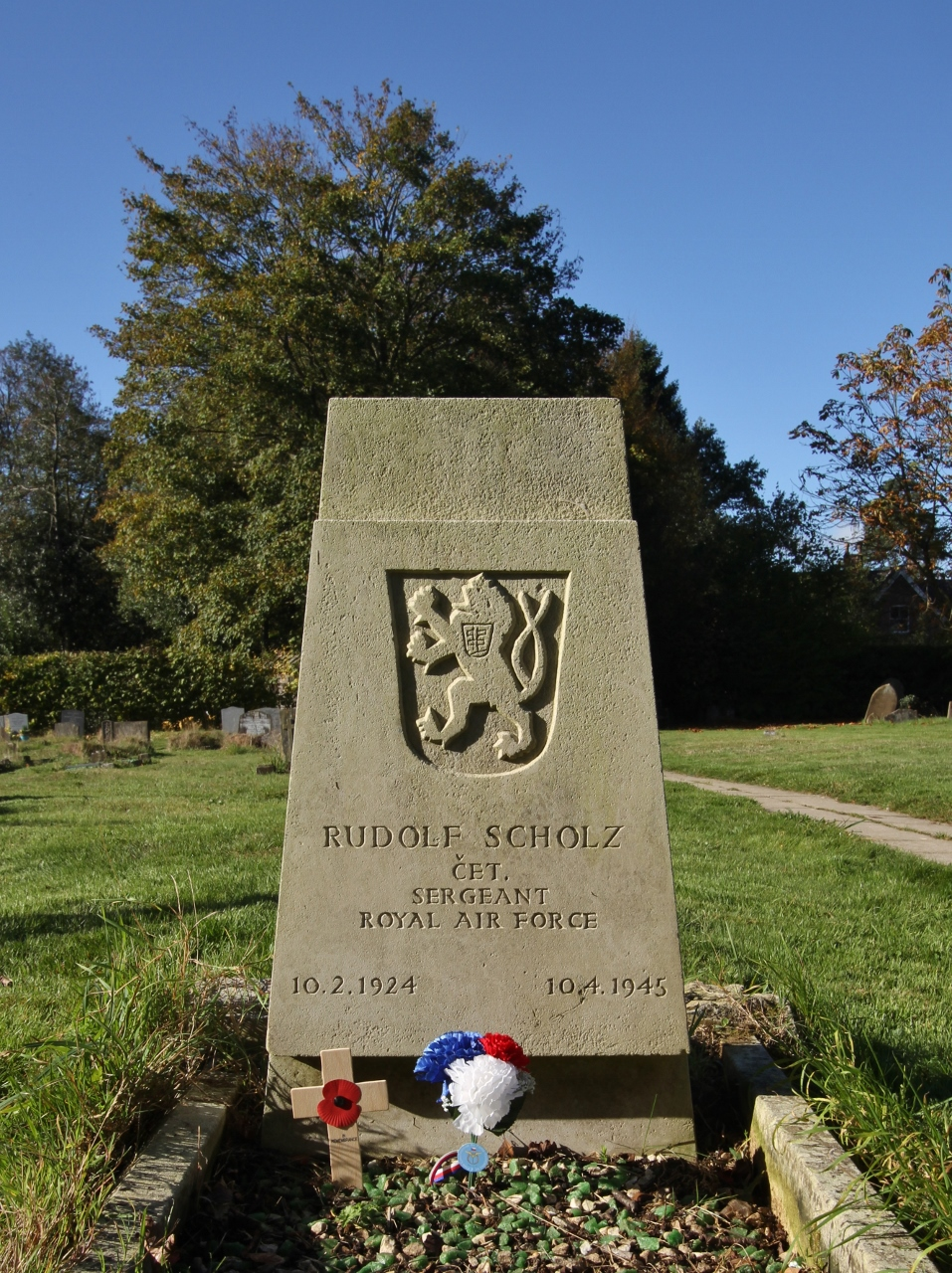
Grave of Sgt Rudolf Scholz in St John's parish churchyard, Stoke Row, Oxfordshire. Sholz was the flight engineer of Liberator IV EV995 when it crashed on the beach at Tain, Ross-shire, Scotland, on 10 April 1945. Six of its crew were killed and three injured.

On 7 August 1944 the squadron transferred to RAF Tain in Scotland and its area of operations changed from the Bay of Biscay and Western Approaches to the North Sea. In September its rôle was changed from day to night anti-submarine patrols. On 27 October Fleet Air Arm aircraft from HMS Implacable damaged U-1060, forcing her to run aground on the coast of German-occupied Norway. Two days later two 311 Squadron Liberators, FL949/KX-Y led by Flying Officer Josef Pavelka and BZ723/KX-H led by Squadron leader Alois Šedivý, damaged the grounded submarine with salvos of RPs. Later two Handley Page Halifax heavy bombers of 502 Squadron finished off U-1060 with depth charges. In February 1945 the squadron was re-equipped, this time with Liberator C Mk VI aircraft that carried anti-submarine Leigh Lights. In March the squadron took part in the "Chilli-II" and "Chilli-III" raids on German submarine training areas in the Baltic.

Number 311 Squadron was with Coastal Command for 38 months, in which time it flew 2,111 sorties. By the end of the war 247 of its men had been killed, either in combat or in accidents. Thirty-three of its members were released from German prisoner-of-war camps. One prisoner, Pilot Officer Arnošt Valenta, was murdered by the Gestapo in March 1944 for taking part in the Great Escape from Stalag Luft III.

=== Peacetime transport ===
After the End of World War II in Europe, on 26 May 1945 the Czechoslovak government-in-exile formed the Letecká dopravní skupina ("Air Transport Group"), and recruited most of its personnel from 311 Squadron. Its initial aircraft were two Avro Anson C XII aircraft bought from the RAF. On 12 June 1945 the unit began flights to Ruzyně Airport, Prague. By October the Letecká dopravní skupina had also acquired a number of Siebel Si 204D aircraft seized from Germany as war reparations.

On 25 June 1945 the remainder of 311 Squadron was transferred to 301 Wing, RAF Transport Command. It too flew transport flights to Ruzyně Airport, the first being on 30 July from RAF Manston in Kent, where the squadron was based from 3 August. On 21 August the squadron moved to Ruzynĕ. The squadron first transferred military equipment and personnel from Britain to Czechoslovakia and then repatriated Czechoslovak civilians. Czechoslovak runways were found to be unsuitable for Liberators and in December 1945 all those of 311 squadron were returned to Britain landing at RAF Valley in Wales. The squadron was officially disbanded as an RAF unit at RAF Milltown in Moray, Scotland on 15 February 1946. Most of its personnel had transferred to the Czechoslovak Air Force in August 1945 and in Czechoslovakia the unit was officially disbanded on 15 January 1946 but its personnel were not officially discharged from the RAF until 30 June 1946.

On 15 January 1946 311 Squadron became the Czechoslovak 6 letecká divize ("6th Air Division") at Havlíčkův Brod in southeastern Bohemia. In May it was divided into Letecký pluk 24 and Letecký pluk 25 ("24th and 25th Air Regiments"). Letecký pluk 24 was given the name Biskajsky ("Biscay") and initially equipped with de Havilland Mosquito FB Mk VI fighter-bombers. Letecký pluk 25 was given the name Atlantický ("Atlantic") and equipped with Petlyakov Pe-2FT aircraft.

== Squadron codes ==
This squadron displayed the squadron code letters "KX" and later "PP" on its Wellingtons and "PP" on its Liberators.

== Commanding officers ==
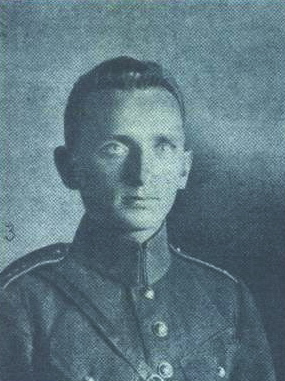
Karel Toman-Mareš as a young Czechoslovak Air Force officer in 1929. He commanded 311 Squadron from July 1940 until March 1941.

From	To	Name
July 1940	November 1940	W/Cdr John Griffiths, DFC
July 1940	March 1941	W/Cdr Karel Toman-Mareš
1941	1941	Sqn Ldr Percy Charles Pickard, DFC
March 1941	July 1941	W/Cdr Josef Schejbal
July 1941	April 1942	W/Cdr Josef Ocelka, DFC
April 1942	January 1943	W/Cdr Josef Šnajdr, DFC
January 1943	August 1943	W/Cdr Jindřich Breitcetl, DFC
August 1943	January 1944	W/Cdr Vladimír Nedvěd, MBE, DFC
January 1944	August 1944	W/Cdr Josef Šejbl, DFC
August 1944	February 1946	W/Cdr Jan Kostohryz, DSO

== Squadron bases ==
Period	Name
29 July 1940 – 16 September 1940	RAF Honington
16 September 1940 – 28 April 1942	RAF East Wretham
28 April 1942 – 12 June 1942	RAF Aldergrove
12 June 1942 – 26 May 1943	RAF Talbenny
26 May 1943 – 23 February 1944	RAF Beaulieu
23 February 1944 – 7 August 1944	RAF Predannack
7 August 1944 – 6 August 1945	RAF Tain
6 August 1945 – 21 August 1945	RAF Manston
21 August 1945 – 15 February 1946	Ruzyně Airport, Prague

== Aircraft operated ==
Dates	Aircraft	Variant	Notes
1940–43	Vickers Wellington	I IA; IC; X	Twin-engined medium bomber
1943; 1943–45; 1945–46	Consolidated B-24 Liberator	IIIA; V VI	Four-engined heavy bomber

== Notable incidents ==
=== 1942 Wellington crash ===
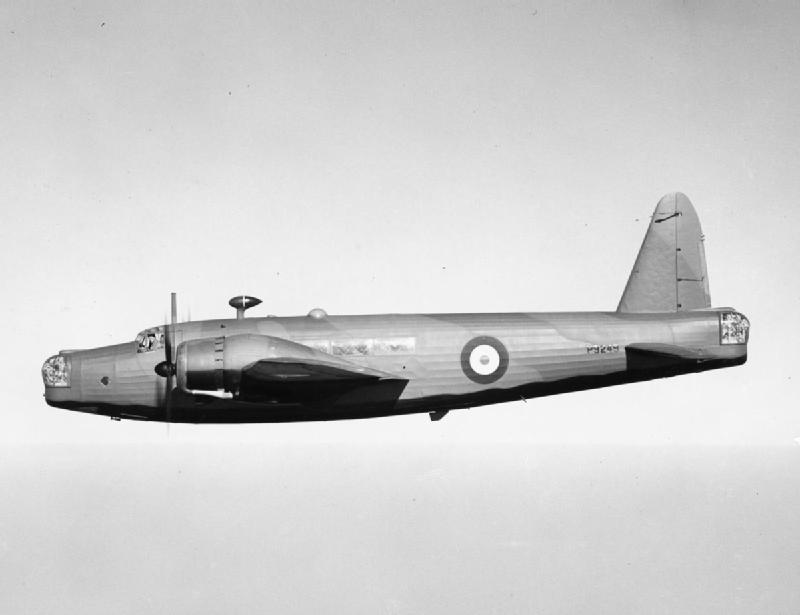
A Vickers Wellington IC. This is the same version of Wellington as the one from 311 Squadron that crashed at South Ruislip in 1942.

On 18 October 1942 Wellington 1C aircraft of 311 Squadron crashed and burst into flames at South Ruislip, Middlesex, on approach to RAF Northolt. The aircraft was en route to a debriefing and was carrying nine passengers as well as its usual crew of six. Everyone aboard was killed, along with four children and two mothers on the ground.

=== 1943 Tragic August ===
Shortly after the 311 Squadron was rearmed to Liberator aircraft a series of loses and accidents followed, known also as "Tragic August". On 21 August the aircraft No. BZ780 (O) of squadron commander W/Cdr Jindřich Breitcetl was shot down with the complete crew missing on sea. On 29 August the aircraft No. BZ775 (G) of Sgt. Adolf Musálek crashed upon take-of with the complete crew dead. On 30 August the aircraft No. BZ785 (L) of F/Lt Emil Palichleb crashed while training evasive maneuvers with all but one crew members dead. Within few days the 311 Squadron have lost 3 aircraft and 23 airmen.

=== 1945 Liberator crash ===
On 5 October 1945 a Liberator GR.VI aircraft of 311 Squadron suffered an engine fire, crashed and burst into flames in a field at Elvetham, near Hartley Wintney, Hampshire. Five minutes earlier it had taken off from RAF Blackbushe on a flight to Ruzyně Airport, Prague. The aircraft was transporting former Czechoslovak military personnel, as well as former refugees back to Czechoslovakia. All 23 people aboard were killed: five crew, 17 passengers and one stowaway. The passengers included ten women and five young children, the latter ranging from 18 months to three years old. The stowaway was a crew member-radio operator Edita Sedláková previously forced to give her space to VIP passenger Marína Paulínyová.

== Legacy ==
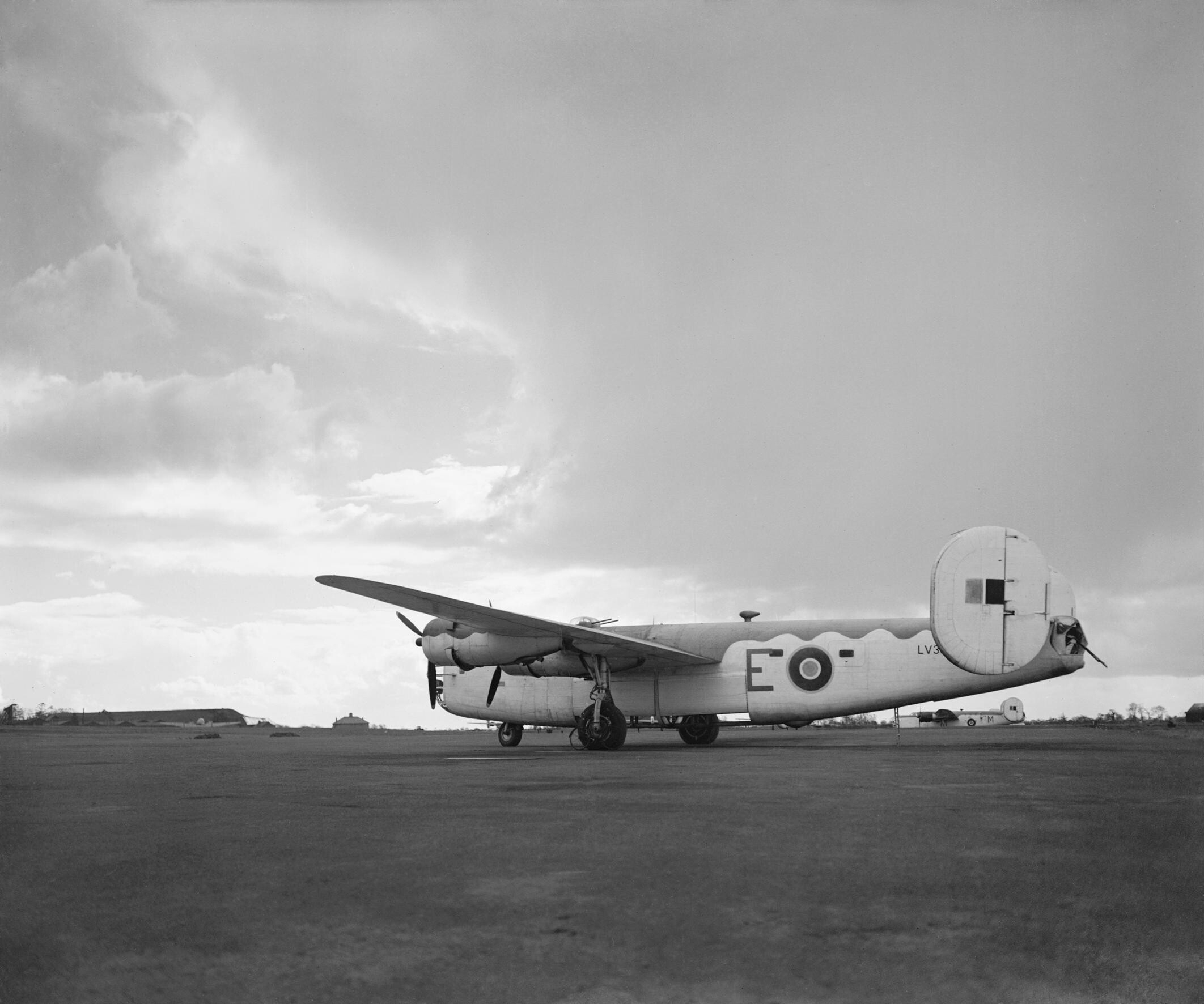
A Consolidated Liberator GR.VI of No. 200 Squadron RAF. This is the same version of B-24 as the one from 311 Squadron that crashed at Elvetham in 1945.

In 1964, 311 Squadron veteran Richard Husmann, writing as Filip Jánský, published his novel Nebeští jezdci, portraying the lives of Czech and Polish airmen in the wartime RAF. In 1968 a film based on the book was released, having been made the previous year around Klecany military airfield north of Prague. In 1969 Hodder & Stoughton published an English translation of the book as Riders in the Sky.

In 1999 the Air Café commemorating No. 311 Squadron RAF opened in Brno, South Moravia. It is in the early 17th-century Dietrichstein Palace, which also houses the Moravian Museum. The café exhibits a small collection of memorabilia connected with the Czechoslovak-manned squadron.

In February 2016 the 438th Air Expeditionary Advisory Squadron, 438th Air Expeditionary Advisory Group, USAF, Kabul, Afghanistan, was renamed 311th Air Expeditionary Advisory Squadron, to follow in the traditions of the squadron, under Czech Air Force command. This 311 Squadron was disbanded in February 2019.

== See also ==
- Charles Pickard
- Jindřich Svoboda
- Arnošt Valenta
- Tomáš Lom
- List of Royal Air Force aircraft squadrons
