= Penycwm =

Village in Pembrokeshire, Wales

Coordinates: 51.87°N 5.13°W

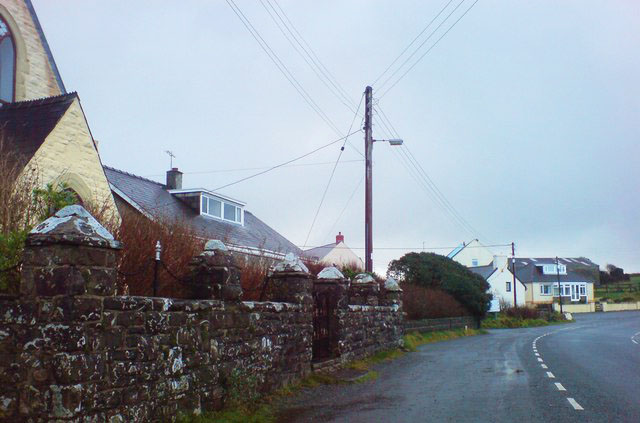
- Penycwm and A487 road

- Location within Pembrokeshire
- OS grid reference: SM849234
- Community: Brawdy
- Principal area: Pembrokeshire
- Country: Wales
- Sovereign state: United Kingdom
- Police: Dyfed-Powys
- Fire: Mid and West Wales
- Ambulance: Welsh

Penycwm (Welsh for "Head of the valley") is a small settlement on the A487 road near Newgale, Pembrokeshire, Wales. It is part of the community (formerly civil parish) of Brawdy. At the other end of a valley to the coast is Penycwm beach, also known as Pwll March. Penycwm is close to the popular Newgale Sands, on the Pembrokeshire Coast Path and in the Pembrokeshire Coast National Park.

The village's Independent Chapel, built in Gothic style in stone in 1870, had become a private residence by 2004.

To the northeast is Llethr, an 18th and 19th house, owned by the Thomas family until 1823, but in a poor state of repair when inspected in 1993. The house is a Grade II listed building, as is the house's stable block. Penycwm was the location for the United Kingdom's first 5-star youth hostel.

== Climate ==
Climate data for Penycwm Youth Hostel (1991–2020)
| Month | Jan | Feb | Mar | Apr | May | Jun | Jul | Aug | Sep | Oct | Nov | Dec | Year |
|---|---|---|---|---|---|---|---|---|---|---|---|---|---|
| Mean daily maximum °C (°F) | 8.0 (46.4) | 7.9 (46.2) | 9.5 (49.1) | 11.8 (53.2) | 14.4 (57.9) | 16.7 (62.1) | 18.5 (65.3) | 18.0 (64.4) | 16.6 (61.9) | 13.6 (56.5) | 10.7 (51.3) | 8.7 (47.7) | 12.9 (55.2) |
| Mean daily minimum °C (°F) | 3.2 (37.8) | 3.0 (37.4) | 3.9 (39.0) | 5.2 (41.4) | 7.5 (45.5) | 10.2 (50.4) | 12.2 (54.0) | 12.5 (54.5) | 10.7 (51.3) | 8.6 (47.5) | 5.9 (42.6) | 4.0 (39.2) | 7.3 (45.1) |
| Average rainfall mm (inches) | 116.0 (4.57) | 87.3 (3.44) | 74.1 (2.92) | 70.3 (2.77) | 66.1 (2.60) | 70.5 (2.78) | 77.7 (3.06) | 96.0 (3.78) | 93.6 (3.69) | 132.5 (5.22) | 147.2 (5.80) | 136.2 (5.36) | 1,167.6 (45.97) |
| Mean monthly sunshine hours | 58.9 | 77.3 | 129.2 | 187.3 | 228.3 | 218.4 | 202.6 | 187.6 | 151.4 | 103.0 | 66.4 | 53.2 | 1,663.6 |
Source: Met Office
