= Brawdy =

Village, parish and community in Pembrokeshire, Wales

Brawdy: Welsh: Breudeth
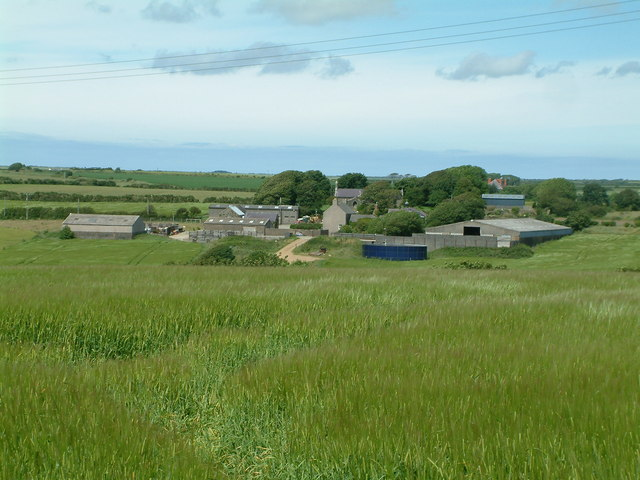
- Brawdy Farm

- Location within Pembrokeshire
- Population: 1,012 (2011)
- Community: Brawdy
- Principal area: Pembrokeshire
- Country: Wales
- Sovereign state: United Kingdom
- Post town: Haverfordwest
- Postcode district: SA62
- Dialling code: 01437
- Police: Dyfed-Powys
- Fire: Mid and West Wales
- Ambulance: Welsh
- UK Parliament: Mid and South Pembrokeshire
- Senedd Cymru – Welsh Parliament: Ceredigion Penfro
- List of places UK Wales Pembrokeshire 51.873611°N 5.113056°W Map of the community

Brawdy (Welsh: Breudeth) is a village, parish and community in Pembrokeshire, Wales.

== Etymology ==
The Welsh language name appears to be an archaic form of "Bridget" and the parish may originally have been Llanfreudeth. The English name is a corruption of the Welsh.

== Location ==
Brawdy is situated at the northeast corner of St Brides Bay. The southern half of the parish is in the Pembrokeshire Coast National Park. The parish has 4 km of coastline accessible throughout by the Pembrokeshire Coast Path.

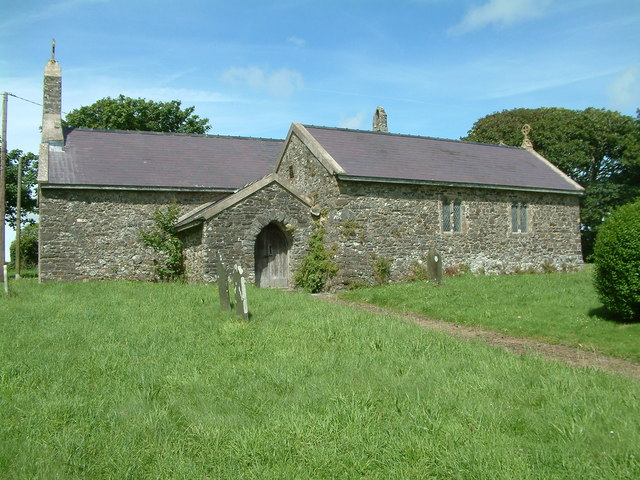
St David's church

The parish includes the villages of Penycwm 51°52′3″N 5°7′31″W and Newgale (Welsh: Niwgwl) 51°51′29″N 5°7′35″W, and the hamlets of Eweston (Welsh: Treŵen) 51°52′20″N 5°5′33″W, Tancredston (Welsh: Trebwrnallt) 51°53′38″N 5°4′47″W and Trefgarn Owen 51°53′14″N 5°5′55″W. The parish church of St David is a Grade II* listed building.

Together with the parishes of Llandeloy and Llanreithan, it constitutes the community of Brawdy, which had a census population of 611 in 2001, increasing to 1,012 at the 2011 census. With the community of Solva, it makes up the Pembrokeshire ward of Solva. There are 15 listed buildings in the community, including two churches.

The parish had an area of 2240 Hectares. Its census populations were: 572 (1801): 753 (1851): 467 (1901): 425 (1951): 798 (1981, of which around 400 were military). The percentage of Welsh speakers was 88% (1891): 72% (1931): 36% (1971). The Pembrokeshire language frontier, known as the Landsker Line, corresponds roughly with the southern boundary of the parish, and it has historically been more Welsh-speaking (excluding military personnel from the Royal Signals Regiment who are based in the former RN and RAF Station). This is less so today, the 2011 census showed 19.1% of the population could speak Welsh, a fall from 32.2% in 2001.

During the second half of the 20th century, it was home to RAF Station Brawdy, then the large Fleet Air Arm base then back to RNAS Brawdy, later RAF Station and Army Barracks.

== Climate ==
Climate data for Brawdy (102m elevation) 1991–2020
Month	Jan	Feb	Mar	Apr	May	Jun	Jul	Aug	Sep	Oct	Nov	Dec	Year
Record high °C (°F)	11.9 (53.4)	13.8 (56.8)	16.9 (62.4)	23.0 (73.4)	26.2 (79.2)	29.7 (85.5)	30.0 (86.0)	29.9 (85.8)	25.2 (77.4)	21.1 (70.0)	16.2 (61.2)	13.8 (56.8)	30.0 (86.0)
Mean daily maximum °C (°F)	8.0 (46.4)	7.9 (46.2)	9.5 (49.1)	11.8 (53.2)	14.4 (57.9)	16.7 (62.1)	18.5 (65.3)	18.0 (64.4)	16.6 (61.9)	13.6 (56.5)	10.7 (51.3)	8.7 (47.7)	12.9 (55.2)
Daily mean °C (°F)	5.6 (42.1)	5.5 (41.9)	6.7 (44.1)	8.5 (47.3)	11.0 (51.8)	13.4 (56.1)	15.3 (59.5)	15.2 (59.4)	13.6 (56.5)	11.1 (52.0)	8.3 (46.9)	6.3 (43.3)	10.1 (50.2)
Mean daily minimum °C (°F)	3.2 (37.8)	3.0 (37.4)	3.9 (39.0)	5.2 (41.4)	7.5 (45.5)	10.2 (50.4)	12.2 (54.0)	12.5 (54.5)	10.7 (51.3)	8.6 (47.5)	5.9 (42.6)	4.0 (39.2)	7.3 (45.1)
Record low °C (°F)	−10.7 (12.7)	−8.4 (16.9)	−7.5 (18.5)	−4.0 (24.8)	−0.2 (31.6)	3.4 (38.1)	6.6 (43.9)	5.4 (41.7)	3.6 (38.5)	−0.9 (30.4)	−3.9 (25.0)	−5.2 (22.6)	−10.7 (12.7)
Average precipitation mm (inches)	116.0 (4.57)	87.3 (3.44)	74.1 (2.92)	70.4 (2.77)	66.1 (2.60)	70.5 (2.78)	77.7 (3.06)	96.0 (3.78)	93.6 (3.69)	132.5 (5.22)	147.2 (5.80)	136.2 (5.36)	1,167.6 (45.97)
Average precipitation days (≥ 1.0 mm)	16.2	12.5	12.6	10.3	9.7	9.9	9.8	11.1	11.4	16.1	16.1	15.6	151.4
Mean monthly sunshine hours	58.9	77.3	129.2	187.4	228.3	218.4	202.6	187.6	151.4	103.0	66.4	53.2	1,663.6
Source 1: Met Office (precipitation days 1981-2010)
Source 2: Starlings Roost Weather
