= 773 Naval Air Squadron =

Inactive flying squadron of the Royal Navy's Fleet Air Arm

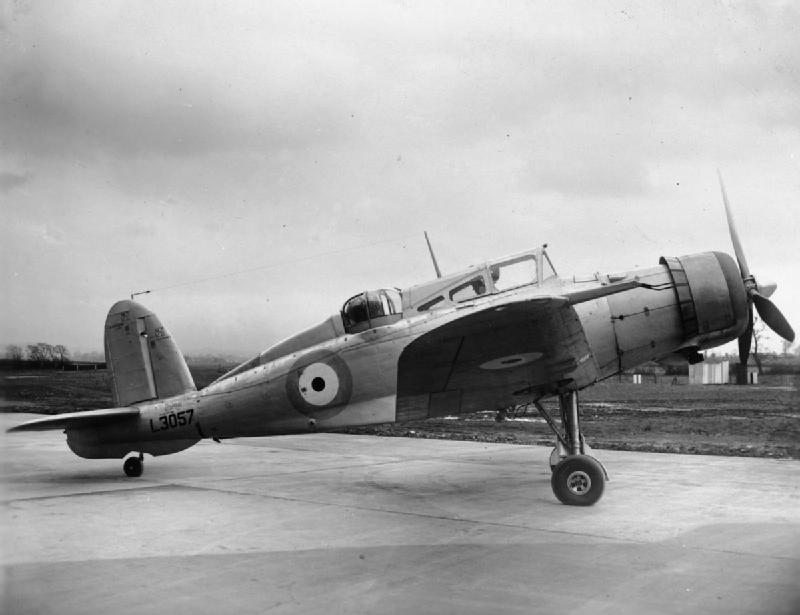
- Blackburn Roc; an example of the type used by 773 NAS
- Active: 1940–1944; 1945–1946; 1949; 1950; 1950–1951
- Disbanded: 31 March 1951
- Country: United Kingdom
- Branch: Royal Navy
- Type: Fleet Air Arm Second Line Squadron
- Role: Fleet Requirements Unit; Pilotless Aircraft Unit
- Size: Squadron
- Part of: Fleet Air Arm
- Home station: See Naval air stations section for full list.
- Aircraft: See Aircraft operated section for full list.

Insignia
- Identification Markings: R4A+ (all types 1940 - 1944); 103-106 (Sea Fury 1949); 510-515 (Seafire 1950)
- Fin Shore Code: LP (Sea Fury 1949); LP (Seafire 1950)

773 Naval Air Squadron (773 NAS) was a Fleet Air Arm (FAA) naval air squadron of the United Kingdom’s Royal Navy (RN) which was last active between September 1950 and March 1951. 773 Naval Air Squadron initially formed during June 1940, as a Fleet Requirements Unit in Bermuda, in support of ships on the North America and West Indies Station. It performed this role four almost four years and eventually disbanded, at Bermuda, in April 1944. The squadron reformed during June 1945 as a Service Trials Unit, at HMS Daedalus, RNAS Lee-on-Solent. Tasked with investigating pilotless aircraft as targets, it was known as the Pilotless Aircraft Unit (PAU). It moved to HMS Goldcrest II, RNAS Brawdy where it disbanded in September 1946. The squadron reformed at the start of 1949 as a Fleet Requirements Unit, out of 771 Naval Air Squadron, lasting around three months and repeated this at the start of 1950 and again at the end of 1950, into 1951.

== History ==
=== Fleet Requirements Unit (1940–1944) ===
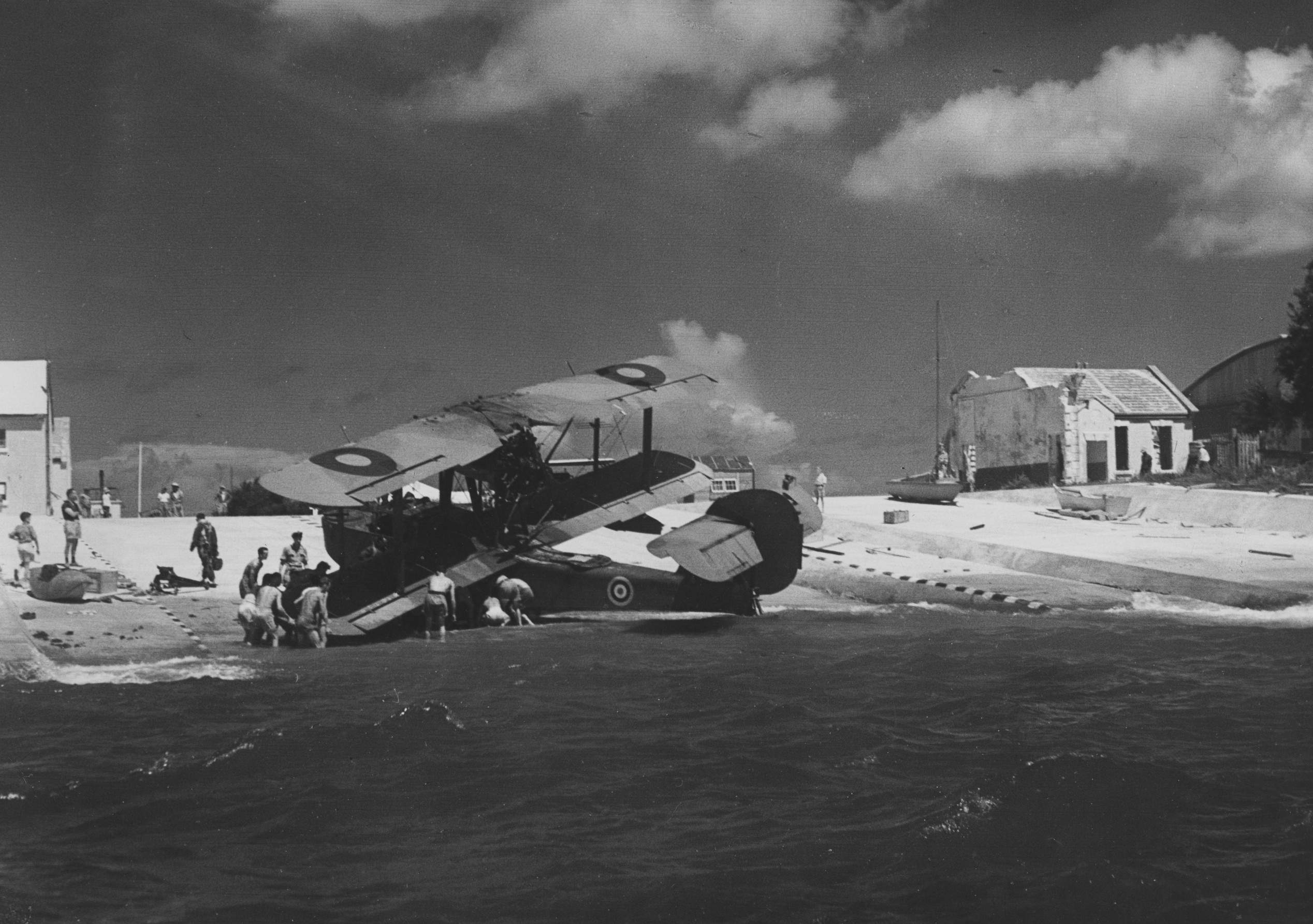
A Supermarine Walrus seaplane of the Fleet Air Arm being hauled ashore from the Great Sound at Royal Naval Air Station Bermuda at Boaz Island

As the waters around the Imperial fortress colony of Bermuda (the main base and Royal Naval Dockyard of the America and West Indies Station) became a working-up area for United States Navy (USN) and Royal Canadian Navy (RCN) vessels, as well as for lend-lease ex-USN vessels of the Royal Navy (RN), preparing to join the Battle of the Atlantic, Fleet Air Arm target tugs were based at Royal Naval Air Station Bermuda to assist in training anti-aircraft gunners afloat or ashore. 773 Fleet Requirements Unit was formed at Bermuda on the 3 June 1940, equipped with Blackburn Roc target tugs. These were normally meant to operate from carrier decks, and had retractable undercarriage. To operate from RNAS Bermuda, which was only able to handle flyingboats and floatplanes, they were fitted with floats. They towed targets for anti-aircraft gunnery practice by Allied vessels working-up at Bermuda, as well as by a USN anti-aircraft gunnery training centre operating on shore at Warwick Parish for the duration of the war. When the Kindley Air Force Base was the United States Army Air Force's Kindley Field (built under a 99-year free lease from the British Government on the understanding that it would be used jointly by the Royal Air Force establishment in Bermuda and Fleet Air Arm) became operational in 1943, the floats were removed from the Blackburn Roc aircraft, which thenceforth operated from the British end of the airfield as landplanes, being the first aircraft based there. 773 Fleet Requirements Unit disbanded on 25 April 1944.

=== Pilotless Aircraft Unit (1945–1946) ===
773 Naval Air Squadron next reformed at RNAS Lee-on-Solent (HMS Daedalus), Hampshire, on 1 June 1945, as a Service Trials Unit. It was tasked with the development of pilotless aircraft using American electronic equipment, as controlled targets. Known as the Pilotless Aircraft Unit (PAU), it moved to RNAS Brawdy (HMS Goldcrest), Pembrokeshire, Wales, on 29 March 1946. The squadron operated three Miles Martinet, M.50 Queen Martinet variant, an unmanned radio-controlled target drone aircraft, Avro Anson I, a twin-engined, multi-role aircraft and de Havilland Mosquito B.25, a twin-engined, bomber variant of the multirole combat aircraft.

Aircrew initially flew the Queen Martinet before it was put under radio control, then monitored the systems. The aircraft was designed to meet Air Ministry Specification Q.10/43, from an operational requirement for a radio-controlled target drone. Other squadron aircraft operated as a shepherd aircraft, while the Martinet was operated via radio control. 773 Naval Air Squadron disbanded on the 30 September 1946.

=== Fleet Requirements Unit (1949) ===
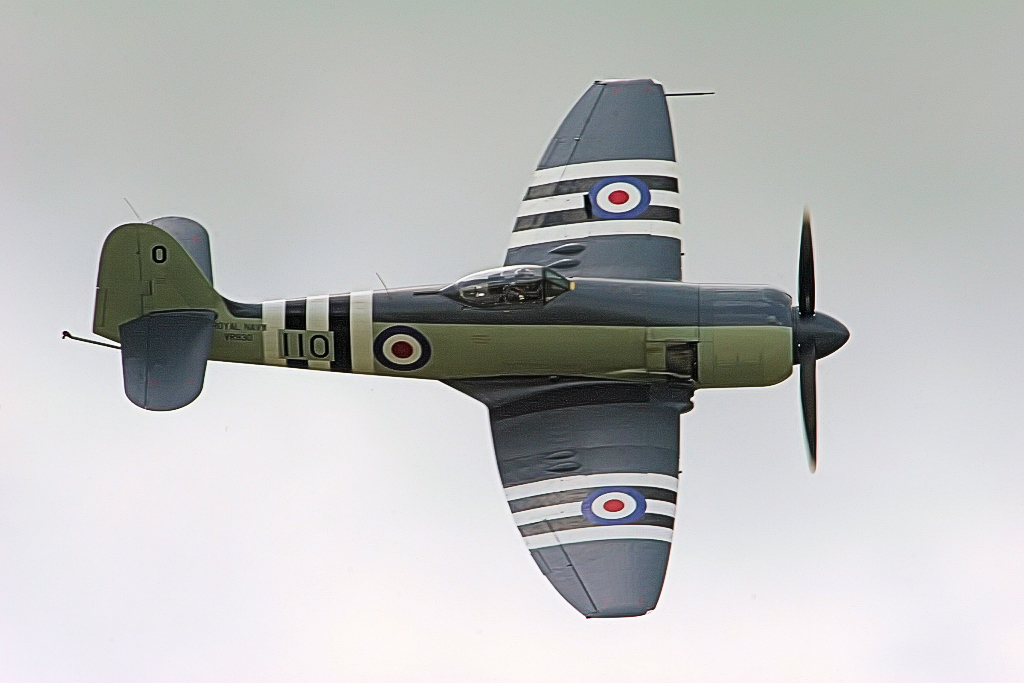
Hawker Sea Fury, an example of the type used by 773 NAS

773 Naval Air Squadron reformed out of 771 Naval Air Squadron, on 6 January 1949, as a Fleet Requirements Unit, at RNAS Lee-on-Solent (HMS Daedalus). It was tasked with supporting the needs of the Home Fleet during its Spring Cruise in the Western Mediterranean. On 27 January it embarked in the Colossus-class light fleet aircraft carrier, HMS Theseus, it disembarked its Miles Martinet target tug aircraft and Hawker Sea Fury fighter aircraft to R.N. Air Section Gibraltar, at RAF North Front, Gibraltar, on 5 February, operating for just over one month. From here it then embarked in the name ship of her class, HMS Implacable on 18 March, being disbanded and reabsorbed into 771 Naval Air Squadron on 31 March.

=== Fleet Requirements Unit (1950) ===
773 Naval Air Squadron next reformed, again out of 771 Naval Air Squadron at RNAS Lee-on-Solent (HMS Daedalus) as a Fleet Requirements Unit, on 4 January 1950 and much the same as the previous year, in support of the Home Fleet’s 1950 Spring Cruise. The squadron consisted five Miles Martinet target tug aircraft, six Supermarine Seafire, a navalised version of the Supermarine Spitfire fighter aircraft and two de Havilland Mosquito multirole combat aircraft. It moved to R.N. Air Section Gibraltar, from RNAS Lee-on-Solent, on 3 February 1950. The squadron again embarked in HMS Implacable until 31 March and also in the Colossus-class light fleet aircraft carrier, HMS Vengeance until 30 March, returning to RNAS Lee-on-Solent. It disbanded into 771 Naval Air Squadron, on return, on 31 March.

=== Fleet Requirements Unit (1950–1951) ===
On 1 September 1950, 773 Naval Air Squadron reformed again for this purpose, as a Fleet Requirements Unit out of 771 Naval Air Squadron, at RNAS Lee-on-Solent (HMS Daedalus). It moved to R.N. Air Section Gibraltar, at RAF North Front, on 14 September until 27 November, then returned to RNAS Lee-on-Solent. It then spent January to March 1951 back at Gibraltar, returning to RNAS Lee-on-Solent at the start of March and disbanded on 31 March 1951, merging back into 771 Naval Air Squadron.

== Aircraft operated ==
The squadron operated a variety of different aircraft and versions:

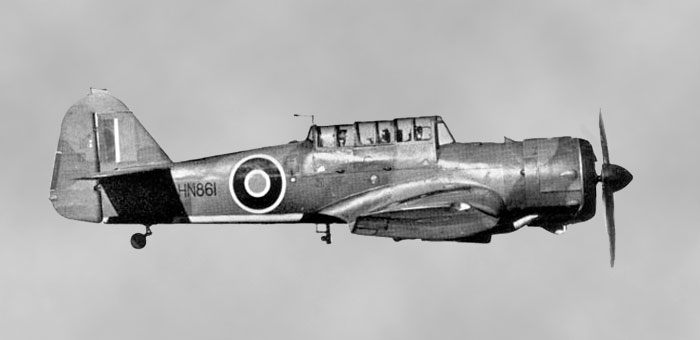
Miles Martinet TT Mk.I

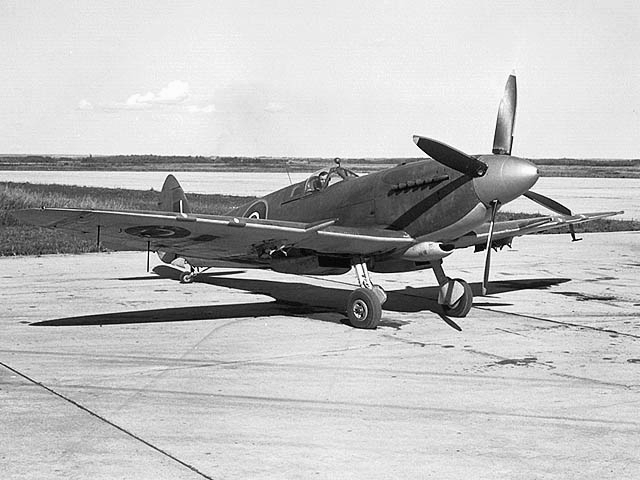
Supermarine Seafire Mk XV

- Fairey Swordfish I/FP torpedo bomber (May 1940 - April 1944)
- Supermarine Walrus amphibious maritime patrol aircraft (May 1940 - September 1943)
- Fairey Seafox (August 1940 - September 1941)
- Blackburn Roc fighter aircraft (September 1941 - April 1944)
- Blackburn Roc FP fighter aircraft (December 1941 - July 1943)
- Avro Anson Mk XII multirole communications aircraft (September - November 1945)
- Avro Anson Mk I multirole trainer aircraft (1945-1946)
- de Havilland Mosquito B Mk.25 bomber (1945-1946)
- Miles M.50 Queen Martinet unmanned radio-controlled target drone (July - August 1946)
- Hawker Sea Fury FB.11 fighter aircraft (January - March 1949)
- Miles Martinet TT.Mk I target tug (January - March 1949), (January - March 1950), (September 1950 - February 1951)
- de Havilland Mosquito FB Mk.VI fighter bomber (January - March 1950)
- Supermarine Seafire F Mk XV fighter aircraft (January - March 1950)

== Naval air stations and aircraft carriers ==
773 Naval Air Squadron operated from a number of naval air stations of the Royal Navy, both in the UK and overseas and a number of Royal Navy aircraft carriers:

1940 - 1944

- Royal Naval Air Station Bermuda, Bermuda, (3 June 1940 - 25 April 1944)
- disbanded - (25 April 1944)

1945 - 1946

- Royal Naval Air Station Lee-on-Solent (HMS Daedalus), Hampshire, (1 June 1945 - 29 March 1946
- Royal Naval Air Station Brawdy (HMS Goldcrest), Pembrokeshire, (29 March 1946 - 30 September 1946)
- disbanded - (30 September 1946)

1949

- Royal Naval Air Station Lee-on-Solent (HMS Daedalus), Hampshire, (6 January 1949 - 27 January 1949)
- HMS Theseus (27 January 1949 - 5 February 1949)
- RN Air Section Gibraltar, Gibraltar, (5 February 1949 - 18 March 1949)
- HMS Implacable (18 March 1949 - 25 March 1949)
- Royal Naval Air Station Lee-on-Solent (HMS Daedalus), Hampshire, (25 March 1949 - 31 March 1949)
- disbanded - (31 March 1949)

1950

- Royal Naval Air Station Lee-on-Solent (HMS Daedalus), Hampshire, (4 January 1950 - 3 February 1950)
- passage (3 February 1950 - 8 February 1950)
- RN Air Section Gibraltar, Gibraltar, (8 February 1950 - 30 March 1950)
  - HMS Implacable (Detachment 26 - 31 March 1950)
  - HMS Vengeance (Detachment 26 - 30 March 1950)
- Royal Naval Air Station Lee-on-Solent (HMS Daedalus), Hampshire, (30 March 1950 - 31 March 1950)
- disbanded - (31 March 1950)

1950 - 1951

- Royal Naval Air Station Lee-on-Solent (HMS Daedalus), Hampshire, (1 September 1950 - 14 September 1950)
- RN Air Section Gibraltar, Gibraltar, (14 September 1950 - 27 November 1950)
- Royal Naval Air Station Lee-on-Solent (HMS Daedalus), Hampshire, (27 November 1950 - 16 January 1951)
- RN Air Section Gibraltar, Gibraltar, (16 January 1951 - 1 March 1951)
- Royal Naval Air Station Lee-on-Solent (HMS Daedalus), Hampshire, (1 March 1951 - 31 March 1951)
- disbanded - (31 March 1951

== Commanding officers ==
List of commanding officers of 773 Naval Air Squadron, with date of appointment:

1940 - 1944

- Lieutenant Commander H. Wright, RN, from 28 June 1940
- Lieutenant Commander G.C.W. Fowler, RN, from September 1941
- Lieutenant Commander K.W. Beard, RN, from 6 August 1943
- disbanded - 25 April 1944

1945 - 1946

- Lieutenant Commander(E) W.P.T. Croome, RN, from 1 June 1945
- Lieutenant Commander(E) P. Richmond, RN, from 20 August 1945
- disbanded - 30 September 1946

1949

- Lieutenant A. Haslam, RN, from 6 January 1949
- disbanded 31 March 1949

1950

- Lieutenant R.C.B. Trelawney, RN, from 4 January 1950
- disbanded - 31 March 1950

1950 - 1951

- Lieutenant J.F. Smith, RN, from 1 September 1950
- disbanded - 31 March 1951
