= Cawdor Barracks =

British Army installation in Wales

Cawdor Barracks
- Near Brawdy, Pembrokeshire in Wales
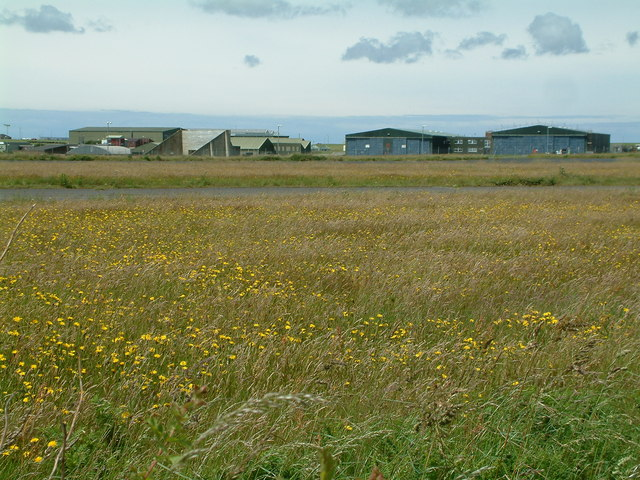
- Cawdor Barracks

Site information
- Type: Barracks
- Owner: Ministry of Defence
- Operator: British Army
- Controlled by: Royal Corps of Signals

Location
- Shown within Pembrokeshire
- Coordinates: 51°53′01″N 005°07′26″W

Site history
- Built: 1944
- In use: 1944–1946, 1974–1995 (RAF); 1946–1971 (FAA); 1995 – present (British Army)

Garrison information
- Garrison: 14 Signal Regiment

Airfield information
- Elevation: 111 metres (364 ft) AMSL
Runways
Direction	Length and surface
~~00/00~~	Concrete
~~00/00~~	Concrete
Helipads
Number	Length and surface
01	25 metres (82 ft) Concrete

Cawdor Barracks is a British Army installation located 6.3 miles (10.1 km) east of St Davids, Pembrokeshire and 9.8 miles (15.8 km) south west of Fishguard, Pembrokeshire, Wales.

It was an operational airfield between 1944 and 1992, being used by both the Royal Air Force (when it was known as RAF Brawdy) and by Royal Navy's Fleet Air Arm (RNAS Brawdy), before closing in 1992. The site was reactivated in 1995 by the British Army and became Cawdor Barracks, home to 14 Signal Regiment, the army's electronic warfare unit.

== History ==
The Royal Air Force station at Brawdy officially opened on 2 February 1944 as a satellite station for the heavy bomber aircraft of nearby RAF St Davids.

=== Royal Naval Air Station Brawdy ===
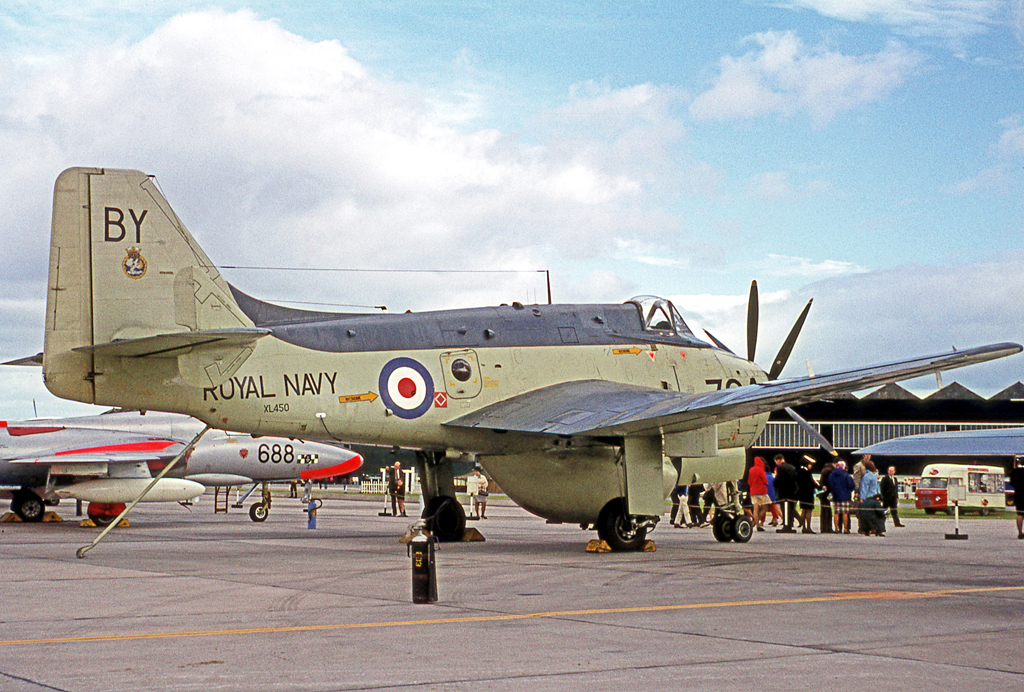
Fairey Gannet AEW.3 of 849 Squadron based at RNAS Brawdy in 1970

On 1 January 1946 the station was handed over to the Fleet Air Arm of the Royal Navy and became Royal Naval Air Station (RNAS Brawdy), initially used as a Relief Landing Ground for RNAS Dale located near Milford Haven. It was commissioned as HMS Goldcrest on 4 September 1952 and in March 1953 the first Hawker Sea Hawk entered service with 806 Naval Air Squadron. From 1963 till 1971 Brawdy was home to Fairey Gannets and Hawker Hunters in the Airborne Early Warning (AEW) and advanced flying training roles respectively. The Royal Navy left in 1971 and the base was allocated to the Department of the Environment.

=== RAF Brawdy ===
In February 1974, the Royal Air Force returned to Brawdy with 'D' Flight of No. 22 Squadron taking up residence with their Westland Whirlwind HAR.10 search and rescue helicopters. In September of the same year, No. 229 Operational Conversion Unit, later the Tactical Weapons Unit (TWU), relocated with the Hawker Hunters after the closure of RAF Chivenor in Devon. By the late 1970s, the TWU operated British Aerospace Hawk T1A Squadron.

=== Transfer to the British Army ===
As part of the rationalisation of advanced and tactical weapons training, flying ceased at Brawdy on 31 August 1992. A small number of RAF personnel remained including No. 202 Squadron and their Westland Sea Kings, which eventually left in July 1994.

Brawdy was transferred to the British Army in 1995 and became Cawdor Barracks, the Army's main electronic warfare base. The name originated from the local Earls of Cawdor, who owned the Stackpole Estate.

Cawdor Barracks is currently home to the 14 Signal Regiment ("14 Sigs"), the British Army's electronic warfare unit.

== Units ==
Units based include:

- Royal Corps of Signals (1st Intelligence, Surveillance and Reconnaissance Brigade)
  - 14 Signal Regiment (Electronic Warfare)
    - 223 Signal Squadron (Electronic Warfare)
    - 226 Signal Squadron (Electronic Warfare)
    - 237 Signal Squadron (Electronic Warfare)
    - 245 Signal Squadron (Electronic Warfare)
    - Operations Support Squadron

== Future ==
In November 2016, the Ministry of Defence (MOD) announced that Cawdor Barracks would close in 2024. This was later extended to 2028.

However, in December 2023, the Ministry of Defence announced plans to keep the site open for Cawdor to host one of three Deep Space Advanced Radar Capability sites, a joint programme between the UK, US and Australia. The site is due to be active by the end of the decade.
