= RAF Brawdy =

Former Royal Air Force station in Pembrokeshire, Wales

RAF Brawdy RNAS Brawdy HMS Goldcrest HMS Goldcrest II
- Near Brawdy, Pembrokeshire in Wales
- Amddiffynfa Y Gorllewin (Welsh for 'The Western Fortification')

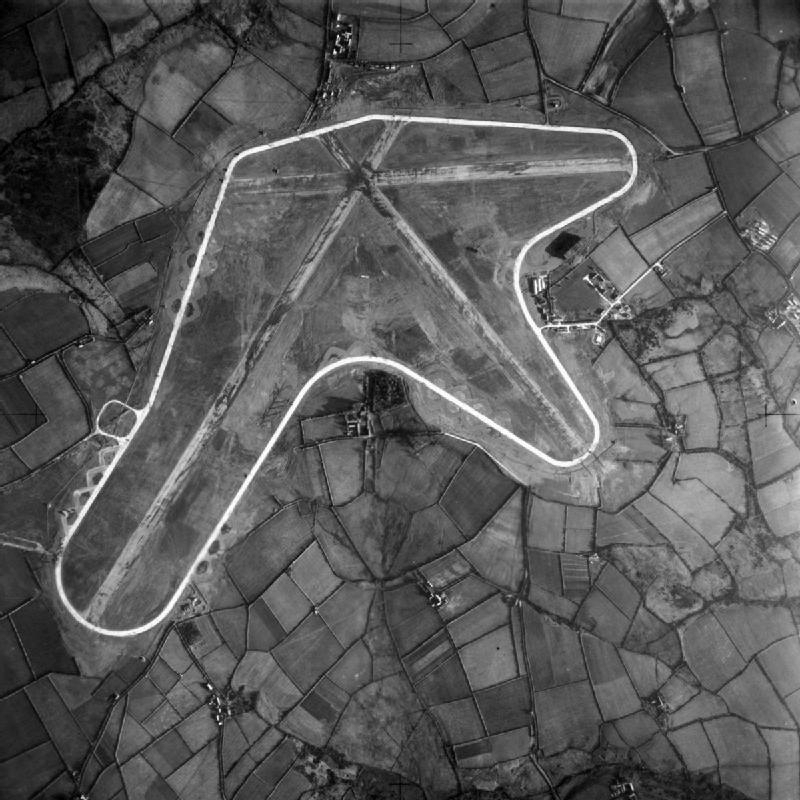
- Aerial image of RAF Brawdy during 1944 (North to left)

Site information
- Type: Royal Air Force station
- Owner: Ministry of Defence
- Operator: Royal Air Force; 1944–46 & 1974–92; Royal Navy; 1946-71
- Controlled by: RAF Coastal Command * No. 19 Group RAF; Fleet Air Arm
- Condition: Closed

Location
- Shown within Pembrokeshire RAF Brawdy (the United Kingdom)
- Coordinates: 51°53′01″N 005°07′26″W

Site history
- Built: 1943/44
- In use: 1944–1971 & 1974–1992
- Fate: Transferred to British Army in 1995 to become Cawdor Barracks.
- Battles/wars: European theatre of World War II; Cold War

Airfield information
- Identifiers: ICAO: EGDA, WMO: 03603
- Elevation: 350 feet (107 m) AMSL
Runways
Direction	Length and surface
02/20	2,321 metres (7,615 ft) Asphalt
15/33	1,950 metres (6,398 ft) Asphalt
- Note: Airfield no longer in use.

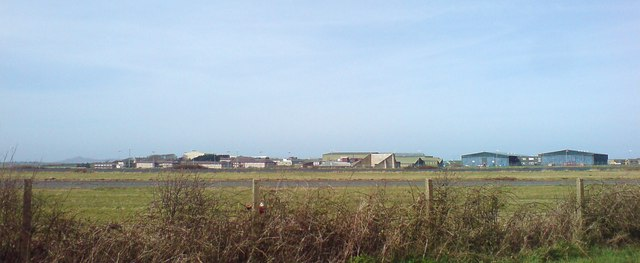
A view of the former Airbase at Brawdy in 2009

Royal Air Force Brawdy or more simply RAF Brawdy is a former Royal Air Force station located 6 miles (9.7 km) east of St Davids, Pembrokeshire and 10 miles (16 km) south west of Fishguard, Pembrokeshire, Wales. It was operational between 1944 and 1992; it was used by the Royal Air Force (1944–1946 and 1971–1992) and the Royal Navy (1946–1971), before the site was turned over to the British Army and renamed Cawdor Barracks.

The village of Brawdy is adjacent to the south-east of the airfield, which lies one mile inland from the north-east shores of St. Bride's Bay and seven miles east south east of St David's Head. Haverfordwest lies seven miles (11 km) south-east. Notable landmarks are St. David's peninsula, with the city of St. Davids and its cathedral, and Ramsey Island.

== History ==
=== RAF Coastal Command ===
The Pembrokeshire base was opened on 2 February 1944, as a satellite station for the nearby RAF St Davids, under No. 19 Group, RAF Coastal Command, with No 517 Meteorological Squadron moving in the day before. The unit operated with the Handley Page Halifax Mk V, before changing to the Mk III, in March 1945. The squadron moved to RAF Chivenor in November 1945. No. 58 and No. 502 Sqns used the airfield to undertake anti-submarine patrols from February 1944, while based at RAF St Davids.

The next squadron to move in was No. 521 Squadron RAF, from December 1944 until May 1945, as a detachment operating the Boeing Fortress I.

Between February and June in 1945, No. 8 (Coastal) Operational Training Unit RAF was a lodger unit at Brawdy, due to lack of space at RAF Haverfordwest, providing photo reconnaissance training with a detachment of Supermarine Spitfire and de Havilland Mosquito aircraft.

RAF St Davids became the satellite station when its headquarters, sick bay and workshops facilities, moved to RAF Brawdy in November 1945.

Between 2 February 1944 and 27 April 1946, No. 595 Squadron RAF aircraft may have had a detachment based here with a variety of aircraft.

=== Royal Navy ===
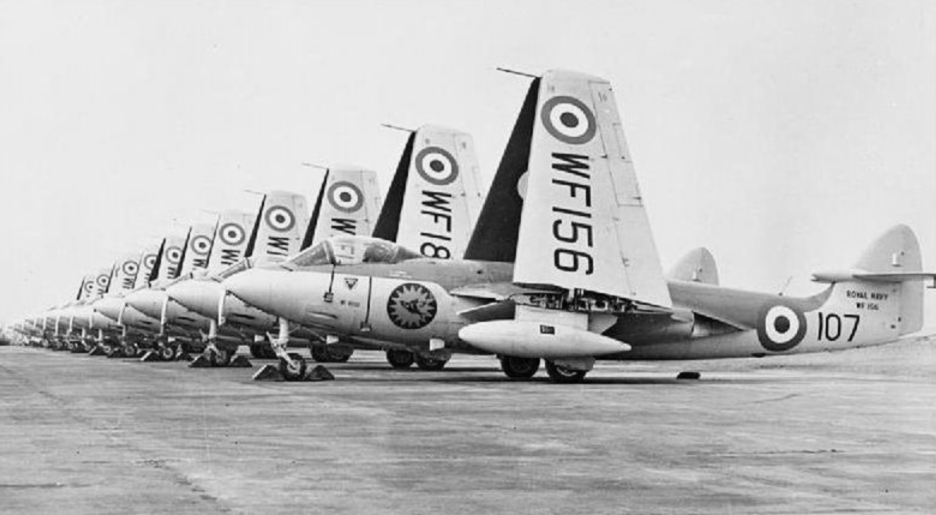
Sea Hawk F1s of 898 Naval Air Squadron at RNAS Brawdy, 1954

On 1 January 1946, the station was transferred over to the Admiralty from the Air Ministry, on loan, and became Royal Naval Air Station Brawdy (RNAS Brawdy, also known as HMS Goldcrest II). It was initially used as a Relief Landing Ground for RNAS Dale. On 31 March 1948, Brawdy was reduced to Care & Maintenance status as War Reserve. Following the closure of RNAS Dale, RNAS Brawdy was then commissioned as HMS Goldcrest on 4 September 1952. The base went into reserve, in 1960, to enable modernisation work, reopening in April 1963, before paying off on the 1 March 1971.

In January 1946, 784 Night Fighter Training Squadron moved to RNAS Dale, but operated out of RNAS Brawdy, providing night fighter instruction for the next nine months from here. 773 Pilotless Aircraft Unit was relocated from RNAS Lee-on-Solent (HMS Daedalus), in March 1946. It was set up as a service trials unit, to develop pilotless drone aircraft. Both squadrons disbanded at RNAS Brawdy in September 1946. 811 Two-seat Fighter Squadron arrived at RNAS Brawdy in December 1946. It was notably the only front-line FAA squadron to operate the Sea Mosquito T.R.33. The squadron departed for RNAS Eglinton (HMS Gannet) in March 1947.

The station was next used by Airwork Services Ltd from January 1950, which ran a civilian-operated unit for the Royal Navy, the Airwork Air Direction Training Unit (ADTU). Airwork was contracted by the Fleet Air Arm to exercise the Aircraft Direction School at nearby HMS Harrier. They also undertook a Heavy Twin Conversion Course for FAA pilots. This unit moved to RAF St Davids in September 1951.

RNAS Brawdy was commissioned as HMS Goldcrest on 4 September 1952, with a ceremony outside the headquarters that featured over 300 officers and ratings. There were significant modifications between 1951 and 1956. These included new lighting and radio for airfield homing and approach, new ground radar, extra workshops and buildings, refurbished control tower, resurfacing of the runways and additional hardstanding. All domestic accommodation was also significantly improved.

On 2 March 1953, the Hawker Sea Hawk entered service with the Fleet Air Arm at RNAS Brawdy with 806 Naval Air Squadron, which reformed on that date.

In January 1956, 727 Dartmouth Cadet Air Training Squadron was formed to give non-flying junior officers air experience. 767 Fighter Pilot Pool Squadron arrived from RNAS Ford in August 1956, to provide an armament work-up course but departed the following month. The Air Direction Training Unit (ADTU) returned from RAF St Davids in October 1958, but in January 1961 it left for RNAS Yeovilton (HMS Heron)

The main runway was extended in 1960, and three interconnecting hangars were added, along with a new technical block.

Accommodation was improved and expanded, including specific quarters for Wrens. From 1963 to 1971, the base was home to the Advanced Flying Training Unit and housed the Airborne Early Warning HQ. Fairey Gannet and Hawker Hunter aircraft were based at RNAS Brawdy, with 849 Naval Air Squadron operating Gannet, 759 Naval Air Squadron with two seat Hunter and 738 Naval Air Squadron with single seat Hunter. Gannet were primarily used in an Airborne Early Warning (AEW) role and the Hunter for advanced flying training, including low-level navigation, ground attack and air-to-air weapons training.

759 Naval Advanced Flying Training School reformed at RNAS Brawdy in August 1963, providing Part 1 of the Fleet Air Arm's Advance Flying Training course. 738 Advanced Training Squadron relocated to RNAS Brawdy in January 1964, from RNAS Lossiemouth, where it operated as Part 2 of the Advanced Flying Training course.

849 Airborne Early Warning squadron arrived in December 1964. It operated variants of Gannet aircraft across four flights and at different times, embarking on the aircraft carriers HMS Ark Royal, HMS Eagle, HMS Hermes and HMS Victorious.

In 1967 RNAS Brawdy was used by 736 NAS and 800 NAS, operating Blackburn Buccaneer, as a base to attack and bomb the oil tanker SS Torrey Canyon from, which had struck Pollard's Rock on West end of the Seven Stones between the Cornish mainland and the Isles of Scilly on 18 March, in an attempt to release and burn off its residual cargo of oil.

=== Morton Air Services ===
Morton Air Services started to operate weekly Croydon Airport to Brawdy flights in April 1958. Another de Havilland Heron 1B aircraft was added in January 1959, enabling a twice weekly service. Swansea Airport was added as an optional stop to this service, beginning on 2 June. The last flight took place on 29 September 1959, with Croydon closing the following day.

=== Department of Environment ===
The Royal Navy left in 1971 and the base was controlled by the Department of Environment. The air base was kept in reasonable order and fully maintained by a civilian team, ensuring that all buildings were ready for use and that hot water systems were fully functioning.

=== RAF Tactical Weapons Unit ===
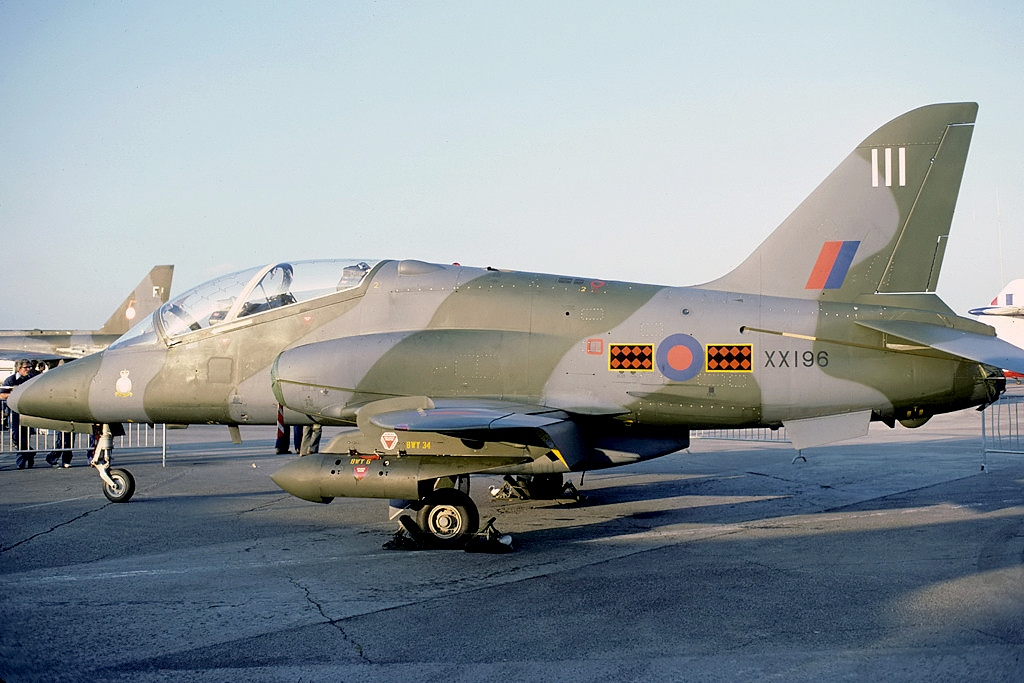
BAE Systems Hawk T1A, XX196, No. 1 Tactical Weapons Unit / No. 234 Squadron RAF, from Brawdy

The Royal Air Force took back control in January 1974, with a ceremony on 1 April that included a Royal Marines band and a Fleet Air Arm fly past, before the air station was handed to the RAF. In February 1974, 'D' Flight of No. 22 Squadron was the first RAF unit to arrive with their search and rescue Westland Whirlwind HAR.10 helicopters. In September of the same year No. 229 Operational Conversion Unit, later renamed the Tactical Weapons Unit (1 TWU), relocated with the Hawker Hunter T.8 aircraft from RAF Chivenor in Devon.

Between 1 September 1976 and July 1978 a detachment of 202 Squadron flying Westland Whirlwind HAR.10s used the airfield. In October 1979, No. 22 sqn was replaced by 'B' Flight of No. 202 Squadron, with Westland Sea King HAR3, for Search and Rescue operations. By the late 1970s the TWU operated BAe Hawk T.1A aircraft (234 and 79 Squadron). with this gradually replacing the Hunter aircraft from 1978.

The station was home to Hawker Hunter aircraft of the TWU, and the gate guardian at the base was initially a Supermarine Spitfire; this was replaced in the early '80s by Hawker Hunter FGA.9 (XE624). This airframe was subsequently sold to Steve Petch, a private collector.

As part of the rationalisation of advanced and tactical weapons training, flying training ceased at Brawdy on 31 August 1992. A small number of RAF personnel remained, including No. 202 Squadron and their Westland Sea Kings, which eventually left in July 1994.

=== Naval Facility Brawdy ===
Naval Facility Brawdy. An entrance to RAF Brawdy is just out of view to the left.

In 1974, Naval Facility Brawdy (51.870917°N 5.137167°W) was established adjacent to Royal Air Force Station Brawdy as the terminus of new Sound Surveillance System (SOSUS) arrays covering the eastern Atlantic. After commissioning on 5 April 1974 NAVFAC Brawdy became the first "super NAVFAC" with some 400 US and UK military and civilian personnel assigned. In 1985, a new type of fixed surveillance system, the Fixed Distributed System (FDS) test array, was terminated at the facility. The facility was decommissioned 1 October 1995 after its arrays had been 'remoted' and its equipment moved to the Joint Maritime Facility, St Mawgan, Cornwall.

=== Cawdor Barracks ===
Brawdy was transferred to the British Army in 1995 and became Cawdor Barracks, the army's main electronic warfare base. The name originated from the local Earls of Cawdor (who owned the Stackpole Estate).

== Royal Air Force Operational History ==
=== Tactical Weapons Unit ===
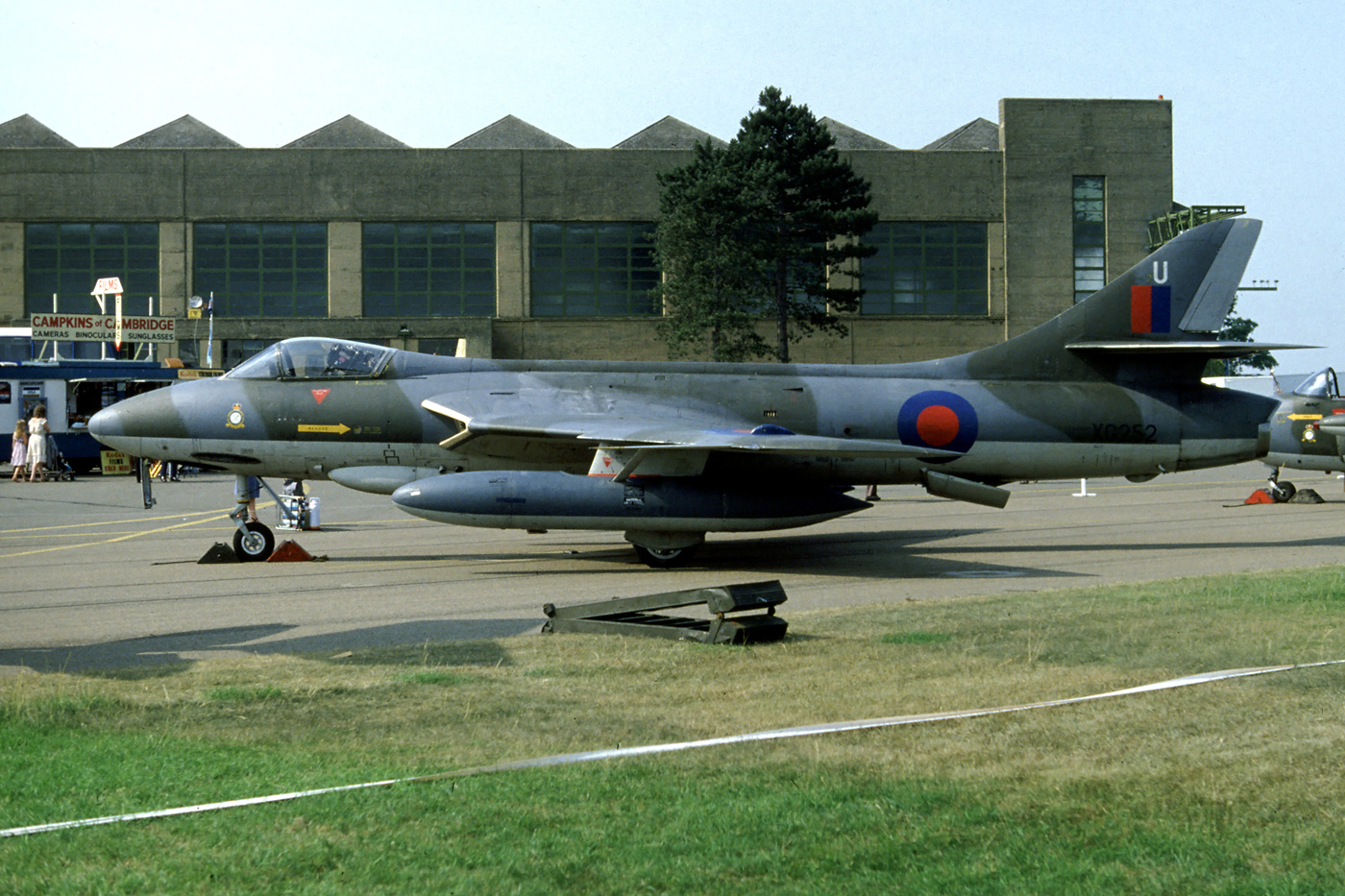
Hawker Hunter FGA.9, XG252, No. 1 Tactical Weapons Unit / No. 79 Squadron RAF, from Brawdy

On 4 September 1974 No. 229 Operational Conversion Unit RAF relocated from RAF Chivenor. The unit was renamed No. 1 Tactical Weapons Unit RAF (1 TWU). It was tasked with training pilots in air combat, air to ground attack and tactical low flying. The unit was initially made up of Nos. 63, 79 and 234 Squadron RAF.

No. 79 Squadron RAF was equipped with Hawker Hunter FGA.9, FR.10 and T.7, a transonic British jet-powered fighter aircraft, along with Gloster Meteor T.7 and T.8 aircraft. The Meteor aircraft were used for target towing, while the Hunter FGA.9 and FR.10 were used to train in Air-to-ground weaponry, including bombs, machine guns, autocannons, air-to-surface missiles and rockets, as well as tactical low level flying. The squadron was also equipped with BAC Jet Provost aircraft for pilot refresher training.

No. 63 Squadron RAF and No. 234 Squadron RAF both operated Hawker Hunter F.6 and T.7 aircraft. These were used to train air-to-air gunnery, using other Hunter or Meteor aircraft to simulate air combat.

Pilots would graduate from the Flying School at RAF Valley to the Tactical Weapons Unit at Brawdy and upon graduating from the TWU classes would be posted to an operational conversion unit (OCU) for either Blackburn Buccaneer, Hawker Siddeley Harrier, McDonnell Douglas Phantom or Panavia Tornado aircraft.

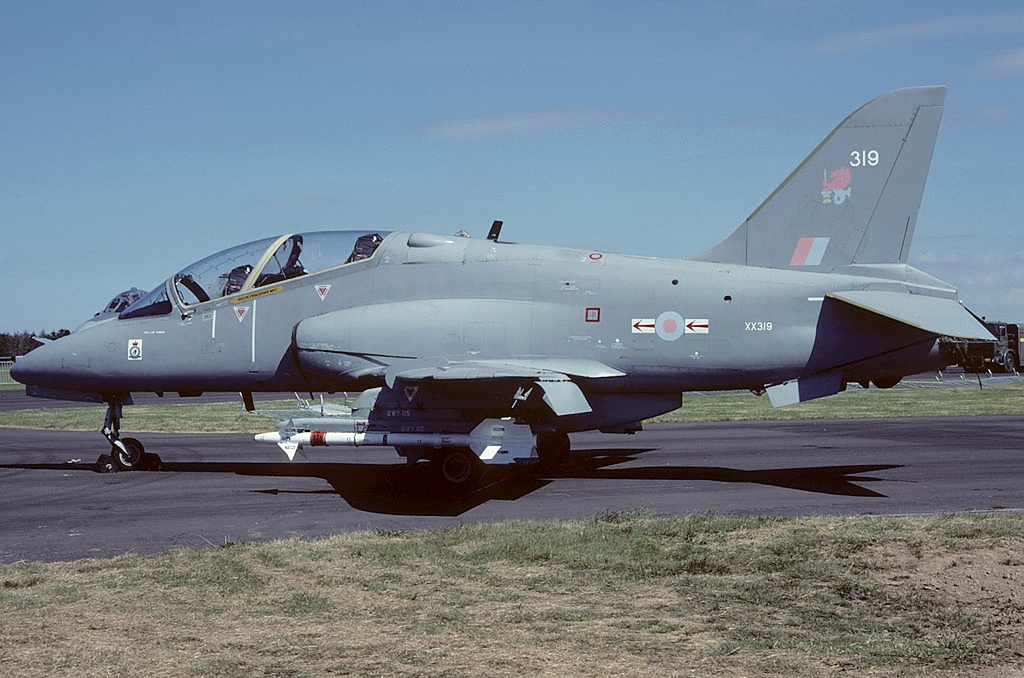
BAE Systems Hawk T1A, XX319, No. 1 Tactical Weapons Unit / No. 79 Squadron RAF, from Brawdy

In 1978, Hawker Siddeley Hawk aircraft started to replace the Hawker Hunter at Brawdy. Starting with No. 234 Sqn, followed by No. 63 Sqn in 1979 and No. 79 Sqn completed in 1984. No. 63 Sqn was transferred to No. 2 TWU, based at RAF Chivenor, on 1 August 1980

=== Meteorological Unit ===
No. 517 Squadron RAF, a meteorological squadron, arrived on 2 February 1944, equipped with Handley Page Halifax Mk II and Mk V aircraft, modified for meteorological work to Met 3 and Met 5 respectively, from RAF St Davids. The unit undertook meteorological flights over the Western Approaches, obtaining valuable meteorological data, from patrols over the Bay of Biscay and the Atlantic Ocean, which was used to support military planning, as no weather ships operated in the Atlantic. The squadron also operated Handley Page Hampden, Lockheed Hudson, Boeing B-17 Flying Fortress and a Short Stirling Met 4s for meteorological training. It moved to RAF Weston Zoyland in September 1945.

No. 521 Squadron RAF, was a meteorological observation unit, it operated a detachment at RAF Brawdy from December 1944 until May 1945. It was equipped with Boeing B-17 Flying Fortress aircraft, for its meteorological flights.

An RAF Radio Meteorological Flight worked out of Brawdy when the airfield was initially taken over by the Admiralty. From January to July in 1946 it operated with six Airspeed Oxford aircraft.

=== RAF Search and Rescue Flight ===
'D' Flight of No. 22 Squadron RAF arrived in February 1974, as the Royal Air Force returned to Brawdy, to undertake search and rescue operations. It was equipped with Westland Whirlwind HAR.10 helicopter.

'B' Flight of No. 202 Squadron RAF took over from No. 22 Sqn from September 1976. It was initially equipped with Westland Whirlwind HAR.10 helicopter, but from October 1979 these were replaced by Westland Sea King HAR.3 helicopter.

The Flight kept a fifteen-minute readiness during daylight hours and a forty-five minute readiness during the hours of darkness. In 1990 the Flight responded to its highest number of calls in a year, 170 in total, both civilian and military, and airlifted 169 people. In its time at Brawdy it had over 2,000 call-outs. The Dyfed Wildlife Trust also asked the Flight to transport equipment and supplies to the islands of Skomer and Skokholm from time to time. ‘B’ Flight of No. 22 Sqn was the last unit to leave RAF Brawdy in 1996.

=== Other Units ===
==== Joint Forward Air Controller Training and Standards Unit ====
The Joint Forward Air Control Training and Standards Unit (JFACTSU) operated out of RAF Brawdy, made up of No. 610 Tactical Air Control Party (Forward Air Controller) (TACP(FAC)) and No. 501 Ground Liaison Section, out of the Joint Warfare Establishment's School of Land/Air Warfare that moved from RAF Chivenor.

==== No. 8 Operational Training Unit ====
No. 8 (Coastal) Operational Training Unit RAF was part of No. 17 Group RAF, RAF Coastal Command. It trained aircrew on a wide range of photo-reconnaissance aircraft, including the Supermarine Spitfire and de Havilland Mosquito.

On the 27 February 1945 a detachment of around thirty Spitfire and Mosquito aircraft of No. 8 (C) OTU arrived at Brawdy, due to lack of space at RAF Haverfordwest. The unit became a lodger and remained at Brawdy until June when it relocated to RAF Mount Farm.

==== Anti-aircraft co-operation ====
No. 595 Squadron RAF, an anti-aircraft co-operation unit based at RAF Aberporth, operated a detachment at Brawdy from the 7 February 1945 for three weeks. Composed of three Miles Martinet and two Supermarine Spitfire Mk XII aircraft, the unit undertook target towing for the anti-aircraft school at RAF Manorbier. An additional detachment of Supermarine Spitfire Mk Vb and Mk XII aircraft operated from Brawdy from the end of February until June and took part in trials involving target gliders to provide practice for coastal AA batteries.

== Royal Navy Operational History ==
=== Hawker Sea Hawk ===
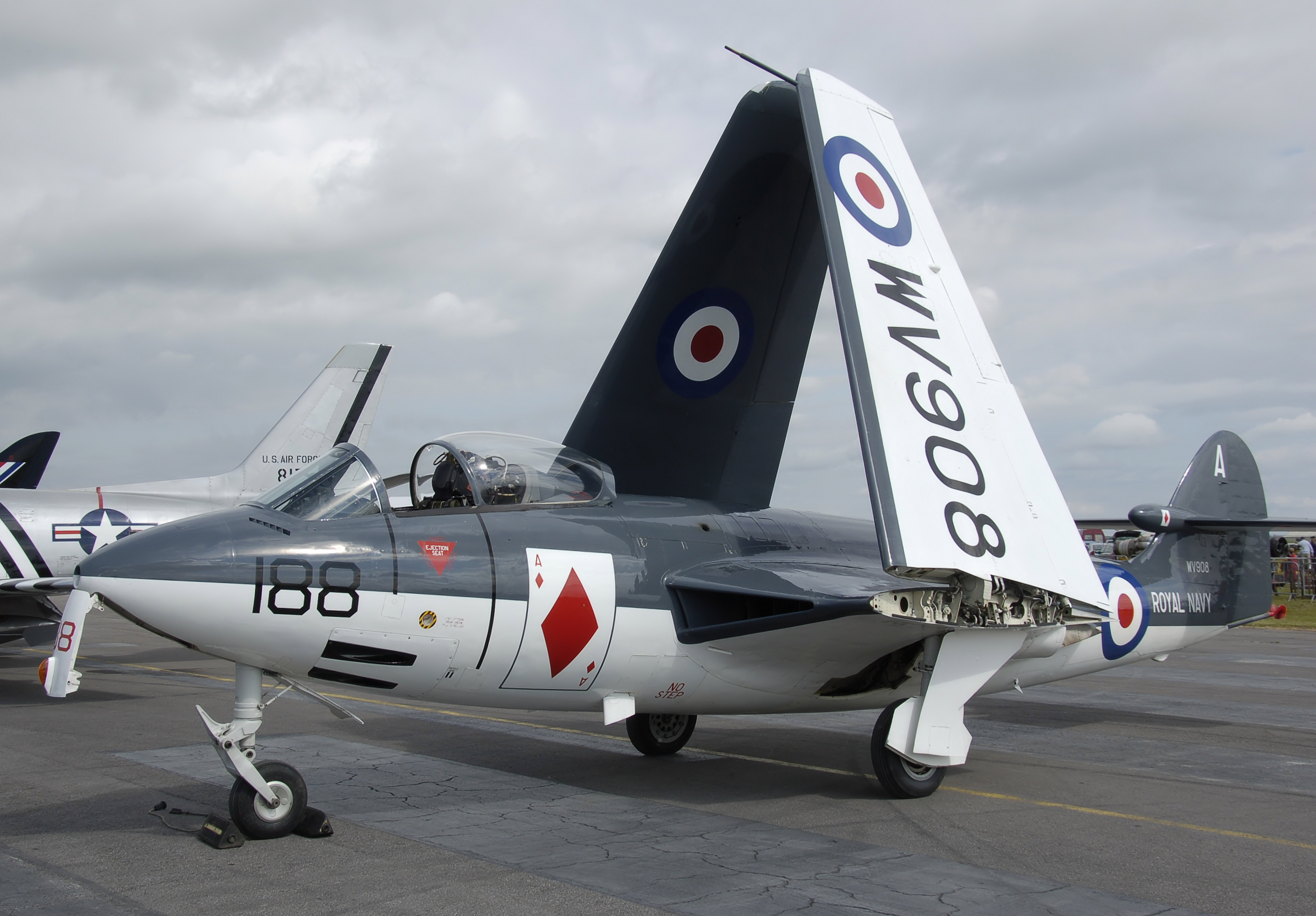
Hawker Sea Hawk FGA.6, WV908, in 806 Naval Air Squadron markings

800 Naval Air Squadron fighter squadron, reformed at RNAS Brawdy on the 8 November 1954. Throughout its time at the air station, it operated different variants of Hawker Sea Hawk aircraft, and was initially equipped with the FB.3 aircraft. In June 1955 these were withdrawn and replaced with FGA.4 and FGA.6 variants, as the squadron worked-up for embarkation on HMS Ark Royal, in the September. On returning to RNAS Brawdy in March 1956, the squadron disbanded on the 4 April. It then reformed on 7 May at RNAS Brawdy and took part in Suez operations from HMS Albion, in the November. In 1958 the squadron operated from HMS Ark Royal when not at RNAS Brawdy, solely using FGA.6, but finally disbanded at the air station on 3 March 1959.

801 Naval Air Squadron a fighter squadron, was based at RNAS Brawdy from 4 May 1957. It was equipped with Hawker Sea Hawk FGA.6 and worked up during the following six months, embarking on HMS Bulwark on 14 November 1957. The squadron was based out of RNAS Brawdy when not on detachment abroad or on an aircraft carrier, until disbanding on 26 July 1960.

804 Naval Air Squadron a fighter squadron, was at RNAS Brawdy in 1959 following deployments, and was equipped with Hawker Sea Hawk FGA.6. The squadron arrived on the 17 August, but only remained at the air station for around one month before disbanding on 30 September 1959.

806 Naval Air Squadron fighter squadron reformed at RNAS Brawdy, on 2 March 1953. It was equipped with Hawker Sea Hawk F.1, being the first front-line squadron in the Fleet Air Arm to use the type. It embarked, to take part in angle-deck trials, later in 1953, on aircraft carrier USS Antietam. The squadron was also the last front-line Fleet Air Arm squadron to use the Sea Hawk, disbanding at RNAS Brawdy with the FGA.6 variant, on 15 December 1960.

807 Naval Air Squadron fighter squadron, moved from RNAS Anthorn (HMS Nuthatch), 5 May 1954, it received Hawker Sea Hawk F.2. As the squadron worked-up, these were swapped for FB.3 variant, in November, before embarking on HMS Bulwark, in February 1955, for two weeks. FGA. Four variants arrived in March, and in July the squadron embarked on HMS Albion.

895 Naval Air Squadron fighter squadron, reformed at RNAS Brawdy, on 23 April 1956. It was equipped with Hawker Sea Hawk FGA.4 and FGA.6 aircraft, embarking in HMS Bulwark, in August. It swapped these for FB.3 variants and then took part in Suez Crisis operations.

897 Naval Air Squadron fighter squadron, reformed at RNAS Brawdy, on 7 November 1955. It was equipped with Hawker Sea Hawk FB.3 aircraft, embarking in HMS Eagle in April 1956. In October 1956, it swapped to the FGA.6 variant and took part in Suez operations.

898 Naval Air Squadron fighter squadron, reformed at RNAS Brawdy, on 24 August 1953. It was equipped with Hawker Sea Hawk F1 aircraft, however, these we replaced by FB.3 in July 1954. Embarking in HMS Albion in September 1954 for six months, before briefly joining HMS Bulwark in May 1955. It re-equipped with Hawker Sea Hawk FGA.6 aircraft, and in September 1955 embarked in HMS Ark Royal. It disbanded at RNAS Brawdy on 19 April 1956, reforming on 30 July, this time with Hawker Sea Hawk FGA.4 aircraft. These were replaced by FGA.6 in January 1957, in which month it joined HMS Ark Royal. Further spells on other aircraft carriers followed, however, it disbanded at RNAS Brawdy, on 30 April 1959.

=== Naval Advanced Flying Training School ===
759 Naval Air Squadron reformed at RNAS Brawdy, on 1 August 1963, as the Naval Advanced Flying Training School. Here it was equipped with Hawker Hunter T.8 aircraft. The squadron provided Part 1 of the Fleet Air Arm's Advance Flying Training course. Student pilots either moved on to 738 Naval Air Squadron for weapons training, this time on single seat Hunter aircraft, or to 849 Naval Air Squadron, for Airborne Early Warning training with Fairey Gannet aircraft. In 1965, 759 NAS received the Boyd Trophy, which is awarded annually to the naval pilot(s) or aircrew who, in the opinion of the Flag Officer, Naval Air Command, has achieved the finest feat of aviation during the previous year, for its outstanding work in converting Jet Provost-trained pilots to the Hunter aircraft. On 24 December 1969, 759 NAS disbanded at Brawdy.

738 Naval Air Squadron relocated on 6 January 1964 to RNAS Brawdy from RNAS Lossiemouth (HMS Fulmar), where it operated as Part 2 of the Fleet Air Arm's Advance Flying Training course, giving tuition on fighter tactics and weapons release to pupils from 759 NAS, also based at Brawdy.

Rough Diamonds

Using three Hawker Hunter GA.11 and a single Hawker Hunter T.8 aircraft, a Fleet Air Arm aerobatic team was formed from 738 NAS, led by Lt Cdr Chris Comins, whilst at RNAS Brawdy. They were known as the Rough Diamonds and were operational from 1965, disbanding in 1969. The aircraft were finished in the standard Fleet Air Arm colour scheme of extra-dark sea grey on top over a white underside. However, the lead aircraft also had a day-glo red nose-band, fuselage spine and wingtips. All aircraft carried 'BY' for Brawdy on both sides of the tail and a 'Pegasus' on both sides of the nose for 738 NAS. The team made many public appearances, including being broadcast on BBC television.

738 NAS was disbanded at Brawdy on 8 May 1970.

=== Airborne Early Warning ===
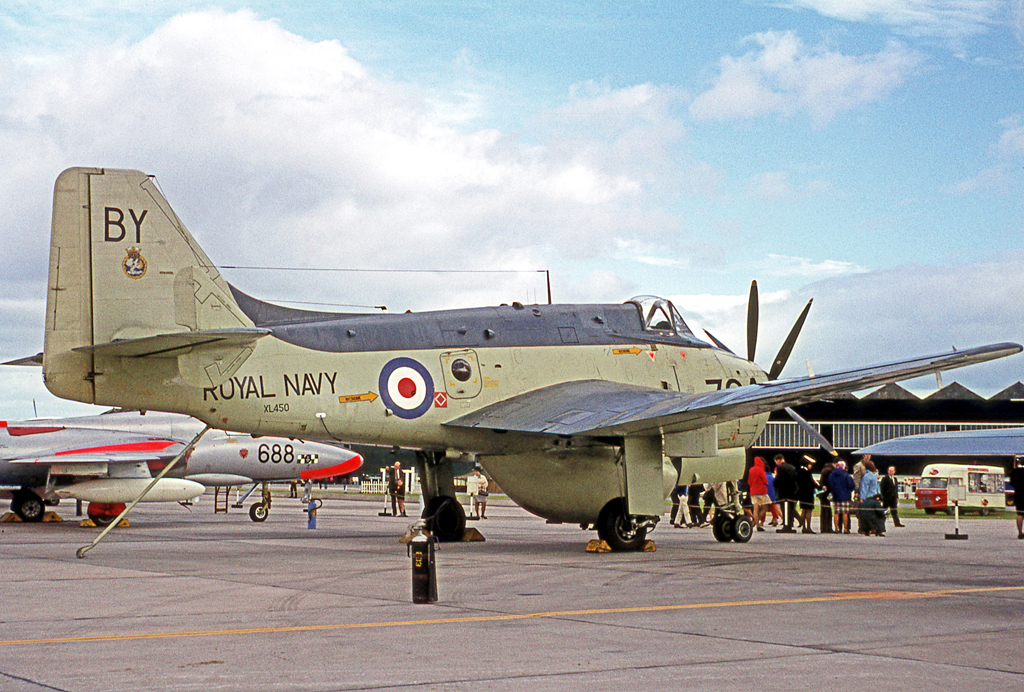
Fairey Gannet AEW.3 XL450 BY-764 of 849 Squadron based at RNAS Brawdy in 1970

849 Naval Air Squadron was an Airborne Early Warning unit. The squadron was the sole operator of the Fairey Gannet AEW.3 aircraft. It had four operational flights, plus a HQ flight. The HQ flight arrived at RNAS Brawdy, on 15 December 1964, from RNAS Culdrose (HMS Seahawk), while the four operational flights were assigned across the Royal Navy's operational aircraft carriers, disembarking and embarking as and when required. The Flights relevant to operations at RNAS Brawdy:

- HQ Flight – RNAS Brawdy (1965–1970)
- A Flight – HMS Victorious (1963–1967); HMS Hermes (1968–1970) - disbanded
- B Flight – HMS Hermes (1962–1967); HMS Ark Royal (1970–1978)
- C Flight – HMS Ark Royal (1962–1966) - disbanded
- D Flight – HMS Eagle (1964–1971)

Each Flight operated four Fairey Gannet AEW.3 aircraft, to provide airborne early warning, essentially extending the carrier's radar range, but could also be used for Strike Direction, Anti-Submarine Warfare and Surface Search and Shadowing, plus a Fairey Gannet COD.4 aircraft, for ship-to-shore communications. 849C Flight was disbanded in October 1966, following the reduction of the carrier fleet to four ships, however, it was awarded the Boyd Trophy that year for Outstanding Performance in HMS Ark Royal during Mozambique patrol. 849B Flight reformed and worked-up for HMS Ark Royal in January 1970; however, 849A Flight disbanded in July of that year. On 19 November, the squadron relocated to RNAS Lossiemouth.

=== Naval Aircraft Support Unit ===
In 1963 the Naval Aircraft Support Unit (NASU) relocated from RNAS Abbotsinch (HMS Sanderling). The unit was made up of over 300 personnel and utilised the three interconnected hangars at Brawdy.

NASU was responsible for aircraft storage. This fell into two categories. Aircraft that were mothballed were stored in a humidity-free environment, however, aircraft awaiting disposal were usually held at the satellite airfield, RAF St Davids.

The units main role was providing aircraft for front line operations. Between 1967 and 1968 around 130 aircraft of various types, including Supermarine Scimitar, de Havilland Sea Vixen, Fairey Gannet, Hawker Hunter, de Havilland Sea Devon and de Havilland Sea Heron aircraft, were delivered to Fleet Air Arm squadrons.

It overhauled the aircraft and fitted modifications where required. Repair work was also undertaken along with flight testing. However, by 1969 the unit had reduced in size with many personnel moving elsewhere.

=== Helicopter Search and Rescue Flight ===
The Fleet Air Arm operated a Search and Rescue Flight while there was a Royal Navy presence at Brawdy. It was initially equipped with Westland WS-51 Dragonfly helicopter, which were later replaced by Westland Whirlwind. This operated as part of the Station Flight and flew a number of different helicopter types, including:

- Westland Dragonfly HR.3 (Mar 1953 - Jan 1958)
- Westland Dragonfly HR.5 (Jul 1957 - Jun 1963)
- Westland Whirlwind HAS.7 (May 1963 - Sep 1968)
- Westland Whirlwind HAR.9 (Dec 1968 - Jan 1971)

=== Other Units ===
==== Night Fighter School ====
784 Naval Air Squadron was a Night Fighter Training Squadron. It moved to RNAS Dale, from RNAS Drem (HMS Nighthawk) on 15 January 1946, but operated at RNAS Brawdy until disbanding. The squadron was equipped with Fairey Firefly NF.Mk I, a night fighter variant; Grumman F6F Hellcat N.F. Mk II, a night fighter version, fitted with an AN/APS-6 radar; and the North American Harvard II. It disbanded on 10 September 1946, becoming 'B' flight of the existing Fighter Direction Training Unit at RNAS Dale, 790 Naval Air Squadron.

==== Pilotless Aircraft Unit ====
773 Naval Air Squadron was a Pilotless Aircraft Unit (PAU). It moved from RNAS Lee-on-Solent, on 29 March 1946. The squadron operated three Miles Martinet, M.50 Queen Martinet variant, an unmanned radio-controlled target drone aircraft, Avro Anson I, a twin-engined, multi-role aircraft and de Havilland Mosquito B.25, a twin-engined, multirole combat aircraft.

Aircrew initially flew the Queen Martinet before it was put under radio control, then monitored the systems. The aircraft was designed to meet Air Ministry Specification Q.10/43, from an operational requirement for a radio-controlled target drone. Other squadron aircraft operated as a shepherd aircraft, while the Martinet was operated via radio control. The squadron disbanded on 30 September 1946.

==== First Line Fighter Squadrons ====
802 Naval Air Squadron was a fighter squadron. It disembarked from HMS Theseus to RNAS Brawdy on 12 May 1953. The squadron remained for around one month before re-embarking on Theseus on the 16 June. It was equipped with Hawker Sea Fury FB.11 aircraft.

804 Naval Air Squadron was a fighter squadron, it moved from RNAS Culdrose on 29 October 1952. It was equipped with Hawker Sea Fury FB.11 aircraft. The squadron worked-up over the following three months, embarking on HMS Indomitable on 20 January 1953. It returned to RNAS Brawdy in May 1953 before embarking on HMS Theseus one month later on 17 June.

811 Naval Air Squadron was a Two-Seat Fighter Squadron. It moved from RNAS Ford on 6 December 1946, it was the only front line FAA unit to operate the de Havilland Sea Mosquito TR.33, which was a de Havilland Mosquito FB.VI modified for carrier operations, and it then moved to RNAS Eglinton on 31 March 1947.

813 Naval Air Squadron operated its 'X' Flight out of RNAS Brawdy from 18 March 1957. It was equipped with three Westland Wyvern S.4 aircraft, but this transferred to 831 Naval Air Squadron, on the 5 April, going to RNAS Ford. The rest of the squadron arrived at RNAS Brawdy on 20 March, also equipped with Westland Wyvern S.4 aircraft and worked-up before deploying to HMS Eagle on 5 August 1957.

824 Naval Air Squadron is an anti-submarine squadron. A detachment used RNAS Brawdy during 25 and 26 October 1954 operating Grumman TBM Avenger AS4 aircraft. The squadron also operated out of RNAS Brawdy from 7 June to 1 July 1955, when it was equipped with Fairey Gannet AS.1.

831 Naval Air Squadron was an Electronic Warfare unit. It was equipped with Fairey Gannet ECM.6 and de Havilland Sea Venom ECM.22 aircraft, operated respectively by 'A' and 'B' Flights. Both flights operated out of RNAS Brawdy between 16 and 19 November 1964, and Percival Sea Prince aircraft were also used to support training and familiarisation activities. 'A' Flight also operated a detachment at RNAS Brawdy between 21 and 24 February 1966.

891 Naval Air Squadron was an all-weather fighter squadron, it operated de Havilland Sea Venom FAW.21. It used RNAS Brawdy between 2 and 14 March 1957.

892 Naval Air Squadron was an all-weather fighter squadron, it operated de Havilland Sea Vixen FAW.2. It used RNAS Brawdy for an exercise from 23 August to 8 September 1965.

893 Naval Air Squadron was an all-weather fighter squadron, it operated de Havilland Sea Venom FAW.22. It was stationed at RNAS Brawdy between 6 and 24 October 1959.

1831 Naval Air Squadron was a Royal Naval Reserve training and conversion unit. It was equipped with Boulton Paul Sea Balliol T.21, de Havilland Sea Vampire T.22 and Supermarine Attacker FB.2 aircraft. It used RNAS Brawdy from 28 July to 10 August 1956.

==== Air Experience Unit ====
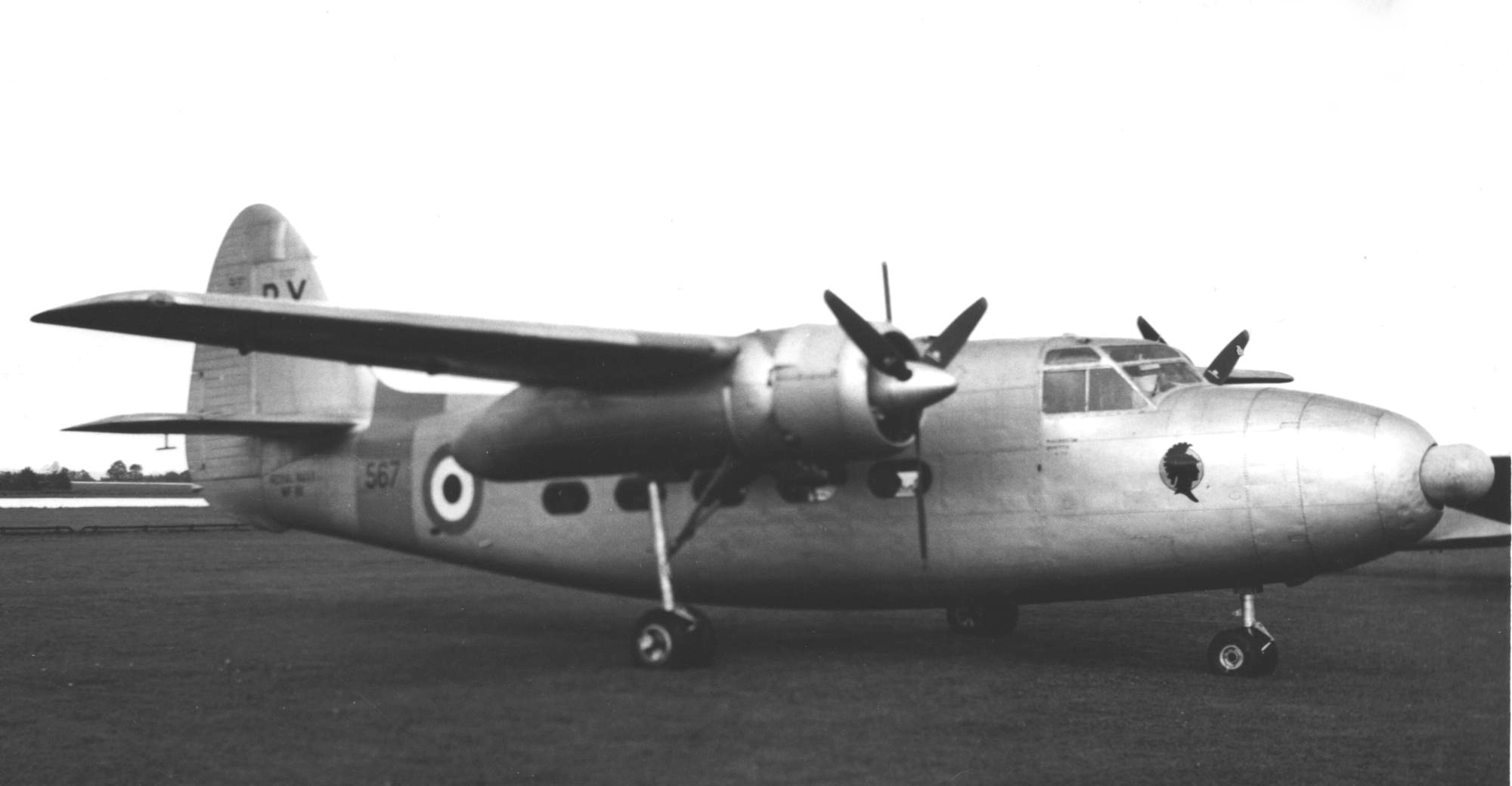
Percival Sea Prince T.1 WF118 of 727 NAS, Brawdy

727 Naval Air Squadron was an Air Experience Squadron. It reformed here on the 4 January 1956, as the Dartmouth Cadet Air Training Squadron, providing non-flying junior officers air experience. The squadron flew Boulton Paul Sea Balliol T.21, De Havilland Sea Vampire T.22, de Havilland Sea Devon C.20 and a Percival Sea Prince T.1. Two Westland Dragonfly HR.5 helicopters were provided, in September 1958; however, the squadron was disbanded on 16 December 1960.

==== Second Line Squadrons ====
736 Naval Air Squadron briefly operated out of RNAS Brawdy for around one month, from 4 June to 2 July 1960. It provided training for, and was equipped with, Supermarine Scimitar F.1 aircraft.

751 Naval Air Squadron operated a detachment at RNAS Brawdy between 13 and 15 May 1957. It operated Grumman TBM Avenger AS4 aircraft. The squadron next operated from the air station four months later between 11 and 19 September, this time equipped with de Havilland Sea Venom aircraft.

767 Naval Air Squadron was a Fighter Pilot Pool Squadron which arrived from RNAS Ford, on 14 August 1956. Here, the squadron provided an armament work-up course, following on from previous general training, at RNAS Ford. It was equipped with Hawker Sea Hawk F.2 and FB.3 aircraft. The squadron only remained for one month, returning to RNAS Ford, on 20 September 1956.

==== Air Direction Training Unit ====
Airwork Services Ltd ran a civilian-operated unit for the Royal Navy, the Airwork Air Direction Training Unit (ADTU), from January 1950. Airwork was contracted by the Fleet Air Arm to exercise the Aircraft Direction School at RNADC Kete (HMS Harrier). They also undertook a Heavy Twin Conversion Course for FAA pilots, with de Havilland Sea Mosquito and de Havilland Sea Hornet aircraft. The unit moved to RAF St Davids in September 1951, where it also provided a jet conversion course, using Gloster Meteor T.7 aircraft. ADTU returned from RAF St Davids in October 1958, but left for RNAS Yeovilton (HMS Heron) in January 1961.

==== RAF St Davids ====
RAF St Davids's headquarters, sick bay and workshops facilities, moved to RAF Brawdy, in November 1945, becoming its satellite airfield. On 1 January 1946, both airfields were taken over by the Royal Navy. A detachment from 787 Naval Air Squadron was based here from April to July 1952. The squadron operated as a trials unit and at the time, flew Hawker Sea Fury FB.11 and de Havilland Vampire FB.5.

==== Station Flight ====
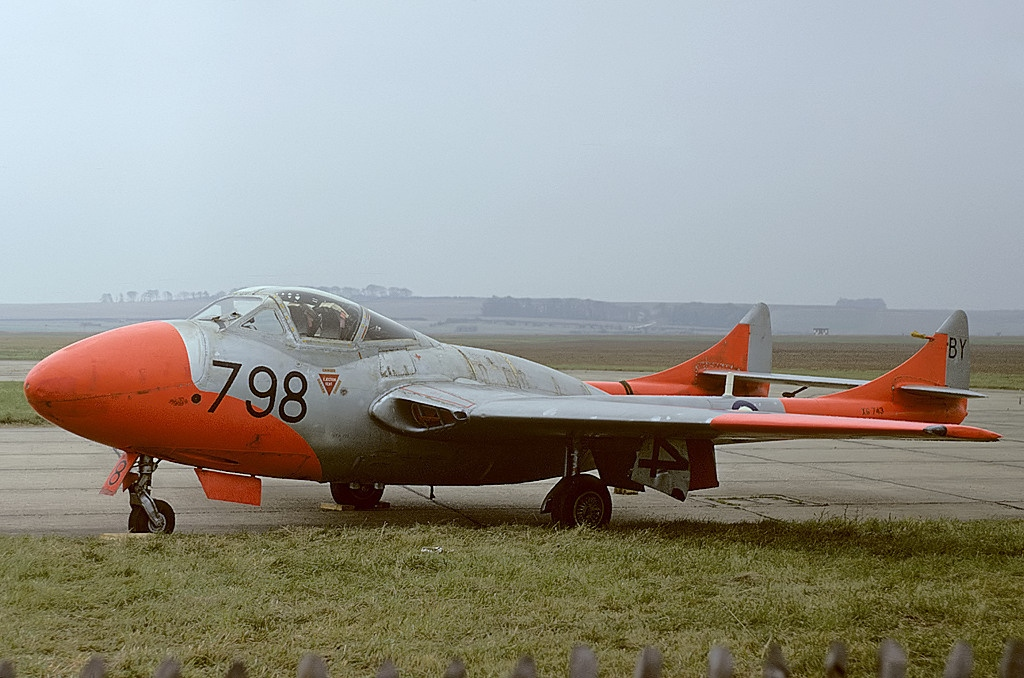
de Havilland Sea Vampire T22, XG743, BY-798, of the Station Flight at RNAS Brawdy

The Station Flight at Brawdy also included the Maintenance Test Pilot's School and flew a number of different aircraft types, including:

- de Havilland Dominie (Sep 1952 - Jul 1958)
- Hawker Sea Fury T.20 (Nov 1952 - Sep 1953)
- Avro Anson I (Dec 1954 - Feb 1956)
- de Havilland Vampire FB.5 (Feb 1955 - Sep 1956)
- de Havilland Sea Vampire T.22 (Feb 1955 - Jun 1970)
- de Havilland Tiger Moth (Jul 1956 - Dec 1969)
- Hawker Sea Hawk FGA.4 (Dec 1956 - Aug 1957)
- Gloster Meteor T.7 (Sep 1957 - Aug 1960)
- Hawker Sea Hawk FGA.6 (Nov 1959 - May 1960)
- Gloster Meteor TT.20 (Dec 1959)
- Percival Sea Prince T.1 (Jun 1961 - Sep 1970)
- Percival Sea Prince C.1 (Mar 1962 - Dec 1963)
- Hawker Hunter GA.11 (Sep 1964 - Jan 1965)
- Percival Sea Prince C.2 (Jul 1967 - Sep 1968)
- Supermarine Scimitar F.1 (Sep 1967 - Nov 1968)

== Royal Navy Station commanders ==
Note: The ranks shown are the ranks held at the time of holding the appointment of commanding officer, Royal Naval Air Station Brawdy.

RNAS Brawdy commanders
rank	name	from	to
Captain	R. E. N. Kearney, OBE, RN	Aug 1952	Jul 1954
Captain	D. C. E. F. Gibson, DSC, RN	Jul 1954	Jul 1956
Captain	F. Stovin-Bradford, DSC, RN	Aug 1956	Sep 1958
Captain	H. R. B. Janvrin, DSC, RN	Oct 1958	Jul 1959
Captain	E. S. Carver, DSC, RN	Jul 1959	Aug 1961
Commander	P. R. S. Bravn, MBE, RN	Aug 1961	Jan 1963
Captain	W. I. Campbell, RN	Jan 1963	Feb 1965
Captain	P. M. Austin, RN	Feb 1965	Mar 1967
Captain	A. B. B. Clark, RN	Mar 1967	May 1969
Captain	R. L. Everleigh, DSC, RN	May 1969	Dec 1970
Commander	P. B. Cowan, RN	Dec 1970	Mar 1971

== Heritage ==
=== Station badge and motto ===
Royal Naval Air Station Brawdy's own badge was awarded on 4 September 1952 when the air station was commissioned as HMS Goldcrest. When the Admiralty took control of Brawdy on 1 January 1946, it was known as HMS Goldcrest II, therefore, showing it was a satellite of HMS Goldcrest, which was RNAS Dale. With Dale closing, Brawdy was given its own badge, which had a Goldcrest perched on a branch. This related to a resting place for the bird after a flight.

Royal Air Force Station Brawdy had a new badge in 1984. It featured a Sea-Dragon, with one claw touching the Prince of Wales's feathers, and with the other claw holding the sword of RAF Strike Command. The upper body of the dragon was red, symbolising the Welsh Dragon, and the bottom half was azure blue, symbolising Brawdy's previous use by the Fleet Air Arm.

The station's Welsh motto is Amddiffynfa y Gorllewin; The English translation is 'Stronghold in the West'.

=== Gate guardians ===
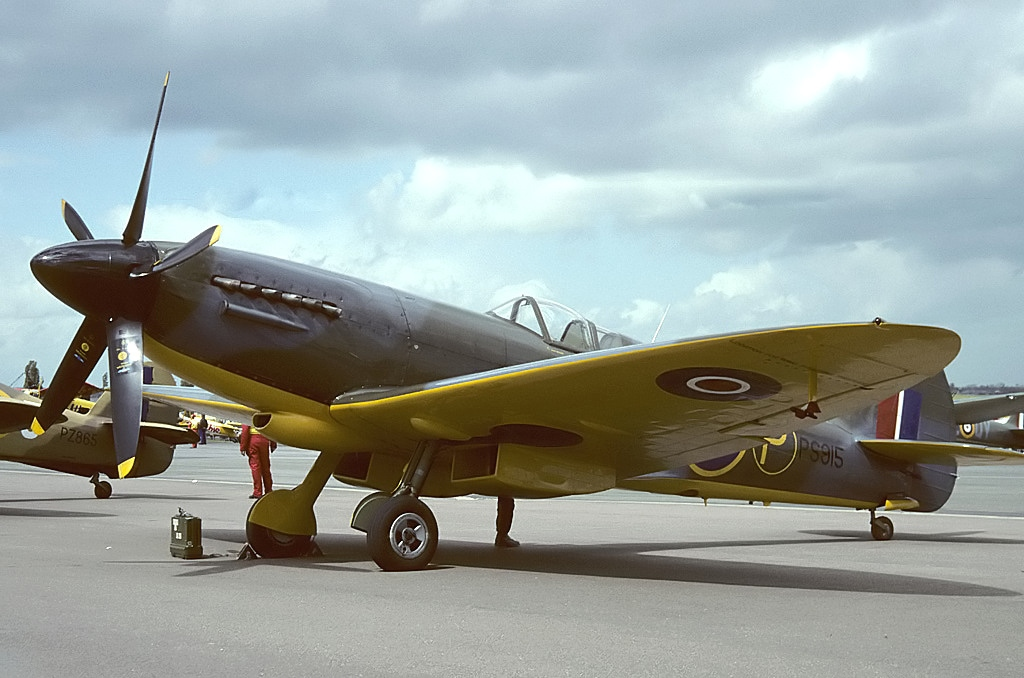
Supermarine Spitfire PRXIX, PS915

Brawdy had many gate guardians of several types of aircraft. Whilst under the control of the Fleet Air Arm, a de Havilland Vampire, a Hawker Sea Hawk, a Fairey Gannet and a Hawker Hunter in 738 NAS markings, were used.

Notable aircraft include: Hawker Sea Hawk FGA.6, XE340, which had the 'flying fish' markings of 898 NAS on its port side, and the 806 NAS 'Ace of Diamonds' on its starboard side. Supermarine Spitfire PRXIX, PS915, served as the gate guardian, before joining the Battle of Britain Memorial Flight. Hawker Hunter FGA.9, XE624, was put on display by the RAF, as a tribute after twenty-eight years' service, following Hawker Hunter 8565M,which had been painted in No. 43 Sqn markings.

== See also ==
- List of air stations of the Royal Navy
- List of former Royal Air Force stations
- RAF St Davids
- HMS Harrier (shore establishment)
