= Newgale, Pembrokeshire =

Coastal village in Pembrokeshire, Wales

Coordinates: 51°51′23″N 5°7′34″W

Newgale: Welsh: Niwgwl
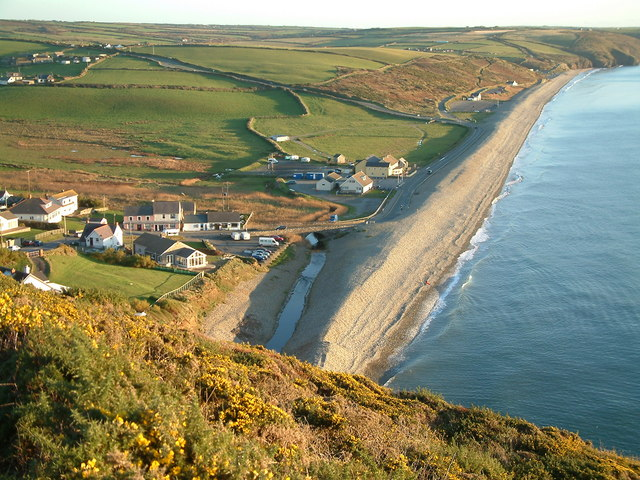
- Principal area: Pembrokeshire
- Preserved county: Dyfed
- Country: Wales
- Sovereign state: United Kingdom
- Post town: HAVERFORDWEST
- Postcode district: SA62
- Dialling code: 01437
- Police: Dyfed-Powys
- Fire: Mid and West Wales
- Ambulance: Welsh
- UK Parliament: Preseli Pembrokeshire

Newgale (Welsh: Niwgwl) is a village with an almost two-mile (3 km) stretch of beach in the parish of Roch, Pembrokeshire, West Wales. The beach is situated in the Pembrokeshire Coast National Park and on the Pembrokeshire Coast Path and has rugged coastal scenery with the path winding up and down the cliffs.

Newgale is one of over 40 Welsh Blue Flag beaches, which means it has the top certification for quality, cleanliness and facilities.

== Name ==
Newgale phonetically is rendered in Welsh as Niwgwl. It was recorded as Nivegal, Niwegal and Neugol in the 12th century, and the origin of the name may be Irish.

== Village and beach ==
The beach is backed by a large pebble bank which was created by a major storm on 25 October 1859, and which acts as a sea defence or storm beach; however, it is often breached, and rocks are washed onto the main road. In the January 2014 storms the sea washed the pebble wall across the road and a large wave washed the early evening Richards Bros bus into the adjoining field. Newgale is popular with holiday makers, windsurfers, surfers and canoeists throughout the summer months.

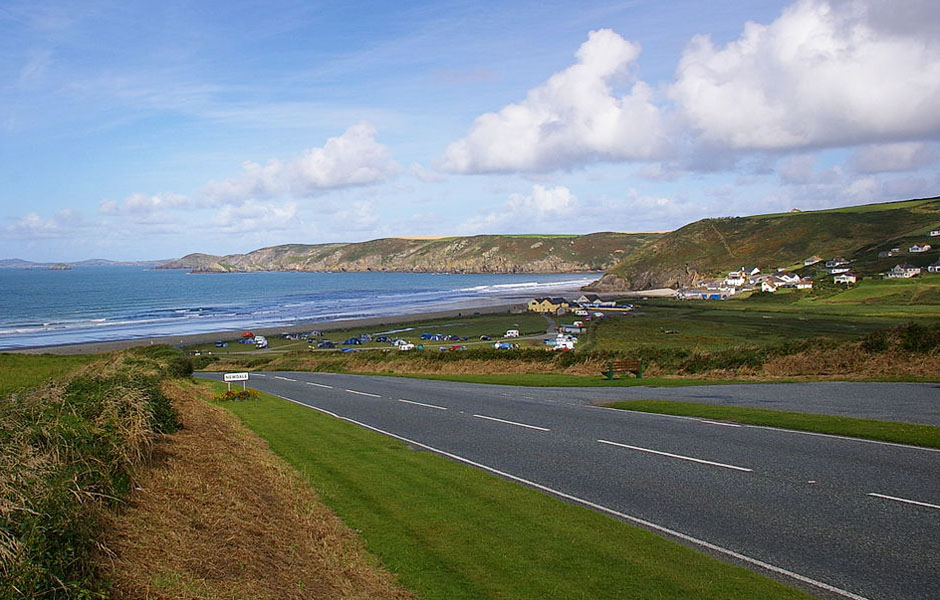
Newgale viewed from the A487 lay-by

There are two caravan parks, a camping site, some shops and a pub, The Duke of Edinburgh Inn. The surf at Newgale is good for beginners, with the waves usually backing off a bit even on large swell. Surfing is best on the rising tide.

The beach is a favourite place for the local people, who promenade on Boxing Day every year.

Many campers on lower ground experience flooding during rain in the summer months.

Newgale, along with Abereiddi, appeared in the music video for the Delerium (featuring Sarah McLachlan) song "Silence" in 2000.

Newgale marks a boundary between English and Welsh-speaking Pembrokeshire, with the next beach north of Newgale being called Pen-y-Cwm. A physical example of the boundary is Brandy Brook which runs through Newgale, splitting the English-speaking South Pembrokeshire and the Welsh-speaking North Pembrokeshire, remarked upon by Richard Fenton in his Historical Tour of 1810.

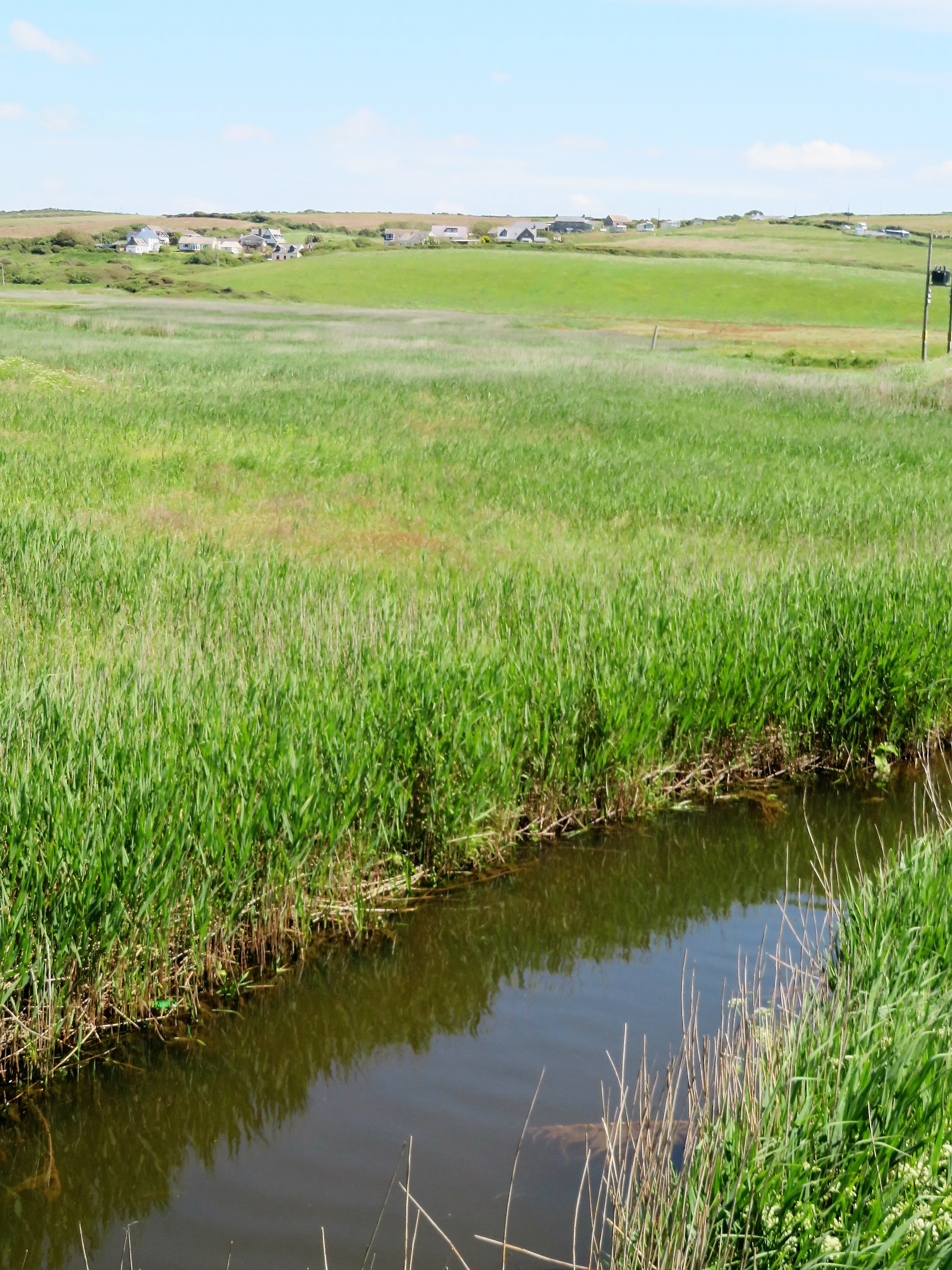
The landmark stream which passes through Newgale

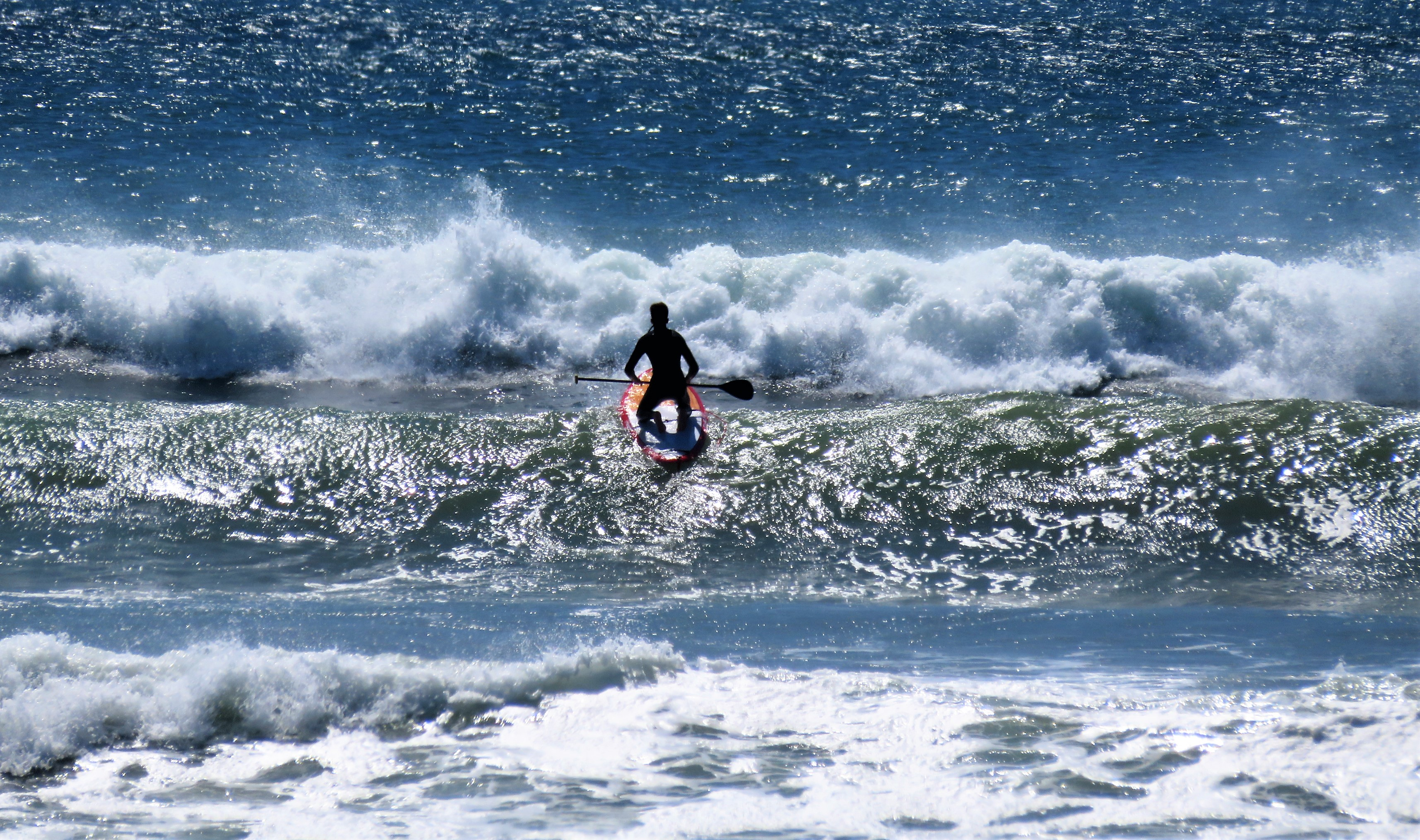
