= Stabilised Automatic Bomb Sight =

Royal Air Force bombsight used during World War II

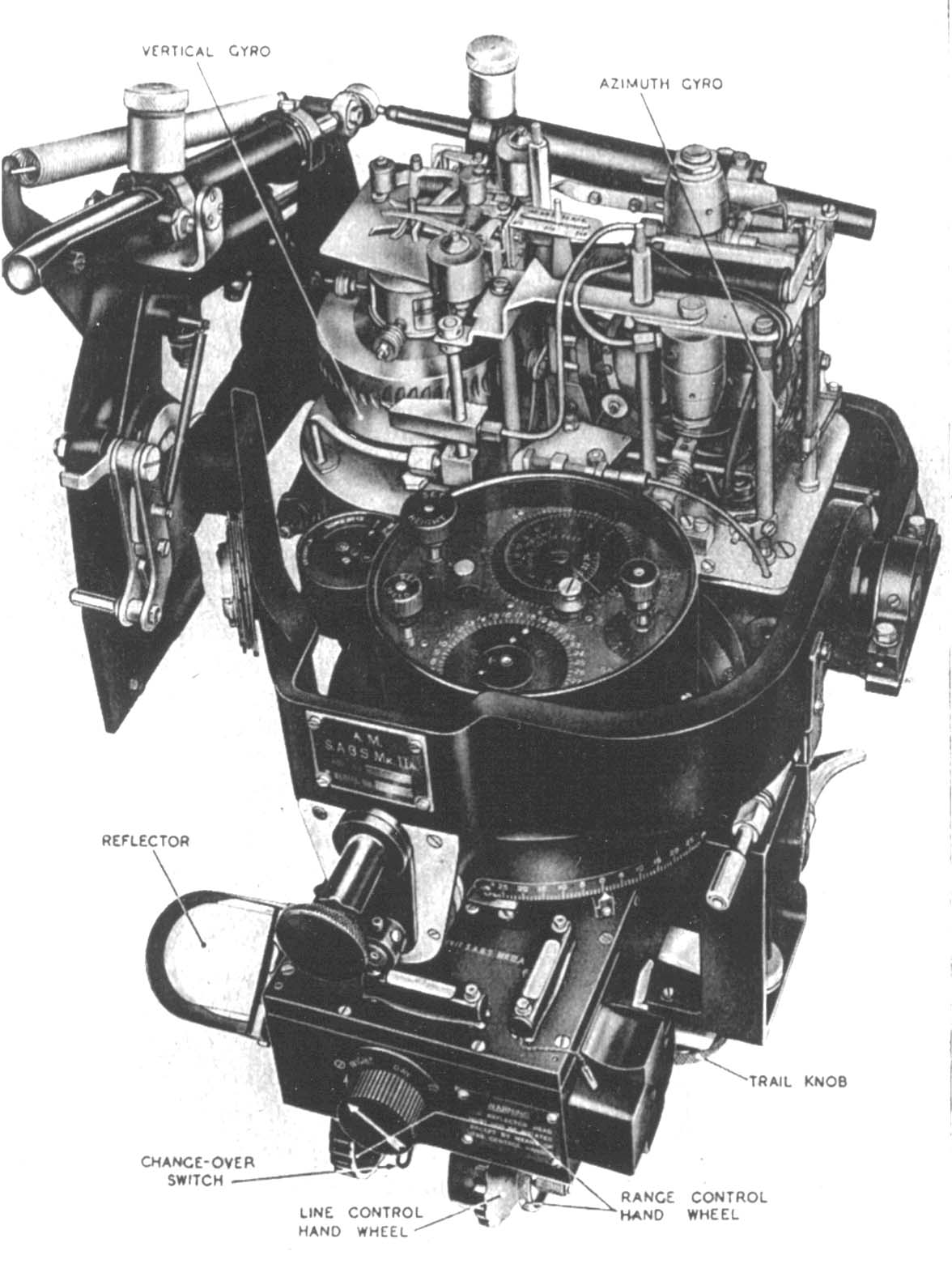
The Stabilised Automatic Bomb Sight was rather complex looking. The bombsight proper is the clock-like device in the centre, much of the framework around it is the stabilizer system that keeps it pointed at the ground while the aircraft moves.

The Stabilised Automatic Bomb Sight (SABS) was a Royal Air Force bombsight used in small numbers during World War II. The system worked along similar tachometric principles as the more famous Norden bombsight, but was somewhat simpler, lacking the Norden's autopilot feature.

Development had begun before the war as the Automatic Bomb Sight, but early bomber operations proved that systems without stabilisation of the bombsight crosshairs were extremely difficult to use under operational conditions. A stabiliser for the ABS began development, but to fill the immediate need for a new bombsight, the simpler Mark XIV bomb sight was introduced. By the time the SABS was available, the Mark XIV was in widespread use and proving good enough that there was no pressing need to replace it.

The SABS briefly saw use with the Pathfinder Force before being turned over to No. 617 Squadron RAF, starting in November 1943. This squadron's Avro Lancasters were undergoing conversion to dropping the 12,000 pounds (5,400 kg) Tallboy bomb as a precision weapon, and required the higher accuracy of the SABS for this mission. In this role the SABS demonstrated superb accuracy, routinely placing bombs within 100 yards (91 m) of their targets when dropped from about 15,000 feet (4,600 m) altitude.

Throughout its history, the system was produced only in small numbers, all built by hand. Ultimately the 617 was the only squadron to use the SABS operationally, using it with the Tallboy and the larger 22,000 pounds (10,000 kg) Grand Slam bombs. Some Avro Lincolns also were also fitted with SABS, but saw no operational use.

== Development ==
=== Vector bombsights ===
The basic problem in bombing is the calculation of the trajectory of the bomb after it leaves the aircraft. Due to the effects of air drag, wind and gravity, bombs follow a complex path that changes over time – the path of a bomb dropped from 100 metres looks different from the one when the same bomb is dropped from 5,000 metres.

The path was too complex for early systems to calculate directly, and was instead measured experimentally at a bombing range by measuring the distance the bomb travelled forward during its fall, a value known as the range. Using simple trigonometry, this distance can be converted into an angle as seen from the bomber. This angle is known as the range angle or drop angle. During the approach to the target, the bomb aimer sets their sights to that angle and then drops the bombs when the target passes through the crosshairs.

A basic system like this is missing one important factor, the effect of winds on the speed and course of the aircraft. The bombing range numbers are taken in still air, but in a wind the measured speed of the aircraft will not be the same as the one on the range. For instance, wind on the nose will reduce the ground speed of the aircraft, and cause bombs to fall short of the target.

Some early bombsights had adjustments that could account for wind directly on the nose or tail, but this seriously hampered operational use. Not only did it make attacks on moving targets like ships almost impossible unless they just happened to be moving in the same direction as the wind, it also allowed the anti-aircraft gunners to pre-sight their weapons along the wind line, knowing that aircraft would be flying that direction.

Using vector algebra to solve for the effect of wind is a common problem in air navigation, and its calculation was semi-automated in the Course Setting Bomb Sight of late World War I vintage. To use such a vector bombsight, the bomb aimer first requires an accurate measurement of the speed and direction of the wind. This was taken through a variety of methods, often using the bombsight itself as a reference. When these figures were dialled into the system, a mechanical calculator moved the sights fore or aft to account for the wind, as well as side-to-side to indicate the proper approach angle.

The accuracy of such systems was limited by the time taken to measure the wind in advance of the bomb run, and the care taken to calculate the results. Both were time consuming and error-prone. Moreover, if the measurement was incorrect or the wind changed, it was not obvious during the approach how to correct for this — changes to either wind speed or direction would have similar visual effects, but only one would place the bombs correctly. Generally, any inaccuracies had to be left dialled in, as attempts to correct them using the multi-step calculation procedure generally made matters worse. Even without such problems, a long bomb run was needed to ensure the aircraft was approaching along the correct line as indicated by the sights, often several miles long.

=== Tachometric designs ===
During the 1930s, advances in mechanical computers introduced an entirely new way to solve the bombsight problem. These sorts of computers were initially introduced for naval uses around the turn of the 20th century, later examples including the Admiralty Fire Control Table, Rangekeeper and Torpedo Data Computer. Fed a variety of inputs such as the angle to the target and its estimated speed, these systems calculated the future position of the target, the time that the ordnance would take to reach it, and from this, the angles to aim the guns in order to hit the target based on those numbers. They used a system of iterative improvements for the estimated values to calculate any measure that could not be made directly.

For instance, although it is possible to accurately measure the relative position of a target, it was not possible to directly measure the speed. A rough estimate could be made by comparing the relative motion of the ships, or by considering factors like the bow wave or speed of her propellers. This initial estimate was entered along with the measured location of the target. The calculator continually outputs the predicted position of the target based on the estimated motion from this initial location. If the initial speed estimate is inaccurate, the target will drift away from the predicted location over time. Any error between the calculated and measured values was corrected by updating the estimated speed. After a few such adjustments the positions no longer diverged over time, and the target's speed was accurately revealed.

This system of progressive estimation is easily adapted to the bombsight role. In this case, the unknown measurement is not the target's speed or heading, but the bomber's movement due to the wind. To measure this, the bomb aimer first dials in estimates of the wind speed and direction, which causes the computer to begin moving the bombsights to stay pointed at the target as the bomber moved toward it. If the estimates were correct, the target would remain motionless in the sights. If the sights moved away from the target, or drifted, the estimates for wind speed and direction were updated until the drift was eliminated.

This approach to measuring the wind had two significant advantages. One was that the measurement was taken while on the approach to the target, which eliminated any problems with the winds being measured long in advance and then changing by the time of the approach. Another advantage, perhaps more important, was that the measurement was made simply by aligning a sight on an object on the ground through a small telescope or reflector sight. All of the complicated calculations and setup of the vector designs were eliminated and the chance of user error along with it. These tachometric or synchronous bombsights were an area of considerable research during the 1930s.

=== Norden ===
The US Navy had found that bombsights were almost always used with the sights not properly levelled with respect to the ground, so any angles measured through the sight were wrong. An error of only a few degrees represents an error of hundreds of feet when bombing from high altitudes. Stabilization, which automatically levels the sight, was found to roughly double overall accuracy.

The Navy began the development of a gyroscopically stabilized sight with Carl Norden during the 1920s. Norden's solution used an existing bombsight mechanism known as an "equal distance sight" that was attached to a gyroscopic stabilizer system he developed. The Navy asked him to replace the bombsight with a tachometric design on the same stabilizer. He initially refused, but eventually took a sabbatical in Europe and returned with a workable design delivered for testing in 1931. The Norden bombsight demonstrated itself able to drop bombs within a few yards of its targets from altitudes between 4,000 and 5,000 feet (1,200 and 1,500 m). The Navy saw this as a way to attack ships from level bombers at altitudes outside the effective range of the ship-borne anti-aircraft guns.

The US Army Air Corps also saw the Norden as a potentially war-winning weapon. At a time when the US was firmly isolationist, military thinking was centred on repelling a seaborne invasion. With the Norden, USAAC bombers could destroy such a fleet while it was still hundreds of miles from shore. As the reality of war sank in, and it became clear the US would be involved in some fashion in attacks on foreign lands, the USAAC would go on to develop an entire strategic bombing concept based on using the Norden to attack factories, shipyards and other high-value targets.

News of the Norden filtered to the UK Air Ministry in 1938, shortly after they had begun development of their own Automatic Bomb Sight (ABS). The ABS was similar in concept to the Norden and offered similar accuracy, but it lacked the stabilization system and was not expected to be available before 1940. Concerted efforts to purchase the Norden ran into continual problems and increased frustrations between the two future allies. These negotiations were still ongoing, without result, when the war began a year later.

=== Mk. XIV ===
In early operations, RAF Bomber Command concluded that their existing bombsights, updated versions of the World War I-era CSBS's, were hopelessly outdated in modern combat. During low-level attacks, the bombers had only moments to spot the target and then manoeuvre for an attack, and often had to dodge fire all the while. When the bomber was turning, the bombsight, fixed to the frame of the aircraft, pointed out to the sides and could not be used to adjust the approach.

On 22 December 1939, at a pre-arranged meeting on bombsight policy, Air Chief Marshal Sir Edgar Ludlow-Hewitt stated flatly that the CSBS did not meet RAF requirements and asked for a bombsight that would allow the bomber to take any sort of evasive action throughout the bomb run. This, in effect, demanded the use of stabilization in order to allow the bomb aimer to continue making adjustments while the bomber manoeuvred.

At that time the ABS was still at least a year away from production. It did not support stabilization; adding this feature would further the delay. The Norden was considered a good solution, but the US Navy still refused to license it or sell it for RAF use. Both offered more accuracy than was really needed, and neither was going to be available immediately.

Accordingly, in 1939 the Royal Aircraft Establishment started examining a simpler solution under the direction of P.M.S. Blackett. These efforts produced the Mark XIV bomb sight. The Mk. XIV moved the calculator from the bombsight itself to a separate box, which also included instruments that automatically input altitude, airspeed and heading, eliminating the manual setting of these values. In general use, the bomb aimer simply dialled in estimates for the wind direction and speed, set a dial to select the type of bomb being used, and everything from that point on was entirely automated.

Although relatively complex to build, production was started in both the UK and US, and the new design quickly equipped most of Bomber Command by the time of the large raids starting in 1942. Although it was a great improvement over the earlier CSBS, it was by no means a precision sighting system, later being referred to as an "area sight".

=== SABS ===
Although the Mk. XIV served the RAF's basic needs, the requirement for a more accurate sight remained. This need became more pressing as the earthquake bomb concept was pushed forward, a system that demanded more accuracy than the XIV could provide. In 1942 the Norden was still not available for license, in spite of it being used on US bombers arriving in the UK to attack Germany, thereby eliminating the Navy's primary argument that it should not be given to the RAF as it might fall into German hands.

In response, earlier concepts of mating the ABS to a new stabiliser platform were carried out to produce the SABS. Like the Norden, the stabiliser was separate from the bombsight proper, although in the case of SABS the stabiliser moved the entire ABS bombsight, rather than just the aiming reticle as in the Norden. Unlike Norden, the SABS's stabiliser did not serve double-duty as an autopilot, as RAF bombers were already equipped with one. Instead, directional corrections from the bomb aimer were sent to a pilot direction indicator in the cockpit, similar to the original Norden models.

=== Operational use ===
Small numbers of SABS became available in early 1943 and were initially sent to No. 8 Group RAF, the "Pathfinder Force". They used them only briefly before turning their examples over to No. 617 Squadron RAF, who were in the process of converting to the earthquake bomb and required higher accuracy than the Mk. XIV could provide. SABS was used operationally for the first time by No. 617 on the night of 11/12 November 1943 for their attack on the Anthéor railway viaduct at Saint-Raphaël, Var in southern France. No hits on the viaduct were recorded by any of the ten 12,000 lb (5,400 kg) Blockbuster bombs.

SABS was used both for direct aiming during daylight missions, and for aiming at target indicators dropped by other aircraft flying at much lower levels at night. In the latter cases, the accuracy of the drops was dependent on the accuracy of the marking, which varied. For instance, during attacks on the V weapon launch site at Abbeville on 16/17 December 1943, Tallboys were dropped with a CEP (circular error of probability) of only 94 yd (86 m), a superb result, but the markers were 350 yd (320 m) from the target. Better results followed; on the night of 8/9 February 1944, Wing Commander Leonard Cheshire visually dropped markers on the Gnome et Rhône factory in downtown Limoges; 11 Lancasters then dropped a combination of 1,000 lb General Purpose and 12,000 lb Blockbuster bombs directly on the factory, with the last falling in the river beside it. The factory was knocked out of the war, with few or no civilian casualties.

General accuracy improved dramatically as the crews gained proficiency with the system. Between June and August 1944, 617 recorded an average accuracy of 170 yd (160 m) from 16,000 ft (4,900 m), a typical bombing altitude, down to 130 yd (120 m) at 10,000 ft (3,000 m). Between February and March 1945 this had further improved to 125 yd (114 m), while Air Marshal Harris puts it at only 80 yd (73 m) from 20,000 feet (6,100 m). Two other precision-bombing squadrons formed up during this period, but used the Mk. XIV. These squadrons were able to achieve 195 yd (178 m), an excellent result that offered performance roughly equal to the early SABS attempts, and far outperforming the average result by the more famous Norden.

The SABS' best-known role was in the sinking of the German battleship Tirpitz on 12 November 1944, by a combined force from 617 and No. 9 Squadron RAF. Known officially as Operation Catechism, 30 Lancasters attacked the Tirpitz at altitudes from 12,000 to 16,000 feet (3,700 to 4,900 m). At least two bombs from 617 hit the Tirpitz, (Note: Due to the clouds of smoke and spray from the target, the exact number of hits is subject to debate. Bishop quotes Bobby Knight of the 617 describing three of the first four bombs from the squadron hitting various locations on the ship. However, other sources only credit two hits.) causing it to capsize in the fjord it was hiding in. Another celebrated attack was made during daylight on 14 June 1944 against the E-boat pens at Le Havre. One bomb penetrated the roof of the heavily guarded base, knocking it out of the war.

=== Tiger Force ===
As the war in Europe wound down, plans were made to start a strategic bombing campaign against Japan as Tiger Force. Requiring long range, Tiger Force planned on using the new Avro Lincoln bombers, along with other designs whose range would be extended using aerial refuelling.

As less than 1,000 SABS had been delivered, supplies for the new force were hard to come by. A great debate broke out in the RAF about the relative merits of the two bombsights; although the SABS was more accurate, the Mk. XIV was generally easier to use and offered greater tactical flexibility. In the end the point was moot, as the war ended before Tiger Force was deployed.

Those Lincolns that were equipped with SABS, including those of 9 and 44 Squadron, continued use in the post-war era. The SABS were not used after the Lincolns were withdrawn from service, replaced by the English Electric Canberra jet bomber and other types. The Canberra had initially been designed with no optical bombsight at all, relying entirely on H2S radar. The required version of the radar was not ready when the aircraft began to arrive, and they were redesigned to carry a bombsight. For this role the Mk. XIV was selected instead of the SABS. The Canberra carried an advanced internal navigation computer which continually output the wind direction and speed, and it was easy to adapt to the Mk. XIV to accept these inputs and thereby eliminate most of the remaining inaccuracy. The Mk. XIV, having been designed to accept external inputs from the start, was much easier to adapt to this role.

== Description ==
The SABS consisted of three primary parts, the bombsight itself, also known as the "range unit", the stabilizing system, and the "bombing directional indicator" for the pilot and other indicators.

=== Range unit ===
The range unit was the heart of the SABS, and the earlier ABS. This was a mechanical calculator with three internal functions.

The first calculated the angular rate of motion of a stationary location on the ground, which provided the ground speed of the aircraft, and output this to a reflector sight mounted on the left side of the bombsight. The key component of this system, and other tachometric designs, was the ball-and-disk integrator. This is a form of continuously variable transmission that allowed an output shaft to be driven at a controlled speed relative to an input. The input was normally attached to some sort of value to be measured, say the height of water in a sluice, and as it moved up and down, the output rotation of the disk sped or slowed. The total number of turns of the output shaft was an integrated version of the input.

The SABS version of the integrator worked with two values, one for the height over the ground, and the second for the airspeed. Both used a ball-and-disk system, the output of the height disk feeding the input of the airspeed. Both were driven from a single constant-speed electrical motor. The range control wheel was fed into the speed calculator, adjusting it in a similar fashion. (Note: It is also the case that the rate of motion of the sight should increase as the bomber approaches the target - consider the angular rate of motion of an airliner seen at long range as opposed to directly overhead. AP1730A does not contain any mention of this effect nor indicates any method for correcting it. A linkage from the sight drive shaft back to the height input is shown in several of the diagrams in AP1740A, but does not appear to work in this way.)

The two other calculations concerned the ballistics of the bombs.

To account for the effects of terminal velocity and thus the actual time it took for the bombs to reach the ground, the "bomb class" input moved a pointer over the altitude gauge. Selecting the altitude against this pointer changed the height setting to account for this portion of the ballistics problem. So, for instance, if a given bomb had a lower terminal velocity than another it would take longer to reach the ground, which is the same as the other bomb being dropped from a slightly higher altitude. Adjusting the altitude accounted for this.

After bombs are released, drag causes them to fall behind the motion of the aircraft. By the time they reach the ground, the aircraft is hundreds or thousands of feet in front of the impact point. This distance is known as trail. The SABS adjusted for trail by simply tilting the entire range unit aft on a trunnion, rather than sending adjustments into the calculator itself. If the aircraft is crabbing to adjust for any winds from the side, this also causes the trail to move to the side—the bombs are falling straight down although the aircraft is actually flying sideways into the wind and imparts this velocity to the bombs. To account for this side trail, the sight was rotated to one side or the other.

The range unit also contained the bomb release mechanism. On the bombsight, this was an electrical contact system attached to the same output shaft as the sight, and a second contact connected to the cam-based trajectory calculator. The two contacts, along with automatic indicator slides, one for the viewing angle of the bombsight to the target, the other to the calculated drop angle at the bomb release point, would approach each other as the bomber flew towards the target, and completed the release circuit at the right moment for the drop. The same system also included a set of contacts that connected earlier, turning on a red lamp on top of the bombsight and another in front of the pilot. These remained lit through the approach, for about ten minutes, and turned off the instant the bombs were released.

The sight was driven electrically from the aircraft's 24 V DC power supply. This powered both the sight rotation motor as well as various lamps and the electrical contacts that triggered the bombs to drop.

=== Stabiliser ===
The stabiliser unit consisted of two parts, a box containing two gyroscopes, and a pneumatically powered frame that kept the range unit flat in comparison to the ground. In modern terminology this would be known as an inertial platform.

One advantage of the SABS compared to similar devices like the Norden was the automatic "erection" system. Gyroscopes have no preferred direction of rotation and will hold whatever angle they initially started up in. In the Norden, adjusting the gyros to an absolute "up" required a time consuming operation that could take as long as eight minutes. The SABS solved this with a pendulum mechanism consisting of a weight on the end of an L-shaped bracket. The weight caused the bracket to be pulled vertically, and if the gyro was not level, the bracket pressed against the side of the gyro's shaft, forcing it in the appropriate direction.

The gyros were connected to air valves on an associated supply line. This lowered or raised the pressure on one side of a servo piston, the other side being attached to the original supply without passing through the valve. Any precession of the gyros, due to movement of the aircraft, caused the pistons to move due to the differential pressure. This motion was smoothed by an oil-filled dashpot, one for each of the three servos.

The entire ABS sat within the stabilised frame that was powered by the servos. The platform had fairly wide range of motion, between 20 and 25 degrees off horizontal. This allowed it to track properly through a wide range of motions.

The stabiliser was powered by a 60 lb compressed air feed, fed from the same unit that also powered the automatic pilot. The system took considerable time to stabilize, the vertical gyro taking as long as 15 minutes to reach full speed.

=== Autopilot ===
Very near the end of the war, Arthur Harris asked the Air Ministry to begin investigating adapting the SABS to support an autopilot like the American models. Another request was the addition of variable magnification in the sighting system that could be changed at will. Neither modification made it into service.

== Using the SABS ==
Using the SABS was a relatively straightforward procedure; although a number of steps were involved, these took place in sequence and left the bomb aimer with relatively easy tasks and low workload on the final approach.

=== Initial setup ===
Prior to the mission, or early on in flight, bomb data was entered on two settings dials on the top of the range unit. These set the trail scale and bomb class letter, estimating the amount the bomb would slow in forward motion (trail) and how quickly it would reach the ground due to the effects of terminal velocity (class). These settings were not changed during the mission.

=== During the approach ===
At least fifteen minutes before the bomber reached the target, the pilot would open valves to supply air to the bombsight. The bomb aimer would then start up the stabilizer platform, and wait as the gyros reached full speed. At this point the stabilizer platform was turned on and the bombsight was ready for use.

As the bomber levelled off on its final approach, the bomb aimer would then dial in the altitude and air speed to the ground speed calculator, based on values provided by the pilot or navigator. He could also dial in approximate values for the wind speed and drift, typically provided by the navigator. Providing initial estimates for these values somewhat simplified the bomb run.

If the bomber was releasing a "stick" of bombs, the bomb aimer was instructed to use the "false height" method to control the timing of the drop, i.e. deliberately mis-enter the altitude in order to drop early.

=== During the run ===
At some point the target would become visible to the bomb aimer, and he would use the range control wheel to rotate the reflector sight to point towards the target. Two range wheels were connected to the same shaft, a large one for fine movements, and a much smaller one that could be rapidly spun for this initial target pickup. Once the target was roughly centred in the sight, the change-over switch was thrown and the sight started rotating to track the target. This started the official bomb run.

As the bomber approached the target, any mis-estimate of the wind would cause the sight to drift past or under the target. Further adjustments of the fine-gained range control wheel would bring the sight back in-line with the target, as well as update the estimated windspeed. Typically only a few adjustments like this were needed to cancel out any range drift.

If the bomber was to one side of the target, or drifting away from the proper approach, the line control wheel was used to rotate the entire sight to place the crosshair back on the target. Simply flying at that angle will not bring the bomber back along the proper approach, it will cause the bomber to fly parallel to the correct line. In order to re-capture the approach, the bomber has to turn past the correct heading and erase the accumulated error, then turn back onto the proper line.

To accomplish this, the SABS multiplied the error angle by four times before sending it to the pilot's display. By chasing the dial, the pilot automatically overcorrected the heading, bringing the aircraft back towards the proper approach. As the bomb aimer updated measurements to the drift angle, it would reduce this error back to zero. As in the range case, only a few adjustments were needed to cancel out any sideways drift.

=== During and after the drop ===
At this point the bombsight now has an accurate measurement of the true motion of the aircraft. This does not imply that it is accurately measuring the wind, as the initial inputs for airspeed or altitude might have been wrong. But this makes no difference in terms of the drop; as long as the sight's crosshairs remain on target, the motion over the ground is correctly measured and the bombsight will operate correctly.

Setting the bomb type and trail moves a cam within the unit carrying several electrical contacts to a fixed angle. As the bomber approaches the target, a metal ridge attached to the sight rotation shaft depresses the first contact, turning on the drop timing lights. Further motion causes the bombs to release. A final stop turns off the motor when the sight is fully vertical, if the bomb aimer has forgotten to do so.

=== Measuring wind ===
The SABS also offered a secondary function as a windage measurement tool for accurate navigation. By simply tracking any suitable object on the ground with the range and line control wheels the wind speed and direction would be returned on the range unit's dials. Several methods were outlined for use at different altitudes and operational conditions.

== See also ==
- Lotfernrohr 7, a similar German design of late-war vintage
