= Mark XIV bomb sight =

Bombsight used by the RAF during World War II

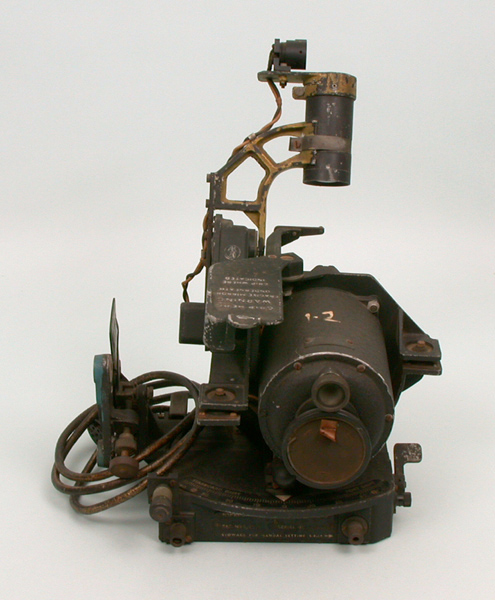
The Mk. XIVA sighting head, which would be mounted in the front of the aircraft and connected to the computor by the cables coiled up on the left. This example is found in the RAF Museum's reserve collection.

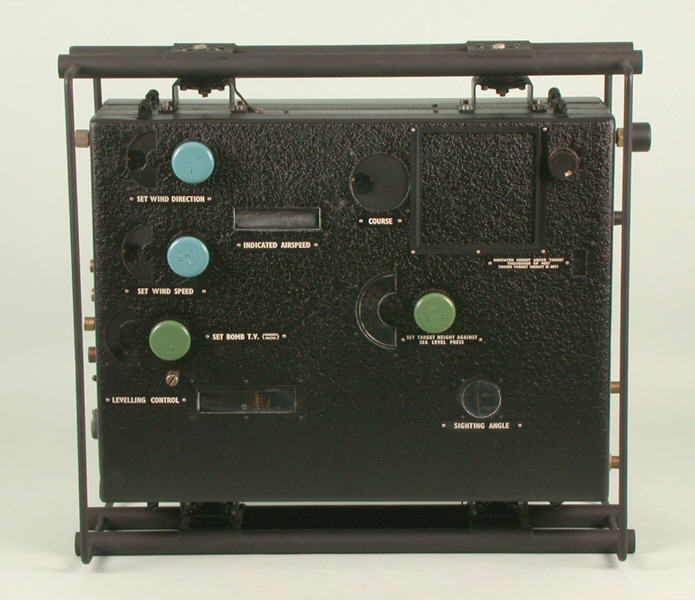
The Mk. XIVA computor, normally mounted on the left side of the forward fuselage. The wind speed and direction are set on the blue dials, the bomb's terminal velocity and the target altitude on the green dials.

The Mark XIV Bomb Sight (Note: The British military at that time used Roman numerals to denote the sequence of models (i.e. progressive versions) of military equipment. Hence this was the fourteenth model of bombsight in a line starting with the original CSBS Mk. I.) was a bombsight developed by Royal Air Force (RAF) Bomber Command during the Second World War. It was also known as the Blackett sight after its primary inventor, P. M. S. Blackett. Production of a slightly modified version was also undertaken in the United States as the Sperry T-1, which was interchangeable with the UK-built version. It was the RAF's standard bombsight for the second half of the war.

Developed starting in 1939, the Mk. XIV began replacing the First World War–era Course Setting Bomb Sight in 1942. The Mk. XIV was essentially an automated version of the Course Setting sight, using a mechanical computer to update the sights in real-time as conditions changed. The Mk. XIV required only 10 seconds of straight flight before the drop and automatically accounted for shallow climbs and dives. More importantly, the Mk. XIV sighting unit was much smaller than the Course Setting sight, which allowed it to contain a gyro stabilization platform. This kept the sight pointed at the target even as the bomber manoeuvred, dramatically increasing its accuracy and ease of sighting.

The Mk. XIV was theoretically less accurate than the contemporary Norden bombsight. However, it was smaller, easier to use, faster-acting, and better suited to night bombing. In practice, it demonstrated accuracy roughly equal to the Norden's. It equipped the majority of the RAF bomber fleet during the second half of the war; small numbers of the Stabilized Automatic Bomb Sight and Low Level Bombsight, Mark III were used in specialist roles. The Low Level Bombsight was built using parts of the Mark XIV, stabilized in pitch rather than roll.

A post-war upgrade, the T-4, also known by its rainbow code Blue Devil, connected directly to the Navigation and Bombing System computers to automate the setting of wind speed and direction. This eliminated the one potential inaccuracy in the system, further increased accuracy, and simplified operation. These equipped the V Bomber force as well as other aircraft until their retirement from service in the 1960s.

== History ==
=== Course-setting sights ===
A problem with early bombsights was that they could only correct for the effects of the wind in a simple way and required the bomber to fly directly up- or down-wind from the target, to minimise the complexity of the required calculations. This made it difficult to attack moving targets and allowed anti-aircraft artillery to sight their weapons along the wind line.

In 1917 Harry Wimperis introduced the Course Setting Bomb Sight (CSBS), which replaced the tables and timings used in earlier sights with a simple mechanical calculator capable of solving the sideways drift due to the wind. As the bomb aimer turned a wind direction knob, the main portion of the sight was pushed to the left or right, indicating the required angle to fly to take the aircraft over the target. The CSBS was the first bombsight that allowed the bomber to approach the target from any direction, which offered greatly increased tactical freedom.

The downside to the CSBS was that the settings, made through four main input dials, were useful for one operational setup, a given altitude and heading. If the aircraft manoeuvred, the entire system had to be reset. Additionally, the system required the bomber's direction to be compared to objects on the ground, requiring a time-consuming process sighting through thin metal wires against a suitable object on the ground below. As the sight was not stabilized, any manoeuvres to correct for misalignment interfered with the ability to measure the heading, so these corrections further extended the bomb run. The CSBS generally required the bomber to fly straight and level for a lengthy time.

Although the need for an improved CSBS was known in the 1930s, little work on developing such a sight was carried out. That was because an entirely new class of tachometric bombsights were being developed, which offered dramatically improved accuracy and automated much of the setup. The RAF was working on such a design, the Automatic Bomb Sight, but development was slow and it had not been accepted for use when the war started. Learning of a similar design developed by the US Navy, the Air Ministry began extensive negotiations in an effort to gain a production licence for this Norden bombsight. The US Navy constantly refused these requests, deeming it too sensitive to risk losing over Germany, and their refusals ultimately led to significant political friction between the two nations. Ironically, the plans of the Norden bombsight had been passed to the German military by a US-based spy in 1938.

As the war started, revised versions of the CSBS, the Mk. VII and Mk. IX, remained universal. The Mk. X, a more extensive improvement, was in mass production and being readied for service entry.

=== A pressing need ===
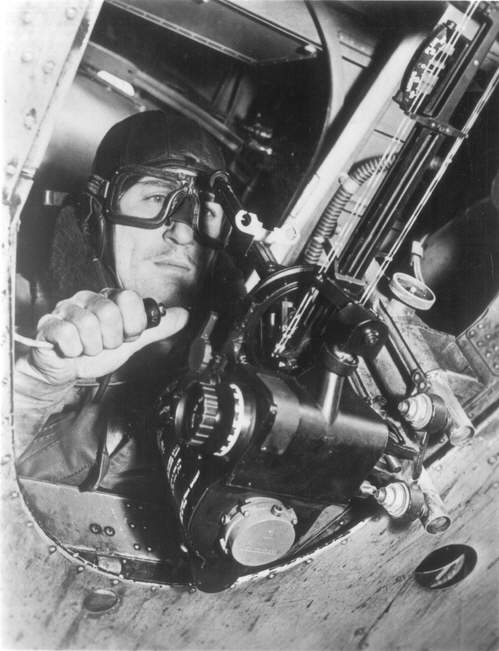
The CSBS required the aircraft to remain level while the bomb aimer watched the drift along the thin parallel wires (white).

On 28 March 1939, the head of RAF Bomber Command Air Chief Marshal Sir Edgar Ludlow-Hewitt hosted a conference on the state of Bomber Command. Among the many problems with operational readiness, he noted that RAF bombs were much too small and that bombsight technology was obsolete. Given the problems of obtaining a modern bombsight, he pressed for the creation of a high-speed bomber design that could safely attack at low levels.

On 18 December 1939, Vickers Wellington bombers carried out a raid on German shipping in what became known as the Air Battle of the Heligoland Bight. Detected on radar and engaged en route to their targets, over half the attacking force was destroyed or damaged beyond repair. Ludlow-Hewitt presented a report on the attack on 22 December 1939, noting that flying straight and level for the CSBS made the bombers easy targets for fighters and anti-aircraft gunners. He again pressed for a new bombsight that featured stabilization to allow the aircraft to manoeuvre while it approached the target.

The CSBS and the improved version, the Mk. X, were insufficient, as both were too large to easily stabilize. Because of the way it was built, the Automatic Bomb Sight could be equipped with a stabilizer but it was estimated that it would be some time before it could be modified and brought into production. The Norden did offer stabilization but it also required relatively long setup times and was still not available for purchase.

Another solution to the vulnerability of the RAF bombers was to fly at night, which was taken up as the primary tactic of Bomber Command. The Mk. X proved to be very difficult to read at night and bombers that carried it were quickly refitted with the earlier Mk. VII or Mk. IX sight. The Norden was unable to work at night at all; the bomb aimer had to locate the target long in advance of the drop point using a built-in telescope and targets were simply not visible at the required distances in low light.

What was needed was a new bombsight, one that could be very quickly set up, had useful illumination of the crosshairs for night use, and was stabilized so the bomb aimer could watch the approach as the bomber was manoeuvring. An early attempt was the Mk. XI, which mounted a cut-down CSBS on the front of a gyro unit taken from a Sperry Gyroscope artificial horizon, to provide stabilization in the horizontal plane, useful for aiding drift measurements and corrections. But it was no easy task to manually calculate the range angle on the separate Course and Speed Calculator. It was introduced in 1941, but only a small number were produced. (Note: An image of the Mk. XI is available at this page.)

=== Blackett's solution ===
The request for a new bombsight was quickly passed on to the Royal Aircraft Establishment, where Patrick Blackett of the Aeronautical Research Committee volunteered to lead the effort. (Note: Hore suggests that Blackett had already taken up development of the new bombsight of his own accord.) His solution to the problem was a thorough revision of the CSBS concept. (Note: It is not clear from existing sources whether or not Blackett was also responsible for the Mk. XI. The only source to mention the Mk. XI is Bombs and Armament but it fails to note its origins.)

The advance in the Blackett design was the way the sighting head was aimed. Instead of dialling the parameters into the sight directly as in the CSBS, these inputs were dialled into a separate console. The console was equipped with repeaters for each of the aircraft instruments needed to operate the sight, like altitude and airspeed. The operator simply turned the dials on the console so their indicator arrows matched the readings on the instruments displayed in the same location, known as laying needle on needle. This reduced the possibility that the numbers would not be changed as the bomber manoeuvred, but required so much manual working that a new crew member was introduced to operate the console, the bomb-aimer's mate.

The inputs operated by the bomb-aimer's mate drove a mechanical calculator inside the console, or computor. The output of the calculator drove flexible shafts that rotated the sight head to the proper angles in azimuth and altitude, representing the wind drift and range angle. The sight head replaced the older wire crosshairs with a modern reflector sight that was easy to see at night. The sight could be rotated manually to view objects well in front of the aircraft, allowing the bomb aimer to select among a wider variety of objects to use for drift measurements.

With the CSBS, the sighting system and calculator were the same device, which required the bombsight to be fairly large. With this restriction removed, the sight head was much smaller and lighter than the older versions. The resulting sight head was easy to mount on a stabilizer system, adapted from the same Sperry gyroscope as earlier experiments. With the sight head stabilized, the bomb aimer could continue to measure drift even as he indicated turns to the pilot, eliminating the need to correct, re-measure and correct again. The remote console and second operator eliminated the need for the bomb aimer to look away from the sights, to make adjustments while on the bomb run. As a result of these changes, short aiming periods of a few seconds would be enough for an accurate drop.

The new Mk. XII bombsight was first tested in September and October 1940 and by the end of October, 20 examples had been built. A slightly improved version, the Mk. XIII was designed but not put into production.

=== Automation ===
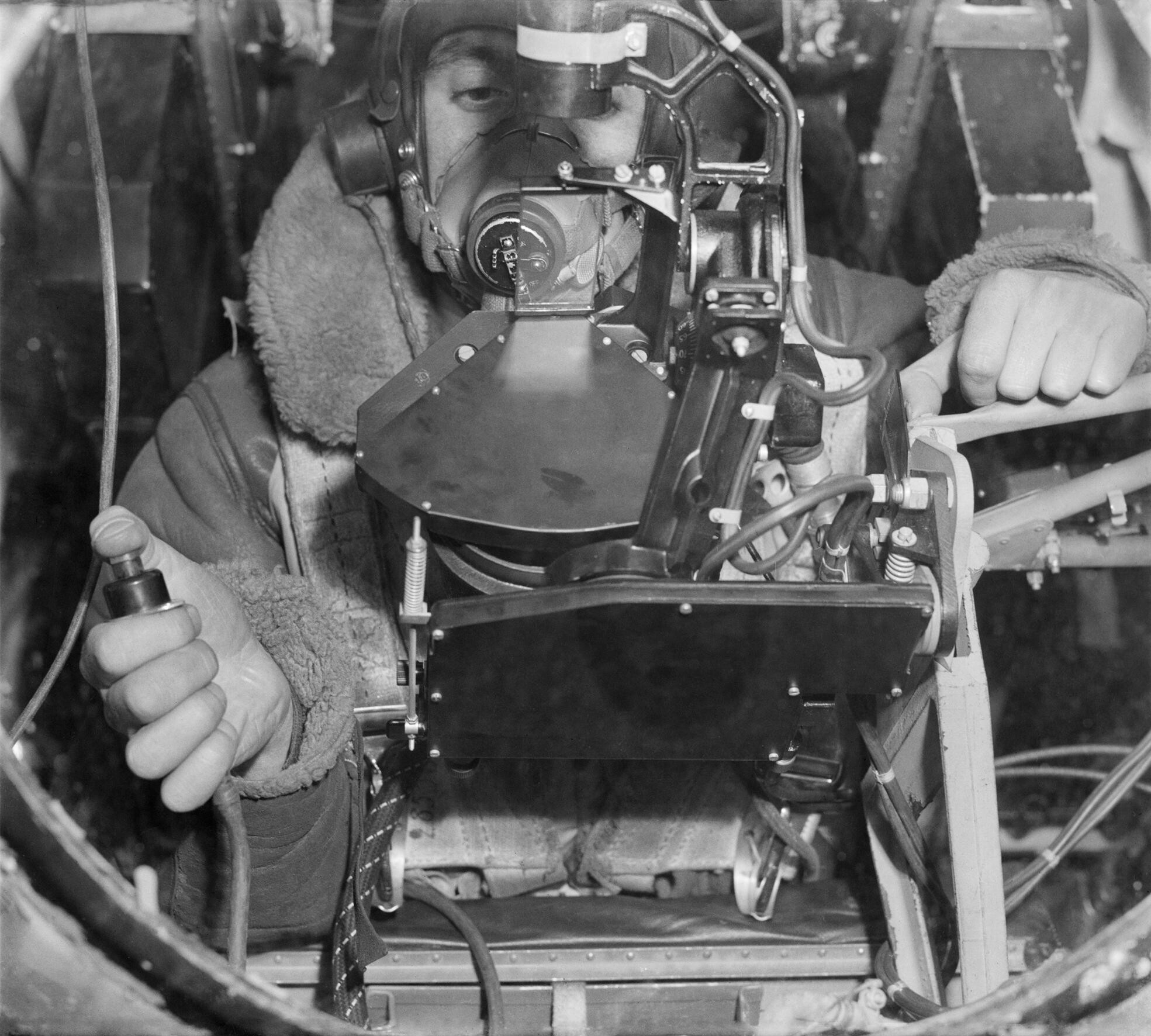
Bomb aimer on an Avro Lancaster demonstrating use of the Mark XIV

The need for the second crewman was an obvious problem with the Mk. XII, especially as few bombers of the era had enough room for the operator. Working with Henry Braddick, Blackett developed a new version of the calculator that included aircraft instruments inside the computor, eliminating the need for the needle-on-needle matching and completely automating the calculations. After the initial design was complete, Blackett moved onto other matters with RAF Coastal Command, where he continued development of his theories of operational research. (Note: Although it is not mentioned specifically, sources suggest that Braddick led the development of the Mk. XIV.)

The new design reduced the bomb aimer's setup workload to dialling in four settings. Two of these could be set before the mission: the altitude of the target above sea level and the terminal velocity of the bomb, a function of the particular bomb being used on that mission. The only settings that had to be adjusted in flight were the measured wind direction and speed. The altitude, airspeed and course were all measured by the internal instruments and presented to the user in windows on the side of the computor case. Once set, the computor would automatically update the calculations and display the resulting bombing angle in another window. The computor could even account for steady changes in altitude, allowing the bomb run to take place in a shallow climb of up to 5 degrees or dive of up to 20 degrees.

The resulting Mk. XIV was first tested in June 1941. It was the first modern bombsight that allowed for accurate bombing immediately after radical manoeuvring, with a settling time as little as 10 seconds. The fast settling time was invaluable during night bombing missions, as it allowed the bomber to fly a corkscrew (a helical path), climbing and turning, and then level out immediately before the drop. Even slow turns made it difficult for night fighters to track the bombers within the limited view of their radar systems and continually changing altitude was an effective way to avoid anti-aircraft fire.

The Mk. XIV was not as accurate as the Norden at altitudes over 20,000 feet (6,100 m), but for typical night bombing altitudes from 12,000–16,000 feet (3,700–4,900 m), any differences in accuracy were minor. When the need for more accuracy for use with the Tallboy bombs arose in 1943, the Stabilized Automatic Bomb Sight (SABS), a development of the earlier Automatic Bomb Sight, was introduced in limited numbers.

=== Production and use ===
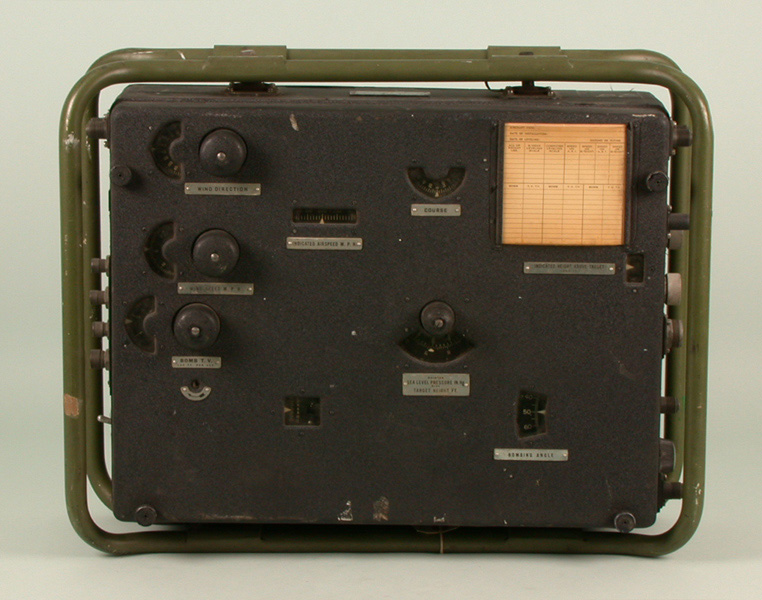
The T-1A computer, a US-built version of the Mk. XIVA computor. This example retains the scales in the reading windows and a blank levelling card.

Existing sources do not record when the Mk. XIV went into production in the UK; operational testing started in January 1942, and production examples started reaching squadrons in March. It was manufactured by small machine shops and instrument makers like the Aron Meter Company. Production was too slow to meet the demand; between July and October, fewer than a hundred a month were being delivered. As the design was finalized, automated production was undertaken and by mid-1943, 900 a month were available. This was enough to equip the heavy bombers as they arrived from the production lines and by late 1942 the Handley Page Halifax was being delivered with the sight head already installed.

To fill the demand for other aircraft, especially smaller ones like the de Havilland Mosquito, the Air Ministry began looking at US manufacturers to supply the bombsight. Frederic Blin Vose of Sperry Gyroscope expressed an interest in the design and felt he could adapt the Mk. XIV to US production methods and have it in mass production rapidly. Sperry arranged for AC Spark Plug to take over manufacture, initially on a sub-contract basis and later for direct sales to the UK.

The two companies made some basic changes to the design to make it easier to produce and a final design was ready in May 1942. The Sperry T-1 was fully compatible with UK-built versions and a T-1 computer could be used with a Mk. XIV sight head or vice versa. Full production commenced at the AC plant in Flint, Michigan, in November and T-1s arrived in the UK from March 1943. The sights were sent to medium bombers like the Wellington, while UK-built versions were sent to the heavy bombers. In August 1943, George Mann of AC Spark Plug visited the UK for a period of about a year, liaising with RAE Farnborough, Boscombe Down and the Ministry of Aircraft Production.

=== Later versions ===
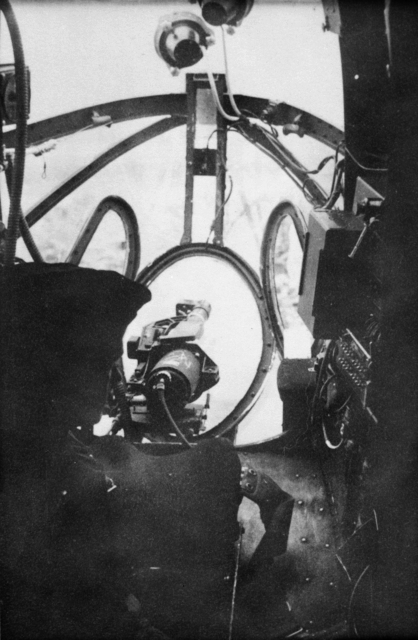
Mk. XIVA in a Handley Page Halifax in its stowed position with the collimator handle rotated forward and the metal plate over the glass sight

In May 1943, the Commander-in-Chief of Bomber Command, Air Chief Marshal Sir Arthur Harris, requested that the maximum bombing altitude be increased from 20,000 to 30,000 feet (6,100 to 9,100 m), as the Avro Lancaster units were now carrying out missions as high as 22,000 feet (6,700 m). The Air Ministry responded with a compromise improvement of 25,000 feet (7,600 m) and a more accurate angle mechanism. These changes produced the Mk. XIVA, which arrived in December 1944. The A model also introduced the ability for the minor differences in instrument readings for indicated and true air speed between aircraft to be corrected simply by replacing a cam.

The original design powered its gyros by blowing air across their outer rim, using ambient air from the cabin that was being sucked out of the aircraft by a hose connected to a vacuum source, provided by a venturi or a pump on the engine. These were (and remain) widely used for attitude indicators and gyrocompasses. Running these hoses to the stabilizer gyro in the sight head was problematic, so the new Mk. XIVB and T-1B replaced the suction-powered gyros with electrical ones, eliminating the need for a separate connection. This was introduced with the 18,000th T-1 on the AC production line.

The Mk. XV was a version designed for the Royal Navy and Coastal Command for attacking submarines. As these operations took place at low altitudes, even small changes of altitude air pressure could lead to large errors in calculations. The Mk. XV allowed the altitude input to be taken directly from a radar altimeter, eliminating these inaccuracies and any instrument lag. The Mk. XVII was a Mk. XV modified for the very high attack speeds of the Naval Mosquito at more than 400 mph (640 km/h). As the Naval Mosquito did not have a bomb aimer's position, an unstabilized version of the sight head was mounted in front of the pilot. (Note: Why the stabilizer was removed is not mentioned in the available sources.)

=== Post-war use ===
In the post-war era, the UK produced derivatives of the design based on the T-1, as opposed to the original Mk. XIV. These T-2 and T-4 (Blue Devil) designs had much higher altitude, airspeed and wind-speed settings, suitable for high-altitude bombing in the jet stream. These were normally part of the Navigation and Bombing System, which combined inputs from aircraft instruments, H2S and Green Satin radars, star fixes and radio navigation systems. These measurements were fed into a mechanical computer that directly output the latitude and longitude of the aircraft, based on automatic dead reckoning. The same outputs were also sent to the sighting head of the T-4, eliminating the need to manually set the windage and providing those values with much higher accuracy (about ±0.1 mph and ±0.1 degrees).

Most wartime optical sights like the Mk. XIV were useless for operations in jet aircraft. Flying at roughly twice the altitude and three times the speed of their wartime antecedents, the range—the distance the bombs travelled after being dropped—increased from perhaps 2 miles (3.2 km) to as much as 7 miles (11 km). This long range, plus the additional altitude, made the distance between the target and aircraft so great that it was often impossible to see the target before the aircraft had already passed the drop point. Optical bombing gave way to radar bombing, and the Mk. XIV was withdrawn from RAF service in 1965.

== Description ==
=== Basic mechanism ===
The Mk. XIV consisted of two independent parts, the sighting head and the computor. The sighting head was located in the bomb aimer's window at the front of the aircraft. The separate computor cabinet was assembled with the operating knobs positioned on the right side of the case, so it had to be placed on the left side of the fuselage. The two were connected via two flexible cable drives.

The computor cabinet included only four main controls. On the left side of the chassis, from top to bottom, were dials that set the wind direction, wind speed, target altitude and terminal velocity of the bomb. All these inputs were set by reading their value in a small window on the left side of the dials. Additional windows provided output values for the indicated airspeed, course, and bombing angle (or range angle). Clips in the upper right held a card with levelling data, as well as notes about the sight or the bombs being dropped. The computor was also connected to several external sources. Compressed air was supplied from the engines to drive the mechanism, and an exhaust allowed the less dense used air to escape. Tubes were also connected to the pitot tube and static air source, which allowed the accurate measurement of airspeed. A separate electrical connection input the direction measured on the distant reading compass, using a selsyn.

The CSBS had introduced a mounting system on the left side of the bombsight that allowed it to be easily removed and then replaced without affecting its levelling. The Mk. XIV was designed to mount to this same system, which it did by mounting all the moving parts on a square platform that then connected to the mount. A small thumbscrew on the mount allowed it to be levelled if needed, checked against a spirit level mounted just above it. A release lever beside the thumbscrew allowed the entire assembly to be lifted off the mounts.

Above the mounting platform was the stabilization gyro. This was connected to a pie-wedge-shaped metal plate, causing the plate to rotate around a mounting point at the top of the wedge. The rear part of the reflector sight was mounted at this point and the opposite, forward, end was supported by a rotating pintle inserted into a gudgeon mounted to the frame. Rolling the aircraft caused the gyro to rotate in the same direction, which was geared to cause the opposite motion in the reflector. As the sights worked by reflecting light off the reflector in the centre, motion of the mirror would result in twice the motion of the aim point. To address this, the gyro was attached through levers with a 2-to-1 reduction.

The reflector sight mechanism was mounted in front of the gyro, slightly to the left. A metal flap protected the half-mirror from damage when the sight was stowed. The flap was rotated rearward during use, covering the spirit level. The collimator was mounted on a prominent arm that projected above and in front of the sight when in use, and folded forward when stored. Electrical power was provided to light the collimator as well as the drift scale, which indicated the angle to fly to correct for the wind drift.

=== Operation ===
The main design feature of the Mk. XIV was that it gave the bomb aimer more time to work on the problem of bringing the aircraft to the proper location to drop the bombs. As the calculations of this location were being carried out automatically, he could concentrate solely on the sight throughout the bomb run. The sight projected crosshairs into space at infinity so the user could focus their eyes on the target and see sharp lines superimposed on it.

The vertical line on the sight was relatively short, and could not be used directly to measure drift – unlike the long drift wires of the CSBS it replaced. To address this, the collimator handle could be used to manually rotate the sighting assembly forward, allowing the bomb aimer to point the sight further in front of the aircraft's location. This allowed the bomb aimer to select any convenient object on the ground for drift measurements, including the target itself, long before the aircraft reached it. Through periodic movements of the handle, the bomb aimer could ensure the drift line continued to pass through the target. When the handle was returned to the resting position and released, the shaft to the computor automatically re-engaged and started tracking the proper range angle again. The handle was also used to rotate the collimator forward for storage.

Many of the figures used in the calculation of the bomb's trajectory were based on fixed values, and were entered before the mission started. In particular, the terminal velocity was based on the type of bomb being dropped and did not change during the mission. This was used to calculate how steep the path of the bomb would be when dropped from high altitudes; at lower altitudes and airspeeds, the bomb did not reach terminal velocity and followed a more parabolic path. Other measures were entered only as the aircraft approached the target.

=== Measuring wind ===
The only major measurement that could not be made automatically or before the mission was the determination of the wind speed and direction. These change over time, and also due to changes in location, altitude, or wind shear. This demanded an accurate determination of the wind in the general area of the target, and would normally be highly inaccurate if dialled in at the mission start. Taking this measurement while nearing the target was an important procedure on the CSBS; its manual included several methods of determining the wind speed. The manual for the Mk. XIV described only one method of determining the wind speed, equivalent to the most complex of the procedures from the CSBS model.

Prior to the bomb run the pilot was directed to fly the aircraft in several different directions in sequence, preferably about 120 degrees apart. On each leg, the bomb aimer used the reticle to measure the drift angle, either by rotating the wind direction dial on the computor to get the sight head to the right angle, or by unlocking the azimuth control from the computor and turning the sight manually. The drift angle was whatever angle the sight head was pointing when objects on the ground could be seen to be moving along the line on the sight. Once measured, the angle of the aircraft and the angle of the drift (measured either from the dial on the computor or the scale on the sight) were recorded. Using the Mk. III Navigation Computor, the RAF's version of the modern E6-B flight computer, the three sets of angles were entered on the wind calculator face. This normally resulted in a small triangular area forming where the three lines came close to meeting, and the centre of this triangle revealed the wind speed and direction. This value was then entered into the computor.

=== Other details ===
As the Mk. XIV could calculate the effects of a shallow climb or dive (or glide as it is referred to in bombing), the computor included its own levelling mechanism. This was added to the range angle calculated by the computor to move the sight head. Levelling the system required adjustment of both the computor and the sight head. Since these were in a fixed relationship to each other, levelling could be carried out on the ground and then left alone. Any adjustments required were recorded on a card fixed to the front of the computor.

As the computor held the level line and was sending angle commands to the sight, it eliminated the need for a two-axis gyro in the sighting head itself. The gyro on the sight head only adjusted for rotation of the aircraft around its roll axis.

The bomb sight was also supplied with the Emergency Computor, a simple circular slide rule for use when the main computor stopped working. In this case the bomb aimer would dial in the same basic parameters on the various disks, and read out the proper sighting angle at the bottom. (Note: See image here.) Wind had to be estimated and calculated by hand. The angles were then entered manually into the sight; the drive cables were clutched out, the aiming angle entered using the operating handle, and the drift angle set by a small locking screw.

A separate switchbox was used to control the brightness of the lamps driving the drift scale and reticle.

== Accuracy ==
In testing on the bomb range, the Mk. XIV demonstrated an average accuracy of 130 yards (120 m) from 10,000 feet (3,000 m) altitude. In service, the average systematic error was 300 yards (270 m), while the random error was 385 yards (352 m). (Note: If one measures the location of all the impact points in a test bomb run, you can determine two types of error. If the locations are averaged to produce a "mean impact location", it may be offset from the target point. This is the systematic error and generally indicates a problem in the aiming of the bombs. If one measures the distance of each bomb from that mean location and then calculates the standard deviation, the dispersion or random error is produced, which is generally due to other factors like differences between the ballistics of the bombs.) In comparison, units using the much more complex Stabilized Automatic Bomb Sight (SABS) improved the systematic error to 120 yards (110 m) under the same operational conditions and altitude.

A series of reports in the summer of 1944 produced by Bomber Command's operational research division attempted to explain these differences, starting with problems in the bombsight itself. Almost all the reasons ultimately offered were purely operational in nature. These included the fact that the target indicator flares used as a reference covered an area of 400 by 500 yards (370 by 460 m), that the bombers were dropping salvos of bombs, not a single test bomb, and that the Master Bomber would change the marking point during the process of the raid, making it very difficult to correlate the bomb craters to the marking.

The difference between bombing results on the test range and in operational conditions was by no means unique to the Mk. XIV. At the same time the US was introducing the Norden, which had consistently demonstrated a circular error probable (CEP) of 75 feet (23 m) in testing, but produced an average CEP of 1,200 feet (370 m) during missions in 1943. As was the case with the Mk. XIV, most of the difference was traced to operational factors like crew training and visibility over the target. Through various changes in operational technique, CEP had improved to 900 feet (270 m) by 1945.

A later report covering the use the Tallboy bomb was able to directly compare the performance of the Mk. XIV and SABS in similar mission profiles. Eliminating bombs that fell far from the target as gross errors, those that fell near the target were twice as close to it when using SABS. Additionally, the number of gross errors with the Mk. XIV was double that of the SABS. The report noted that this additional accuracy did not confer any sort of superiority because the Mk. XIV's tactical freedom in terms of manoeuvring offset any advantage when a long bomb run was not possible. They also noted that a mission using SABS to drop bombs on a target marker would not be any more accurate than the Mk. XIV.

== See also ==
- Norden Bombsight, a similar vintage USAAF bomb sight
- Stabilized Automatic Bomb Sight, a contemporary bomb sight used for precision bombing by the RAF
- Low Level Bombsight, Mark III. a Coastal Command bombsight that used some of the Mk. XIV's components.
