= Norden bombsight =

Targeting device on US bombers during World War II, Korean War, and Vietnam War

External videos
- The Norden Bombsight: Principles
- The Norden Bombsight: Operation
- The Norden Bombsight: Preflight Inspection
- The Norden Bombsight: Conduct of a Mission
- The Norden Bombsight: The Leveling System

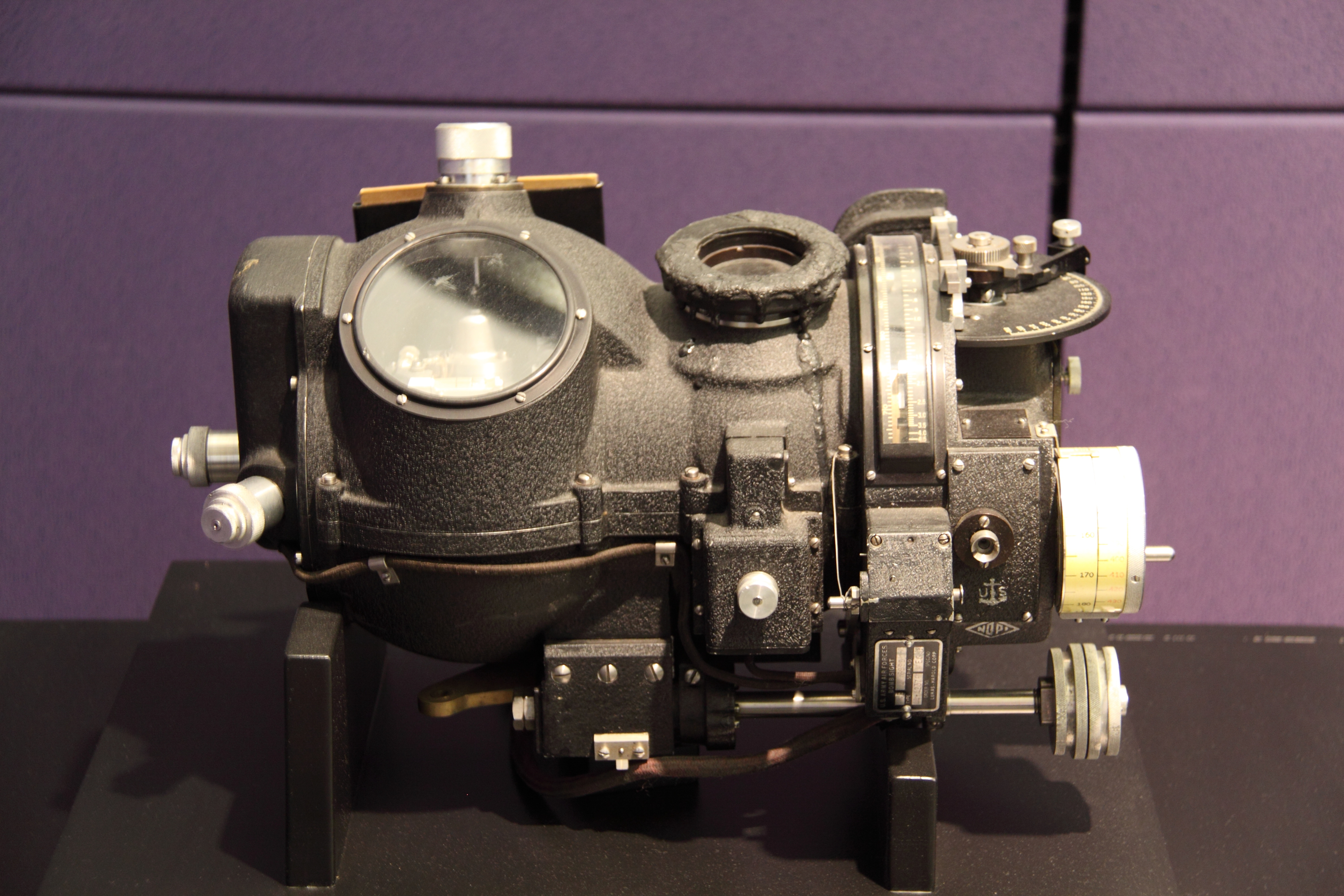
The Norden bombsight at the Computer History Museum in Mountain View, California. This example is only the bombsight itself; it does not include the associated autopilot that would normally connect to it on the bottom.

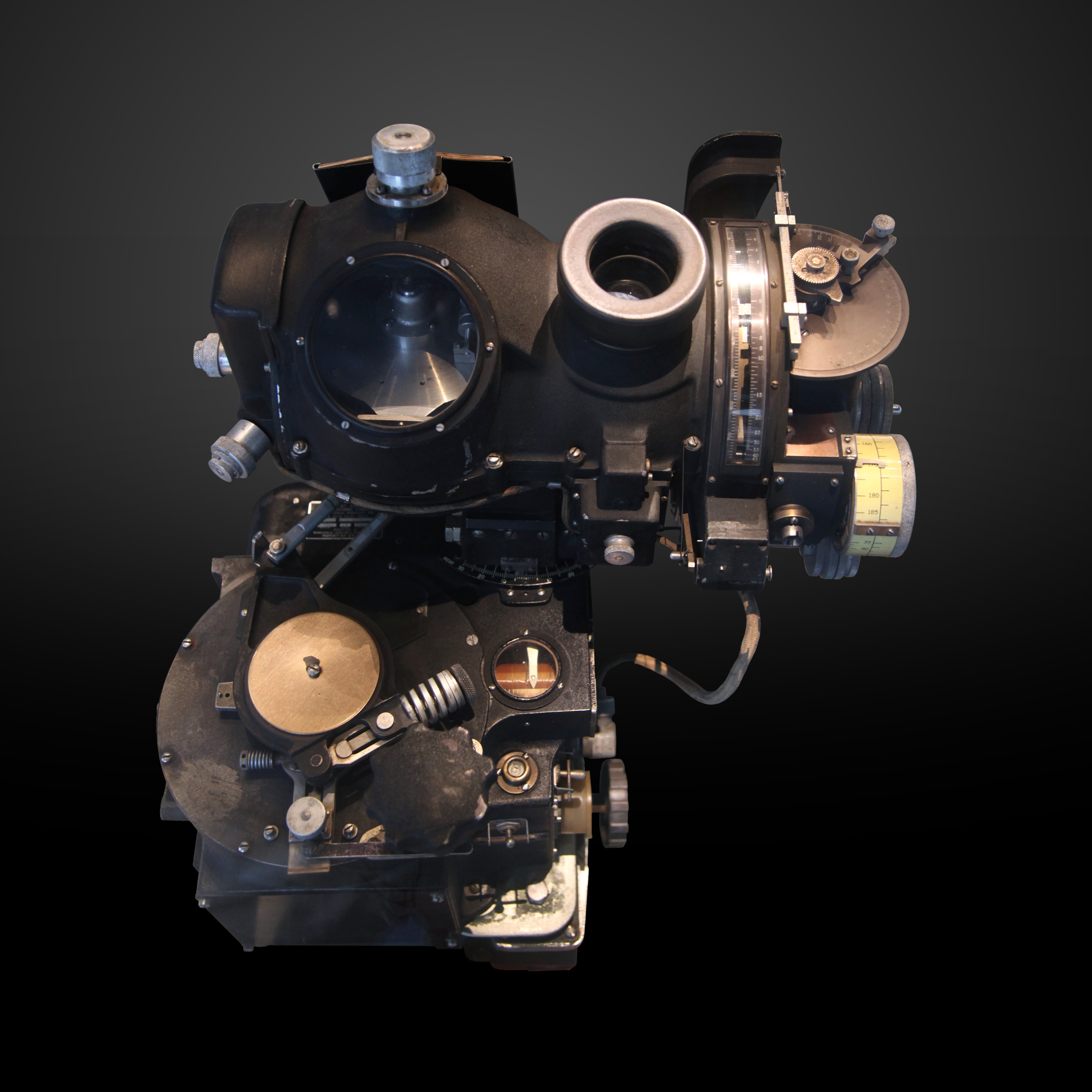
Norden bombsight on display at the Imperial War Museum in Duxford, with the stabilizer assembly attached

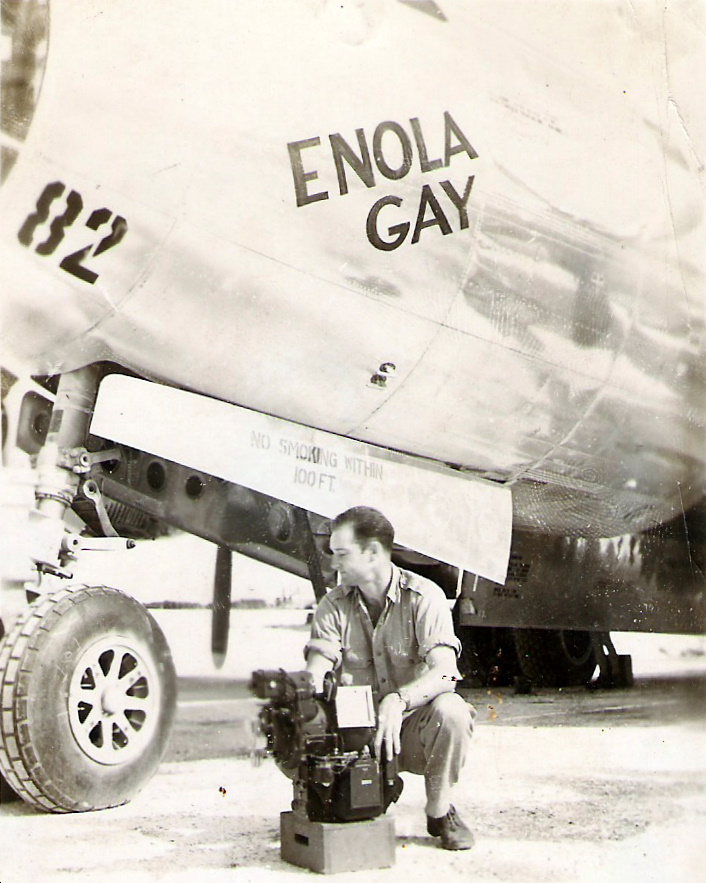
Enola Gay bombardier Thomas Ferebee with the Norden bombsight on Tinian after the dropping of Little Boy

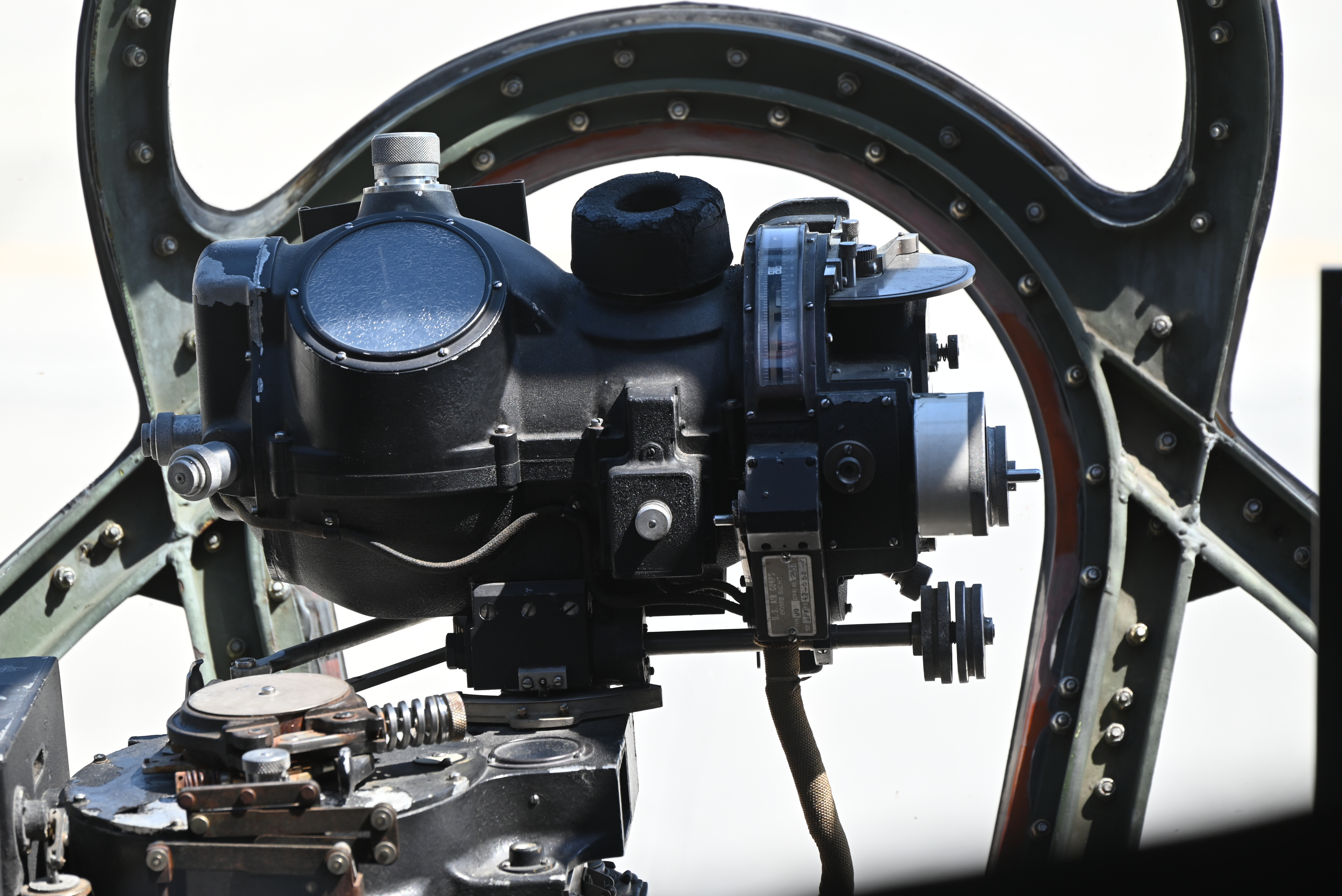
A Norden bombsight in the nose of the B-29 FIFI

The Norden Mk. XV, known as the Norden M series in US Army service, is a bombsight that was used by the United States Army Air Forces (USAAF) and the United States Navy during World War II, and the United States Air Force in the Korean and the Vietnam Wars. It was an early tachometric design, which, by incorporating optics, a mechanical computer, and an autopilot for the first time, could not only identify a target but also fly the airplane to it. The bombsight directly measured the aircraft's ground speed and direction, which older types could only estimate with lengthy manual procedures. The Norden further improved on older designs by using an analog computer that continuously recalculated the bomb's impact point based on changing flight conditions, and an autopilot that reacted quickly and accurately to changes in the wind or other effects.

Together, these features promised unprecedented accuracy for daytime bombing from high altitudes. During prewar testing the Norden demonstrated a 150-foot (46 m) circular error probable (CEP), (Note: CEP is a circle into which 50% of the bombs should fall.) an astonishing performance for that period. This precision would enable direct attacks on ships, factories, and other point targets. Both the Navy and the USAAF saw it as a means to conduct successful high-altitude bombing. For example, an invasion fleet could be destroyed long before it could reach US shores.

To protect these advantages, the Norden was the subject of utmost secrecy well into the war and of a production effort on a scale similar to that of the Manhattan Project: the overall cost (both R&D and production) was $1.1 billion (equivalent to $15 billion in 2024), as much as 2/3 of the latter or over a quarter of the production cost of all B-17 bombers. The Norden was not as secret as believed; both the British SABS and German Lotfernrohr 7 worked on similar principles, and details of the Norden had been passed to Germany even before the war started.

Under combat conditions the Norden did not achieve its expected precision, yielding an average CEP in 1943 of 1,200 feet (370 m), similar to other Allied and German results. Both the Navy and Air Forces had to give up using pinpoint attacks. The Navy turned to dive bombing and skip bombing to attack ships, while the Air Forces developed the lead bomber procedure to improve accuracy, and adopted area bombing techniques for ever-larger groups of aircraft. Nevertheless, the Norden's reputation as a pin-point device endured, due in no small part to Norden's own advertising of the device after secrecy was reduced late in the war.

The Norden saw reduced use in the post–World War II period after radar-based targeting was introduced, but the need for accurate daytime attacks kept it in service, especially during the Korean War. The last combat use of the Norden was in the US Navy's VO-67 squadron, which used it to drop sensors onto the Ho Chi Minh trail in 1967. The Norden remains one of the best-known bombsights.

== History and development ==
=== Early work ===
The Norden sight was designed by Carl Norden, a Dutch engineer educated in Switzerland who immigrated to the US in 1904. In 1911, Norden joined Sperry Gyroscope to work on ship gyrostabilizers, (Note: Different sources disagree on Norden's time at Sperry. Most place him there between 1911 and 1915, Moy and Sherman state he left in 1913, and Moy implies he worked there since 1904.) and then moved to work directly for the US Navy as a consultant. At the Navy, Norden worked on a catapult system for a proposed flying bomb that was never fully developed, but this work introduced various Navy personnel to Norden's expertise with gyro stabilization.

World War I bomb sight designs had improved rapidly, with the ultimate development being the Course Setting Bomb Sight, or CSBS. This was essentially a large mechanical calculator that directly represented the wind triangle using three long pieces of metal in a triangular arrangement. The hypotenuse of the triangle was the line the aircraft needed to fly along in order to arrive over the target in the presence of wind, which, before the CSBS, was an intractable problem. Almost all air forces adopted some variation of the CSBS as their standard inter-war bomb sight, including the US Navy, who used a modified version known as the Mark III.

It was already realized that one major source of error in bombing was levelling the aircraft enough so the bombsight pointed straight down, even small errors in levelling could produce dramatic errors in accuracy. The US Army did not adopt the CSBS and instead used a simpler design, the Estoppey D-series, as it automatically levelled the sight during use. Navy experiments showed these roughly doubled accuracy, so they began a series of developments to add a gyroscopic stabilizer to their bombsights. In addition to new designs like the Inglis (working with Sperry) and Seversky, the Navy also asked Norden to provide an external stabilizer for the existing Mark III designs.

=== Mark III-A ===
Although the CSBS and similar designs allowed the calculation of the proper flight angle needed to correct for windage, they did so by looking downward out of the aircraft. Very simple bombsights could be operated by the pilot, but as their sophistication grew they demanded full-time operators. This task was often given to the front or rear gunner. In Army aircraft they would sit near enough to the pilot to indicate any required directional adjustments using hand signals, or if they sat behind the pilot, using strings attached to the pilot's jacket.

The Navy's first bombers were large flying boats, where the pilot sat well away from the front of the fuselage, and one could not simply cut a hole through the hull for the bombsight to view through. Instead, the bombs were normally aimed by an observer in the nose of the aircraft. This made communications with the pilot very difficult. To address this, the Navy developed the concept of the pilot direction indicator, or PDI, an electrically-driven pointer that the observer used to indicate which direction to turn. The bombardier used switches to move the pointer on his unit to indicate the direction of the target, which was duplicated on the unit in front of the pilot so he could maneuver the aircraft to follow suit.

Norden's attempt to fit a stabilizer to the Mark III, the Mark III-A, also included a separate contract to develop a new automatic PDI. Norden proposed removing the electrical switches used to move the pointer and using the entire bombsight itself as the indicator. Instead of the thin metal wires that formed the sights on the Mark III, a small low-power telescope would be used in its place. The bombardier would rotate the telescope left or right to follow the target. This motion would cause the gyros to precess, and this signal would drive the PDI automatically. The pilot would follow the PDI as before.

Norden initially delivered three prototypes of the stabilized bombsight without the automatic PDI. In testing, the Navy found that while the system did improve accuracy when it worked, it was complicated to use and often failed, leaving the real-world accuracy no better than before. They asked Norden for suggestions on ways to improve this. They were still interested in the PDI work, and the contract was allowed to continue.

=== Mark XI ===
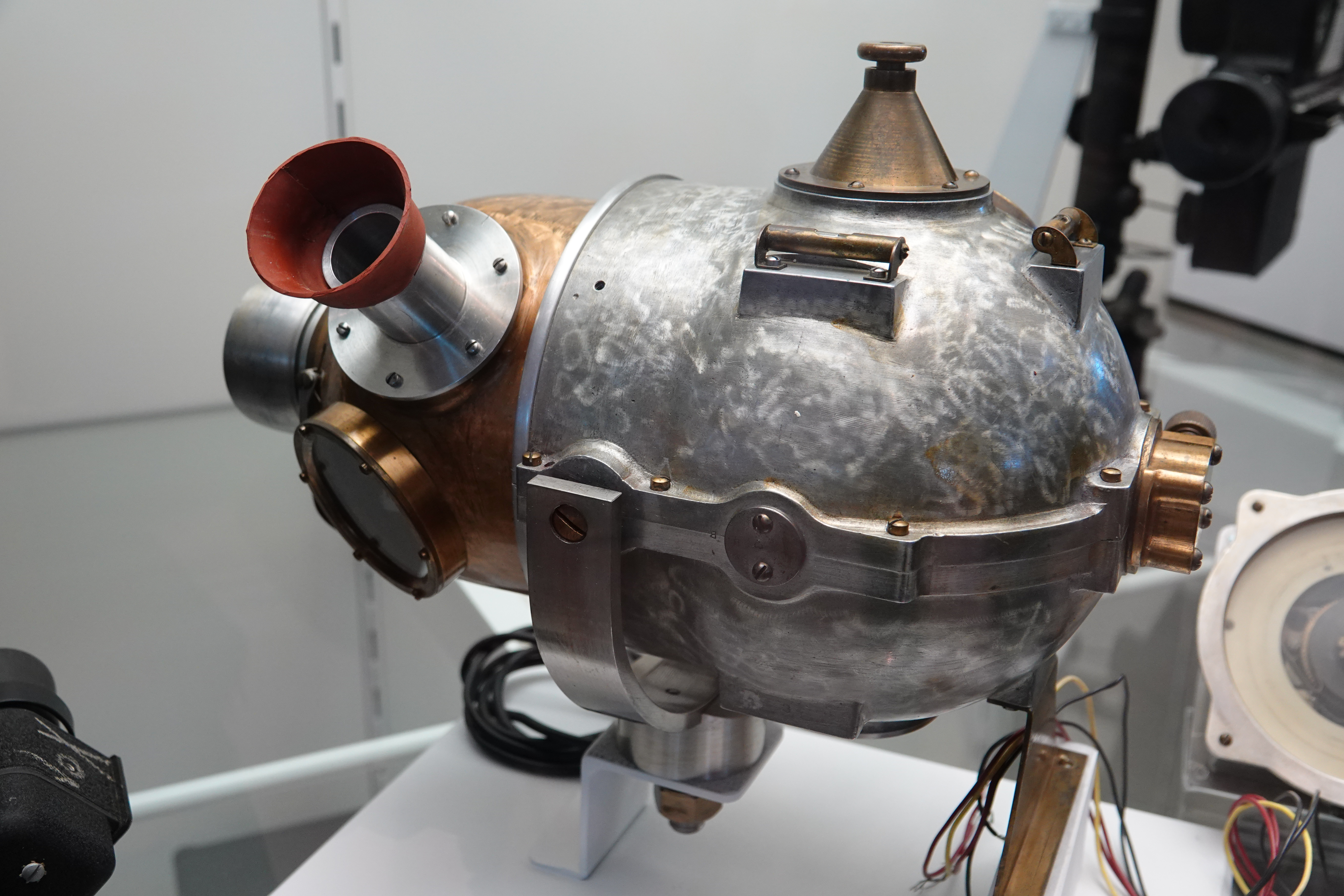
1923 prototype Mark XI on display at the Steven F. Udvar-Hazy Center. A pre-autopilot version, turning it around the bearing at the base indicated the desired direction changes to the pilot.

Norden suggested that the only solution to improve accuracy would be to directly measure the ground speed, as opposed to calculating it using the CSBS's wind triangle. To time the drop, Norden used an idea already in use on other bombsights, the "equal distance" concept. This was based on the observation that the time needed to travel a certain distance over the ground would remain relatively constant during the bomb run, as the wind would not be expected to change dramatically over a short period of time. If you could accurately mark out a distance on the ground, or in practice, an angle in the sky, timing the passage over that distance would give you all the information needed to time the drop.

Norden's version of the system was very similar to the Army's Estoppey D-4 of the same era, differing largely in the physical details of the actual sights. The D-4 used thin wires as the sights, while Norden's would use the small telescope of the Mark III-A. To use the system, the bombardier looked up the expected time it would take for the bombs to fall from the current altitude. This time was set into a countdown stopwatch, and the sights were set to the angle that the bombs would fall if there was no wind. The bombardier waited for the target to line up with a crosshair in the telescope. When it did, the timer was started, and the bombardier rotated the telescope around its vertical axis to track the target as they flew toward it. This movement was linked to a second crosshair through a gearing system. The bombardier continued moving the telescope until the timer ran out. The second crosshair was now at the correct aiming angle, or range angle, after accounting for any difference between groundspeed and airspeed. The bombardier then waited for the target to pass through the second crosshair to time the drop.

In 1924, the first prototype of this design, known to the Navy as the Mark XI, was delivered to the Navy's proving grounds in Virginia. In testing, the system proved disappointing. The circular error probable (CEP), a circle into which 50% of the bombs would fall, was 110 feet (34 m) wide from only 3,000 feet (910 m) altitude. This was an error of over 3.6%, somewhat worse than existing systems. Moreover, bombardiers universally complained that the device was far too hard to use. Norden worked tirelessly on the design, and by 1928, the accuracy had improved to 2% of altitude. This was enough for the Navy's Bureau of Ordnance to place a US$348,000 contract (equivalent to $6.53 million in 2025) for 80 production examples.

Norden was known for his confrontational and volatile nature. He often worked 16-hour days and thought little of anyone who did not. Navy officers began to refer to him as "Old Man Dynamite". During development, the Navy asked Norden to consider taking on a partner to handle the business and leave Norden free to develop the engineering side. They recommended former Army colonel Theodore Barth, an engineer who had been in charge of gas mask production during World War I. The match-up was excellent, as Barth had the qualities Norden lacked: charm, diplomacy, and a head for business. The two became close friends.

=== Initial US Army interest ===
In the December of 1927, the United States Department of War was granted permission to use a bridge over the Pee Dee River in North Carolina for target practice, as it would soon be sunk in the waters of a new dam. The 1st Provisional Bombardment Squadron, equipped with Keystone LB-5 bombers, attacked the bridge over a period of five days, flying 20 missions a day in perfect weather and attacking at altitudes from 6,000 to 8,000 feet (1,800–2,400 m). After this massive effort, the middle section of the bridge finally fell on the last day. However, the effort as a whole was clearly a failure in any practical sense.

About the same time as the operation was being carried out, General James Fechet replaced General Mason Patrick as commander of the USAAC. He received a report on the results of the test, and on 6 January 1928 sent out a lengthy memo to Brigadier General William Gillmore, chief of the Material Division at Wright Field, stating:

I cannot too strongly emphasize the importance of a bomb sight of precision, since the ability of bombardment aviation to perform its mission of destruction is almost entirely dependent upon an accurate and practical bomb sight.

He went on to request information on every bombsight then used at Wright, as well as "the Navy's newest design". However, the Mark XI was so secret that Gillmore was not aware Fechet was referring to the Norden. Gilmore produced contracts for twenty-five examples of an improved version of the Seversky C-1, the C-3, and six prototypes of a new design known as the Inglis L-1. The L-1 never matured, and Inglis later helped Seversky to design the improved C-4.

The wider Army establishment became aware of the Mark XI in 1929 and was eventually able to buy an example in 1931. Their testing mirrored the Navy's experience; they found that the gyro stabilization worked and the sight was accurate, but it was also "entirely too complicated" to use. The Army turned its attention to further upgraded versions of their existing prototypes, replacing the older vector bombsight mechanisms with the new synchronous method of measuring the proper dropping angle.

=== Fully automatic bombsight ===
While the Mk. XI was reaching its final design, the Navy learned of the Army's efforts to develop a synchronous bombsight, and asked Norden to design one for them. Norden was initially unconvinced this was workable, but the Navy persisted and offered him a development contract in June 1929. Norden retreated to his mother's house in Zürich and returned in 1930 with a working prototype. Lieutenant Frederick Entwistle, the Navy's chief of bombsight development, judged it revolutionary.

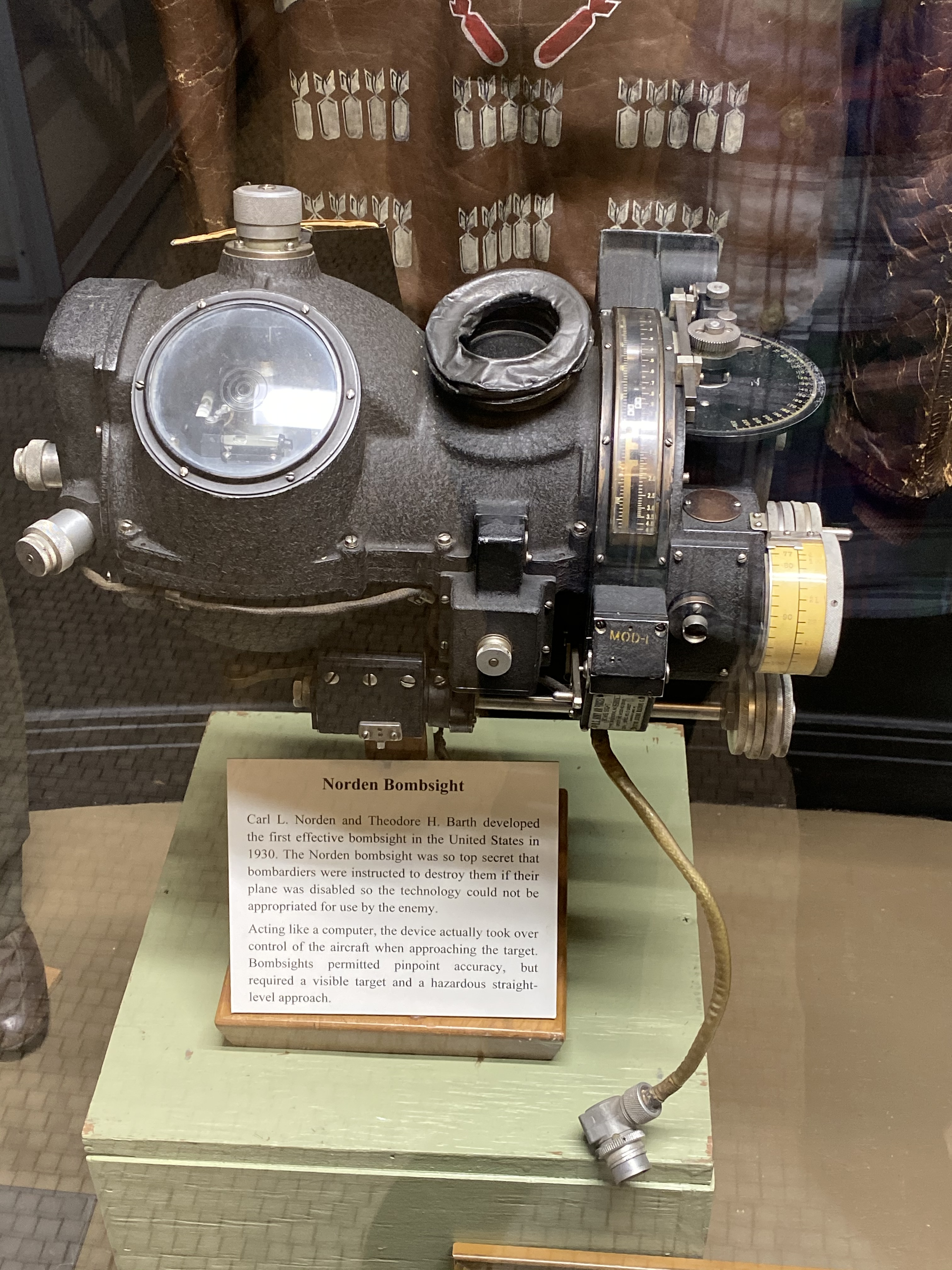
Norden bombsight display in the Soldiers and Sailors Memorial Hall and Museum in Pittsburgh, Pennsylvania

The new design, the Mark XV, was delivered in production quality in the summer of 1931. In testing, it proved to eliminate all of the problems of the earlier Mk. XI design. From 4,000 feet (1,200 m) altitude the prototype delivered a CEP of 35 feet (11 m), while even the latest production Mk. XI's were 55 feet (17 m). At higher altitudes, a series of 80 bomb runs demonstrated a CEP of 75 feet (23 m). In a test on 7 October 1931, the Mk. XV dropped 50% of its bombs on a static target, the USS Pittsburgh, while a similar aircraft with the Mk. XI had only 20% of its bombs hit.

Moreover, the new system was dramatically simpler to use. After locating the target in the sighting system, the bombardier simply made fine adjustments using two control wheels throughout the bomb run. There was no need for external calculation, lookup tables or pre-run measurements – everything was carried out automatically through an internal wheel-and-disc calculator. The calculator took a short time to settle on a solution, with setups as short as 6 seconds, compared to the 50 seconds needed for the Mk. XI to measure its ground speed. In most cases, the bomb run needed to be only 30 seconds long.

Despite this success, the design also demonstrated several serious problems. In particular, the gyroscopic platform had to be levelled out before use using several spirit levels, and then checked and repeatedly reset for accuracy. Worse, the gyros had a limited degree of movement, and if the plane banked far enough the gyro would reach its limit and have to be re-set from scratch – something that could happen even due to strong turbulence. If the gyros were found to be off, the levelling procedure took as long as 8 minutes. Other minor problems were the direct current electric motors which drove the gyroscopes, whose brushes wore down quickly and left carbon dust throughout the interior of the device, and the positioning of the control knobs, which meant the bombardier could only adjust side-to-side or up-and-down aim at a time, not both. But despite all of these problems, the Mark XV was so superior to any other design that the Navy ordered it into production.

The Carl L. Norden Company was incorporated in 1931, supplying the sights under a dedicated source contract. In effect, the company was owned by the Navy. In 1934 the newly-forming GHQ Air Force, the purchasing arm of the US Army Air Corps, selected the Norden for their bombers as well, referring to it as the M-1. However, due to the dedicated source contract, the Army had to buy the sights from the Navy. This was not only annoying for inter-service rivalry reasons, but the Air Corps' higher-speed bombers demanded several changes to the design, notably the ability to aim the sighting telescope further forward to give the bombardier more time to set up. The Navy was not interested in these changes, and would not promise to work them into the production lines. Worse, Norden's factories were having serious problems keeping up with demand for the Navy alone, and in January 1936, the Navy suspended all shipments to the Army.

=== Autopilot ===
Mk. XV's were initially installed with the same automatic PDI as the earlier Mk. XI. In practice, it was found that the pilots had a very difficult time keeping the aircraft stable enough to match the accuracy of the bombsight. Starting in 1932 and proceeding in fits and starts for the next six years, Norden developed the Stabilized Bombing Approach Equipment (SBAE), a mechanical autopilot that attached to the bombsight. However, it was not a true "autopilot", in that it could not fly the aircraft by itself. By rotating the bombsight in relationship to the SBAE, the SBAE could account for wind and turbulence and calculate the appropriate directional changes needed to bring the aircraft onto the bomb run far more precisely than a human pilot. The minor adaptations needed on the bombsight itself produced what the Army referred to as the M-4 model. During the bomb run the bombardier effectively flew the aircraft, the sight's autopilot linkage holding the course until release.

In 1937 the Army, faced with the continuing supply problems with the Norden, once again turned to Sperry Gyroscope to see if they could come up with a solution. Their earlier models had all proved unreliable, but they had continued working with the designs throughout this period and had addressed many of the problems. By 1937, Orland Esval had introduced a new AC-powered electrical gyroscope that spun at 30,000 rpm, compared to the Norden's 7,200 rpm, which dramatically improved the performance of the inertial platform. The use of three-phase AC power and inductive pickup eliminated the carbon brushes, and further simplified the design. Carl Frische had developed a new system to automatically level the platform, eliminating the time-consuming process needed on the Norden. The two collaborated on a new design, adding a second gyro to handle heading changes, and named the result the Sperry S-1. Existing supplies of Nordens continued to be supplied to the USAAC's B-17s, while the S-1 equipped the B-24Es being sent to the 15th Air Force.

Some B-17s had been equipped with a simple heading-only autopilot, the Sperry A-3. The company had also been working on an all-electronic model, the A-5, which stabilized in all three directions. By the early 1930s, it was being used in a variety of Navy aircraft to excellent reviews. By connecting the outputs of the S-1 bombsight to the A-5 autopilot, Sperry produced a system similar to the M-4/SBAE, but it reacted far more quickly. The combination of the S-1 and A-5 so impressed the Army that on 17 June 1941 they authorized the construction of a 2-million-square-foot (186,000 m^{2}) factory and noted that "in the future all production models of bombardment airplanes be equipped with the A-5 Automatic Pilot and have provisions permitting the installation of either the M-Series [Norden] Bombsight or the S-1 Bombsight".

=== British interest, Tizard mission ===
By 1938, information about the Norden had worked its way up the Royal Air Force chain of command and was well known within that organization. The British had been developing a tachometric bombsight of their own known as the Automatic Bomb Sight, but combat experience in 1939 demonstrated the need for it to be stabilized. Work was underway as the Stabilized Automatic Bomb Sight (SABS), but it would not be available until 1940 at the earliest, and likely later. Even then, it did not feature the autopilot linkage of the Norden, and would thus find it difficult to match the Norden's performance in anything but smooth air. Acquiring the Norden became a major goal.

The RAF's first attempt, in the spring of 1938, was rebuffed by the US Navy. Air Chief Marshal Edgar Ludlow-Hewitt, commanding RAF Bomber Command, demanded Air Ministry action. They wrote to George Pirie, the British air attaché in Washington, suggesting he approach the US Army with an offer of an information exchange with their own SABS. Pirie replied that he had already looked into this, and was told that the US Army had no licensing rights to the device as it was owned by the US Navy. The matter was not helped by a minor diplomatic issue that flared up in July when a French air observer was found to be on board a crashed Douglas Aircraft Company bomber, forcing President Roosevelt to promise no further information exchanges with foreign powers.

Six months later, after a change of leadership within the US Navy's Bureau of Aeronautics, on 8 March 1939, Pirie was once again instructed to ask the US Navy about the Norden, this time enhancing the deal with offers of British power-operated turrets. However, Pirie expressed concern as he noted the Norden had become as much political as technical, and its relative merits were being publicly debated in Congress weekly while the US Navy continued to say the Norden was "the United States' most closely guarded secret".

The RAF's desires were only further goaded on 13 April 1939, when Pirie was invited to watch an air demonstration at Fort Benning where the painted outline of a battleship was the target:

At 1:27 while everyone was still searching [the sky for the B-17s] six 300-pound (140 kg) bombs suddenly burst at split second intervals on the deck of the battleship, and it was at least 30 seconds later before someone spotted the B-17 at 12,000 feet (3,700 m)

The three following B-17s also hit the target, and then a flight of a dozen Douglas B-18 Bolos placed most of their bombs in a separate 600-by-600-yard (550 m × 550 m) square outlined on the ground.

Another change of management within the Bureau of Aeronautics had the effect of making the US Navy more friendly to British overtures, but no one was willing to fight the political battle needed to release the design. The Navy brass was concerned that giving the Norden to the RAF would increase its chances of falling into German hands, which could put the US's own fleet at risk. The UK Air Ministry continued increasing pressure on Pirie, who eventually stated there was simply no way for him to succeed, and suggested the only way forward would be through the highest diplomatic channels in the Foreign Office. Initial probes in this direction were also rebuffed. When a report stated that the Norden's results were three to four times as good as their own bombsights, the Air Ministry decided to sweeten the pot and suggested they offer information on radar in exchange. This too was rebuffed.

The matter eventually worked its way to the Prime Minister, Neville Chamberlain, who wrote personally to President Roosevelt asking for the Norden, but even this was rejected. The reason for these rejections was more political than technical, but the US Navy's demands for secrecy were certainly important. They repeated that the design would be released only if the British could demonstrate the basic concept was common knowledge, and therefore not a concern if it fell into German hands. The British failed to convince them, even after offering to equip their examples with a variety of self-destruct devices.

This may have been ameliorated by the winter of 1939, at which point a number of articles about the Norden appeared in the US popular press with reasonably accurate descriptions of its basic workings. But when these were traced back to the press corps at the US Army Air Corps, the US Navy was apoplectic. Instead of accepting it was now in the public domain, any discussion about the Norden was immediately shut down. This drove both the British Air Ministry and Royal Navy to increasingly anti-American attitudes when they considered sharing their own developments, notably newer ASDIC systems. By 1940 the situation on scientific exchange was entirely deadlocked as a result.

Looking for ways around the deadlock, Henry Tizard sent Archibald Vivian Hill to the US to take a survey of US technical capability in order to better assess what technologies the US would be willing to exchange. This effort was the start on the path that led to the famous Tizard Mission in late August 1940. Ironically, by the time the Mission was being planned, the Norden had been removed from the list of items to be discussed, and Roosevelt personally noted this was due largely to political reasons. Ultimately, although Tizard was unable to convince the US to release the design, he was able to request information about its external dimensions and details on the mounting system so it could be easily added to British bombers if it were released in the future.

=== Production, problems, and Army standardization ===
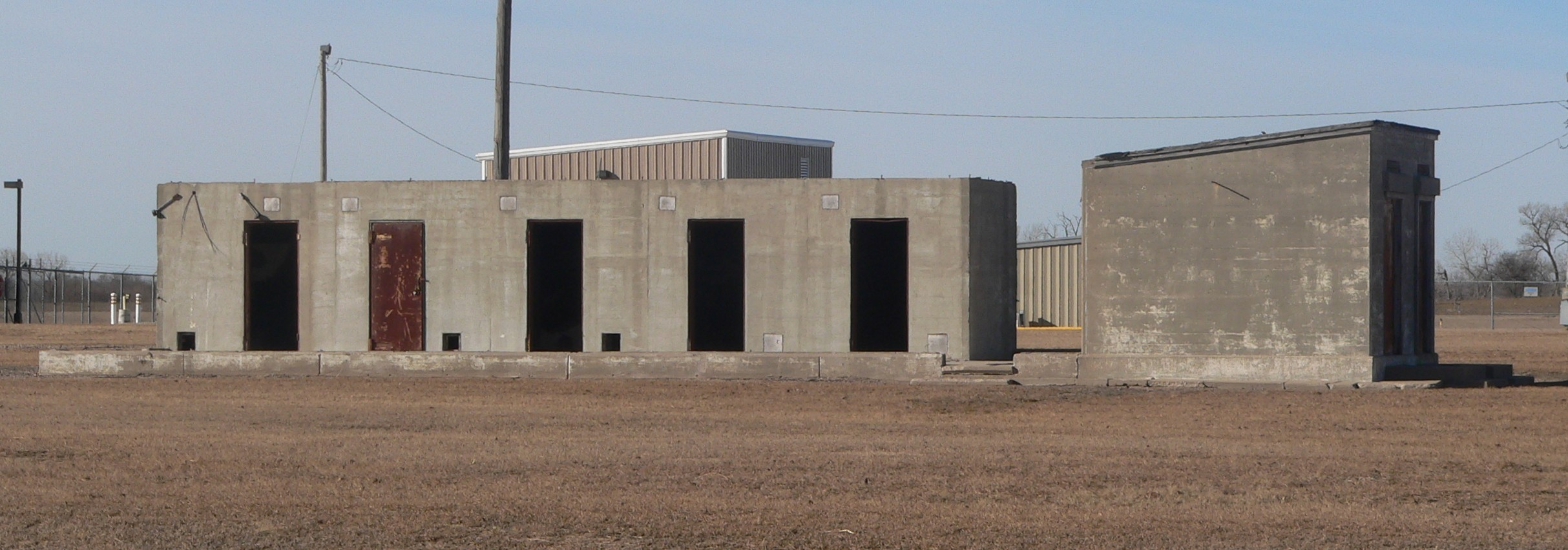
Cement vaults for Norden bombsight storage at the former Great Bend Army Air Field, Kansas, now listed on the National Register for Historic Places.

The conversion of Norden Laboratories Corporation's New York City engineering lab to a production factory was a long process. Before the war, skilled craftsmen, most of them German or Italian immigrants, hand-made almost every part of the 2,000-part machine. Between 1932 and 1938, the company produced only 121 bombsights per year. During the first year after the Attack on Pearl Harbor, Norden produced 6,900 bombsights, three-quarters of which went to the US Navy.

When Norden heard of the US Army's dealings with Sperry, Theodore Barth called a meeting with the US Army and US Navy at their factory in New York City. Barth offered to build an entirely new factory just to supply the US Army, but the US Navy refused this. Instead, the US Army suggested that Norden adapt their sight to work with Sperry's A-5, which Barth refused. Norden actively attempted to make the bombsight incompatible with the A-5.

It was not until 1942 that the impasse was finally solved by farming out autopilot production to Honeywell Regulator, who combined features of the Norden-mounted SBAE with the aircraft-mounted A-5 to produce what the US Army referred to as "Automatic Flight Control Equipment" (AFCE); the unit would later be redesigned as the C-1. The Norden, now connected with the aircraft's built-in autopilot, allowed the bombardier alone to fully control minor movements of the aircraft during the bombing run.

By May 1943 the US Navy was complaining that they had a surplus of devices, with full production turned over to the USAAF. After investing more than $100 million (equivalent to $2 billion in 2025) in Sperry bombsight manufacturing plants, the USAAF concluded that the Norden M-series was far superior in accuracy, dependability, and design. Sperry contracts were cancelled in November 1943. When production ended a few months later, 5,563 Sperry bombsight-autopilot combinations had been built, most of which were installed in Consolidated B-24 Liberator bombers.

Expansion of Norden bombsight production to a final total of six factories took several years. The USAAF demanded additional production to meet their needs, and eventually arranged for the Victor Adding Machine company to gain a manufacturing license, and then Remington Rand. Ironically, during this period the US Navy abandoned the Norden in favor of dive bombing, reducing the demand. By the end of the war, Norden and its subcontractors had produced 72,000 M-9 bombsights for the US Army Air Force alone, costing $8,800 each (equivalent to $157,000 in 2025).

== Description and operation ==
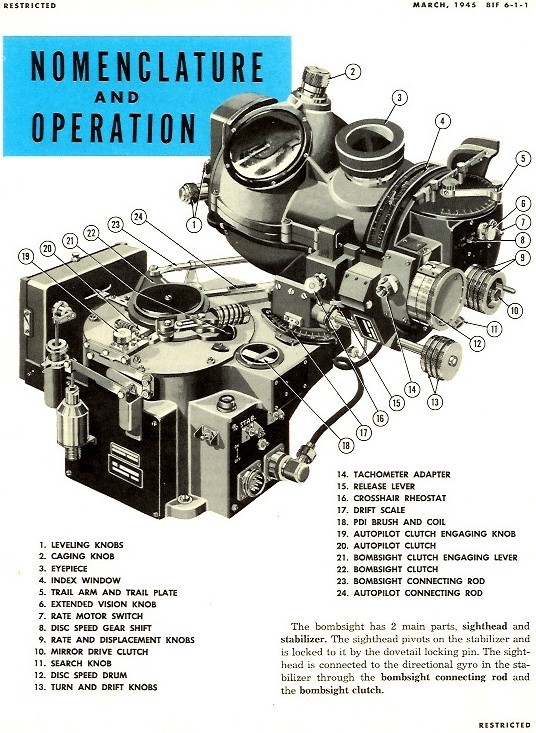
A page from the Bombardier's Information File (BIF) that describes the components and controls of the Norden Bombsight. The separation of the stabilizer and sight head is evident.

=== Background ===
Typical bombsights of the pre-war era worked on the "vector bombsight" principle introduced with the World War I Course Setting Bomb Sight. These systems consisted of a slide rule-type calculator that was used to calculate the effects of the wind on the bomber based on simple vector arithmetic. The mathematical principles are identical to those on the E6-B flight computer used to this day.

In operation, the bombardier would first take a measurement of the wind speed using one of a variety of methods, and then dial that speed and direction into the bombsight. This would move the sights to indicate the direction the plane should fly to take it directly over the target with any cross-wind taken into account, and also set the angle of the iron sights to account for the wind's effect on ground speed.

These systems had two primary problems in terms of accuracy. The first was that there were several steps that had to be carried out in sequence in order to set up the bombsight correctly, and there was limited time to do all of this during the bomb run. As a result, the accuracy of the wind measurement was always limited, and errors in setting the equipment or making the calculations were common. The second problem was that the sight was attached to the aircraft, and thus moved about during maneuvers, during which time the bombsight would not point at the target. As the aircraft had to maneuver in order to make the proper approach, this limited the time allowed to accurately make corrections. This combination of issues demanded a long bomb run.

Experiments had shown that adding a stabilizer system to a vector bombsight would roughly double the accuracy of the system. This would allow the bombsight to remain level while the aircraft maneuvered, giving the bombardier more time to make his adjustments, as well as reducing or eliminating mis-measurements when sighting off of non-level sights. However, this would not have any effect on the accuracy of the wind measurements, nor the calculation of the vectors. The Norden attacked all of these problems.

=== Basic operation ===
"The Norden Bombsight" (1943) de-classified official USAAF training film reel.

To improve the calculation time, the Norden used a mechanical computer inside the bombsight to calculate the range angle of the bombs. By simply dialing in the aircraft's altitude and heading, along with estimates of the wind speed and direction (in relation to the aircraft), the computer would automatically, and quickly, calculate the aim point. This not only reduced the time needed for the bombsight setup but also dramatically reduced the chance for errors. This attack on the accuracy problem was by no means unique; several other bombsights of the era used similar calculators. It was the way the Norden used these calculations that differed.

Conventional bombsights are set up pointing at a fixed angle, the range angle, which accounts for the various effects on the trajectory of the bomb. To the operator looking through the sights, the crosshairs indicate the location on the ground the bombs would impact if released at that instant. As the aircraft moves forward, the target approaches the crosshairs from the front, moving rearward, and the bombardier releases the bombs as the target passes through the line of the sights. One example of a highly automated system of this type was the RAF's Mark XIV bomb sight.

The Norden worked in an entirely different fashion, based on the "synchronous" or "tachometric" method. Internally, the calculator continually computed the impact point, as was the case for previous systems. However, the resulting range angle was not displayed directly to the bombardier or dialed into the sights. Instead, the bombardier used the sighting telescope to locate the target long in advance of the drop point. A separate section of the calculator used the inputs for altitude and airspeed to determine the angular velocity of the target, the speed at which it would be seen drifting backward due to the forward motion of the aircraft. The output of this calculator drove a rotating prism at that angular speed in order to keep the target centered in the telescope. In a properly adjusted Norden, the target remains motionless in the sights.

The Norden thus calculated two angles: the range angle based on the altitude, airspeed and ballistics; and the current angle to the target, based on the ground speed and heading of the aircraft. The difference between these two angles represented the "correction" that needed to be applied to bring the aircraft over the proper drop point. If the aircraft was properly aligned with the target on the bomb run, the difference between the range and target angles would be continually reduced, eventually to zero (within the accuracy of the mechanisms). At this moment the Norden automatically dropped the bombs.

In practice, the target failed to stay centered in the sighting telescope when it was first set up. Instead, due to inaccuracies in the estimated wind speed and direction, the target would drift in the sight. To correct for this, the bombardier would use fine-tuning controls to slowly cancel out any motion through trial and error. These adjustments had the effect of updating the measured ground speed used to calculate the motion of the prisms, slowing the visible drift. Over a short period of time of continual adjustments, the drift would stop, and the bombsight would now hold an extremely accurate measurement of the exact ground speed and heading. Better yet, these measurements were being carried out on the bomb run, not before it, and helped eliminate inaccuracies due to changes in the conditions as the aircraft moved. And by eliminating the manual calculations, the bombardier was left with much more time to adjust his measurements, and thus settle at a much more accurate result.

The angular speed of the prism changes with the range of the target: consider the reverse situation, the apparent high angular speed of an aircraft passing overhead compared to its apparent speed when it is seen at a longer distance. In order to properly account for this non-linear effect, the Norden used a system of slip-disks similar to those used in differential analysers. However, this slow change at long distances made it difficult to fine-tune the drift early in the bomb run. In practice, bombardiers would often set up their ground speed measurements in advance of approaching the target area by selecting a convenient "target" on the ground that was closer to the bomber and thus had more obvious motion in the sight. These values would then be used as the initial setting when the target was later sighted.

=== System description ===
Principles of Operation of the Norden Bombsight (1943) de-classified official USAAF training film reel.

The Norden bombsight consisted of two primary parts, the gyroscopic stabilization platform on the left side, and the mechanical calculator and sighting head on the right side. They were essentially separate instruments, connecting through the sighting prism. The sighting eyepiece was located in the middle, between the two, in a less than convenient location that required some dexterity to use.

Before use, the Norden's stabilization platform had to be righted, as it slowly drifted over time and no longer kept the sight pointed vertically. Righting was accomplished through a time-consuming process of comparing the platform's attitude to small spirit levels seen through a glass window on the front of the stabilizer. In practice, this could take as long as eight and a half minutes. This problem was made worse by the fact that the platform's range of motion was limited, and could be tumbled even by strong turbulence, requiring it to be reset again. This problem seriously upset the usefulness of the Norden, and led the RAF to reject it once they received examples in 1942. Some versions included a system that quickly righted the platform, but this "Automatic Gyro Leveling Device" proved to be a maintenance problem, and was removed from later examples.

Once the stabilizer was righted, the bombardier would then dial in the initial setup for altitude, speed, and direction. The prism would then be "clutched out" of the computer, allowing it to be moved rapidly to search for the target on the ground. Later Nordens were equipped with a reflector sight to aid in this step. Once the target was located the computer was clutched in and started moving the prism to follow the target. The bombardier would begin making adjustments to the aim. As all of the controls were located on the right, and had to be operated while sighting through the telescope, another problem with the Norden is that the bombardier could only adjust either the vertical or horizontal aim at a given time, his other arm was normally busy holding himself up above the telescope.

On top of the device, to the right of the sight, were two final controls. The first was the setting for "trail", which was pre-set at the start of the mission for the type of bombs being used. The second was the "index window" which displayed the aim point in numerical form. The bombsight calculated the current aim point internally and displayed this as a sliding pointer on the index. The current sighting point, where the prism was aimed, was also displayed against the same scale. In operation, the sight would be set far in advance of the aim point, and as the bomber approached the target the sighting point indicator would slowly slide toward the aim point. When the two met, the bombs were automatically released. The aircraft was moving over 350 feet per second (110 m/s), so even minor interruptions in timing could dramatically affect aim.

Early examples, and most used by the Navy, had an output that directly drove a Pilot Direction Indicator meter in the cockpit. This eliminated the need to manually signal the pilot, as well as eliminating the possibility of error.

In US Army Air Forces use, the Norden bombsight was attached to its autopilot base, which was in turn connected with the aircraft's autopilot. The Honeywell C-1 autopilot could be used as an autopilot by the flight crew during the journey to the target area through a control panel in the cockpit, but was more commonly used under direct command of the bombardier. The Norden's box-like autopilot unit sat behind and below the sight and attached to it at a single rotating pivot. After control of the aircraft was passed to the bombardier during the bomb run, he would first rotate the entire Norden so the vertical line in the sight passed through the target. From that point on, the autopilot would attempt to guide the bomber so it followed the course of the bombsight, and pointed the heading to zero out the drift rate, fed to it through a coupling. As the aircraft turned onto the correct angle, a belt and pulley system rotated the sight back to match the changing heading. The autopilot was another reason for the Norden's accuracy, as it ensured the aircraft quickly followed the correct course and kept it on that course much more accurately than the pilots could.

Later in the war, the Norden was combined with other systems to widen the conditions for successful bombing. Notable among these was the radar system called the H2X (Mickey), which were used directly with the Norden bombsight. The radar proved most accurate in coastal regions, as the water surface and the coastline produced a distinctive radar echo.

== Combat use ==
=== Early tests ===
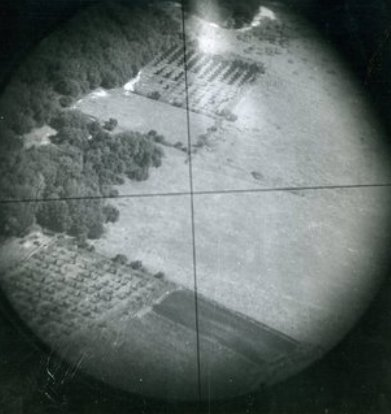
Norden bombsight crosshairs, 1944 English countryside

The Norden bombsight was developed during a period of United States non-interventionism when the dominant US military strategy was the defense of the US and its possessions. A considerable amount of this strategy was based on stopping attempted invasions by sea, both with direct naval power, and starting in the 1930s, with USAAC airpower. Most air forces of the era invested heavily in dive bombers or torpedo bombers for these roles, but these aircraft generally had limited range; long-range strategic reach would require the use of an aircraft carrier. The Army felt the combination of the Norden and B-17 Flying Fortress presented an alternate solution, believing that small formations of B-17s could successfully attack shipping at long distances from the USAAC's widespread bases. The high altitudes the Norden allowed would help increase the range of the aircraft, especially if equipped with a turbocharger, as with each of the four Wright Cyclone 9 radial engines of the B-17.

In 1940, Barth claimed that "we do not regard a 15 foot (4.6 m) square... as being a very difficult target to hit from an altitude of 30,000 feet (9,100 m)". At some point the company started using the pickle barrel imagery, to reinforce the bombsight's reputation. After the device became known about publicly in 1942, the Norden company in 1943 rented Madison Square Garden and folded their own show in between the presentations of the Ringling Bros. and Barnum & Bailey Circus. Their show involved dropping a wooden "bomb" into a pickle barrel, at which point a pickle popped out.

These claims were greatly exaggerated; in 1940 the average score for an Air Corps bombardier was a circular error of 400 feet (120 m) from 15,000 feet (4,600 m), not 15 feet (4.6 m) from 30,000 feet (9,100 m). Real-world performance was poor enough that the Navy de-emphasized level attacks in favor of dive bombing almost immediately. The Grumman TBF Avenger could mount the Norden, like the preceding Douglas TBD Devastator, but combat use was disappointing and eventually described as "hopeless" during the Guadalcanal campaign. In spite of giving up on the device in 1942, bureaucratic inertia meant they were supplied as standard equipment until 1944.

USAAF anti-shipping operations in the Far East were generally unsuccessful. In early operations during the Battle of the Philippines, B-17s claimed to have sunk one minesweeper and damaged two Japanese transports, the cruiser Naka, and the destroyer Murasame. However, all of these ships are known to have suffered no damage from air attack during that period. In other early battles, including the Battle of Coral Sea or Battle of Midway, no claims were made at all, although some hits were seen on docked targets. The USAAF eventually replaced all of their anti-shipping B-17s with other aircraft, and came to use the skip bombing technique in direct low-level attacks.

=== Air war in Europe ===
As US participation in the war started, the US Army Air Forces drew up widespread and comprehensive bombing plans based on the Norden. They believed the B-17 had a 1.2% probability of hitting a 100-foot (30 m) target from 20,000 feet (6,100 m), meaning that 220 bombers would be needed for a 93% probability of one or more hits. This was not considered a problem, and the USAAF forecast the need for 251 combat groups to provide enough bombers to fulfill their comprehensive pre-war plans.

After earlier combat trials proved troublesome, the Norden bombsight and its associated AFCE were used on a wide scale for the first time on the 18 March 1943 mission to Bremen-Vegesack, Germany. The 303d Bombardment Group dropped 76% of its load within a 1,000-foot (300 m) ring, representing a CEP well under 1,000 feet (300 m). As at sea, many early missions over Europe demonstrated varied results; on wider inspection, only 50% of American bombs fell within 1/4 mile (400 m) of the target, and American flyers estimated that as many as 90% of bombs could miss their targets. The average CEP in 1943 was 1,200 feet (370 m), meaning that only 16% of the bombs fell within 1,000 feet (300 m) of the aiming point. A 500-pound (230 kg) bomb, standard for precision missions after 1943, had a lethal radius of only 60 to 90 feet (18 to 27 m).

Faced with these poor results, Curtis LeMay started a series of reforms in an effort to address the problems. In particular, he introduced the "combat box" formation in order to provide maximum defensive firepower by densely packing the bombers. As part of this change, he identified the best bombardiers in his command and assigned them to the lead bomber of each box. Instead of every bomber in the box using their Norden individually, the lead bombardiers were the only ones actively using the Norden, and the rest of the box's aircraft dropped their bombs when they saw the lead's bombs leaving his aircraft. Although this spread the bombs over the area of the combat box, this could still improve accuracy over individual efforts. It also helped stop a problem where various aircraft, all slaved to their autopilots on the same target, would drift into each other. These changes did improve accuracy, which suggests that much of the problem is attributable to the bombardier. However, true "precision" attacks still proved difficult or impossible.

When Jimmy Doolittle took over command of the 8th Air Force from Ira Eaker in early 1944, precision bombing attempts were dropped. Area bombing, like the RAF efforts, were widely used with 750 and then 1,000-bomber raids against large targets. The main targets were railroad marshaling yards (27.4% of the bomb tonnage dropped), airfields (11.6%), oil refineries (9.5%), and military installations (8.8%). To some degree, the targets themselves were secondary; Doolittle used the bombers as an irresistible target to draw up Luftwaffe fighters into the ever-increasing swarms of Allied long-range escort fighters. As these missions broke the Luftwaffe, missions were able to be carried out at lower altitudes or especially in bad weather when the H2X radar could be used. The accuracy of H2X bombing, in the middle part of 1944, was found to be much higher than that obtained using the Norden sight. In spite of abandoning precision attacks, accuracy nevertheless improved. By 1945, the 8th was putting up to 60% of its bombs within 1,000 feet (300 m), a CEP of about 900 feet (270 m).

Still pursuing precision attacks, various remotely guided weapons were developed, notably the AZON and VB-3 Razon bombs and similar weapons.

=== Adaptations ===
The Norden operated by mechanically turning the viewpoint so the target remained stationary in the display. The mechanism was designed for the low angular rate encountered at high altitudes, and thus had a relatively low range of operational speeds. The Norden could not rotate the sight fast enough for bombing at low altitude, for instance. Typically this was solved by removing the Norden completely and replacing it with simpler sighting systems.

A good example of its replacement was the refitting of the Doolittle Raiders with a simple iron sight. Designed by Capt. C. Ross Greening, the sight was mounted to the existing pilot direction indicator, allowing the bombardier to make corrections remotely, like the bombsights of an earlier era.

However, the Norden combined two functions, aiming and stabilization. While the former was not useful at low altitudes, the latter could be even more useful, especially if flying in rough air near the surface. This led James "Buck" Dozier to mount a Doolittle-like sight on top of the stabilizer in the place of the sighting head in order to attack German submarines in the Caribbean Sea. This proved extraordinarily useful and was soon used throughout the fleet.

=== Postwar use ===
In the postwar era, the United States mostly stopped developing new precision bombsights. Initially this was because of the war's end but, as budgets increased during the Cold War, the deployment of nuclear weapons meant accuracies of around 3,000 yards (2,700 m) were sufficient, well within the capabilities of existing radar bombing systems. Only one major bombsight of note was developed, the Y-4 developed on the Boeing B-47 Stratojet. This sight combined the images of the radar and a lens system in front of the aircraft, allowing them to be directly compared at once through a binocular eyepiece.

Bombsights on older aircraft, like the Boeing B-29 Superfortress and the later B-50, were left in their wartime state. When the Korean War began, these aircraft were pressed into service and the Norden once again became the USAF's primary bombsight. This occurred again when the Vietnam War started; in this case retired World War II technicians had to be called up in order to make the bombsights operational again. Its last use in combat was by the Naval Air Observation Squadron Sixty-Seven (VO-67), during the Vietnam War. The bombsights were used in Operation Igloo White for implanting Air-Delivered Seismic Intrusion Detectors (ADSID) along the Ho Chi Minh Trail.

== Wartime security ==
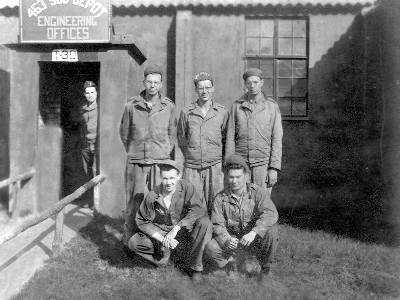
AFCE and Bombsight shop ground crew in the 463rd Sub Depot affiliated with the USAAF 389th Bomb Group based at Hethel, Norfolk, England

Since the Norden was considered a critical wartime instrument, bombardiers were required to take an oath during their training stating that they would defend its secret with their own life if necessary. In case the plane should make an emergency landing on enemy territory, the bombardier would have to shoot the important parts of the Norden with a gun to disable it. The Douglas TBD Devastator torpedo bomber was originally equipped with flotation bags in the wings to aid the aircrew's escape after ditching, but they were removed once the Pacific War began; this ensured that the aircraft would sink, taking the Norden with it.

Following each operational mission, bomber crews removed the aircraft's bombsight equipment and transferred it securely to the 'Bomb Vault.' This facility, designated as the AFCE (Automatic Flight Control Equipment) and Bombsight Shop, was typically housed within a base Quonset or Nissen hut and staffed by enlisted personnel from the attached USAAF Supply Depot Service Group. In addition to securing the sensitive Norden sights, these technicians performed vital maintenance on the associated control systems. Given the extreme secrecy and technical precision required, the non-commissioned officers and staff assigned to the shop held what was arguably the most skilled and classified ground-echelon role within the Sub-Depot.

As the end of World War II neared, the bombsight was gradually downgraded in its secrecy; however, it was not until 1944 that the first public display of the instrument occurred.

=== Espionage ===
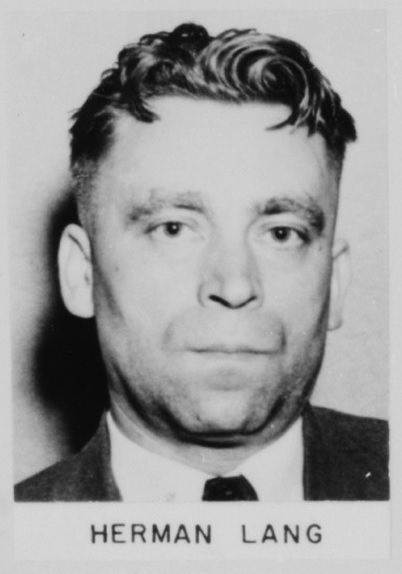
Herman W. Lang (FBI file photo)

Despite the security precautions, the entire Norden system had been passed to the Germans before the war started. Herman W. Lang, a German spy, had been employed by the Carl L. Norden Company. During a visit to Germany in 1938, Lang conferred with German military authorities and reconstructed plans of the confidential materials from memory. In 1941, Lang, along with the 32 other German agents of the Duquesne Spy Ring, was arrested by the FBI and convicted in the largest espionage prosecution in US history. He received a sentence of 18 years in prison on espionage charges and a 2-year concurrent sentence under the Foreign Agents Registration Act.

German instruments were fairly similar to the Norden, even before World War II. A similar set of gyroscopes provided a stabilized platform for the bombardier to sight through, although the complex interaction between the bombsight and autopilot was not used. The Carl Zeiss Lotfernrohr 7, or Lotfe 7, was an advanced mechanical system similar to the Norden bombsight, although in form it was more similar to the Sperry S-1. It started replacing the simpler Lotfernrohr 3 and BZG 2 in 1942, and emerged as the primary late-war bombsight used in most Luftwaffe level bombers. The use of the autopilot allowed single-handed operation, and was key to bombing use of the single-crewed Arado Ar 234.

Japanese forces captured examples of the Norden, primarily from North American B-25 Mitchell bombers. They developed a simplified and more compact version known as the Type 4 Automatic Bombing Sight, but found it too complex to mass produce. Further development led to the Type 1 Model 2 Automatic Bombing Sight which began limited production just before the end of the war. Approximately 20 were in service at the end of the war.

=== Postwar analysis ===
Postwar analysis placed the overall accuracy of daylight precision attacks with the Norden at about the same level as radar bombing efforts. The 8th Air Force put 31.8% of its bombs within 1,000 feet (300 m) from an average altitude of 21,000 feet (6,400 m), the 15th Air Force averaged 30.78% from 20,500 feet (6,200 m), and the 20th Air Force against Japan averaged 31% from 16,500 feet (5,000 m).

Many factors have been put forth to explain the Norden's poor real-world performance. Over Europe, the cloud cover was a common explanation, although performance did not improve even in favorable conditions. Over Japan, bomber crews soon discovered strong winds at high altitudes, the so-called jet streams, but the Norden bombsight worked only for wind speeds with minimal wind shear. Additionally, the bombing altitude over Japan reached up to 30,000 feet (9,100 m), but most of the testing had been done well below 20,000 feet (6,100 m). This extra altitude compounded factors that could previously be ignored; the shape of and even the paint on the bomb changed its aerodynamic properties and, at that time, nobody knew how to calculate the trajectory of bombs that reached supersonic speeds during their fall.

The RAF developed their own designs. Having moved to night bombing, where visual accuracy was difficult under even the best conditions, they introduced the much simpler Mark XIV bomb sight. This was designed not for accuracy above all, but ease of use in operational conditions. In testing in 1944, it was found to offer a CEP of 890 feet (270 m), about what the Norden was offering at that time. This led to a debate within the RAF whether to use their own tachometric design, the Stabilized Automatic Bomb Sight, or use the Mk. XIV on future bombers. The Mk. XIV ultimately served into the 1960s while the SABS faded from service as the Lancaster and Lincoln bombers fitted with it were retired by the late 1940s.

== See also ==
- Mary Babnik Brown, who donated her hair in 1944, often said to be for the bombsight crosshairs, though this is incorrect
- Glasgow Army Airfield Norden Bombsight Storage Vault
- Lotfernrohr 7, a similar German design of late-war vintage
- Stabilized Automatic Bomb Sight, a British bomb sight
- Mark XIV bomb sight, a British bomb sight

== Bibliography ==
- Correll, John (October 2008). "Daylight Precision Bombing" (PDF). Air Force Magazine: 60–64.
- Hallion, Richard (1993). "The USAAF Role". In Wood, Derek (ed.). Reaping the Whirlwind, Bracknell Paper No. 4. A Symposium on the Strategic Bomber Offensive 1939-45 (PDF). the Royal Air Force Historical Society. ISBN 0-9519824-2-7.
- Libbey, James (2013). Alexander P. de Seversky and the Quest for Air Power. Potomac Books. doi:10.2307/j.ctt1ddr8nb. ISBN 978-1612341798. JSTOR j.ctt1ddr8nb.
- Sherman, Don (February–March 1995). "The Secret Weapon". Air & Space Magazine.
- Moy, Timothy (2001). War Machines: transforming technologies in the U.S. military, 1920–1940. Texas A&M University Press. ISBN 978-1585441044.
- Searle, Loyd (September 1989). "The Bombsight War: Norden vs. Sperry" (PDF). IEEE Spectrum. 26 (9): 60–64. Bibcode:1989IEEES..26i..60S. doi:10.1109/6.90187. S2CID 22392603.
- Zimmerman, David (1996). Top Secret Exchange: the Tizard Mission and the Scientific War. McGill-Queen's Press. ISBN 978-0773514010.
