= Glasgow Army Airfield Norden Bombsight Storage Vault =

- Glasgow Army Airfield Norden Bombsight Vault
- U.S. National Register of Historic Places
- Location within Montana Location within the United States
- Location: 1/2 mile north of Glasgow, Montana
- Coordinates: 48.220161°N 106.609028°W
- Area: .5 acres (0.20 ha)
- NRHP reference No.: 11000824
- Added to NRHP: November 18, 2011

The Glasgow Army Airfield Norden Bombsight Vault is a shed which was used to store and protect Norden bombsights at the Glasgow Army Air Field during World War II. It was listed on the National Register of Historic Places in 2011.

It is a one-story 16.5 by 13 feet (5.0 m × 4.0 m) concrete shed with an 11 by 6 feet (3.4 m × 1.8 m) projection that has 8 inches (0.20 m)-thick walls and a poured concrete floor. It had steel vault doors which have since been removed.
