= Mary Babnik Brown =

Dancer; donated her hair (1907–1991)

- Born: November 22, 1907; Pueblo, Colorado, US
- Died: April 14, 1991 (aged 83); Pueblo, Colorado, US
- Occupations: Laborer, labor leader
- Parent(s): Frank Wolf Babnik and Mary Babnik

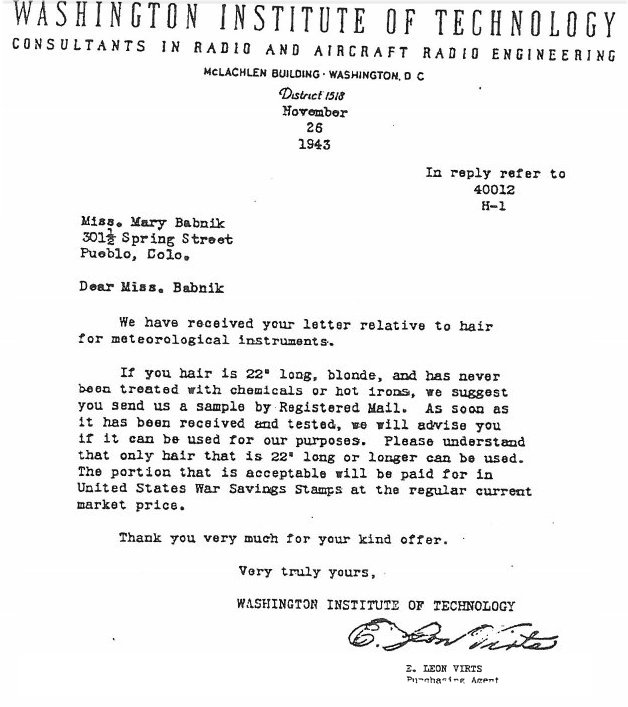
Washington Institute of Technology letter 26 Nov 1943 inviting Brown to submit her hair for the government war effort

Mary Babnik Brown (November 22, 1907 – April 14, 1991) was an American woman who became known for donating her hair to the United States military during World War II. Thirty-four inches (86 cm) long, her blonde hair had never been chemically treated or heated with curling irons.

Brown declined compensation for her donation, believing what she had done was her patriotic duty. President Ronald Reagan wrote to her on her 80th birthday in 1987 to thank her, and in 1990, she received a special achievement award from the Colorado Aviation Historical Society during a ceremony at the Air Force Academy in Colorado Springs.

== Early life ==
Brown (née Babnik, often misspelled Babnick) was born in Pueblo, Colorado, to Frank and Mary Babnik, immigrants from Slovenia. Her father worked at the railroad and her mother was a domestic helper. Her parents named her Mitzi, a Slovenian name, but she Americanized it to Mary. The oldest of the children, she had three younger siblings; her sister, Josephine, arrived in 1908, followed by two brothers, Frank in 1910 and Joseph in 1912. Brown spent her early childhood in the Bessemer and Grove neighborhoods of Pueblo. Her father abandoned the family around 1920, leaving her mother to raise the children.

Brown left elementary school when she was 12 years old to help support the family. She first obtained part-time domestic work for $5 a week. By lying about her age when she was 13, she was able to find a permanent job at the National Broom Factory, which paid 75 cents a day when she started; she ended up working there for 42 years. Her siblings contributed to the family financially by picking up chunks of coal on railroad tracks that had fallen from steam-engine trains.

Brown became a well-known dancer in Pueblo. She began dancing as a hobby in her early teens, winning her first dancing contest at the age of nineteen. She danced so often at the Arcadia Ballroom (now razed) on Fifth Street in downtown Pueblo that her nickname was "Arcadia Mary". During World War II she taught GIs how to dance. She had a saying: "My first love is my family, but dancing is my second."

== Hair donation ==
In 1943, she saw an advertisement in a Pueblo newspaper that said the government was looking for hair from women for the war effort, although no details were given as to how it would be used. The ad said only that they wanted blonde hair that was at least 22 inches long (56 cm), and which had not been treated with chemicals or hot irons.

Brown's hair was 34 inches (86 cm) long and had never been cut, chemically treated or heated with irons. It was her most prized possession. She washed it with "pure soap" twice weekly and combed it twice a day; it stretched down to her knees when she combed it out. She normally wore it wrapped around her head in a braid, and as a result was known as the "lady with the crown".

The government purchasing agent at the Washington Institute of Technology told her that her hair would be used for meteorological instruments. She sent off samples, and they concluded that it would be appropriate. Brown agreed in 1944 to have it cut. The government offered to pay her for it in war savings stamps, but she refused, seeing it as her duty to help in the war effort. She ended up feeling traumatized by the loss of it, and cried for two months afterwards.

Brown's hair was used in scientific equipment to make precise measurements of humidity, paramount in the production of military aircraft and other war equipment.

== Later life ==
Brown married Carl Brown sometime after 1944, and became Mary "Mitzi" Babnik Brown. In 1947 she became vice president of the State Federation of Labor, the first woman to hold that position. She also became an active member of the Pueblo Democratic party, and was the vice president and president of the Slovenian Lodge SNPJ (Slovenian National Benefit Society). She spent her last years of her life in the 300 block of Spring Street in Pueblo.

== Awards and honors ==
- Brown received a special achievement award on November 17, 1990, from the Colorado Aviation Historical Society in a ceremony at the U.S. Air Force Academy. She was inducted into their Hall of Fame.
- Paul Harvey told Brown's story on his nationally broadcast program The Rest of the Story, on November 19, 1990.
- The city of Pueblo, Colorado, declared November 22, 1991, as "Mary Babnik Brown Day". The formal ceremony of medical personnel at a banquet at the Pueblo Country Club was recorded by NBC-TV. It aired the following month on NBC's The Story Behind the Story.

== Norden bombsight myth ==
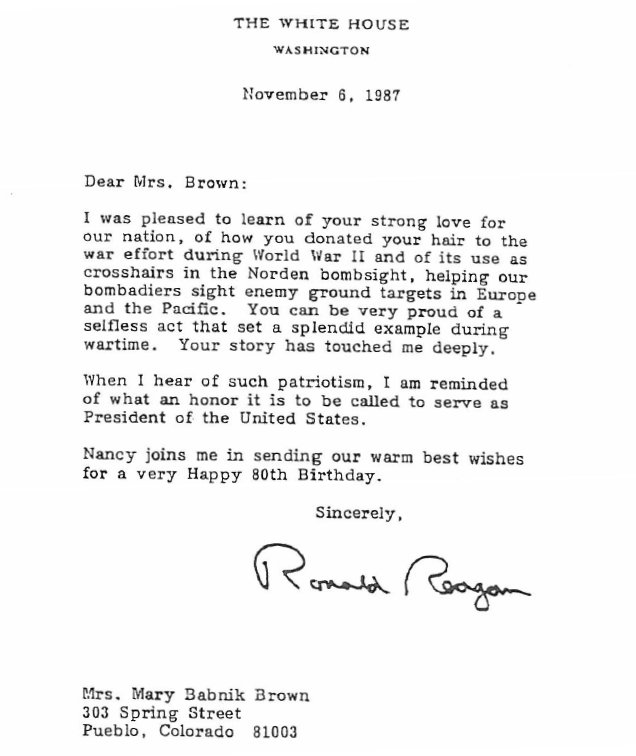
Reagan's letter from November 6, 1987 helped perpetuate the myth Mary's hair was used in the Norden bombsight

For many years it was incorrectly claimed that her hair was used to make the crosshairs in the Norden bombsight, a myth perpetuated by notable personalities such as President Ronald Reagan and radio personality Paul Harvey. The crosshairs on the Norden bombsight are etched into a glass reticle; no human hair is used.

== Bibliography ==
- McHugh, Erin (2008). Who? What? When? Where? Why?: A Substantial Gathering of Intriguing & Delightful Knowledge. Reader's Digest Association, Inc. ISBN 978-0-7621-0557-1.
- Read, Phyllis J.; Witlieb, Bernard L. (1992). The Book of Women's Firsts: Breakthrough Achievements of Almost 1,000 American Women. Random House Information Group. ISBN 978-0-679-40975-5.
