= Lotfernrohr 7 =

Bombsight of most Luftwaffe bombers

The Carl Zeiss Lotfernrohr 7 (Lot meant "Vertical" and Fernrohr meant "Telescope"), or Lotfe 7, was the primary series of bombsights used in most Luftwaffe level bombers, similar to the United States' Norden bombsight, but much simpler to operate and maintain. Several models were produced and eventually completely replaced the simpler Lotfernrohr 3 and BZG 2 bombsights. The Lotfe 7C, appearing in January 1941, was the first one to have gyroscopic stabilization.

== Design ==
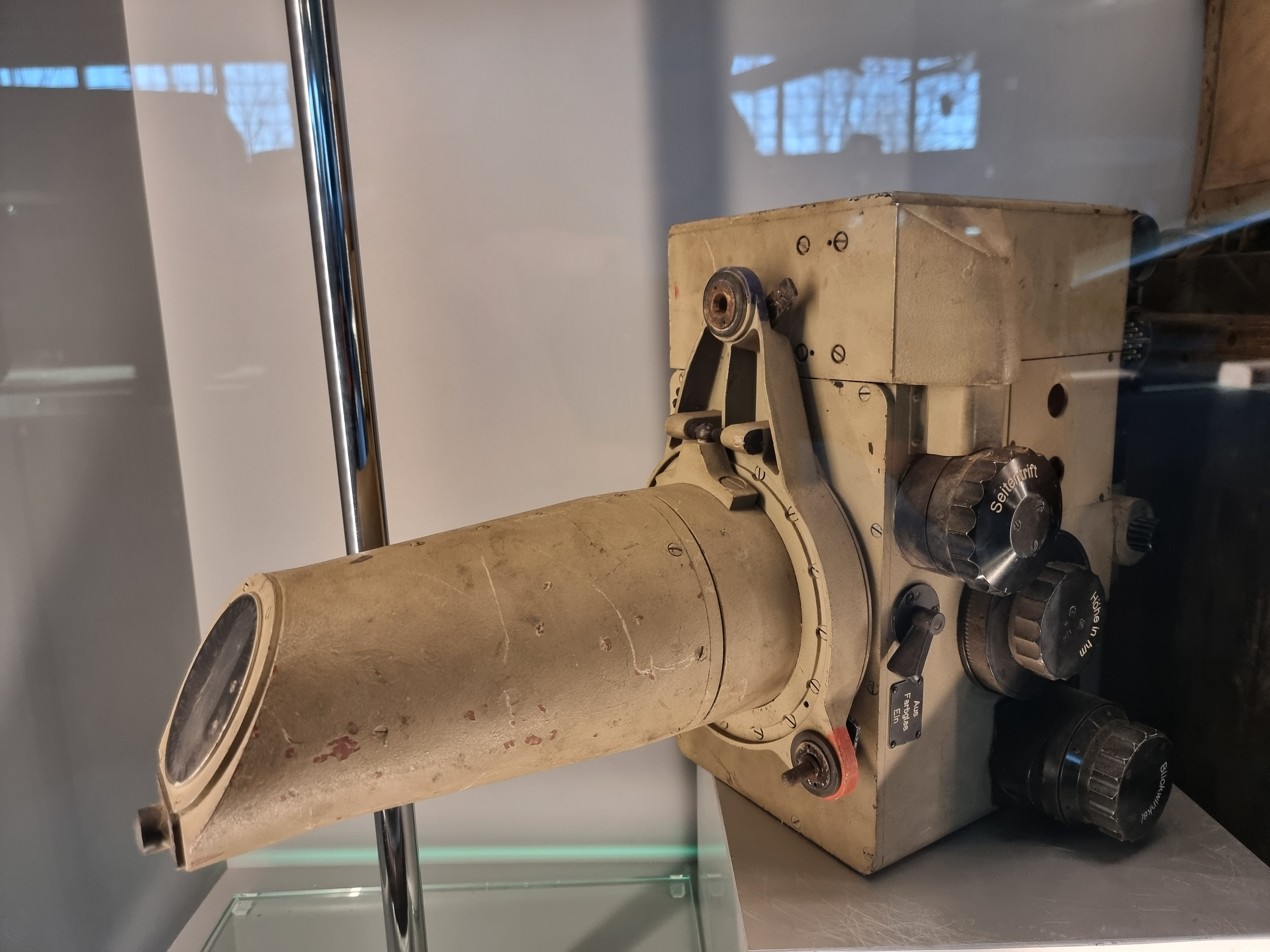
Lotfernrohr 7 D-1 at the Polish Aviation Museum.

In spite of the security precautions, the entire Norden system had been passed to the Germans before the war started. A member of the German Duquesne Spy Ring, Herman W. Lang, who had been employed by the Carl L. Norden Corporation (manufacturers of the Norden bombsight), was able to provide vital details of the new bombsight to the Abwehr. During a visit to Germany in 1938, Lang conferred with German military authorities (Oberst Nikolaus Ritter of the Abwehr) and reconstructed sketches and plans of the confidential materials from memory.

The Norden consisted of two primary parts, the optical system, and a large stabilization platform. Both were complex and had to be separately maintained to keep them operational.

German instruments were actually fairly similar to the Norden, even before World War II. In the Lotfe 7, a similar set of gyroscopes provided a stabilized platform for the bombardier to sight through, although the more complex interaction between the bombsight and autopilot of the Norden was not used. The Lotfe 7 was dramatically simpler, consisting of a single metal box containing the vast majority of the mechanism, with a tube (Rohr) extending out of the bottom with a mirror that reflected the image of the target into a small telescope in the box. The mechanisms combined the functions of the Norden's stabilizer and optics, moving the mirror to stabilize the image as well as tracking the target. The controls were likewise much simpler than the Nordens', consisting primarily of three large knurled knobs to adjust aim.

== Operation ==
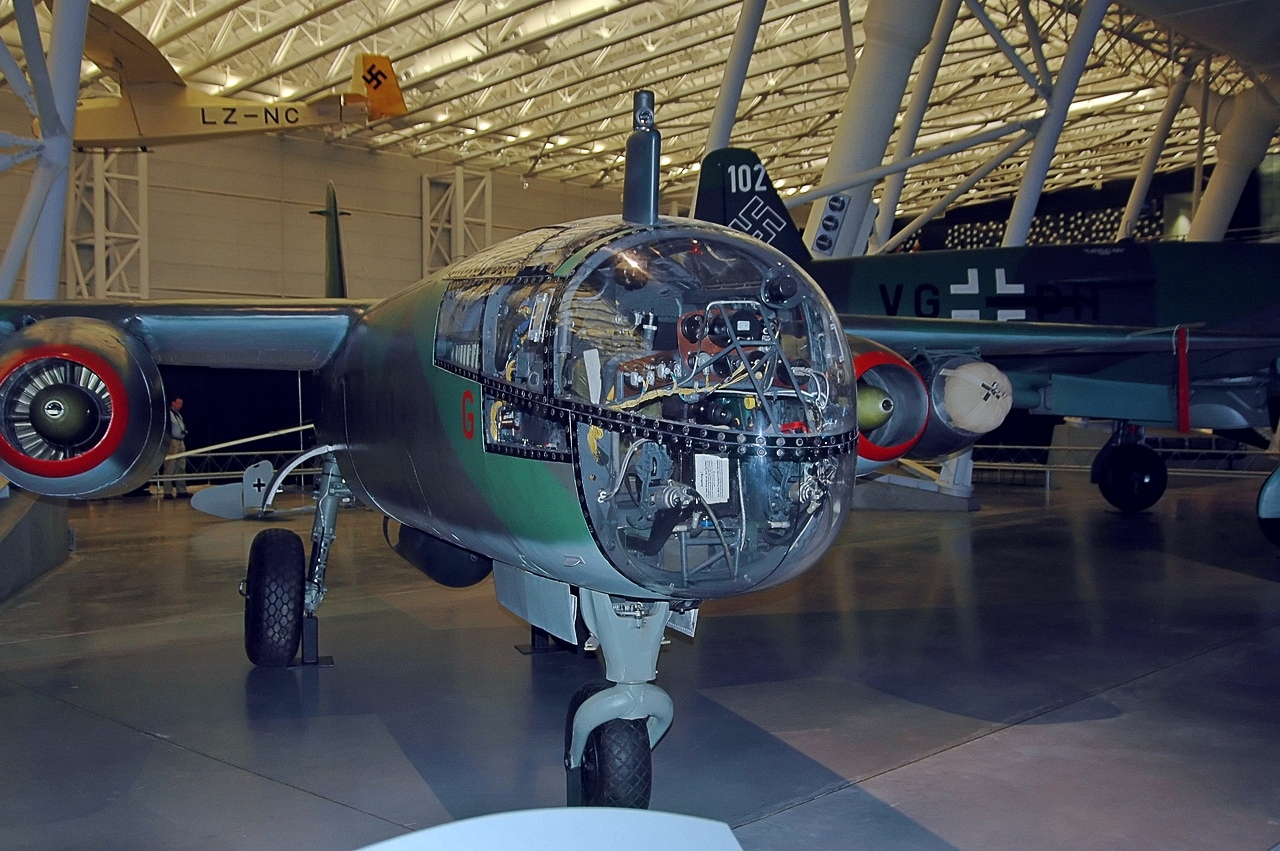
Arado Ar 234, The sight window of the Lotfe 7 is visible under the fuselage, ahead of the front leg of the landing gear.

Operation was fairly similar to the Norden. The bombardier would first locate the target in the bombsight and continue to adjust the dials until it remained motionless in the eyepiece. This allowed the bombsight to calculate the wind speed from the cancelled out drift rate, which in turn allowed to make an accurate calculation of groundspeed. Unlike the Norden, the Lotfe 7 could view targets directly in front of the aircraft, so the bombardier could use the real target for adjustments, rather than having to "tune" the instruments on a test target located closer to the aircraft. The bombsight could be used against targets 90° to 40° in front of the aircraft, and up to 20° on either side. On final approach, the autopilot was engaged, while the bombsight adjusted the flight path in response to last-minute changes by the bombardier. Bomb release was normally automatic in order to reduce timing errors.

The Lotfe 7 was normally installed near the nose of the aircraft with the mirror tube projecting through the fuselage to the outside of the aircraft. In most installations, like those in the Junkers Ju 88 or Heinkel He 111, the tube ended in a fairing under the fuselage with a protruding flat window in front. In other cases, like the Arado Ar 234 or the prototype bomber conversions of the Messerschmitt Me 262, the tube was open to the air, mounted so the mirror window was almost flush with the fuselage line. In the case of the single-seat Ar 234, the bombsight was difficult to access, so the autopilot was engaged first, allowing the pilot to remove the control yoke and access the bombsight.

After the war about a thousand unused Lotfe 7's were found in the Zeiss factories and shipped to the USSR. There was an attempt to use them in the B-25 Mitchell to replace the much more complex Norden, but the Lotfe 7 interacted badly with the Soviet-designed Si-1 autopilot and the problems were never fixed.

== Versions ==
- Lotfe 7 - Junkers Ju 88
- Lotfe 7A - Heinkel He 111H-5
- Lotfe 7B - Heinkel He 177A
- Lotfe 7C - Arado Ar 234, He 177A, Ju 88
- Lotfe 7D - Ar 234, Focke-Wulf Fw 200, Ju 88
- Lotfe 7H - Ju 88, Fw 200, Messerschmitt Me 262A-2a/U2
- Lotfe 7K - Ar 234, Me 262A-2a/U2
- Lotfe 7K-2 - Me 262A-2a/U2

== Specifications for Lotfernrohr 7C ==
- Height: 662 mm (26.1 in)
- Width: 350 mm (14 in)
- Depth of Lotfernrohr: 390 mm (15 in)
- Weight, complete: 28 kg (62 lb)
- Power requirement: 90 W without heating, 190 W with heating (under +5 °C)
- Magnification: 1.4x
- Field of View: 35°, equivalent to 630 m (2,070 ft) at a range of 1,000 m (3,300 ft)
- Range of movement for the sight tube: +80° to -20°

=== Limits of operation ===
- Altitude above target: 100–850 m (330–2,790 ft) altitude non-synchronized; 850–10,000 m (2,790–32,810 ft) altitude synchronized
- True Air Speed: 150–600 km/h (93–373 mph)
