= Low Level Bombsight, Mark III =

Optical bombsight used by the Royal Navy and RAF

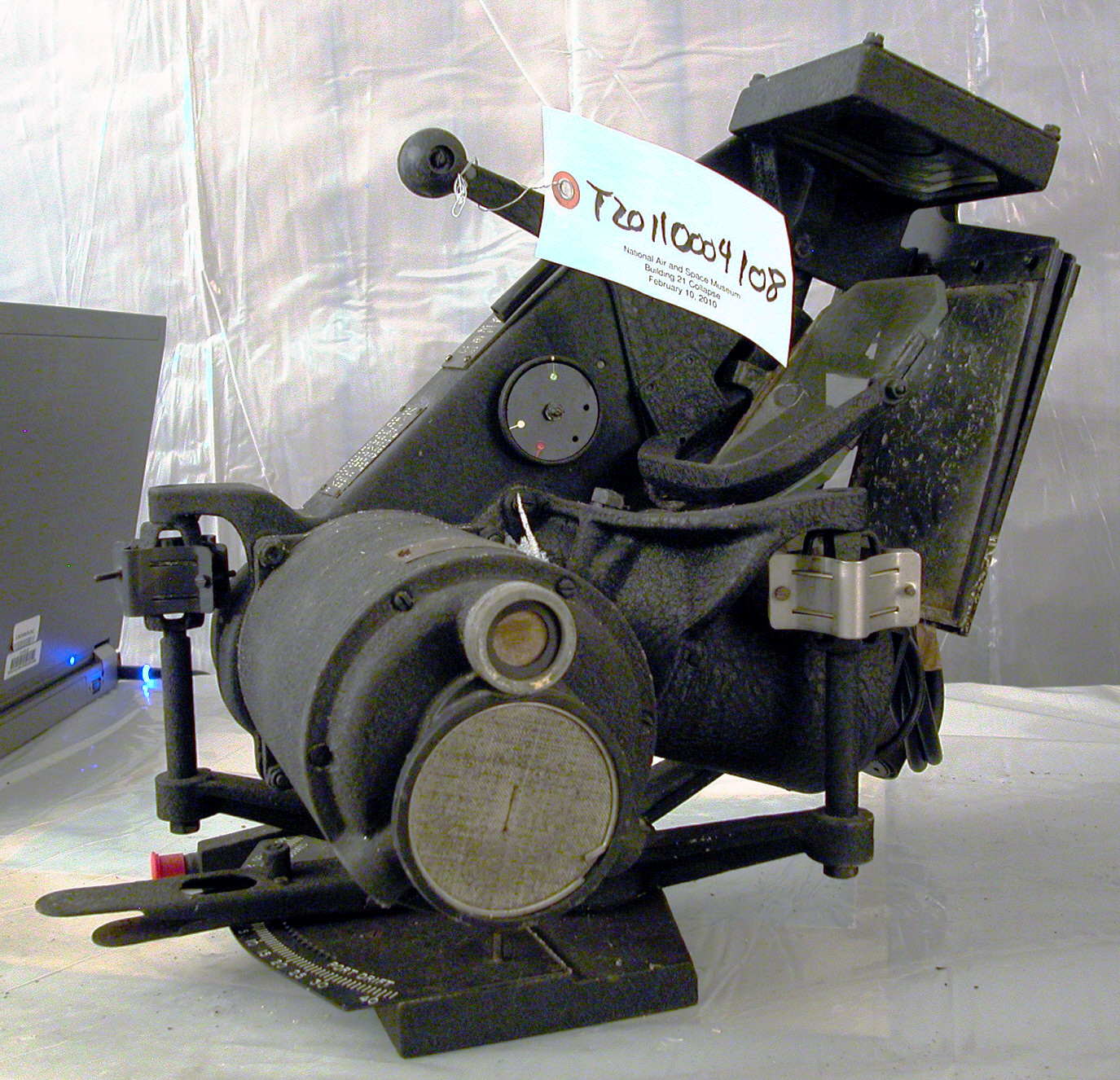
The Low Level Bombsight Mk. III consisted of two parts, the computor, and the sighting head, shown here. The bomb aimer looked through the glass plates to see an image of moving horizontal lines, and released the bombs when their motion matched the motion of the target.

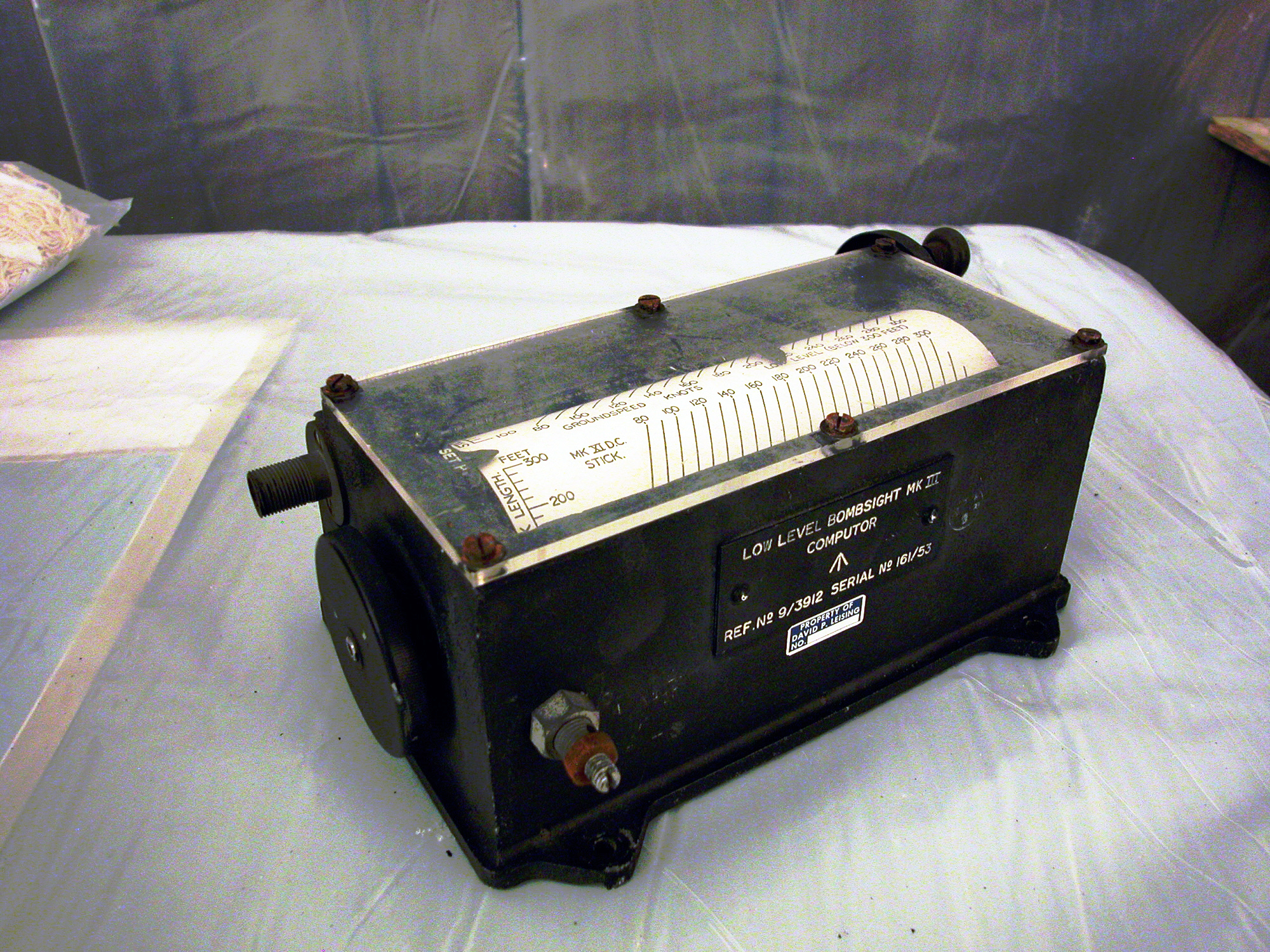
The computor for the Mk. III was very simple, with inputs for the airspeed and altitude only. The range can be read off the series of lines on the white cylinder visible through the perspex window.

The Low Level Bombsight, Mark III, sometimes known as the Angular Velocity Sight, was a Royal Air Force (RAF) bombsight designed for attacks by aircraft flying below 1,000 feet (300 m) altitude. It combined components of the Mark XIV bomb sight with a new mechanical computer. It featured a unique solution for timing the drop, projecting a moving display onto a reflector sight that matched the apparent motion of the target at the right instant.

The Mk. III was designed for, and mostly used by, Coastal Command aircraft in order to attack submarines. In this role, it was found to increase the chance of destroying a U-boat by 35%, and damaging it by 60%. It also saw some use in Bomber Command on the De Havilland Mosquito in the tactical role, and in a single case, on the Avro Lancaster. It remained in use in the post-war era, equipping the Avro Shackleton throughout that aircraft's lifetime until 1991.

== History ==
In 1941 Bomber Command's Operational Research Section (ORS) had been investigating Coastal Command operations against German U-boats, which until this time had been only moderately successful at best. Comparing average bombing accuracy with the bombs being used, they suggested that a larger 600 pounds (270 kg) bomb be developed for attacking U-boats on the surface. This study also demonstrated that the aircraft were able to aim the bombs accurately in azimuth, but they had serious problems determining the proper instant to release them. This suggested that a new bombsight dedicated to the role be developed.

Early examples of the Mk. III were delivered to two squadrons. At a 16 December 1942 meeting of Coastal Command's Anti-Submarine Committee, No. 59 Squadron RAF reported that three aimers were selected to make bombing runs on a stationary target, and then again on one moving at 8 knots (15 km/h; 9.2 mph). Of the forty-two bombs dropped on the moving target, the average range error was 18 yards (16 m). In one example they demonstrated 6 yards (5.5 m) error from 800 feet (240 m) in a level attack, and only 5 yards (4.6 m) when dropped from 400 feet (120 m) while pulling up from a 100 foot (30 m) approach. Wing Commander G.C.C. Bartlett and his navigator Pilot Officer Longmuir stated that the sight was a great advance over previous systems.

Patrick Blackett, head of the ORS, was also attending the meeting. He reported that the earlier Low Level Bombsight, Mark II produced 20 yards (18 m) error when flying level, as did the Mk. XIV. He suggested that both could be improved through the addition of a radio altimeter. However, others in the group were not convinced, with Air Vice-Marshal Wilfrid Oulton expressing his opinion of the Mk. XIV that he "never trusted that device."

Considering these reports, Air Chief Marshal Philip Joubert, made the Mk. III an operational requirement. However, apparently due to limited supplies, he limited its use to patrols over the Atlantic, as opposed to those taking place over the Bay of Biscay. Attacks over Biscay generally took place at night, and were carried out by eye with the aid of a Leigh Light. However, an 8 January 1944 report by the Coastal Command Development Unit reported on attempts to use the Mk. III with the Leigh Light on a Wellington, and suggested that the Mk. III be fitted to all aircraft and the bombs dropped by the light operator rather than the pilot.

=== Strike Wings ===
It was the problem of accurately determining range that had led both the RAF and Royal Navy to believe that torpedoes were "always considered to be the most effective weapon against shipping at sea." This pre-war thinking proved to be largely wrong, and repeated attempts to attack convoys with torpedoes produced little result. A joint Admiralty/Air Ministry meeting on 11 June 1942 led to the formation of the Aircraft Torpedo Attack Committee to improve operations. Among several suggestions of their own, in August they contacted ORS to consider the issue as well.

The ORS report was delivered in December 1942. They demonstrated that torpedoes could only be dropped from low altitudes and speeds, or risked breaking upon impact with the water. They also tended to dive after entering the water, which make them largely useless when attacking convoys hugging the shoreline in shallow waters. But most of all they were expensive, which was of little concern when attacking capital ships, but of rather questionable value against tramp steamers. They went on to suggest that bombs would be much more effective against small ships, especially if the Mark XIV bombsight was available.

In one of the few wartime examples, the Air Ministry did not take all of ORS' advice. Henry Tizard sounded a contrary note in a January 1943 letter where he stated:

Although I am one of those who have been enthusiastic about the Mark XIV sight and regret that it was not available for use long ago, I have a feeling that your ORS may be a bit too optimistic about its operational value against ships from a height of 4,000 feet.

This coincided with the introduction of the Strike Wing tactics in Coastal Command. Previously, attacks would be made by a variety of aircraft organized into loose groups, with fighter protection. Strike Wings were based on attacks by groups of identical high-speed aircraft that would arrive as a single force, make a quick attack, and then fly away. This not only eliminated the problem that the first group to arrive would alert any anti-aircraft batteries in the area to any slower aircraft soon to appear, it also made it much easier for defensive fighters to provide cover as the group flew together. These sorts of attacks began in November 1942, and were immediately successful. By early 1943, a wholesale conversion to Strike Wings was underway, with slower aircraft like the Handley Page Hampden removed from service.

The introduction of Strike Wings led to some use of the Mk. III, as well as older bombsights. Late in the war, Bomber Command passed off its obsolete Handley Page Halifax bombers to Coastal Command, who re-equipped them with the Mk. III and used them in long-range strikes against German ships in the Skagerrak and Kattegat. The Mk. XIV was ultimately never used by Coastal Command in the anti-shipping role.

=== Bomber Command ===
Bomber Command was aware of the Mk. III through its development, and as its own operations expanded to include more tactical attacks at low level, Arthur Harris ordered it into production for Bomber Command use in October 1942.

Coastal Command had priority on deliveries and only small numbers reached Bomber Command. The first examples arrived in May 1943 and were fit to Douglas Boston bombers of 2 Group. In 1944 the sight was trialled on the Avro Lancasters of No. 617 Squadron RAF, the Dambusters, who carried out a single low-level attack with them in late 1944. Most examples sent to Bomber Command equipped a small number of De Havilland Mosquito aircraft in No. 627 Squadron RAF (who normally operated as pathfinders) and No. 8 Group RAF (Pathfinder Force).

=== Post war ===
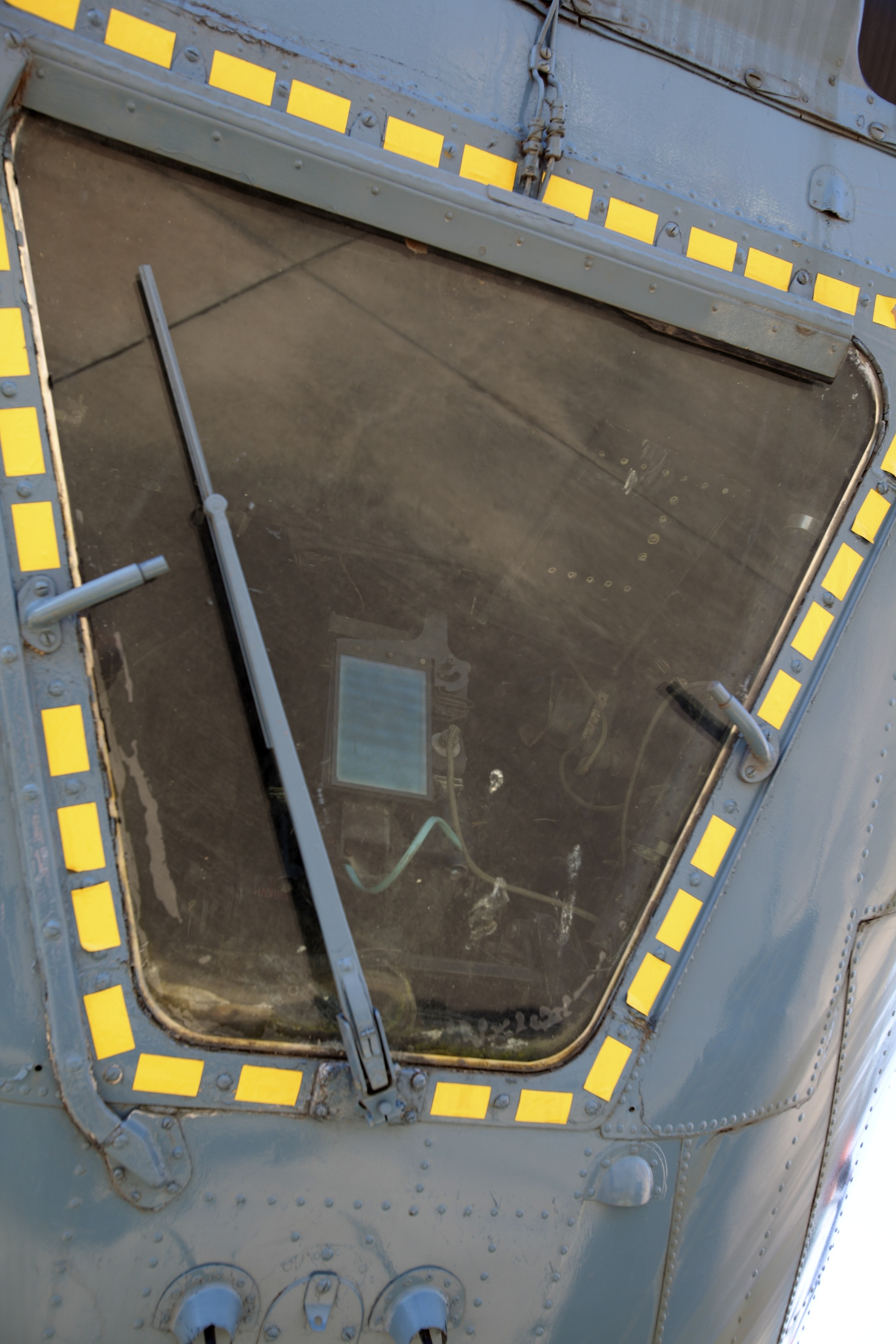
The Low Level sight can be seen in the bomb aimer's window of this retired South African Shackleton.

The sight remained with Coastal Command after the war, equipping the Avro Shackleton through that type's lifetime until 1991.

== High vs. low level bombing ==
The basic concept behind any bombsight is the determination of the range, the distance the bombs will move forward after they are dropped from the aircraft. When dropped at relatively low speeds, as in the case of World War II aircraft, the primary force on the bomb when it leaves the aircraft is gravity. Acting alone, gravity will accelerate the bomb downward, and when this is added to the initial forward velocity given to it by the motion of the aircraft, the path becomes a parabola. This path is modified by drag, which reduces the initial forward velocity over time, causing the path to become more vertical. In addition, the wind can move the bomb as it falls, but given the well-streamlined shapes and high density, this tends to be relatively a small effect.

In typical examples of bombs dropped from altitudes of 20,000 feet (6,100 m), the range will be on the order of 7,500 feet (2,300 m). Simple trigonometry reveals the range angle, the angle the target appears at when the bomber is at the correct range:

$$\arctan\left(\frac{7500}{20000}\right)\approx 20 \text{ degrees}$$

This angle is measured in front of the vertical line below the bomber; 20 degrees is just in front of the bomber. Conventional bombsights of the era consisted of some form of iron sight or reflector sight that was set to that angle. Since the target was well below the aircraft during the approach, typically only the bomb aimer could see it. Looking along the line extending out the front of the bombsight, they would see if the bomber was going to pass over the target, and issue corrections to the pilot if it wasn't. Once they were lined up, they waited for the target to pass through the horizontal line of the crosshairs, and released.

Although the effect of the wind after the drop is small, the wind's effects on the aircraft in flight are not. Winds at typical bombing altitudes tend to be fairly strong, and it was not uncommon for there to be a 40 miles per hour (64 km/h) wind. Compared to the aircraft's typical 200 miles per hour (320 km/h) speed, this represents 20% of the overall velocity of the aircraft when it drops its bombs. Measuring this wind is accomplished by looking through the bombsight at objects on the ground, and then calculating the angle needed to fly to offset this motion. High-level bombsights generally spent a considerable amount of their design complexity on trying to account for the effect of wind.

In the pre-war period, it was found that a significant source of error was due to the bombsight not being level with the ground when the bomb aimer was trying to sight through it. This was especially a problem during the initial part of the bomb run. In order to turn the aircraft onto the correct approach, the pilot would bank the aircraft, during which time the bombsight no longer pointed at the target. The bomb aimer had to wait until the turn was complete and the aircraft settled down to level again before they could see if the new line was correct. This led to the introduction of simple stabilizer systems, today better known as inertial platforms, to keep the sights properly levelled in the roll axis as the bomber turned, eliminating these delays.

If we consider the same bomb being dropped from an aircraft travelling at low level, 1,000 feet (300 m), the range is about 1,000 feet as well. This means that the target is at about 45 degrees at the instant of drop, and well out in front of the aircraft during the approach. In contrast to the high-altitude case, the pilot can see the target for most of the approach, and all of the approach if they start a slight dive, or glide, during the last moments, pulling up just prior to release. This eliminates the need for roll stabilization because the bombsight is no longer needed to adjust the flight path during the initial approach, instead, the sight has to be stabilized in pitch because the pilot will be pulling up right about the time to drop.

Additionally, because the wind tends to be slower at low altitudes, and attack aircraft generally travel faster, the relative effect of the wind is significantly less. Moreover, the pilot can easily adjust for any cross-wind visually without help from the bombsight. For this reason, a low-level bombsight simply doesn't need the same sort of windage correction complexity and can ignore it completely in most cases. This was the case in the Low Level sight, where the only inputs were speed and altitude.

=== Angular velocity principle ===
Another major difference between the high and low-level cases is timing the drop. In the high-altitude case, the target is far below the aircraft and appears to be moving directly rearward. A simple crosshairs is usually all that is needed, with the range angle dialled into the sights and the bomb aimer releasing the bombs when they pass through the horizontal hairline. Because the target moves with a constant speed and relatively slowly, accurate timing is not difficult to achieve.

At low altitudes, this approach does not work well. When approaching a target from low altitude it initially appears to be not moving at all, just growing larger. Later in the approach, it begins to move downward, and it is normally during this period that the bombs need to be dropped. It is only when the aircraft begins to pass over the target that it has significant rearward motion, at which point it is too late to drop the bombs. This means the bomb aimer has to release the bombs while the target was moving only slowly in the sights but accelerating, making proper timing a significant problem. This is not a minor concern; a light bomber flying at 350 miles per hour (560 km/h), or 500 feet (150 m) per second, accuracy under 1/10 of a second is needed to place a bomb within its lethal range of 50 feet (15 m).

Consider the apparent motion of a line of telephone poles beside a road as seen from a car. At long distances, they appear to have no motion, but they grow larger as the car approaches. At closer distances, they appear to begin moving to the side, away from the car. The angular velocity of any one of the poles is a function of its distance in front of the car, the speed of the car, and the distance between the roadway and the poles. Thus, any particular angular velocity corresponds directly to a distance. In the case of an aircraft, one of the poles represents the target, the speed of the car is the aircraft's airspeed, and the distance between the road and the poles is the aircraft's altitude.

The Low Level sight used this angular velocity principle to time the drop. The aircraft's altitude and the type of bomb being used were used to calculate the time that the bomb would take to reach the ground, and when that was multiplied by the airspeed, the range was produced. The ballistics did not have to be more complex than that, there simply wasn't enough time for drag to be significant. The derivative of this calculation reveals the angular velocity of an object at that range as seen from the bomber's altitude and speed. To simplify operation, all of this was carried out in a simple mechanical computer.

The computer was connected to a display that showed this angular speed as a series of lines moving downwards at that angular velocity. When the target first became visible it would have little vertical speed, so the lines would be moving down the screen faster than the target. As the aircraft approaches, the target begins to move down the screen at an increasing rate. At the instant the two were equal, the bombs were dropped.

== Description ==
=== Basic layout ===
The Mk. III used a number of components from the Mk. XIV, as well as much of its basic layout. Like the Mk. XIV, the Mk. III was built in two separate components, the computor that calculated the range angle, and the sighting head that displayed this for the bomb aimer. The sighting head was located in the bomb aimer's window at the front of the aircraft. The separate computor cabinet was positioned on the left side of the fuselage, and two units were connected via an electrical cable.

This entire sight head mechanism was mounted on the same base as the Mk. XIV, which carried a standardized mounting system that clamped onto two vertical metal rods on the left side of the sight. This system was originally designed for the Course Setting Bomb Sight, and reused for the Mk. XIV, and now the Mk. III. The mounting base also retained the system for turning the entire sighting head to the left or right, which the bomb aimer used to keep the vertical line centered on the target and to call any required corrections to the pilot if he noticed any sideways drift. Unlike the Mk. XIV, this motion was unpowered. Although the computor was much smaller than the Mk. XIV's, it too could clamp into the same fittings in the aircraft. This allowed a Mk. III and Mk. XIV to be easily swapped in the field.

=== Internal workings ===
The computor for the Mk. III had only two inputs, one for airspeed and the other for altitude. Both were dialled in on large wheels positioned on either end of the long rectangular cabinet. The top of the cabinet was a perspex window that displayed the calculation.

The altitude wheel was connected to the main part of the calculator, a large metal cylinder marked with lines showing the time it would take for the bombs to reach the surface. The operator selected a value by rotating the cylinder with respect to fixed pointers on either end of the case. The airspeed wheel was connected to a screw that moved another pointer back and forth along the long axis of the cylinder. The tip of the pointer was positioned so it could be read against the lines on the cylinder. The cylinder carried several sets of lines to account for the ballistics of different types of bombs and the number being dropped in a group, or stick.

The cylinder was also connected to an electrical mechanism that output a varying current based on the settings. This was fed into a motor on the sighting head. The motor was calibrated to turn at a fixed speed depending on the output fed to it from the computor. The motor turned a ring with lines inscribed on it, positioned in front of a projector system. The entire mechanism was housed on a large triangular case on the left of the sighting head. This was the primary mechanical difference between it and the Mk. XIV; the Mk. XIV lacked this projector.

The lines were projected onto a large rectangular glass plate at the very front of the sighting head. Located directly behind this plate was a second glass plate, the main reflector sight from the Mk. XIV. This was connected to the projector housing on the left side, where it was geared to the Sperry artificial horizon from Mk. XIV, but rotated to keep the plate stable in pitch rather than roll. A handle on the left of the plate, retained from the Mk. XIV, allowed the bomb aimer to rotate it up or down to cover the target.

=== Operation ===
Operating the Mk. III in combat was very simple. At some point during the approach the bomb aimer would dial in the aircraft's speed and altitude; although these changed during the approach, in most cases the changes were small enough to ignore. At this point the moving lines would appear on the display. Initially, the target would be well out in front of the aircraft, so the bomb aimer would use the handle to rotate the reflector sight up. They would then use the rotating base plate to move the line left or right to cover the target, calling out any corrections needed to account for drift or the motion of the target.

As the aircraft approached the target, the vertical angle would increase and the bomb aimer would account for this by rotating the sight downward progressively. Normally the drop would occur when the target was about 45 degrees below the aircraft, so this needed to be adjusted only once or twice. At some point, the motion of the lines and the target would be equal and the bombs would be released by pressing a button on the end of a flexible cable connected to the timed release system positioned to the right of the bombsight.
