= Drift Sight =

WW1 bombsight that used wind speed mrasurement to adjust for horizontal drift

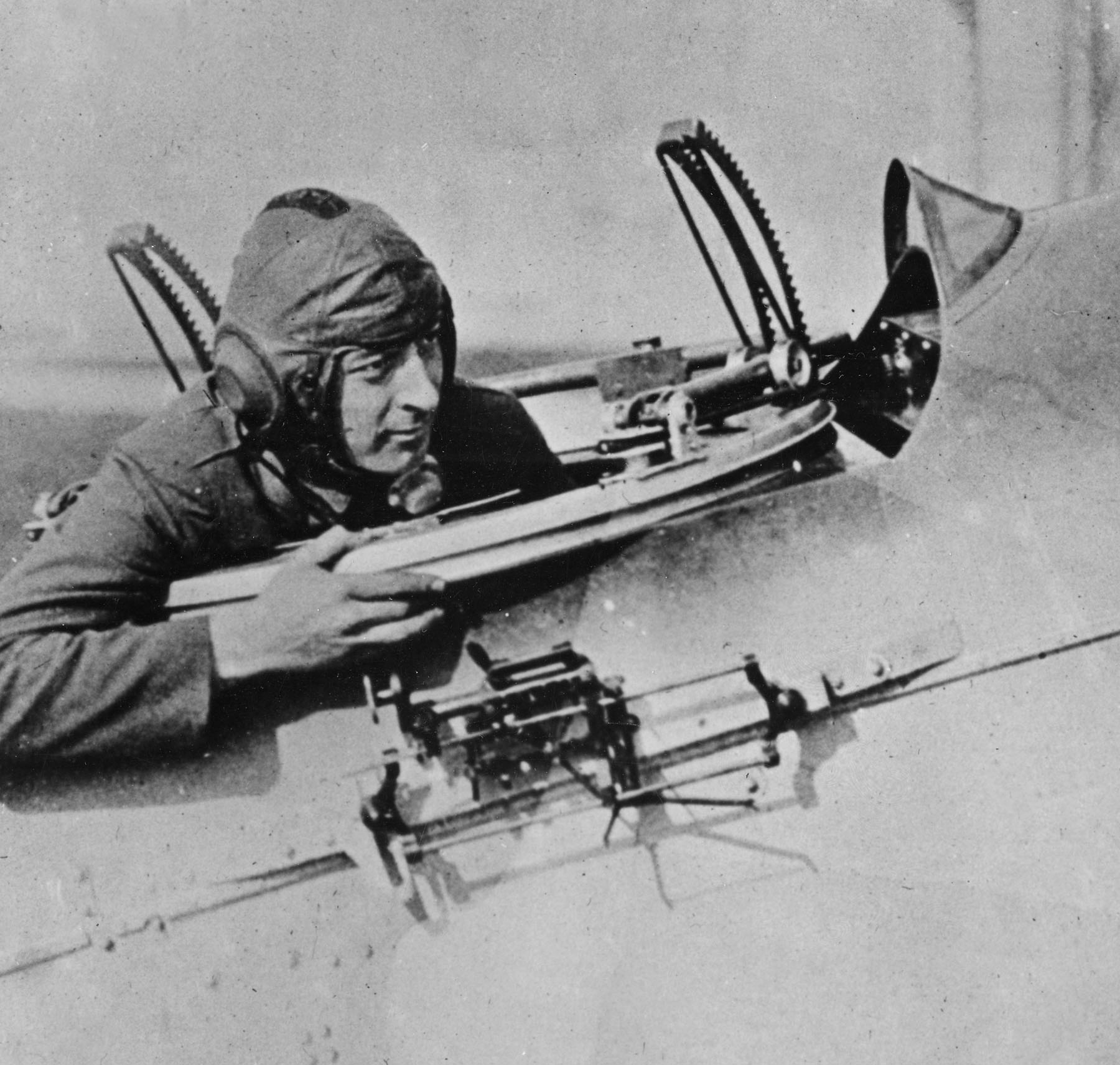
A Mk. I Drift Sight mounted on the side of an Airco DH.4. The lever just in front of the bomb aimer's fingertips sets the altitude, the wheels near his knuckles set the wind and airspeed. The two raised racks are part of a Scarff ring machine gun mount and are unrelated to the Sight.

The Drift Sight was a bombsight developed by Harry Wimperis in 1916 for the Royal Naval Air Service (RNAS). It used a simple mechanical device to measure the wind speed from the air, and used that measurement to calculate the wind's effects on the trajectory of the bombs. The Drift Sight eliminated the need for a stopwatch to perform this calculation, as on earlier devices, and greatly eased the bomb aimer's workload.

The Drift Sight was quickly introduced into RNAS service and quickly thereafter by the Royal Flying Corps (RFC) as well. In British service, Wimperis' Course Setting Bomb Sight (CSBS) started replacing the Drift Sight in 1917, but it remained in widespread use in the US Army Air Service into the 1920s. In US use the Drift Sight is often referred to as the Wimperis sight, but this name is more commonly applied to the CSBS, especially in Commonwealth air forces.

== History ==
=== Early bombsights ===
Prior to the introduction of the Drift Sight, bombsights were generally very simple systems of very limited accuracy. The primary pre-World War I device in RNAS service was the "Lever Sight" which had to be held out of the cockpit in one hand by the pilot while flying the aircraft with the other. The Central Flying School bombsight (CFS) replaced this in 1915, but was difficult to install in the cockpit. The CFS was in turn replaced by the Equal Distance Sight (EDS) designed by in 1916 by Warrant Officer Scarff, better known for the Scarff ring. The EDS allowed the bomb run parameters to be entered once and then left the pilot free to fly the plane.

Adjusting for the effects of wind was a difficult process. None of these sights had a way to calculate "drift", the sideways motion of the bombs due to wind. This meant the aircraft had to attack their targets along the wind line. Even in this direction, the wind would cause the bombs to fall long or short. To correct for this, on an extended run the bomb aimer would measure their speed over the ground using a stopwatch, calculate the wind speed, and then adjust their aim point based on that speed and their current altitude. This solution was difficult, time consuming, and prone to error.

=== Drift Sight ===
In 1916, Henry Wimperis started design of a new bombsight, working in collaboration with Scarff. His "Drift Sight" included a simple system for calculating the effects of wind.

This measurement was taken prior to the bomb run, using a secondary sighting system at the rear of the main bombsight. The pilot would first determine the direction of the wind, and estimated its speed. The estimated speed was dialled into the sight, which moved a metal rod at the back of the sight so it laid at an angle to the fuselage. The aircraft would then fly at right angles to the bomb line, which would cause the wind to push the aircraft sideways (unless this direction the aircraft is flying while doing this just happens to be directly upwind or downwind). Comparing the angle of motion of objects on the ground to the angle of the rod, the bomb aimer would adjust the angle of the rod until the two were equal. A scale at the end of the bar directly read the wind speed.

This adjustment also automatically moved sights at the front of the bombsight fore and aft, directly setting the bombsight to calculate the drift of the bombs due to the measured wind. Two sights were used, one for bombing directly upwind, and another for bombing directly downwind. The timing of the drop was set by dialling in the measured air speed, which moved the entire sighting system fore or aft, carrying the two "backsights" along with it (as well as the drift bar mechanism). Setting the altitude moved the foresight, below the backlights, setting the correct bombing angle.

The original design was only suitable for low-level use and was later known as the Low Height Drift Sight Mk. I. At higher altitudes the indicated airspeed - being measured by pitot tube instruments - was affected by differences in outside air pressure that rendered it increasingly inaccurate. (A correct ground speed is required for accurate bombing.) The Mk. IA was introduced for this role, including a simple adjustment between the airspeed and altitude settings that accounted for this effect. A third version was also introduced for use by Navy airships, which worked at much lower speeds and also had the advantage of being able to directly measure the windspeed by throttling their engines until they lay still over the water.

Although the Drift Sight was a significant improvement over earlier designs, it still required the aircraft to fly up or downwind on the final bomb run. For the RNAS this was a serious problem, as a submarine or ship would attempt to maneuver away if it spotted the attack, and thus upset the bomb run. Over land, as anti-aircraft guns grew more proficient, this became a serious concern as they would pre-sight for firing along the wind line, and using the bombsight under fire was difficult. There were instructions on how to use the Drift Sight for cross-wind bombing, but this was complex and apparently rarely used.

=== In service ===
The Drift Sight was introduced in 1916, and the simplicity of the device in terms of manufacture and mounting to the aircraft allowed it to quickly equip RNAS forces. By 1917 it was in widespread use in the RNAS, and was selected for the Handley Page O/400 bomber in RFC service as well. However, Wimperis was well aware of the shortcomings of the Drift Sight in terms of flying along the wind line, and was already testing his solution, the Course Setting Bomb Sight. The CSBS was only slightly more complex than the Drift Sight to build, adding a compass and another adjustment to the sights to account for cross-drift. Hundreds were in use by 1918, and had supplanted the Drift Sight by the war's end.

A major difference between the Drift Sight and CSBS was that the latter needed to sight below the aircraft, and was not as suitable for use on the side of the fuselage. This kept the Mk. IA in US Army Air Service use for some time, as they did not have dedicated bomber aircraft until after the war. Oddly, when development of new bombsights started in the 1920s, these were based on the Drift Sight design, not the CSBS. The US Navy, contrarily, developed their Mk. III design from the CSBS, and it was borrowed Mk. III sights that were used to sink the former German battleship Ostfriesland in 1921.

== Description ==
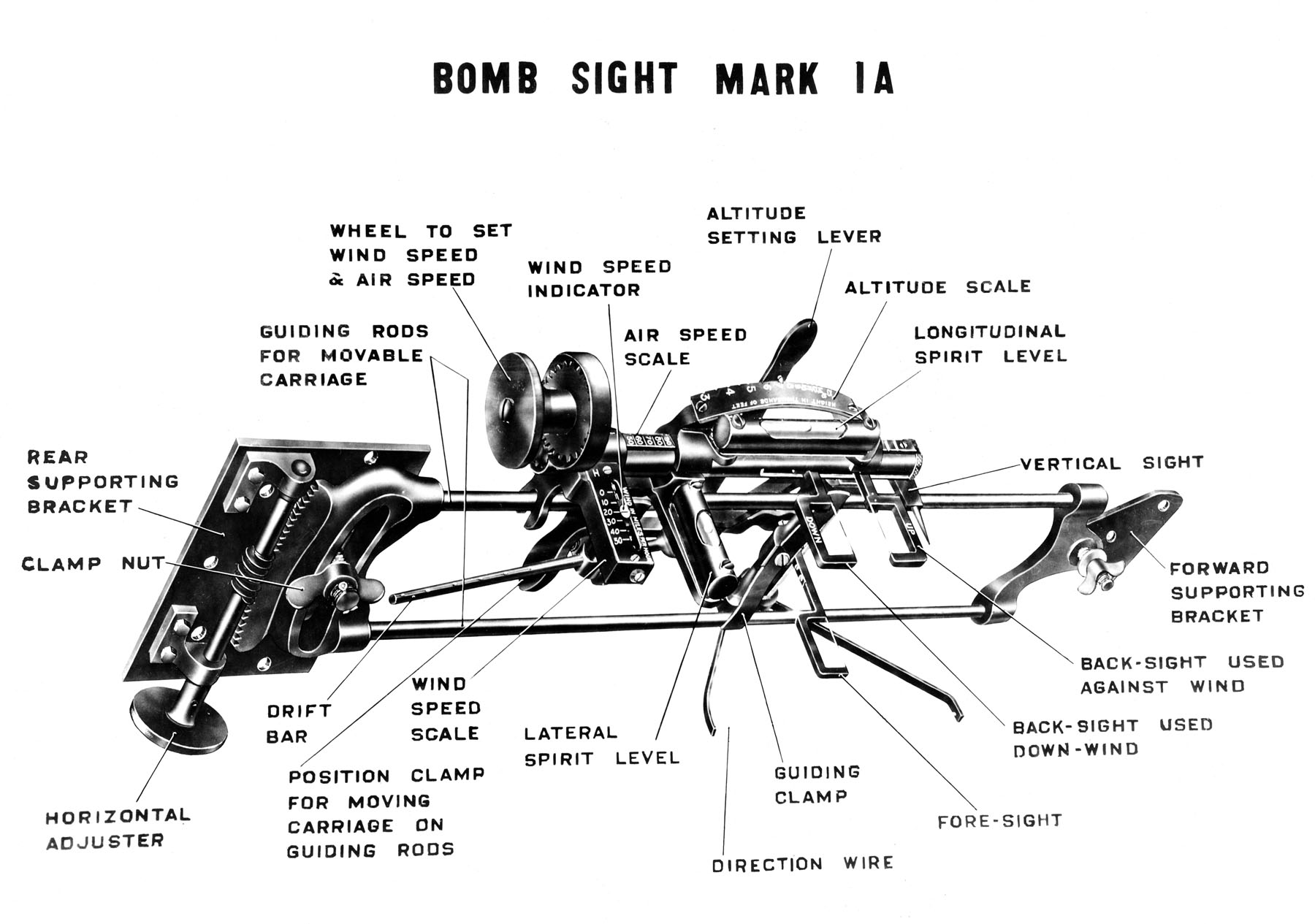
Labelled diagram of the various parts of the Mk. IA sight. The wires making up the sights for timing the drop are just visible, while the directional wire at the bottom is not.

Opening the adjacent diagram in a separate window will greatly ease the understanding of the following description.

The Drift Sight was mounted to the side of the aircraft using two brackets at the front and back of the sights. The forward bracket had a pivot point, and the rear a screw jack that rotated the entire sighting system up or down around the front bracket's pivot. This allowed fine adjustment of the levelling of the sight during flight to account for changes in trim, as measured on an attached spirit level. After making these adjustments the system was locked in position using wingnuts. This mounting system was common among early British bombsights, notably the Equal Distance Sight that led to the Drift Sight.

The main sighting system rode on two rods running fore and aft between the mounting brackets, allowing the bomb aimer to move it to a comfortable position for sighting. In the Equal Distance design, this movement was itself the main aiming mechanism, and could not be adjusted for ease of use as it was in the Drift Sight.

Sighting was accomplished in the manner of iron sights on rifles, and the Drift Sight used the same terminology of "foresight" and "backsight", although "lower" and "upper" would be more accurate physically. The fore and backsights were thin metal wires stretched across the opening of a C-shaped metal plate. The bombs were dropped when the wires of the foresight, backsight and target overlapped as seen from the bomb aimer's position. A separate "direction wire" ran fore-aft on a plate below the foresight, providing left-right aiming.

Altitude was set by moving a lever fore-and-aft against a scale, which rotated the foresight fore or aft, setting one half of the sight's bombing angle. Behind the altitude setting was an airspeed scale and a wheel to finely select the airspeed. This moved the backsights fore or aft to account for the other half of the sight's "range angle". In this respect the Drift Sight was similar to earlier bombsight designs.

Where it differed was in the addition of the "drift bar" setting at the extreme rear of the sighting system. The drift bar was a metal rod that extended rearward from the sight and was pivoted so it could rotated outward, away from the aircraft fuselage. Prior to the bomb run, the pilot or bomb aimer would dial in an estimated wind speed, which rotated the bar outward with increasing values. They would then look past the bar to any convenient objects on the ground, comparing its direction of motion to the line of the bar. Fine adjustments to the wind speed were made until the observed drift was directly along the line of the bar.

Changing the setting of the wind speed had the effect of moving the two backlights closer or further apart. This accounted for the effects of the wind on the trajectory of the bombs in addition to the airspeed setting. Two sights were used, one for bombing upwind and another for downwind.

As the Drift Sight only worked correctly if flying straight and level, the bombsight also includes two spirit levels.
