= Bombsight =

Aircraft system for aiming bombs

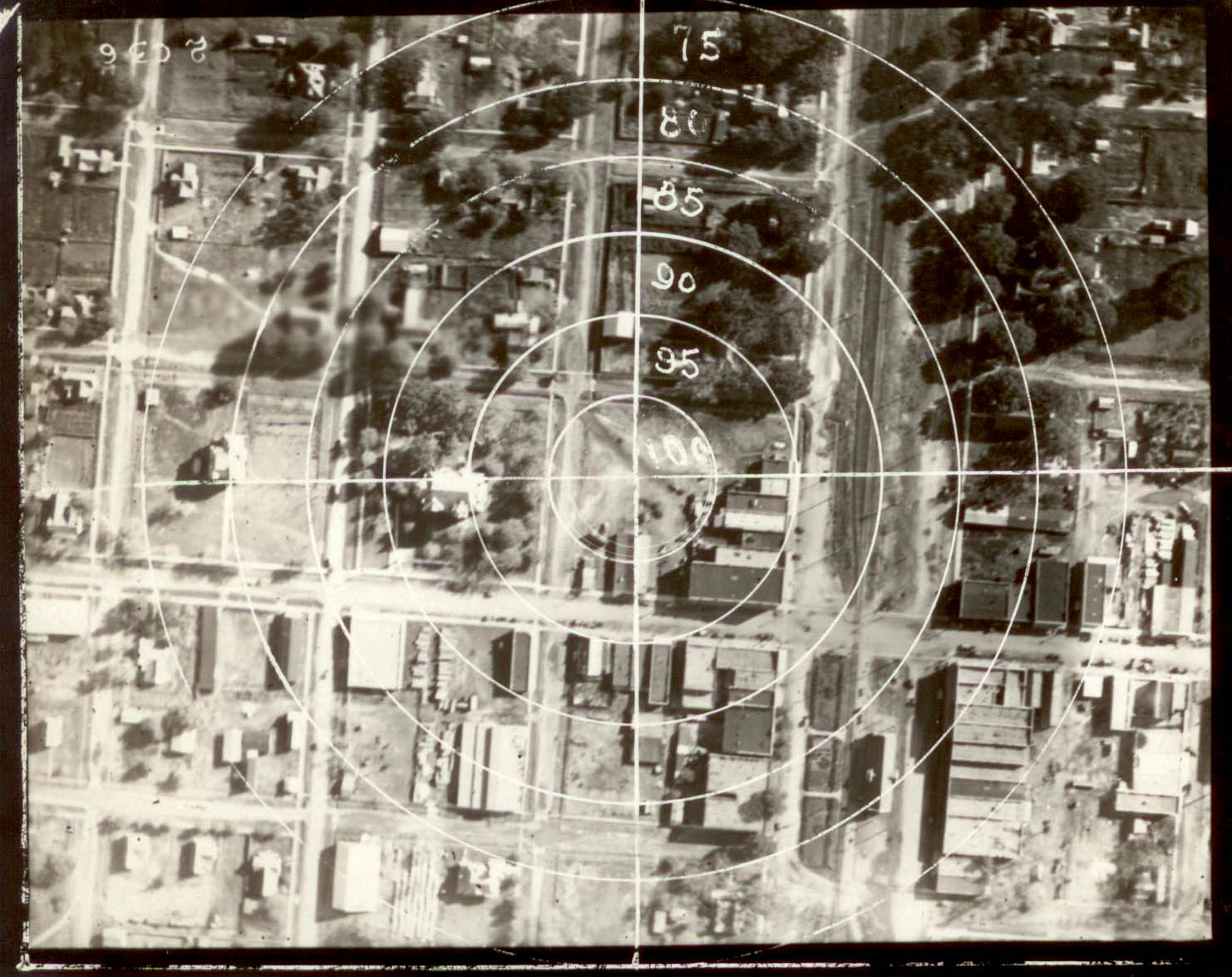
An early bombsight, 1910s

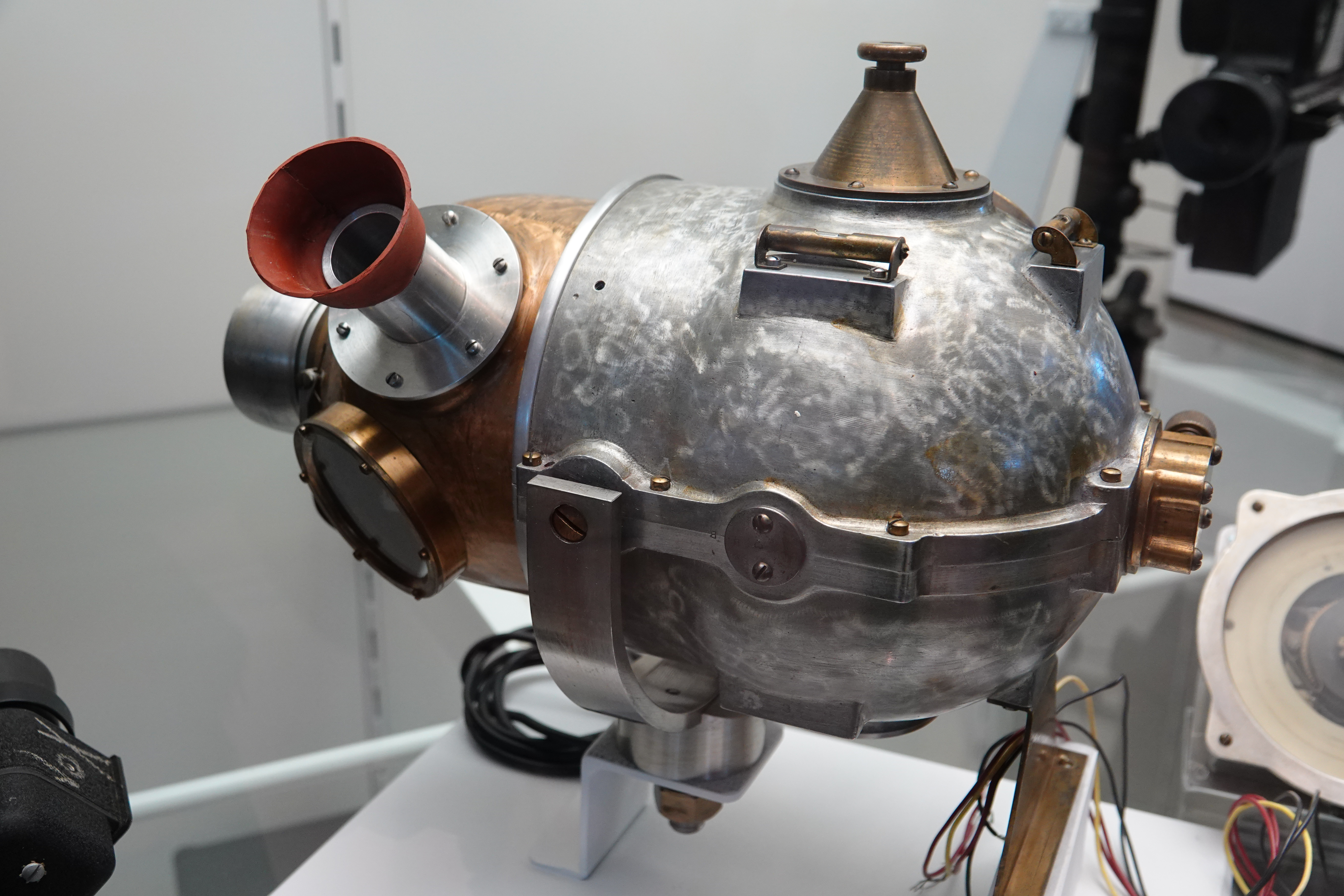
1923 Norden MK XI Bombsight Prototype

A bombsight is a device used by military aircraft to drop bombs accurately. Bombsights, a feature of combat aircraft since World War I, were first found on purpose-designed bomber aircraft and then moved to fighter-bombers and modern tactical aircraft as those aircraft took up the brunt of the bombing role.

A bombsight has to estimate the path the bomb will take after release from the aircraft. The two primary forces during its fall are gravity and air drag, which make the path of the bomb through the air roughly parabolic. There are additional factors such as changes in air density and wind that may be considered, but they are concerns only for bombs that spend a significant portion of a minute falling through the air. Those effects can be minimized by reducing the fall time by low-level bombing or by increasing the speed of the bombs. Those effects are combined in the dive bomber.

However, low-level bombing also increases the danger to the bomber from ground-based defences, so accurate bombing from higher altitudes has always been desired. That has led to a series of increasingly sophisticated bombsight designs dedicated to high-altitude level bombing.

Bombsights were first used before World War I and have since gone through several major revisions. The earliest systems were iron sights, which were pre-set to an estimated fall angle. In some cases, they consisted of nothing more than a series of nails hammered into a convenient spar, lines drawn on the aircraft, or visual alignments of certain parts of the structure. They were replaced by the earliest custom-designed systems, normally iron sights that could be set based on the aircraft's airspeed and altitude. These early systems were replaced by the vector bombsights, which added the ability to measure and adjust for winds. Vector bombsights were useful for altitudes up to about 3,000 m (10,000 ft) and speeds up to about 300 km/h (190 mph; 160 kn).

In the 1930s, mechanical computers with the performance needed to solve the equations of motion started to be incorporated into the new tachometric bombsights, the most famous of which is the Norden. Then, in World War II, tachometric bombsights were often combined with radar systems to allow accurate bombing through clouds or at night. When postwar studies demonstrated that bomb accuracy was roughly equal either optically or radar-guided, optical bombsights were generally removed and the role passed to dedicated radar bombsights. Finally, especially since the 1960s, fully computerized bombsights were introduced, which combined the bombing with long-range navigation and mapping.

Modern aircraft do not have a bombsight but use highly computerized systems called ballistic computers that combine bombing, gunnery, missile fire and navigation into a single head-up display. The systems have the performance to calculate the bomb trajectory in real time, as the aircraft manoeuvres, and add the ability to adjust for weather, relative altitude, relative speeds for moving targets and climb or dive angle. That makes them useful both for level bombing, as in earlier generations, and tactical missions, which used to bomb by eye.

== Theory ==
=== Forces on a bomb ===
The drag on a bomb for a given air density and angle of attack is proportional to the relative air speed squared. If the vertical component of the velocity is denoted by $v_v$ and the horizontal component by $v_h$ then the speed is $\sqrt{v_v^2+v_h^2}$ and the vertical and horizontal components of the drag are:

$$\begin{align}
d_v&=CA\rho\frac{v_v}{\sqrt{v_v^2+v_h^2}}(v_v^2+v_h^2) \\
& =CA\rho v_v\sqrt{v_v^2+v_h^2}
\end{align}$$
$$\begin{align}
d_h&=CA\rho\frac{v_h}{\sqrt{v_v^2+v_h^2}}(v_v^2+v_h^2) \\
& =CA\rho v_h\sqrt{v_v^2+v_h^2}
\end{align}$$

where C is the coefficient of drag, A is the cross-sectional area, and ρ is the air density. These equations show that horizontal velocity increases vertical drag and vertical velocity increases horizontal drag. These effects are ignored in the following discussion.

In only the vertical direction, the bomb will be subject to two primary forces, gravity and drag, the first constant, and the second varying with the square of velocity. For an aircraft flying straight and level, the initial vertical velocity of the bomb will be zero, which means it will also have zero vertical drag. Gravity will accelerate the bomb downwards, and as its velocity increases so does the drag force. At some point (as speed and air density increase), the force of drag will become equal to the force of gravity, and the bomb will reach terminal velocity. As the air drag varies with air density, and thus altitude, the terminal velocity will decrease as the bomb falls. Generally, the bomb will slow as it reaches lower altitudes where the air is denser, but the relationship is complex.

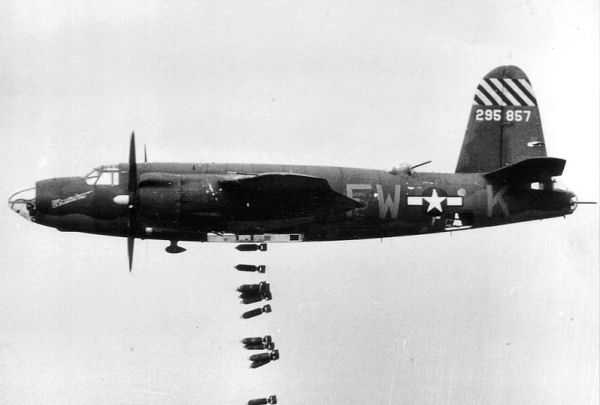
The way the line of bombs falling from this B-26 goes towards the rear is due to drag. The aircraft's engines keep it moving forward at a constant speed, while the bombs slow down. From the bomber's perspective, the bombs trail behind the aircraft.

More forces affect horizontal motion. At the instant it is released, the bomb carries the forward speed of the aircraft with it. This velocity is countered solely by drag, which starts to slow the forward motion. As the forward motion slows, the drag force drops and this deceleration diminishes. The forward speed is never reduced entirely to zero. If the bomb were not subject to drag, its path would be purely ballistic and it would impact at an easily calculable point, the vacuum range. In practice, drag means that the impact point is short of the vacuum range, and this real-world distance between dropping and impact is known simply as the range. The difference between the vacuum range and actual range is known as the trail because the bomb appears to trail behind the aircraft as it falls. The trail and range differ for different bombs due to their individual aerodynamics and typically have to be measured on a bombing range.

The main problem in completely separating the motion into vertical and horizontal components is the terminal velocity. Bombs are designed to fly with the nose pointed forward into the relative wind, normally through the use of fins at the back of the bomb. The drag depends on the angle of attack of the bomb at any given instant. If the bomb is released at low altitudes and speeds the bomb will not reach terminal velocity and its speed will be defined largely by how long the bomb has been falling.

The wind also acts on the bomb through drag and is thus a function of the wind speed. This is typically only a fraction of the speed of the bomber or the terminal velocity, so it only becomes a factor if the bomb is dropped from altitudes high enough for this small influence to noticeably affect the bomb's path. The difference between the impact point and where it would have fallen if there had been no wind is known as drift, or cross trail.

=== The bombsight problem ===
In ballistics terms, it is traditional to talk of the calculation of aiming of ordnance as the solution. The bombsight problem is the calculation of the location in space where the bombs should be dropped in order to hit the target when all of the effects noted above are taken into account.

In the absence of wind, the bombsight problem is fairly simple. The impact point is a function of three factors, the aircraft's altitude, its forward speed, and the terminal velocity of the bomb. In many early bombsights, the first two inputs were adjusted by separately setting the front and back sights of an iron sight, one for the altitude and the other for the speed. Terminal velocity, which extends the fall time, can be accounted for by raising the effective altitude by an amount that is based on the bomb's measured ballistics.

When windage is accounted for, the calculations become more complex. As the wind can operate in any direction, bombsights generally break the windage into the portions that act along the flight path and across it. In practice, it was generally simpler to have the aircraft fly in such a way to zero out any sideways motion before the drop, and thereby eliminate this factor. This is normally accomplished using a common flying techniques known as crabbing or sideslip.

Bombsights are sighting devices that are pointed in a particular direction, or aimed. Although the solution outlined above returns a point in space, simple trigonometry can be used to convert this point into an angle relative to the ground. The bombsight is then set to indicate that angle. The bombs are dropped when the target passes through the sights. The distance between the aircraft and target at that moment is the range, so this angle is often referred to as the range angle, although dropping angle, aiming angle, bombing angle and similar terms are often used as well. In practice, some or all of these calculations are carried out using angles and not points in space, skipping the final conversion.

=== Accuracy ===
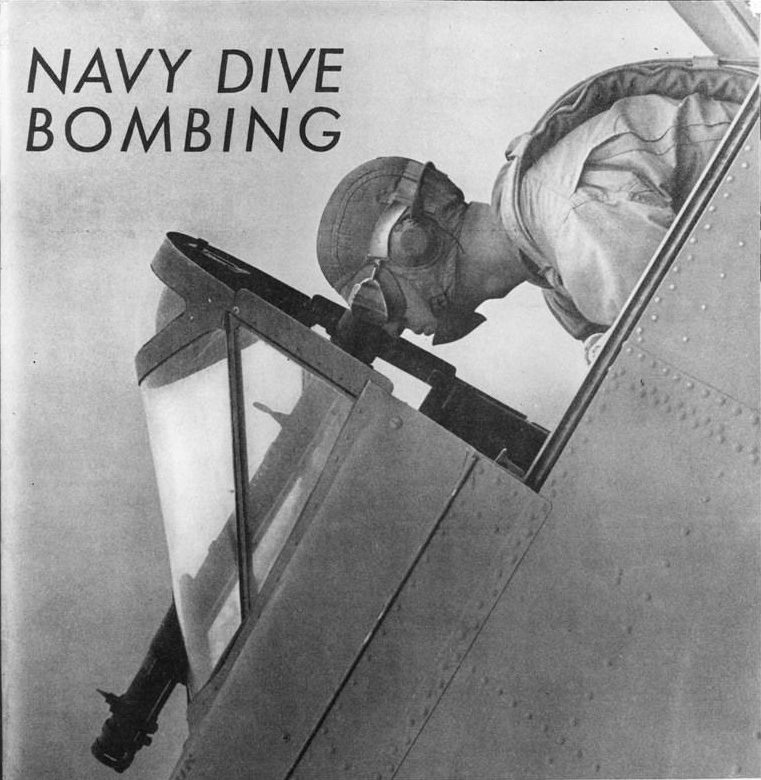
US Navy dive bomber pilot flying the airplane at an angle of about 75°.

The accuracy of the drop is affected both by inherent problems like the randomness of the atmosphere or bomb manufacture as well as more practical problems like how close to flat and level the aircraft is flying or the accuracy of its instruments. These inaccuracies compound over time, so increasing the altitude of the bomb run, thereby increasing the fall time, has a significant impact on the final accuracy of the drop.

For example, the AN-M64 230 kg (500 lb) General-Purpose Bomb, was widely used by the USAAF and RAF during World War II, with direct counterparts in the armouries of most forces involved. Ballistic data on this bomb is well known. Against men standing in the open, the bomb has a lethal radius of about 107 m (351 ft), but much less than that against buildings, about 27 m (89 ft).

The M64 will be dropped from a Boeing B-17 flying at 322 km/h (200 mph) at an altitude of 6,100 m (20,000 ft) in a 42 km/h (26 mph) wind. Given these conditions, the M64 would travel approximately 3,000 m (10,000 ft) forward from the drop point before impact, for a trail of about 300 m (1,000 ft) from the vacuum range, and impact with a velocity of 351 m/s (1,150 ft/s) at an angle of about 77° from horizontal. A 42 km/h (26 mph) wind would be expected to move the bomb about 90 m (300 ft) during that time. The time to fall is about 37 seconds.

Assuming errors of 5% in every major measurement, one can estimate those effects on accuracy based on the methodology and tables in the guide. A 5% error in altitude at 6,100 m (20,000 ft) would be 300 m (1,000 ft), so the aircraft might be anywhere from 5,800 to 6,400 m (19,000 to 21,000 ft). According to the table, this would result in an error around 3.0 to 4.6 m (10 to 15 ft). A 5% error in airspeed, 16 km/h (10 mph), would cause an error of about 4.6 to 6.1 m (15 to 20 ft). In terms of drop timing, errors on the order of 0.1 seconds might be considered the best possible. In this case, the error is simply the ground speed of the aircraft over this time, or about 9 m (30 ft). All of these are well within the lethal radius of the bomb.

The wind affects the accuracy of the bomb in two ways, pushing directly on the bomb while it falls, as well as changing the ground speed of the aircraft before the drop. In the case of the direct effects on the bomb, a measurement that has a 5% error, 2.0 km/h (1.25 mph), that would cause a 5% error in the drift, which would be 5.3 m (17.5 ft). However, that 2.0 kph error, would also be added to the aircraft's velocity. Over the time of the fall, 37 seconds, that would result in an error of 21 m (68 ft), which is at the outside limit of the bomb's performance.

The measurement of the wind speed is a more serious concern. Early navigation systems generally measured it using a dead reckoning procedure that compares measured movement over the ground with the calculated movement using the aircraft instruments. The Federal Aviation Administration's FAR Part 63 suggests 5 to 10% accuracy of these calculations, the US Air Force's AFM 51-40 gives 10%, and the US Navy's H.O. 216 at a fixed 32 km/h (20 mph) or greater. Compounding this inaccuracy is that it is made using the instrument's airspeed indication, and as the airspeed in this example is about 10 times that of the wind speed, its 5% error can lead to great inaccuracies in wind speed calculations. Eliminating this error through the direct measurement of ground speed (instead of calculating it) was a major advance in the tachometric bombsights of the 1930s and 40s.

Errors of the same 5% also occur in the equipment itself, that is, an error of 5% in the setting of the range angle, or a similar 5% error in the levelling of the aircraft or bombsight. For simplicity, consider that 5% to be a 5° angle. Using simple trigonometry, 5° at 6,100 m (20,000 ft) is approximately 530 m (1,750 ft), an error that would place the bombs far outside their lethal radius. In tests, accuracies of 3° to 4° were considered standard, and angles as high as 15° were not uncommon. Given the seriousness of the problem, systems for automatic levelling of bombsights was a major area of study before World War II, especially in the US.

== Early systems ==
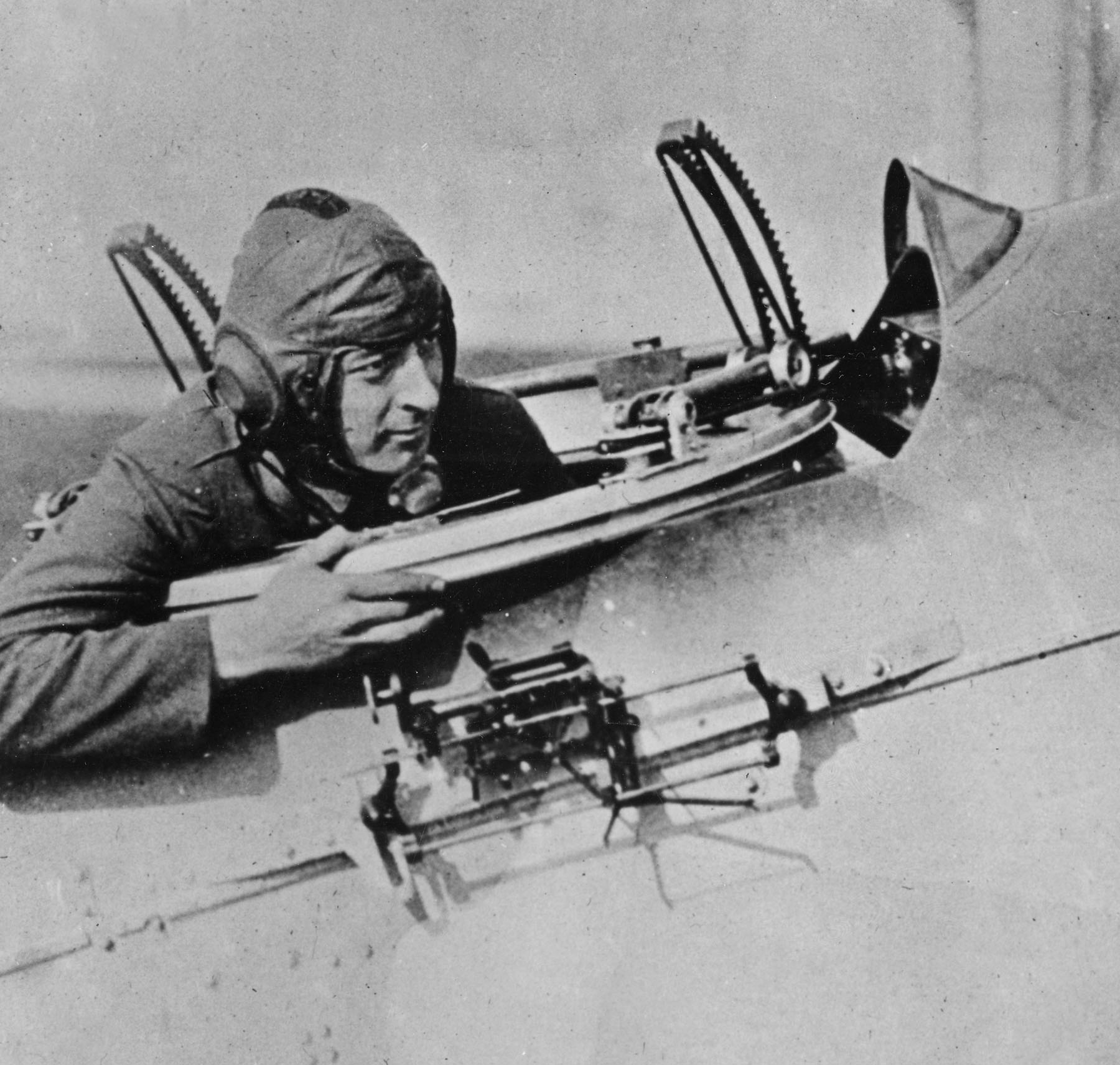
A Mk. I Drift Sight mounted on the side of an Airco DH.4. The lever just in front of the bomb aimer's fingertips sets the altitude, the wheels near his knuckles set the wind and airspeed.

All of the calculations needed to predict the path of a bomb can be carried out by hand, with the aid of calculated tables of the bomb ballistics. However, the time to carry out these calculations is not trivial. Using visual sighting, the range at which the target is first sighted remains fixed, based on eyesight. As aircraft speeds increase, there is less time available after the initial spotting to carry out the calculations and correct the aircraft's flight path to bring it over the proper drop point. During the early stages of bombsight development, the problem was addressed by reducing the allowable engagement envelope, thereby reducing the need to calculate marginal effects. For instance, when dropped from very low altitudes, the effects of drag and wind during the fall will be so small that they can be ignored. In this case only the forward speed and altitude have any measurable effect.

One of the earliest recorded examples of such a bombsight was built in 1911 by Lieutenant Riley E. Scott, of the US Army Coast Artillery Corps. This was a simple device with inputs for airspeed and altitude which was hand-held while lying prone on the wing of the aircraft. After considerable testing, he was able to build a table of settings to use with these inputs. In testing at College Park, Maryland, Scott was able to place two 8 kg (18 lb) bombs within 3 m (10 ft) of a 1.2 by 1.5 m (4 by 5 ft) target from a height of 120 m (400 ft). In January 1912, Scott won $5,000 for first place in the Michelin bombing competition at Villacoublay Airfield in France, scoring 12 hits on a 38 by 114 m (125 by 375 ft) target with 15 bombs dropped from 800 m (2,600 ft).

In spite of early examples like Scott's prior to the war, during the opening stages of the First World War bombing was almost always carried out by eye, dropping the small bombs by hand when the conditions looked right. As the use and roles for aircraft increased during the war, the need for better accuracy became pressing. At first this was accomplished by sighting off parts of the aircraft, such as struts and engine cylinders, or drawing lines on the side of the aircraft after test drops on a bombing range. These were useful for low altitudes and stationary targets, but as the nature of the air war expanded, the needs quickly outgrew these solutions as well.

For higher altitude drops, the effect of wind and bomb trajectory could no longer be ignored. One important simplification was to ignore the terminal velocity of the bomb, and calculate its average speed as the square root of the altitude measured in feet. For instance, a bomb dropped from 3,000 m (10,000 ft) would fall at an average rate of 120 m/s (400 ft/s), allowing easy calculation of the time to fall. Now all that remained was a measurement of the wind speed, or more generally the ground speed. Normally this was accomplished by flying the aircraft into the general direction of the wind and then observing motion of objects on the ground and adjusting the flight path side to side until any remaining sideways drift due to wind was eliminated. The speed over the ground was then measured by timing the motion of objects between two given angles as seen through the sight.

One of the most fully developed examples of such a sight to see combat was the German Görtz bombsight, developed for the Gotha heavy bombers. The Görtz used a telescope with a rotating prism at the bottom that allowed the sight to be rotated fore and aft. After zeroing out sideways motion the sight was set to a pre-set angle and then an object was timed with a stopwatch until it was directly below the aircraft. This revealed the ground speed, which was multiplied by the time taken to hit the ground, and then a pointer in the sight was set to an angle looked up on a table. The bomb aimer then watched the target in the sight until it crossed the pointer, and dropped the bombs. Similar bombsights were developed in France and England, notably the Michelin and Central Flying School Number Seven bombsight. While useful, these sights required a time-consuming setup period while the movement was timed.

A great upgrade to the basic concept was introduced by Harry Wimperis, better known for his later role in the development of radar in England. In 1916 he introduced the Drift Sight, which added a simple system for directly measuring the wind speed. The bomb aimer would first dial in the altitude and airspeed of the aircraft. Doing so rotated a metal bar on the right side of the bombsight so it pointed out from the fuselage. Prior to the bomb run, the bomber would fly at right angles to the bomb line, and the bomb aimer would look past the rod to watch the motion of objects on the ground. He would then adjust the wind speed setting until the motion was directly along the rod. This action measured the wind speed, and moved the sights to the proper angle to account for it, eliminating the need for separate calculations. A later modification was added to calculate the difference between true and indicated airspeed, which grows with altitude. This version was the Drift Sight Mk. 1A, introduced on the Handley Page O/400 heavy bomber. Variations on the design were common, like the US Estoppey bombsight.

All of these bombsights shared the problem that they were unable to deal with wind in any direction other than along the path of travel. That made them effectively useless against moving targets, like submarines and ships. Unless the target just happened to be travelling directly in line with the wind, their motion would carry the bomber away from the wind line as they approached. Additionally, as anti-aircraft artillery grew more effective, they would often pre-sight their guns along the wind line of the targets they were protecting, knowing that attacks would come from those directions. A solution for attacking cross-wind was sorely needed.

== Vector bombsights ==
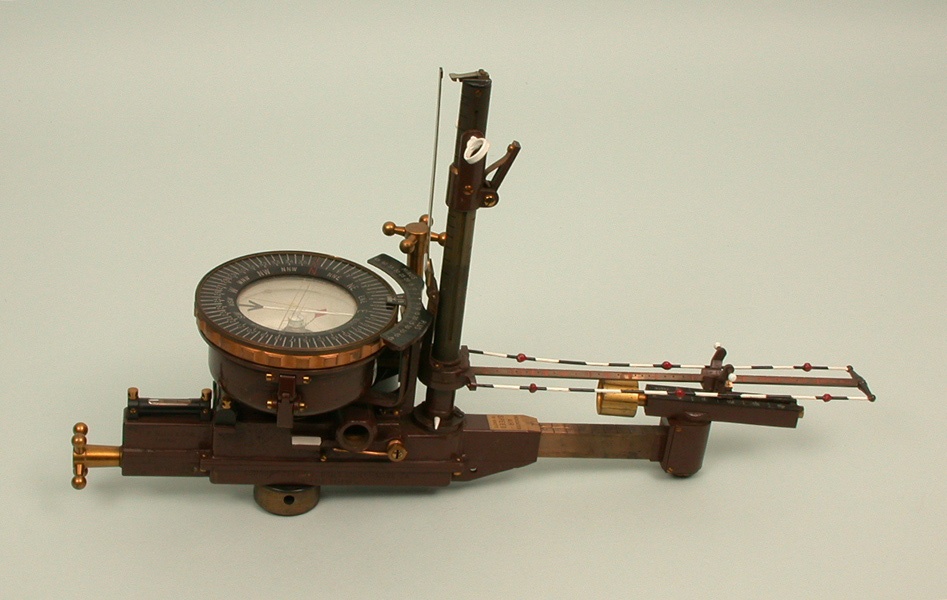
The CSBS Mk. IA, the first widely produced vector bombsight. The drift wires are visible on the right, the windage calculator on the left, and the altitude scale in the middle (vertical). The actual sights are the white rings near the top of the altitude slider and white dots mid-way along the drift wires. The drift wires are normally taut, this example is almost a century old.

Calculating the effects of an arbitrary wind on the path of an aircraft was already a well-understood problem in air navigation, one requiring basic vector mathematics. Wimperis was very familiar with these techniques, and would go on to write a seminal introductory text on the topic. The same calculations would work just as well for bomb trajectories, with some minor adjustments to account for the changing velocities as the bombs fell. Even as the Drift Sight was being introduced, Wimperis was working on a new bombsight that helped solve these calculations and allow the effects of wind to be considered no matter the direction of the wind or the bomb run.

The result was the Course Setting Bomb Sight (CSBS), called "the most important bomb sight of the war". Dialling in the values for altitude, airspeed and the speed and direction of the wind rotated and slid various mechanical devices that solved the vector problem. Once set up, the bomb aimer would watch objects on the ground and compare their path to thin wires on either side of the sight. If there was any sideways motion, the pilot could slip-turn to a new heading in an effort to cancel out the drift. A few attempts were typically all that was needed, at which point the aircraft was flying in the right direction to take it directly over the drop point, with zero sideways velocity. The bomb aimer (or pilot in some aircraft) then sighted through the attached iron sights to time the drop.

The CSBS was introduced into service in 1917 and quickly replaced earlier sights on aircraft that had enough room – the CSBS was fairly large. Versions for different speeds, altitudes and bomb types were introduced as the war progressed. After the war, the CSBS continued to be the main bombsight in British use. Thousands were sold to foreign air forces and numerous versions were created for production around the world. A number of experimental devices based on a variation of the CSBS were also developed, notably the US's Estoppey D-1 sight, developed shortly after the war, and similar versions from many other nations. These "vector bombsights" all shared the basic vector calculator system and drift wires, differing primarily in form and optics.

As bombers grew and multi-place aircraft became common, it was no longer possible for the pilot and bombardier to share the same instrument, and hand signals were no longer visible if the bombardier was below the pilot in the nose. A variety of solutions using dual optics or similar systems were suggested in the post-war era, but none of these became widely used. This led to the introduction of the pilot direction indicator, an electrically driven pointer which the bomb aimer used to indicate corrections from a remote location in the aircraft.

Vector bombsights remained the standard by most forces well into the Second World War, and was the main sight in British service until 1942. This was in spite of the introduction of newer sighting systems with great advantages over the CSBS, and even newer versions of the CSBS that failed to be used for a variety of reasons. The later versions of the CSBS, eventually reaching the Mark X, included adjustments for different bombs, ways to attack moving targets, systems for more easily measuring winds, and a host of other options.

== Tachometric bombsights ==
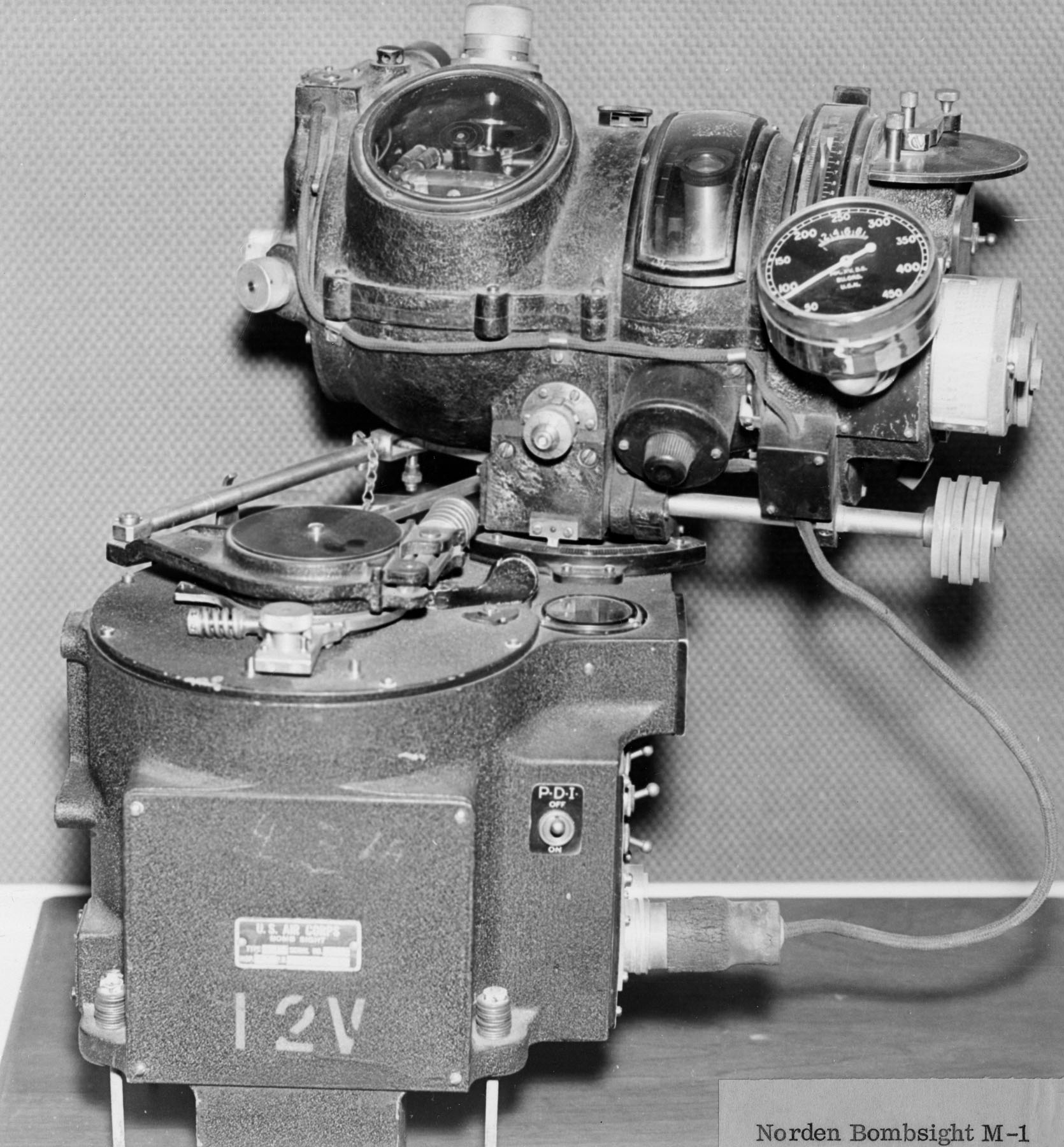
The Norden M-1 is the canonical tachometric bombsight. The bombsight proper is at the top of the image, mounted on top of the autopilot system at the bottom. The bombsight is slightly rotated to the right; in action the autopilot would turn the aircraft to reduce this angle back to zero.

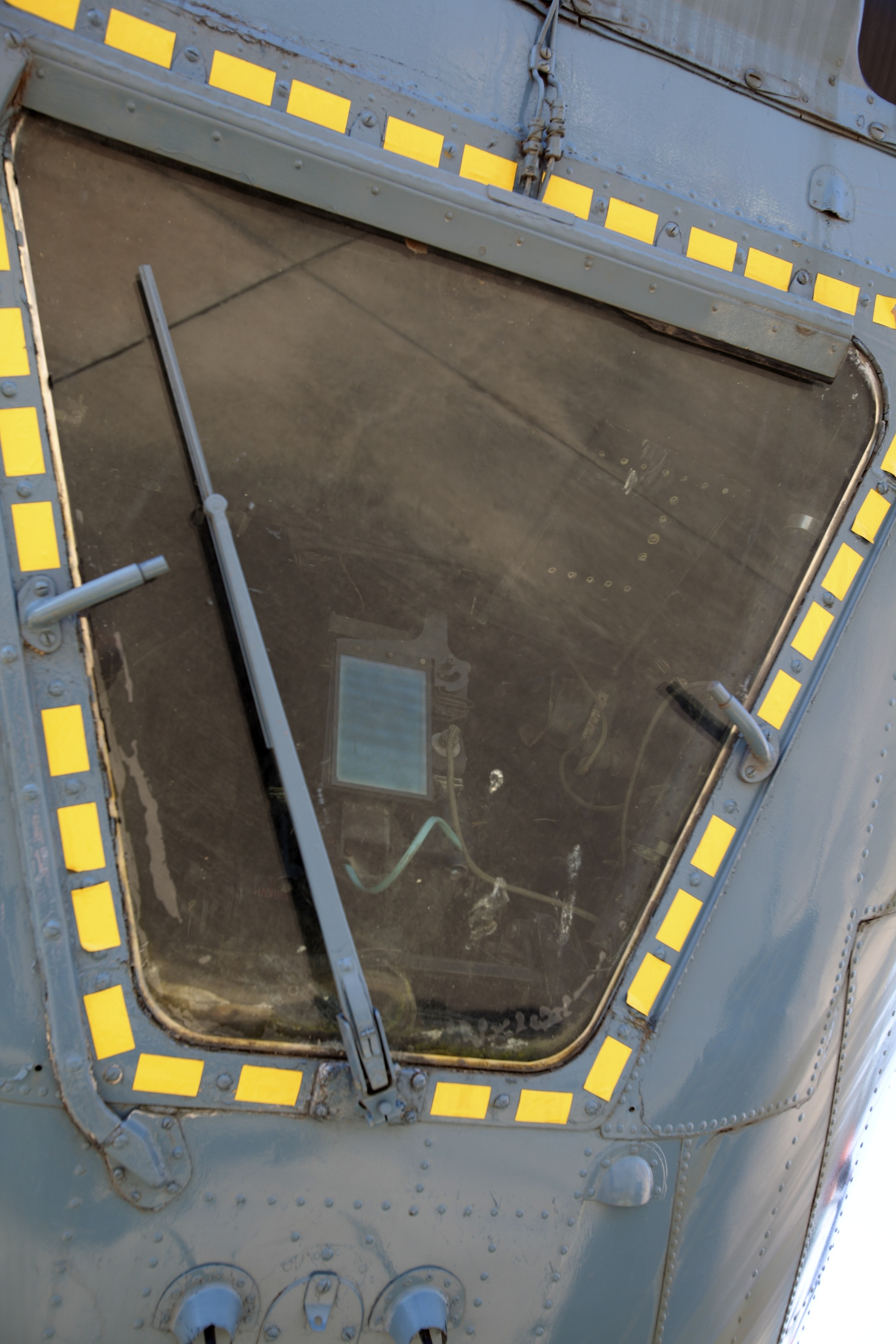
Bomb aimer's window and Low Level Bombsight, Mark III in the nose of an Avro Shackleton.

The limitations of vector bombsights (which required a long straight run before dropping the bombs to accommodate windage) led to the development of bombsights based on the field of tacheometry. Unlike a vector bombsight, which merely offered a bombardier a launch point for a desired bomb trajectory, tachometric bombsights tracked the bomb target and recalculated the release point based on input that included horizontal deviations induced by minor aircraft maneuvering or wind drift. In their most advanced form the incorporated sophisticated optics, data derived directly from the aircraft's flight instruments, compact mechanical computers, and autopilot to guide the aircraft to a its target and automatically release its bombs.

Once the operator of a Norden M-1, the most famous of all tachometric bombsights, was able to identify a target the bombsight was able, in perfect conditions, to fly the plane to it. In battle, complicated by anti-aircraft defenses, crosswinds and clouds, and the need for aircraft to stay in formation to avoid collisions, results were less ideal but as good as could be achieved with the technology under the circumstances.

Two real-world considerations accelerated the development of tachometric bombsights: the introduction of monoplane bombers made manual adjustments to keep a plane on target more difficult. Large monoplanes suffered from an effect known as "Dutch roll", and were not able to slip-turn to correct for it as easily as their biplane predecessors. Also, intense ground-based anti-aircraft defenses and improved interceptors made it impossible to sustain long straight-and-level bombing runs without excessive loss of aircraft and their valuable crews.

If anything changed the aircraft's path during the bomb run, whether due to difficulty turning and a tendency to oscillate after levelling induced by the Dutch roll or evasive maneuvers forced by the enemy, bomb trajectory calculations had to be set up again. There simply was not time to do so with the bombsights and mechanical computers of the day.

One solution was to stabilize the bombsight independent of the aircraft. The use of a gimbal system to keep the bombsight pointed roughly downward during maneuvering or compensating for windage had been pursued for some time. Experiments as early as the 1920s had demonstrated that this could roughly double the accuracy of bombing. The US carried out an active program in this area, including Estoppey sights mounted to weighted gimbals and Sperry Gyroscope's experiments with US versions of the CSBS mounted to a gyroscopically-stabilized inertial platform. These same developments led to the introduction of the first useful autopilots, which could be used to directly dial in the required path and have the aircraft fly to that heading with no further input. A variety of bombing systems using one or both of these systems were considered throughout the 1920s and 30s.

During the same period, a separate line of development was leading to the first reliable mechanical computers. These could be used to replace a complex table of numbers with a carefully shaped cam-like device, and the manual calculation though a series of gears or slip wheels. Originally limited to fairly simple calculations consisting of additions and subtractions, by the 1930s they had progressed to the point where they were being used to solve differential equations. For bombsight use, such a calculator would allow the bomb aimer to dial in the basic aircraft parameters – speed, altitude, direction, and known atmospheric conditions – and the bomb sight would use tacheometrically based trigonometry to automatically calculate the proper aim point in a few moments. Some of the traditional inputs, like airspeed and altitude, could even be taken directly from the aircraft instruments, eliminating operational errors, and allowing constant recalculation of essential target-tracking and bomb release parameters.

Although these developments were well known within the industry, only the US Army Air Corps and US Navy put any concerted effort into development. During the 1920s, the Navy funded development of the Norden bombsight while the Army funded development of the Sperry O-1. Both systems were generally similar; a bomb sight consisting of a small telescope was mounted on a stabilizing platform to keep the sighting head stable. A separate mechanical computer was used to calculate the aim point. The aim point was fed back to the sight, which automatically rotated the telescope to the correct angle to account for drift and aircraft movement, keeping the target still in the view. When the bombardier sighted through the telescope, he could see any residual drift and relay this to the pilot, or later, feed that information directly into the autopilot. Simply moving the telescope to keep the target in view had the side effect of fine-tuning the windage calculations continuously, and thereby greatly increasing their accuracy. For a variety of reasons, the Army dropped their interest in the Sperry, and features from the Sperry and Norden bombsights were folded into new models of the Norden. The Norden then equipped almost all US high-level bombers, most notably the B-17 Flying Fortress. In tests, these bombsights were able to generate fantastic accuracy. In practice, however, operational factors seriously upset them, to the point that pinpoint bombing using the Norden was eventually abandoned.

Although the US put the most effort into development of the tachometric concept, they were also being studied elsewhere. In the UK, work on the Automatic Bomb Sight (ABS) had been carried on since the mid-1930s in an effort to replace the CSBS. However, the ABS did not include stabilization of the sighting system, nor the Norden's autopilot system. In testing the ABS proved to be too difficult to use, requiring long bomb runs to allow the computer time to solve the aim point. When RAF Bomber Command complained that even the CSBS had too long a run-in to the target, efforts to deploy the ABS ended. For their needs they developed a new vector bombsight, the Mk. XIV. The Mk. XIV featured a stabilizing platform and aiming computer, but worked more like the CSBS in overall functionality – the bomb aimer would set the computer to move the sighting system to the proper angle, but the bombsight did not track the target or attempt to correct the aircraft path. The advantage of this system was that it was dramatically faster to use, and could be used even while the aircraft was manoeuvring, only a few seconds of straight-line flying were needed before the drop. Facing a lack of production capability, Sperry was contracted to produce the Mk. XIV in the US, calling it the Sperry T-1.

Both the British and Germans would later introduce Norden-like sights of their own. Based at least partially on information about the Norden passed to them through the Duquesne Spy Ring, the Luftwaffe developed the Lotfernrohr 7. The basic mechanism was almost identical to the Norden, but much smaller. In certain applications the Lotfernrohr 7 could be used by a single-crew aircraft, as was the case for the Arado Ar 234, the world's first operational jet bomber. During the war the RAF had the need for accurate high-altitude bombing and in 1943 introduced a stabilized version of the earlier ABS, the hand-built Stabilized Automatic Bomb Sight (SABS). It was produced in such limited numbers that it was at first used only by the famed No. 617 Squadron RAF, The Dambusters.

== Radar bombing and integrated systems ==
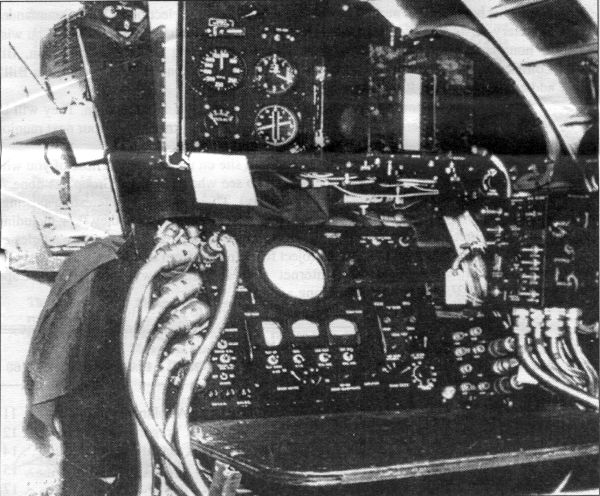
The AN/APS-15 radar bombing system, a US version of the British H2S.

In the pre-World War II era there had been a long debate about the relative merits of daylight versus night-time bombing. At night the bomber is virtually invulnerable (until the introduction of radar) but finding its target was a major problem. In practice, only large targets such as cities could be attacked. During the day the bomber could use its bombsights to attack point targets, but only at the risk of being attacked by enemy fighters and anti-aircraft artillery.

During the early 1930s the debate had been won by the night-bombing supporters, and the RAF and Luftwaffe started construction of large fleets of aircraft dedicated to the night mission. As "the bomber will always get through", these forces were strategic in nature, largely a deterrent to the other force's own bombers. However, new engines introduced in the mid-1930s led to much larger bombers that were able to carry greatly improved defensive suites, while their higher operational altitudes and speeds would render them less vulnerable to the defences on the ground. Policy once again changed in favour of daylight attacks against military targets and factories, abandoning what was considered a cowardly and defeatist night-bombing policy.

In spite of this change, the Luftwaffe continued to put some effort into solving the problem of accurate navigation at night. This led to the Battle of the Beams during the opening stages of the war. The RAF returned in force in early 1942 with similar systems of their own, and from that point on, radio navigation systems of increasing accuracy allowed bombing in any weather or operational conditions. The Oboe system, first used operationally in early 1943, offered real-world accuracies on the order of 32 m (105 ft), much better than any optical bombsight. The introduction of the British H2S radar further improved the bomber's abilities, allowing direct attack of targets without the need of remote radio transmitters, which had range limited to the line-of-sight. By 1943 these techniques were in widespread use by both the RAF and USAAF, leading to the H2X and then a series of improved versions like the AN/APQ-13 and AN/APQ-7 used on the Boeing B-29 Superfortress.

These early systems operated independently of any existing optical bombsight, but this presented the problem of having to separately calculate the trajectory of the bomb. In the case of Oboe, these calculations were carried out before the mission at the ground bases. But as daylight visual bombing was still widely used, conversions and adaptations were quickly made to repeat the radar signal in the existing bombsights, allowing the bombsight calculator to solve the radar bombing problem. For instance, the AN/APA-47 was used to combine the output from the AN/APQ-7 with the Norden, allowing the bomb aimer to easily check both images to compare the aim point.

Analysis of the results of bombing attacks carried out using radio navigation or radar techniques demonstrated accuracy was essentially equal for the two systems – night time attacks with Oboe were able to hit targets that the Norden could not during the day. With the exception of operational considerations – limited resolution of the radar and limited range of the navigation systems – the need for visual bombsights quickly disappeared. Designs of the late-war era, like the Boeing B-47 Stratojet and English Electric Canberra retained their optical systems, but these were often considered secondary to the radar and radio systems. In the case of the Canberra, the optical system only existed due to delays in the radar system becoming available.

== Postwar developments ==
The strategic bombing role was following an evolution over time to ever-higher, ever-faster, ever-longer-ranged missions with ever-more-powerful weapons. Although the tachometric bombsights provided most of the features needed for accurate bombing, they were complex, slow, and limited to straight-line and level attacks. In 1946 the US Army Air Force asked the Army Air Forces Scientific Advisory Group to study the problem of bombing from jet aircraft that would soon be entering service. They concluded that at speeds over 1,900 kilometres per hour (1,200 mph), optical systems would be useless – the visual range to the target would be less than the range of a bomb being dropped at high altitudes and speeds.

At the attack ranges being considered, thousands of kilometres, radio navigation systems would not be able to offer both the range and the accuracy needed. This demanded radar bombing systems, but existing examples did not offer anywhere near the required performance. At the stratospheric altitudes and long "sighting" ranges being considered, the radar antenna would need to be very large to offer the required resolution, yet this ran counter for the need to develop an antenna that was as small as possible in order to reduce drag. They also pointed out that many targets would not show up directly on the radar, so the bombsight would need the ability to drop at points relative to some landmark that did appear, the so-called "offset aiming points". Finally, the group noted that many of the functions in such a system would overlap formerly separate tools like the navigation systems. They proposed a single system that would offer mapping, navigation, autopilot and bomb aiming, thereby reducing complexity, and especially the needed space. Such a machine first emerged in the form of the AN/APQ-24, and later the "K-System", the AN/APA-59.

Through the 1950s and 1960s, radar bombing of this sort was common and the accuracy of the systems were limited to what was needed to support attacks by nuclear weapons – a circular error probable (CEP) of about 900 metres (3,000 ft) was considered adequate. As mission range extended to thousands of kilometres, bombers started incorporating inertial guidance and star trackers to allow accurate navigation when far from land. These systems quickly improved in accuracy, and eventually became accurate enough to handle the bomb dropping without the need for a separate bombsight. This was the case for the 460 m (1,500 ft) accuracy demanded of the B-70 Valkyrie, which lacked any sort of conventional bombsight.

== Modern systems ==
During the Cold War the weapon of choice was a nuclear one, and accuracy needs were limited. Development of tactical bombing systems, notably the ability to attack point targets with conventional weapons that had been the original goal of the Norden, was not considered seriously. Thus when the US entered the Vietnam War, their weapon of choice was the Douglas A-26 Invader equipped with the Norden. Such a solution was inadequate.

At the same time, the ever-increasing power levels of new jet engines led to fighter aircraft with bomb loads similar to heavy bombers of a generation earlier. This generated demand for a new generation of greatly improved bombsights that could be used by a single-crew aircraft and employed in fighter-like tactics, whether high-level, low-level, in a dive towards the target, or during hard maneuvering. A specialist capability for toss bombing also developed in order to allow aircraft to escape the blast radius of their own nuclear weapons, something that required only middling accuracy but a very different trajectory that initially required a dedicated bombsight.

As electronics improved, these systems were able to be combined, and then eventually with systems for aiming other weapons. They may be controlled by the pilot directly and provide information through the head-up display or a video display on the instrument panel. The definition of bombsight is becoming blurred as "smart" bombs with in-flight guidance, such as laser-guided bombs or those using GPS, replace "dumb" gravity bombs.

== See also ==
- Norden bombsight (USAAF)
- Stabilized Automatic Bomb Sight (RAF)
- Mark XIV bomb sight (RAF) less accurate, for area bombing
- Lotfernrohr 7 (Luftwaffe)
- SVP-24

=== Similar devices ===
- Reflex sight
- Aircraft periscope

== Bibliography ==
- Terminal Ballistic Data, Volume I: Bombing (Technical report). US Army Office of the Chief of Ordnance. August 1944.
- Terminal Ballistic Data, Volume III: Effects (Technical report). US Army Office of the Chief of Ordnance. 1944. Archived from the original on 7 August 2010.
- United States Naval Academy, Department of Ordnance and Gunnery (1958). "Chapter 23: Aircraft Fire Control". Naval Ordnance and Gunnery. Vol. 2. U.S. Government Printing Office.
- Perry, Robert (1961). Development of Airborne Armament 1910 - 1961. Vol. 1 - Bombing Systems.
- Raymond, Allan (December 1943). "How Our Bombsight Solves Problems". Popular Science. Bonnier Corporation: 116–119, 212, 214.
- Volta Torrey, "How the Norden Bombsight Does Its Job", Popular Science, June 1945, pp. 70–73, 220, 224, 228, 232
- Goulter, Christina J. M. (1995). A Forgotten Offensive: Royal Air Force Coastal Command's Anti-shipping Campaign, 1940-1945. Routledge. ISBN 978-0-7146-4617-6.
- Searle, L. (September 1989). "The bombsight war: Norden vs. Sperry" (PDF). IEEE Spectrum. 26 (9): 60–64. Bibcode:1989IEEES..26i..60S. doi:10.1109/6.90187. S2CID 22392603. Archived from the original (PDF) on 30 September 2011.
