= Harry Wimperis =

Harry Wimperis CB CBE MIEE FRAeS AMICEWh.Sch
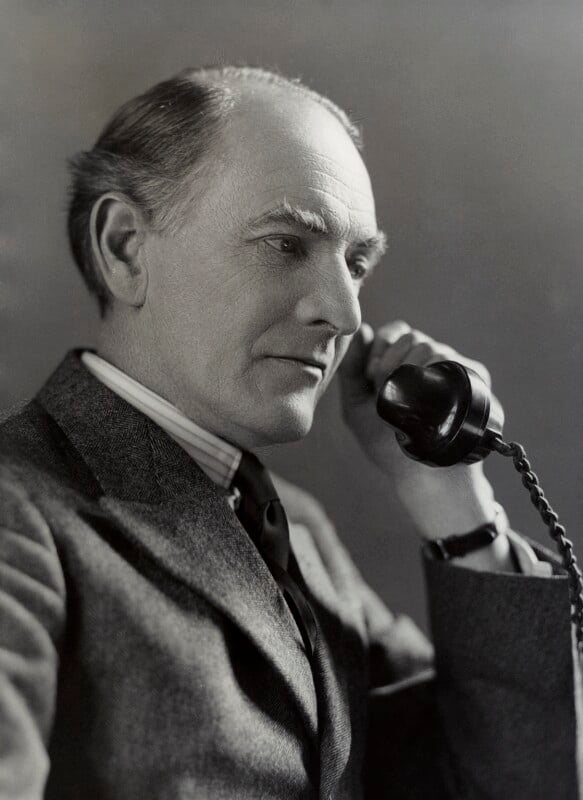
- Wimperis in 1936
- Born: 27 August 1876; Edmonton, Middlesex, England
- Died: 16 July 1960 (aged 83); Edinburgh, Scotland

Harry Egerton Wimperis CB CBE MIEE FRAeS AMICE Wh.Sch (27 August 1876 – 16 July 1960) was a British aeronautical engineer who acted as the Director of Scientific Research at the UK's Air Ministry prior to World War II. He is best known for his role in setting up the Committee for the Scientific Survey of Air Defence under Henry Tizard, which led directly to the development and introduction of radar in the UK. He is also known for the development of the Drift Sight and Course Setting Bomb Sight during World War I, devices that revolutionised the art of bombing.

== Biography ==
Wimperis was born on 27 August 1876 to Joseph Price Wimperis, an Australian merchant, and Jemima Samuel in Edmonton, London. He started his studies at Royal College of Science (part of Imperial College) and then moved to Gonville and Caius College, Cambridge as an advanced student in 1898. During this period he became a Whitworth Scholar, wrote a series of engineering books covering internal combustion, road transport and air navigation.

Among his many inventions and works are the Wimperis accelerometer of 1909, the first accelerometer rugged enough for use measuring the performance of automobiles. He was directed to Elliott Brothers for manufacture, and this started a long relationship between Wimperis and the company. The same year they introduced a gyroscopic turn indicator, and followed this with an optical speedometer, rate of roll indicator, indicated airspeed calculator and his famed bombsights.

Wimperis was commissioned as a lieutenant in the Royal Naval Volunteer Reserve on 7 September 1915. Starting in 1915 Wimperis worked in the Experimental Office in the Royal Navy Air Service (RNAS). Here he was put on the problem of devising a useful bombsight that did not require manual calculations or a stopwatch to estimate the wind speed. The result was his Drift Sight, which used a small bar that was aligned with the motion of objects on the ground to measure the wind. He then greatly expanded on this design in his Course Setting Bomb Sight (CSBS) in 1917, introducing the first system to allow bomb runs from any direction, instead of just up or down the wind line. The CSBS has been called "the most important bombsight of the war".

Wimperis remained with air service as it merged into the Royal Air Force in 1918, and the Air Ministry as it took over most of the centralised research for both arms. He was appointed Director of Scientific Research in the Air Ministry in 1925. In June 1934, Albert Percival Rowe, Wimperis' personal assistant, became concerned about the state of air defence in the UK, and took it upon himself to read every study on the topic published in the UK. The result was a memo stating that "we were likely to lose the war if it starts within the next ten years". Wimperis took the memo seriously and set about creating the Committee for the Scientific Study of Air Defence, placing Henry Tizard in the chairman's position. This group was instrumental in the creation of radar in the UK, and the Chain Home system that was instrumental to winning the Battle of Britain.

In 1938 Wimperis served as the aeronautical advisor to the Council for Scientific and Industrial Research of the Commonwealth of Australia, advising them on setting up their own aeronautical research division. He served as president of the Royal Aeronautical Society, 1936–1938, and of the Engineering Section of the British Association, 1939. In 1945, Wimperis was president of the Whitworth Society 47 years after becoming a scholar. From 1946 to 1950 he was a member of the Atomic Energy Study Group, Chatham House.

His wife, Grace d'Avray Parkin, was the daughter of Canadian George Robert Parkin. They married on 28 September 1907 and had three daughters.

Wimperis died in Edinburgh on 16 July 1960 at the age of 83.

== Honours ==
He was appointed an Officer of the Order of the British Empire in the 1918 New Year Honours for his efforts during the First World War, and a Commander of the Order in the 1928 Birthday Honours. He was appointed a Companion of the Order of the Bath in the 1935 Birthday Honours.

Professional and academic associations
Preceded by John Moore-Brabazon	President of the Royal Aeronautical Society; 1936–38	Succeeded by Roy Fedden
