= Course Setting Bomb Sight =

Vector bombsight

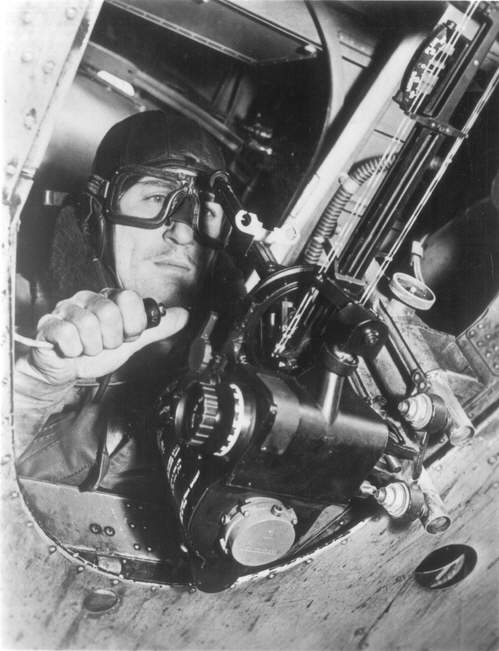
The CSBS Mk. IX mounted in a Fairey Battle. The bomb aimer is sighting through the white ring-shaped backsights to the pin shaped foresights (just visible against the armoured cable) and holding the bomb release switch in his right hand.

The Course Setting Bomb Sight (CSBS) is the canonical vector bombsight, the first practical system for properly accounting for the effects of wind when dropping bombs. It is also widely referred to as the Wimperis sight after its inventor, Harry Wimperis. The CSBS was developed for the Royal Naval Air Service (RNAS) in order to attack submarines and ships. It was introduced in 1917, and was such a great advance over earlier designs that it was quickly adopted by the Royal Flying Corps, and the Independent Air Force. It has been called "the most important bomb sight of the war".

The design found widespread use around the world after the war. A US version, the Mark III, was used by Billy Mitchell on his famous attack on the Ostfriesland in 1921. Similar designs were adopted by almost all air forces and used well into World War II. It was eventually replaced in British service by more advanced designs like the Mark XIV bomb sight and the Stabilized Automatic Bomb Sight. The US and Germany introduced advanced designs as well. Most other forces continued using vector bombsights throughout the war.

== History ==
=== Early bombsights ===
Prior to the introduction of the CSBS, bombsights were generally very simple systems of limited accuracy suitable only for low-level use. The primary pre-war device in RNAS service was the Lever Sight, which the pilot had to hold out of the cockpit in one hand while flying the aircraft with the other. The Central Flying School Sight replaced this in 1915, but was difficult to install in the cockpit. The CFS was in turn replaced by the Equal Distance Sight (EDS) designed in 1916 by F. W. Scarff, better known for the development of the Scarff ring. The EDS allowed the bomb-run parameters to be entered once and then left the pilot free to fly the plane.

None of these sights had a way to calculate drift, the sideways motion of the bombs due to wind. This meant the aircraft had to attack their targets directly along the wind line. Even in this direction, the wind would cause the bombs to fall long or short. To correct for this, the bomb aimer would first measure their speed over the ground using a stopwatch. They would next look up the time it would take the bombs to reach the ground from their current altitude using a pre-computed table. Then, using both values, they would look up the proper angle for the sights, the so-called range angle, and set the sights to that angle. This solution was far from practical, and prone to error.

In 1916, Harry Wimperis started the design of a new bombsight, working in collaboration with Scarff. This new Drift Sight included a simple system that greatly eased the measurement of the wind. By observing their movement over the ground, the aircraft would first determine the direction of the wind. The aircraft would then turn to fly at right angles to this wind direction so that the wind was pushing the aircraft sideways. Observing the sideways drift of the aircraft by comparing the motion of objects on the ground to a metal rod along the side of the bombsight, the drift could be seen. Using a knob, the rod was angled away from the side of the aircraft until objects could be seen moving directly along the line of the rod. A gear in the knob that adjusted the rod angle also drove the sights fore or aft, moving them to account for the wind speed. This eliminated the need for a stopwatch to measure the ground speed. This technique automated the adjustment of the range angle to account for wind, but the Drift Sight was still useful only for bomb runs along the wind line.

=== Course Setting Bomb Sight ===
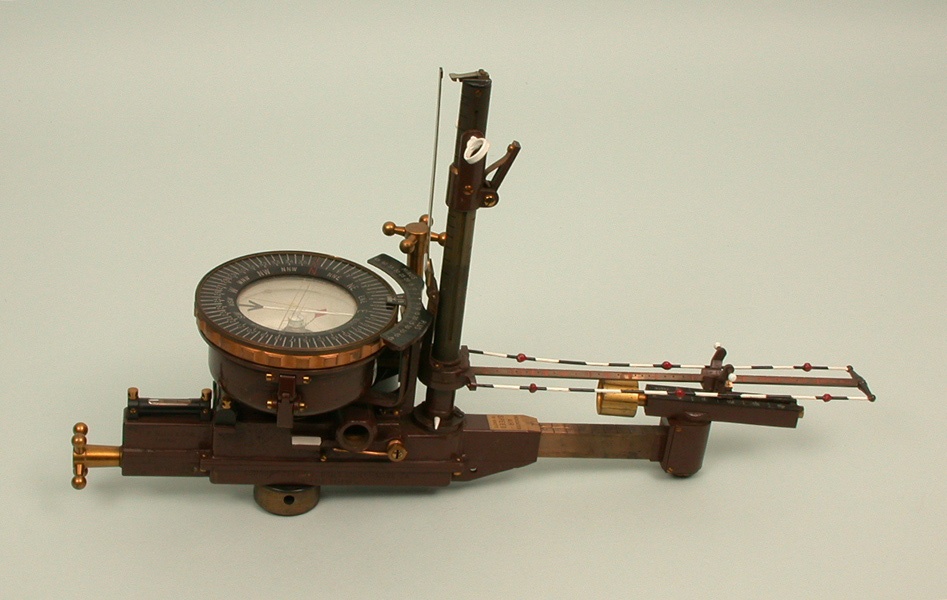
Course Setting Bomb Sight Mk IA in the collection of the RAF Museum. This example has been set for a wind just off the left side of the tail, as indicated by the arrowhead in the compass rose. The matching rotation of the wind bar can be seen.

When an aircraft flies in the presence of wind, its flight path over the ground is a function of the aircraft's airspeed, heading, and the speed and direction of the wind. These are combined using basic vector addition to return the course made good or track. These calculations are a basic part of air navigation and dead reckoning, taught to all aviators. Wimperis was an expert on the topic, and would later write a well-known book about it.

To aid in the necessary calculations, it was common to use a simple mechanical calculator that combined a slide-rule like calculator on one side with a vector calculator on the other. The best-known modern example is the E6-B, which remains a basic part of every pilot and navigator's toolkit. Using the vector calculator and basic measurements, one can easily calculate the winds aloft and then the course made good. These calculations are identical to those needed to properly account for the effects of winds on the bombing approach. The problem was that these calculations were complex, time-consuming and error prone.

Wimperis decided to attack the calculation problem by incorporating a similar vector calculator directly into the bombsight, combining it with a drift measure similar to the one from the earlier Drift Sight. Like the Drift sight, simply taking a measure of the wind using the sight itself provided all of the unknown variables needed to completely calculate the bombing approach. Unlike the Drift Sight, the new design not only calculated the effect on the distance the bombs travelled, but also indicated the proper direction to fly to approach the target so the aircraft reached it with no residual sideways motion – thereby cancelling any drift no matter the direction of approach.

His new Course Setting Bomb Sight featured a large compass at the rear that could be used for making general calculations of wind speed or solving navigational problems. In most cases these could be ignored; the bomb aimer dialled in the wind direction on the compass, then wind speed, airspeed and altitude on different knobs. Through internal mechanisms, these adjustments carried out all of the calculations needed to set the approach and range angle. Through these calculations the CSBS allowed bombing from any direction, freeing the aircraft from the wind line for the first time.

=== Production and use ===
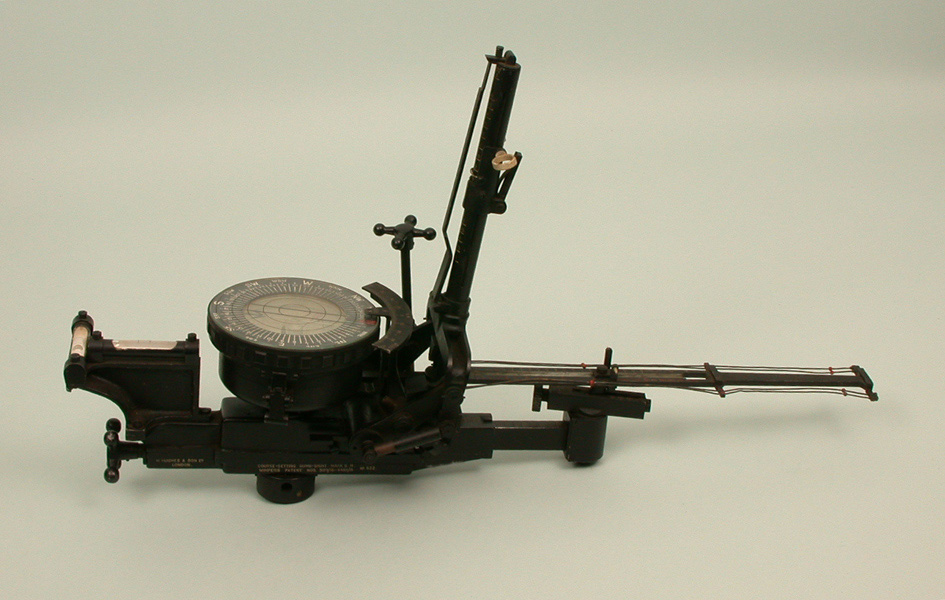
The post-WWI Mk. IIH was one of a series of Mk. II designs introduced around 1920. Two differences in this H model are the prominent spirit level assembly on the left, and the doubled-up drift wires on the right that make it easier for the bomb aimer to measure and correct residual wind drift. More difficult to see is the trail setting screw, which rotates the height bar forward.

In testing in December 1917 at the Scilly Isles air station, in eight bomb runs the CSBS scored two direct hits, and near-misses on all six other runs. Production quickly followed, and by 1918 about 720 had been produced. The Royal Flying Corps (RFC) started using the Mark I sight as soon as supplies were available, and by April 1918 were also fully converted to this type.

For his work on the CSBS and the Drift Sight Wimperis was awarded £2,100 by the Royal Commission on Awards to Inventors.

In the post-war era, work on new bombsights was seriously curtailed, and little new development had taken place by 1930. Several minor variations of the CSBS had been introduced during this period to adapt to higher speeds, higher or lower altitudes, and new types of bombs. These also included a separate adjustment for trail, the deceleration of the bomb due to drag. At low speeds and altitudes the time between drop and impact was too short for the bombs to reach terminal velocity so the trajectory of the bombs was roughly parabolic. At higher altitudes or forward speeds the bombs would reach terminal long before impact, which had the effect of making the last portion of the flight path more vertical. The trail adjustment, set by dialling in the measured terminal velocity for the bombs being dropped, used a cam to move the height bar forward away from the vertical, reducing the range angle and thereby reducing the range to account for this effect.

Many thousands of CSBSs were sold around the world, and many other sights were developed from the basic idea. In the mid-1930s, the basic CSBS concept was largely universal for production bombsights.

=== Mk. VII and IX ===
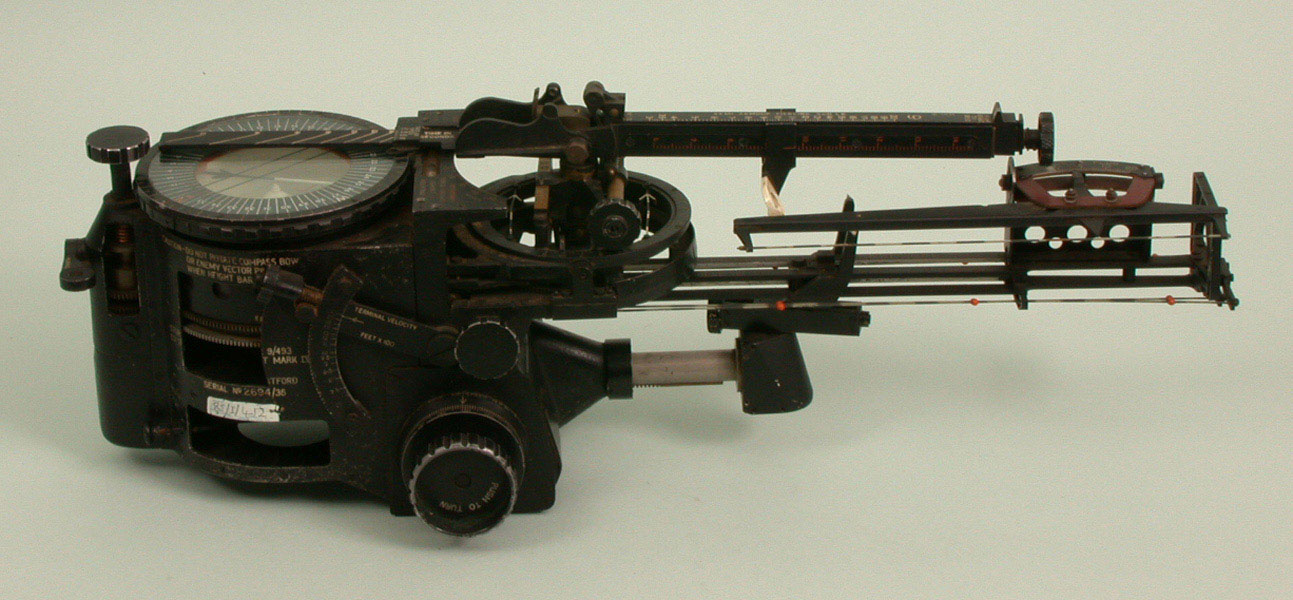
The more complex Mk. IX and similar Mk. VII versions included adjustments for moving targets (horizontal rings at center) and indirectly measuring drift (assembly on the far right). This example is folded into its stowed position, with the height bar rotated down over the drift bar.

During its development prior to the opening of World War II, the CSBS added several new features. A simple modification found on pre-war models was the Auxiliary Drift Bar attachment. This consisted of a single drift wire in a C-shaped clamp that could be moved along the main drift wires, and rotated in relation to them. Previously, the bomb aimer would use the main drift bar as a tool to measure wind speed, but it was found that the bomb aimers would forget to reset it to the proper angle for bombing when things got busy. These same measurements could be made with the Auxiliary Bar, leaving the main drift bar in the proper position.

Later versions used by RAF Coastal Command and the Royal Navy also included a further adjustment, the Fourth Vector, for attacking moving targets. This was primarily intended for use against ships and submarines. This was a fairly complex system of rotating rings and sliders that allowed the bomb aimer to dial in the relative course of the target and its estimated speed. This moved the backsight directly fore and aft, and turning the heading dial adjusted how much the speed dial moved the backsight. As the resulting mechanism was fairly large and complex, the sights were also available with the Fourth Vector removed, denoted with a *, as in the Mk. IX A*.

=== Mk. X ===
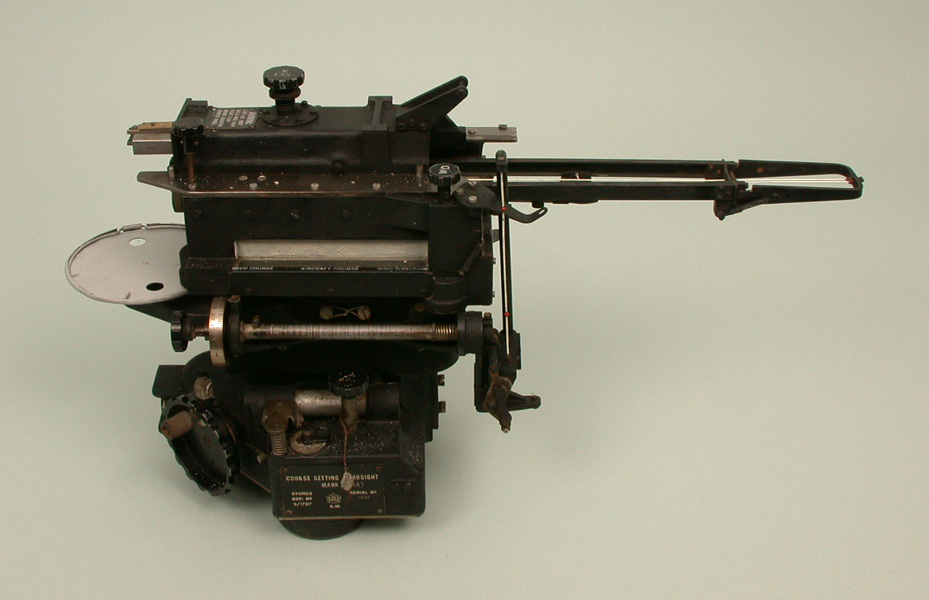
The Mk. X is a dramatic change from earlier models, removing the direct relationship between the parts and their functions. For instance, altitude is now set via a knob on the left side of the device (far side of this image) read against a rotating scale. This example is missing the compass, normally set on the metal plate on the left.

Prior to the war a major redesign of the CSBS was underway. The new Mk. X replaced the vertical slider used for altitude adjustment with a horizontally-moving backsight at the top of the device, and the entire foresight and drift wire area was made considerably smaller. The calculator and wind drift settings, formerly mounted on top and in front of the large compass at the rear of the earlier models, was moved to the left side of the device and changed in form to make it smaller as well. The compass, no longer containing pointers and dials, was replaced with a smaller unit. The result was a version of the CSBS that was much smaller than earlier versions.

About 5,000 of the new Mk. X were built and awaiting fitting to aircraft at the opening stages of the war. After the disastrous raid on Wilhelmshaven in 1939, the RAF was forced to abandon daylight attacks and move to night bombing. The Mk. X proved to have very poor visibility at night, and it would be difficult to modify it to correct this problem. The Mk. X had to be abandoned, and Mk. VII's and Mk. IX's hurriedly re-fit to aircraft. Thus the older versions of the CSBS soldiered on long after they were due to be replaced, and remained the primary British bombsights into 1942. The Mk. VII was widely found on slower aircraft and training schools, while the Mk. IX was used in higher speed aircraft.

=== Mk. XI ===
Another problem with all of the existing CSBS designs was that it could only be read correctly with the aircraft absolutely level. This was true especially during the run-up to the drop point, when the sight was used to correct the direction of flight through the use of the drift wires. The biplane bombers the CSBS had been developed for had the ability to slip-turn using the rudder only, which made it simple for the pilot to adjust their heading without affecting the aim too much. Modern monoplanes were subject to an effect known as dutch roll (Note: Dutch roll causes the forward-moving wing to rise due to its increasing airspeed relative to the rearward wing as the aircraft yaws.) that makes them oscillate for a time after turning to a new heading. During this time the drift wires were difficult to use, so the entire process of correcting the flight path was greatly extended.

In the aftermath of the Wilhelmshaven raid on 3 September 1939, it was found that the lengthy setup and bomb run demanded by the CSBS made its aircraft extremely vulnerable to fighters and anti-aircraft artillery. At a pre-arranged meeting on 22 December 1939, Air Chief Marshal Sir Edgar Ludlow-Hewitt made a request for a new bombsight that did not require such a long run into the target, and which would allow the aircraft to manoeuvre throughout the bomb run.

The solution to this problem was well understood within the industry: use gyroscopes to provide a level platform to mount the bombsight so it did not move relative to the ground even if the aircraft moved. Today these are known as an inertial platform. However, the large physical size of the CSBS series, especially the long drift bar, made it difficult to mount successfully on a platform. A compromise solution was designed as the Mk. XI, which mounted a single drift wire and iron sight on the front of a gyroscope taken from a Sperry artificial horizon that was already common in RAF use. This provided stabilization in the roll axis, which greatly eased the problem of sighting while maneuvering.

In order to make it fit on the platform, all of the mechanical calculator portions of the sight were removed. Instead, the bomb aimer had to use manual slide rule calculators to find the drift and bombing angles, and then set the bombsight to these values. The bombsight was unable to quickly adapt to changes in direction or altitude, and in this case was even slower to calculate such changes. Very few of the Mk. XI designs were produced.

=== Mk. XII and Mk. XIV, a new approach ===
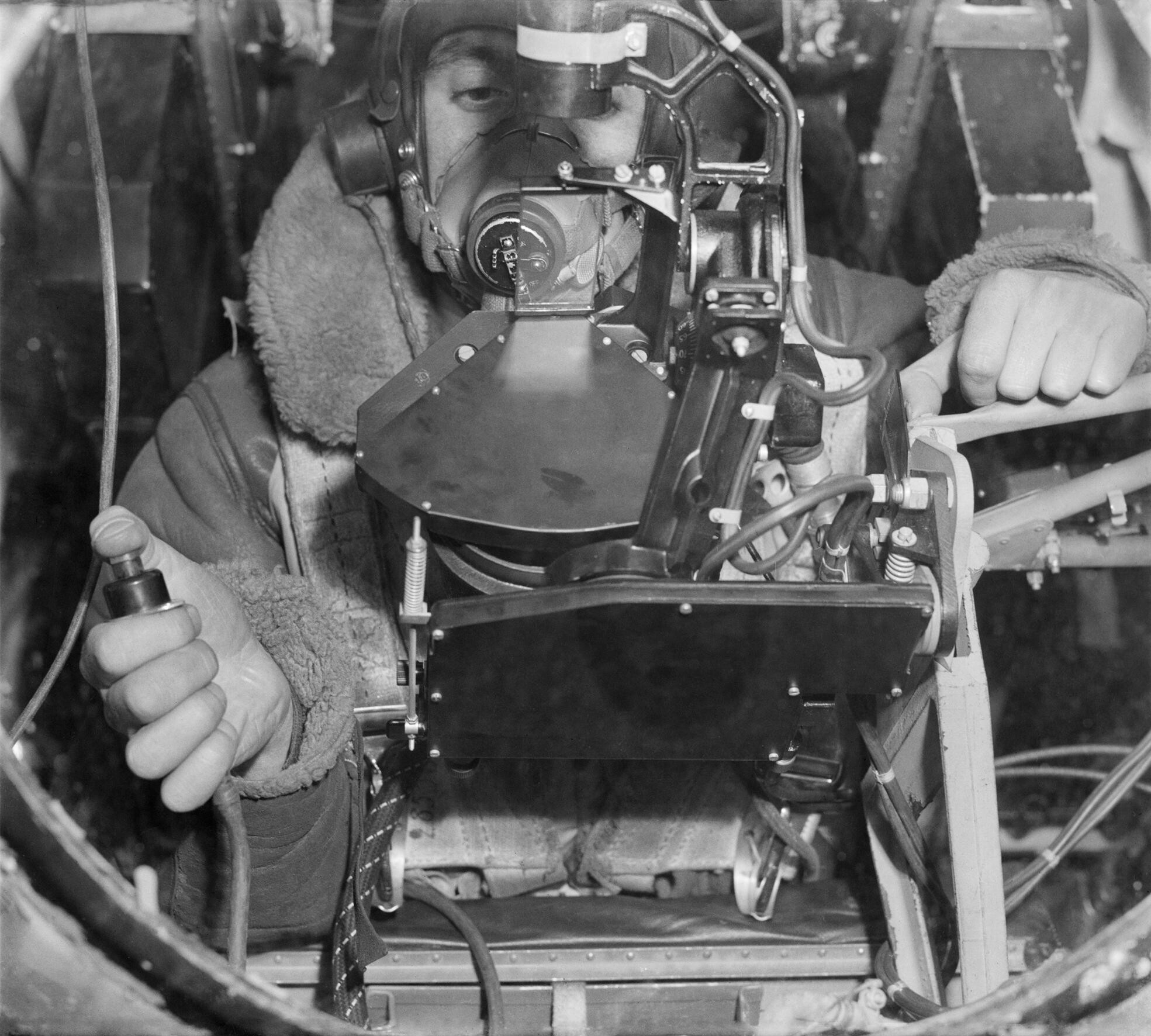
The Mk. XIV was much easier to use than the CSBS it replaced. This example, in an Avro Lancaster, is stabilized and uses an optical system in place of the drift bar.

As if these problems were not enough, the RAF found in the training schools that it was all too common for the bomb aimers to dial in an incorrect setting, or forget to update one when conditions changed. It was planned that many of these problems would be solved on the Automatic Bomb Sight (ABS), which had been under development from before the war, and used very simple inputs from the bomb aimer to carry out all the needed calculations. Unfortunately, the ABS was even larger than the CSBS, and the demands for new bombsights to be stabilized would make it even larger and further delay its service entry.

Something was needed in the meantime. The physicist and scientific advisor Patrick Blackett took up the challenge of fixing all of these problems at once, producing the Blackett sight with the Royal Aircraft Establishment. (Note: Although the Mk. XII and XIV were dramatically different from the CSBS designs they replaced and are generally considered to be new and unrelated designs, the Air Ministry decided to place them in the same sequence of development, giving them the next model number in the existing series.)

First, the manual calculator was replaced by an external box operated by a new crew member. The box contained the inputs needed to drive the vector calculator, as well as copies of the various aircraft instruments displaying the required information. The operator simply had to keep the input dials set so their indicators overlapped those on the instruments. (Note: This basic system was already widely used in the Navy and anti-aircraft units, where it was known as laying needle on needle.) Turning the dials drove the machine to calculate the correct angles, as on the earlier CSBS models, but then fed them directly into a remote sighting unit, the sighting head. This provided practically instant updates of the sighting angles.

The wire sights of the earlier models were replaced by reflector sights indicating the location the bombs would hit if dropped at that instant. This used a lighted optical crosshairs, which was perfectly visible at night. As the sighting head lacked the vector computer it was much smaller than earlier models, which allowed it to be easily mounted on a stabilized platform. This allowed the sights to be used even while the aircraft was maneuvering, and required only 10 seconds to settle.

Together, these changes dramatically simplified the task of maintaining an accurate bombsight setting. On the downside, it required the addition of a new crew member to operate the system. This was not a minor problem as most aircraft had no room for them. This led to the ultimate development of the series, the Mk. XIV. This version replaced the manual input dials with ones powered by air suction bled from the engines. Before the mission, the bomb aimer entered basic information about the target altitude and the bombs being dropped, and periodically updated the wind speed and direction. Everything else was fully automated. Versions were also developed that replaced the altitude measurement with a radar altimeter for low-altitude use, but these Mk. XV and Mk. XVII were not used operationally.

The Mk. XIV was a major advance over the Mk. IX, but service entry was slow. It was not until January 1942 that it was given priority. This was aided by Sperry Gyroscope, who re-designed the system to U.S. production methods. They sub-contracted construction to A.C. Spark Plug who built tens of thousands as the Sperry T-1. It did not offer the level of accuracy of tachometric bombsights like the Norden or ABS, but for night area bombing from medium altitude as practiced by RAF Bomber Command this was not an issue. The Mk. XIV remained in RAF use until 1965.

=== SABS ===
Later in the war the development of the Tallboy and Grand Slam earthquake bombs demanded accuracy that even the Mk. XIV could not supply. For this role, the Automatic Bomb Sight was dusted off and mounted to new stabilization platform, producing the Stabilised Automatic Bomb Sight. This complex device was available only in very small numbers from late 1943 on, and used only by specific groups within the RAF.

== Description ==
The following description is based on the Mk. IX as described in A.P.1730A, but will be separated into sections on the basic operation and the later additions.

=== Crosswind bombing ===
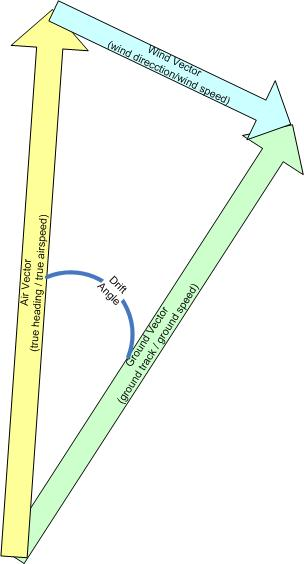
In order to approach a target at the tip of the green arrow with the crosswind indicated in blue, the bomber has to turn upwind and point its nose in the direction of the yellow arrow. By flying in that direction, the wind will blow the bomber along the green line.

The bombsight problem is the need to determine the exact spot in the air where the bombs should be dropped to hit a target on the ground. Due to the acceleration of gravity, bombs follow a roughly parabolic path, the steepness being defined by the forward speed of the aircraft at the instant of release. The distance the bombs travel between being dropped and hitting the ground is known as the range, it is a function of the speed and the time to fall, the latter a function of altitude. The bomber attempts to manoeuvre along a line toward the target and then drop the bombs at the instant they are that distance, the range, from the target. The location at that instant is known as the drop point or point of release.

Simple trigonometry can calculate the angle that the target would appear when the aircraft was at the drop point. This is known as the range angle or drop angle, and was typically looked up from a set of pre-computed tables or using a simple mechanical calculator. The bombsight is then set to that angle, and the bomb aimer drops the bombs when the target passes through the sights.

In the presence of a cross-wind, as the aircraft flies forward the wind will push it sideways, away from the drop point. The solution is to calculate the angle that the aircraft should fly in order to cancel out this drift, the difference between the course and the heading. Calculating the proper drift angle is a simple task of basic vector addition, and is commonly carried out on a circular slide rule like the E6-B. This is a somewhat time-consuming process. The CSBS solved this problem by reproducing the basic vector math in a mechanical system. The vectors that would normally be drawn by hand were duplicated in a series of screws, gears and sliding components. By dialling in the four inputs, altitude, airspeed, wind speed and wind direction, the mechanism moved the aiming pippers so they directly represented the required heading and range angle for the current airspeed and altitude.

The wind will also have an effect on the bomb after it leaves the aircraft. As bombs are generally well streamlined and have high density, this effect is much smaller in magnitude than the effects of the wind on the aircraft itself. For instance, consider a bomber at 20,000 feet (6,100 m) altitude dropping a stick of AN-M65 500 lb general-purpose bombs. These bombs will take approximately 37 seconds to reach the ground. In a 25 miles per hour (40 km/h) wind the bomb will move about 1,350 ft (410 m) due to the wind's effect on the aircraft's ground speed. In comparison, the effect of the wind after leaving the aircraft would be only 300 ft (91 m).

=== Basic mechanism ===
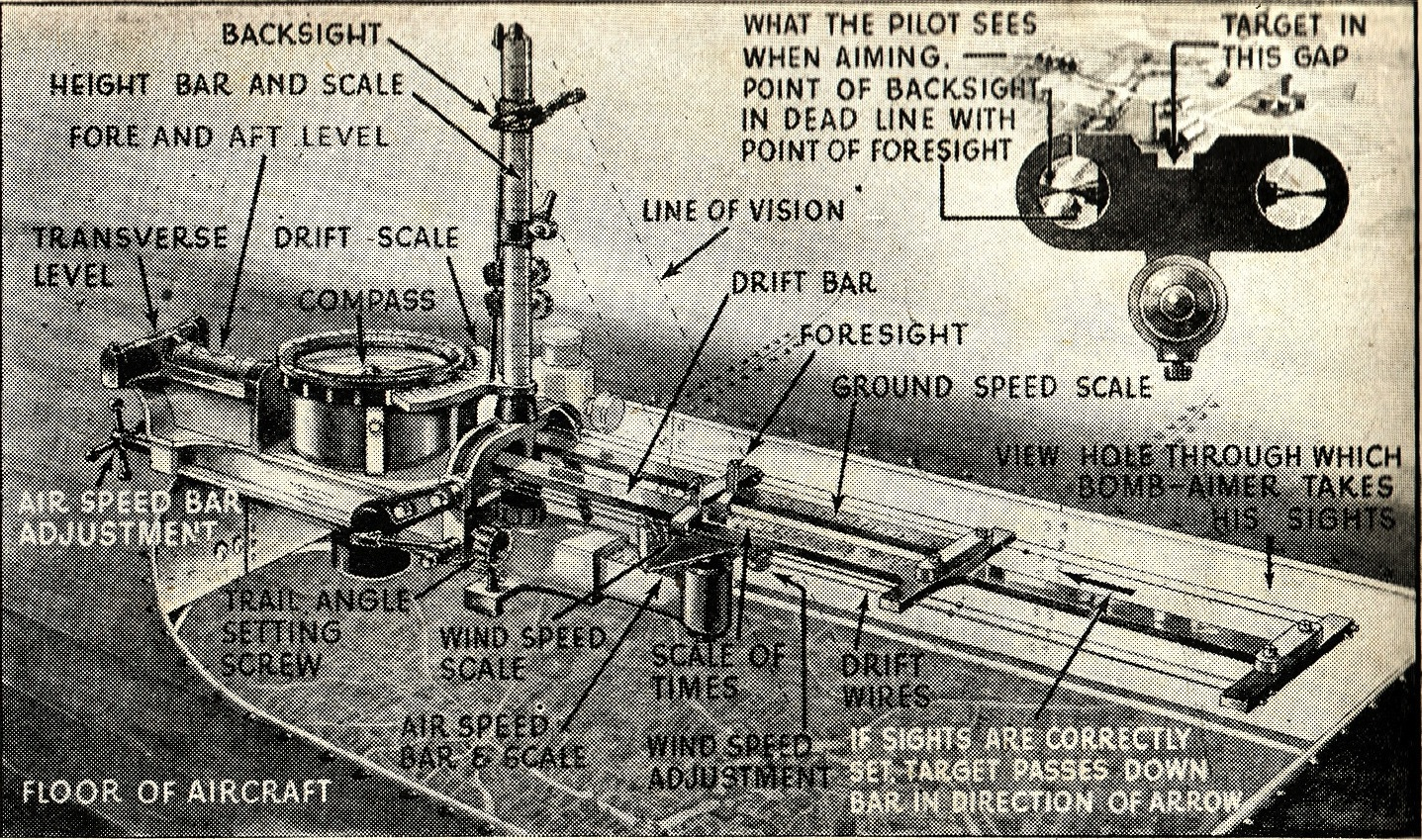
This diagram of the CSBS appeared in newspapers just before WWII. Key components are the compass and directional calculator at the rear, drift bar for course correction and airspeed setting extending at the front, and the vertical scale for altitude setting extending vertically.

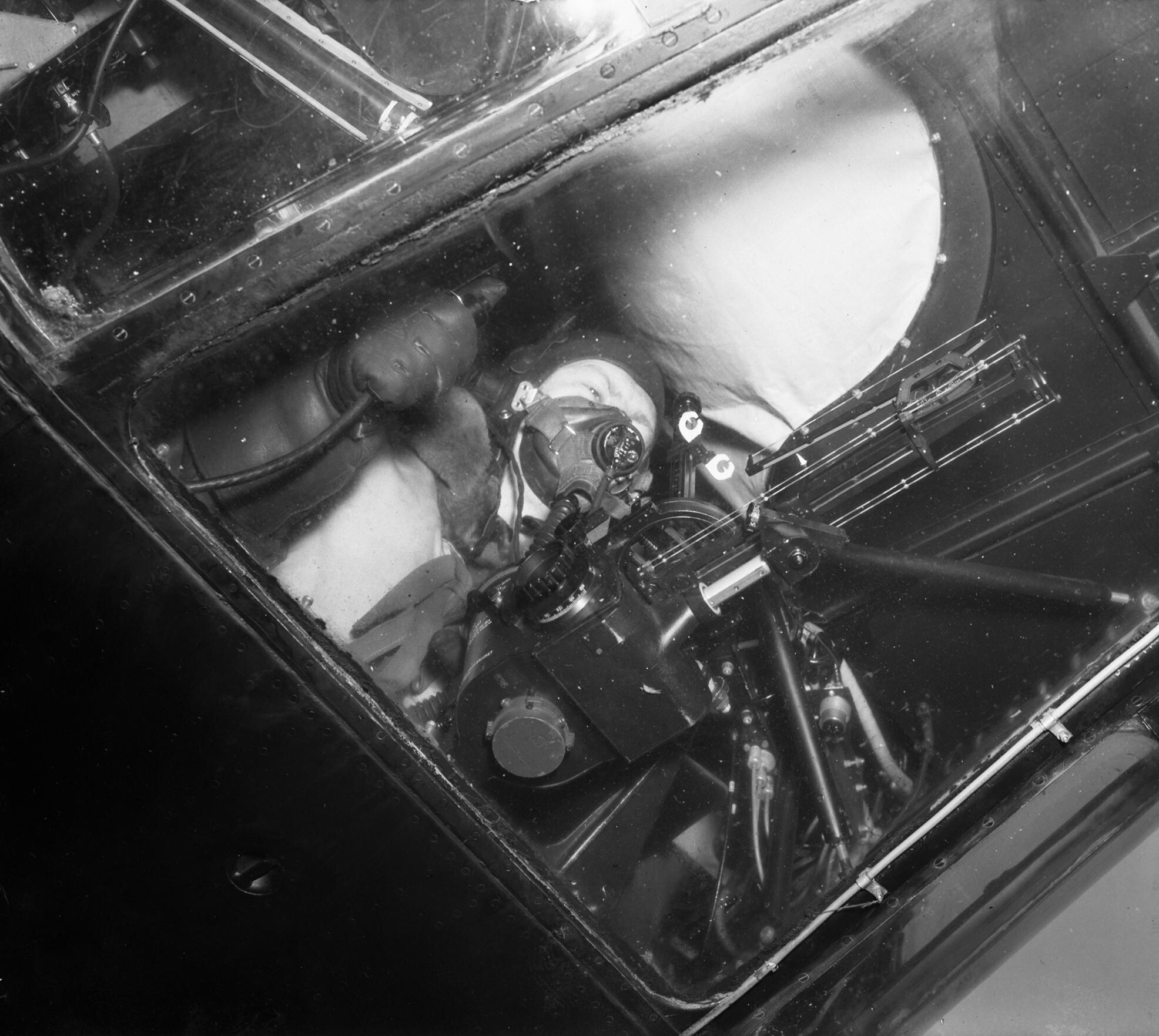
Installation of the CBSS in the Short Stirling bomber left ample room to work. The details of the air speed and wind speed bars are clear in this example.

Opening the adjacent diagram in a separate window will greatly ease the understanding of the following description.

At the rear of the CSBS is a large compass with a slip ring carrying a rotating compass rose known as the bearing plate. The bearing plate has lines on it that are used to represent the wind direction during manual calculations. The top of the bearing plate was designed to be drawn on with a chinagraph pencil so it could serve as a general navigation calculator as well.

On early models, rotating the compass face also rotated a shaft that ran forward under the main body of the bombsight and through a metal tube running out the lower front of the main housing. On later models, a large knob known as the milled head was placed directly behind the compass and drove this shaft independently of the compass face, allowing calculations to be carried out without changing the bombsight settings. The rotating shaft ran to the wind bar located in front of the body of the bombsight. The rotation of this bar to the selected angle mechanically represented the wind vector relative to the aircraft. At the end of the wind bar is the wind screw knob, which is used to set the wind speed. As the knob is rotated, a plate inside the wind bar moves fore and aft along the direction of the bar.

Connected to and extending from the front of the main bombsight housing is the drift bar, normally forming over half the overall length of the device. The drift bar is pivoted at its base, just in front of the compass area, allowing it to rotate to the left or right. On top of the wind bar, connecting the wind bar to the drift bar, is the ground speed slider. A pin passing vertically through the wind bar's internal slider to slotted plates in the drift bar and ground speed slider translate the motion of the wind bar into components along and across the axis of the drift bar. Motion across the axis pushes the entire wind bar to the left or right, indicating the proper heading to fly to cancel out the wind drift. Motion along the axis pushes the ground speed slider fore or aft, accounting for the difference between air and ground speed. The ground speed slider also carries the pin-shaped foresights, so as they move they adjust the sighting angle in order to drop the bombs early or late to account for the ground speed.

The motion of the wind bar and wind screw knob accounts for two of the three vectors involved in the windage calculation. The last is the airspeed of the bomber – its absolute direction can be ignored if everything is measured in terms of the direction to the target, as in the case of the CSBS. The length of this vector is set by the air speed drum, found on the right side of the main case (or at the back of the device on earlier versions). Turning the air speed knob that pushes the tube carrying the wind direction shaft fore or aft. A housing at the end of this tube carries the wind bar, so rotating the airspeed drum moves the entire wind speed calculation fore and aft to account for increasing or decreasing airspeed.

Once set, the combination of the air speed, wind direction and wind speed provided all of the vector inputs, and the angle of the drift bar and position of the foresight formed the output. The drift wires running down either side of the drift bar were used to measure the drift once calculated, to ensure the aircraft was flying along the correct heading to zero out any wind drift.

The bombsight solution is now almost complete, having calculated the ground speed and zeroed out any sideways drift. All that is left is the calculation of the time of fall, which, multiplied by the ground speed, gives the range. The CSBS solves this through the height bar, which extends vertically from the center of the device where the compass section meets the drift bar. Turning a knob at the top of the height bar (or using a slip fitting on earlier models) moves the height slider up or down to set the aircraft's altitude. Once set, the angle between backsights on the height slider and foresights on the ground speed slider indicates the proper range angle, no lookups required. The bomb aimer then sights along this angle and waits for the target to appear, dropping the bombs when it appears under a notch in the backsight.

Although a bomb's trajectory is roughly parabolic, when the bomb is dropped from high altitudes it may reach terminal velocity before hitting the ground. This affects the final trajectory in a non-linear fashion, generally making the line of fall more vertical. To account for this a trail screw was added starting with the Mk. II version of the CSBS, which rotated the height bar forward. This had the effect of reducing the range angle, which accounted for the more vertical trajectory of the bombs. This effect only comes into play for high altitudes when the bomb has time to build up speed. Later models of the CSBS, starting with the Mk. VII, used a cam that was driven by both the altitude setting and the trail screw in order to automate the calculation of this effect. Additionally, each aircraft has a slightly different way of measuring altitude that needs adjustment, the CSBS accounted for this effect by including two altitude scales, a linear scale of altitude in orange on the right side of the bar, and any number of white scales on the back that could be clipped onto the sight. The two were used in combination to make adjustments for the altitude of the target over sea level.

=== Practical example ===
The operation of the CSBS is best understood using a simple example. For this the windage triangle shown in the section above will be used, combined with the operational description from AP1730.

The problem for the bomber is to approach a target located at the tip of the green arrow, compared to its current position at the base of the arrow. A powerful (Note: Unrealistically powerful, for the purposes of making the illustration more obvious.) wind is blowing from just off the port wing of the aircraft, blowing towards about 120 degrees. If the aircraft simply points toward the target, along the green arrow, the wind will cause it to drift to the right. In order to approach the target properly, the aircraft needs to turn to the left until the portion of its airspeed equal to the wind speed cancels out the drift. The resulting direction is represented by the yellow arrow in the diagram above.

On the CSBS each of these arrows has a mechanical equivalent in the bombsight. The direction of the yellow arrow is that of the aircraft itself, represented in the bombsight by its mounting to the aircraft fuselage. The length of the yellow arrow is set by rotating the air speed drum, carrying the windage calculator with it. The milled head is used to rotate the wind bar to the same angle as the wind, in this case about 120 degrees. This would leave the wind bar almost at right angles to the drift bar, with the wind speed knob easily accessible on the left. Finally, the wind speed would be dialled into the wind speed knob, which would push the entire drift bar assembly to the right. When all of the adjustments are complete, the bombsight and airspeed shaft mechanically represent the yellow arrow, the wind bar represents the blue arrow, and the green arrow is formed by the drift wires providing direction, and the foresight is positioned at the tip of the green arrow.

Once set, the bomb aimer uses the rear sights, or any other convenient part of the bombsight, as a reference location and spots past them through the drift wires. Although these are now angled several degrees to the right, the wind to the right is pushing the aircraft so its final motion is along the wires. When initially set up the aircraft would likely be flying a course close to the green arrow, so the bomb aimer would see the targets drifting to the left relative to the wires. He would call the pilot and ask him to turn to the left and then watch the results. In some aircraft, a pilot direction indicator would be used. Several corrections are normally required before the aircraft is flying along the yellow line and the residual drift is entirely cancelled out.

=== Measuring the wind ===
Although the CSBS automated the calculation of the effects of the wind, it did not automate the measurement of the wind itself. The bombsight manual describes several ways to do this.

One is an adaptation of the method used with the Drift Sight. Prior to approaching the target, the bomb aimer would have the pilot turn onto the expected wind line, and dials in zero wind speed and due north wind direction, which points the drift bar straight forward. With the bar in this position, the bomb aimer uses the drift wires to tune out any sideways drift and thereby find the exact wind direction. The bearing plate is rotated to the compass heading and locked, thereby recording the wind direction for future reference. The pilot then turned 90 degrees to one side or the other, placing the wind directly off the side of the aircraft. The bomb aimer then rotated the milled head to the same 90 degrees. At this point the wind speed knob is adjusted, pushing the drift bar sideways until objects on the ground could be seen moving directly along the drift wires. The wind speed is now known and set, and the aircraft can then manoeuvre as it wants with only the milled head needing adjustment.

A later modification to the CSBS, and supplied with most of the Mk. VII and Mk. IX examples, was the auxiliary drift bar. This was attached at the front of the main drift bar and consisted of a single drift wire mounted on a rotating fixture. This allowed relative measurements of the drift relative to the aircraft without having to rotate the main drift bar and thereby possibly leave the sight in an incorrect setting.

To use the system, the bomb aimer would lower the auxiliary bar and rotate it until objects were moving along its single wire. This provided a measurement relative to the current setting, say +10. The aimer could then update the wind bar to the correct setting. Next, the ground speed was measured by timing objects as they passed through any two sets of small beads on the main drift bar using a stopwatch.

To calculate the resulting wind speed and direction, systems with the auxiliary bar were also equipped with the wind gauge bar. This was normally stowed folded against the back of the height bar, but could be rotated down and to the rear to lie over the compass. The top of the bar was indexed in seconds, corresponding to the measurement made of the times using the stopwatch. The cursor slid along the wind bar and was set to that measurement. A small scale on the cursor allowed for the conversion of indicated air speed to true air speed, which differs depending on altitude. A small ring on the right side of the cursor was used to accurately place markings on the compass using the grease pencil. The face of the compass was then rotated to the aircraft heading, which caused the dot to move. The resulting position indicated the wind speed and direction. A holder for the pencil and a sharpener blade were attached on the left side of the case.

The third method of determining the wind is used in conjunction with the wind gauge bar. The aircraft is flown on three different headings, typically 120 degrees apart, and the time for the aircraft to travel a certain distance was measured with the timing beads. The bearing plate was rotated to match the compass heading of each leg, and the cursor was moved along the bar to draw a line on the bearing plate along that direction. After three such measurements, a small triangle was formed. The aircraft then turned onto the bomb line. Using the drift angle measured from the auxiliary drift bar, the compass was rotated to that drift angle, and the cursor moved so it lay above the center of the triangle. This indicated the direction and speed of the wind.

=== Other details ===
Levelling the bombsight was required before any use. The bombsight included two spirit levels for this, and was mounted to a friction-set ball so it could be rotated in any direction. This allowed it to be mounted to the side of aircraft like the Supermarine Walrus, or to the floor of dedicated bomber aircraft like the Bristol Blenheim. As the most common change in angle is due to changes in aircraft trim with changes in airspeed, earlier models featured a prominent setting for correcting the fore-aft angle of the sight, which can be seen on the left side of pre-Mk. VII models in the images above.

Naval versions of the Mk. VII and IX, and most supplied to Bomber Command as well, included an additional adjustment for moving targets. Attacking a moving target is similar to the basic concept for correcting for wind, although, unlike wind, the target's movement may be significant even after the bomb is dropped. The CSBS accounted for this through the use of the enemy vector mechanism or fourth vector, which was similar to the wind mechanism but operated at the origin of the drift bar instead of a point located along it. Setting the enemy speed screw or enemy direction knob moved a mechanism similar to the wind bar, but the movement along the track moved the entire height bar fore or aft.
