= Maritime patrol =

Reconnaissance actions over water

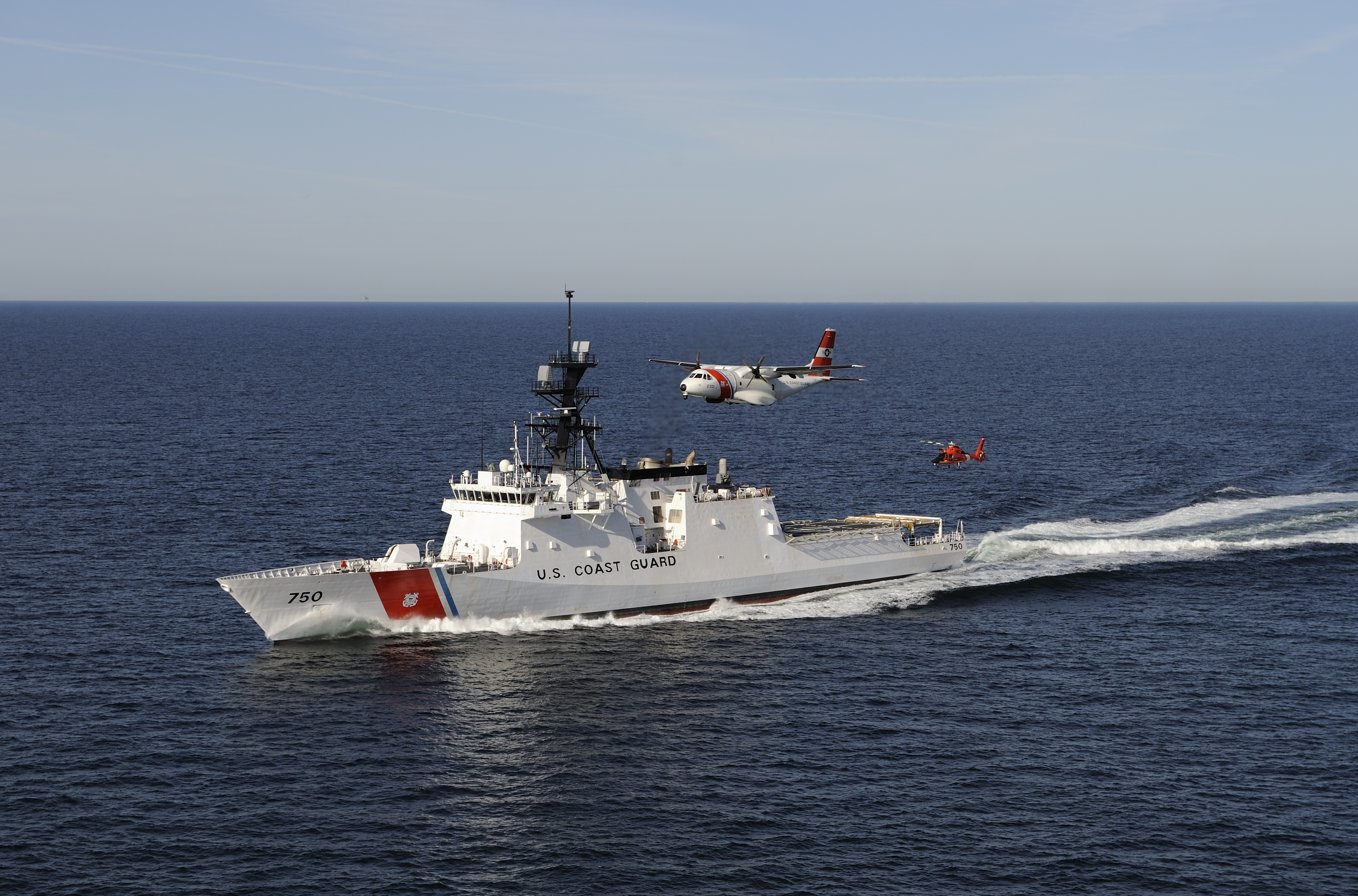
A United States Coast Guard cutter with one of the force's maritime patrol aircraft and a helicopter

Maritime patrol or maritime reconnaissance is the task of monitoring areas of water. Generally conducted by military and law enforcement agencies, maritime patrol is usually aimed at identifying human activities.

Maritime patrol refers to active patrol of an area, as opposed to passive monitoring systems such as sound-detection fixtures or land-based spotters. A patrol consists of a ship, submarine, aircraft or satellite examining the patrolled area and seeking out activities to be identified and reported. Maritime patrol is critical in wartime situations for navies to locate enemy forces to engage or defend against. Peacetime patrols are important for interdiction of criminal activities and for ensuring legal use of waters.

Maritime patrols can be conducted by surface ships and submarines, by aircraft (e.g. Maritime patrol aircraft), other aerial vehicles, and even by satellites. Human spotting remains an important part of detecting activity, but increasingly electronic systems are used.

== Type ==
- Military: Navies and air forces employ patrols to locate and identify enemy or potential enemy ships and submarines. The patrols report these findings to combat vessels which can then take appropriate action. Characteristics to identify are the numbers and types of vessels, as well as bearing and speed information to assist tracking the units. Anti-submarine patrols often deploy sonobuoys or other devices to assist with tracking. During peacetime, patrols are maintained by military forces for practice and to prevent surprise deployments by enemies.
- Law enforcement: Countries with extensive coastlines are vulnerable to those entering or exiting the country undetected. In particular smuggling is often carried out over water. Law enforcement agencies often employ maritime patrols to assist interception of such activities.
- Economic: Water areas, in particular those close to the coast, are areas of economic activity. Not only shipping but also fishing and even tourism are important economic activities to coastal countries. Patrolling these waters falls to maritime patrols. Such patrols may seek fishing vessels which are outside prescribed fishing grounds (often from neighboring countries' fleets) or which are not adhering to regulations. Additionally, patrols may assist customs agencies by monitoring commercial shipping traffic in controlled waters.
- Coast defence: Coast defence identifies and intercepts threats to coastal areas. This may include preventing infiltrations or discouraging enemy surveillance of coastal installations. Law enforcement patrols aim at preventing criminals from reaching the shoreline.
- Rescue: Although it is not necessarily a primary mission of maritime patrol assets, they are often used to assist in maritime rescue operations, both for searching and often to extract survivors too.
