= RAF Coastal Command during World War II =

Royal Air Force formation during World War II

Coastal Command was a formation within the Royal Air Force (RAF). Founded in 1936, it was to act as the RAF maritime arm, after the Fleet Air Arm became part of the Royal Navy in 1937. Naval aviation was neglected in the inter-war period, 1919–1939, and as a consequence the service did not receive the resources it needed to develop properly or efficiently. This continued until the outbreak of the Second World War, during which it came to prominence. Owing to the Air Ministry's concentration on Fighter Command and Bomber Command, Coastal Command was often referred to as the "Cinderella Service", a phrase first used by the First Lord of the Admiralty at the time A. V. Alexander.

Its primary task was to protect convoys from the German Kriegsmarine's U-boat force. It also protected Allied shipping from the aerial threat posed by the Luftwaffe. The main operations of Coastal Command were defensive, defending supplies lines in the various theatres of war, most notably the Battle of the Atlantic. A limited number of detachments served in the Mediterranean, Middle East and African theatres under the control of Coastal Command from 1941, operating from a headquarters in Gibraltar. Coastal Command squadrons operated from bases in the United Kingdom, Iceland, Gibraltar, the Soviet Union, West Africa and North Africa. Coastal Command also served in an offensive capacity. In the Mediterranean and Baltic it carried out attacks on German shipping moving war materials from Italy to North Africa and from Scandinavia to Germany. By 1943 Coastal Command finally received the recognition it needed and its operations proved decisive in the victory over the U-boats.

The service saw action from the first day of hostilities until the last day of the Second World War. It flew over one million flying hours in 240,000 operations, and destroyed 212 U-boats. Coastal Command's casualties amounted to 2,060 aircraft to all causes and some 5,866 personnel killed in action. During 1940–1945 Coastal Command sank 366 German transport vessels and damaged 134. The total tonnage sunk was 512,330 tons and another 513,454 tons damaged. A total of 10,663 persons were rescued by the Command, including 5,721 Allied crews, 277 enemy personnel, and 4,665 non-aircrews.

== Equipment ==
=== Aircraft ===
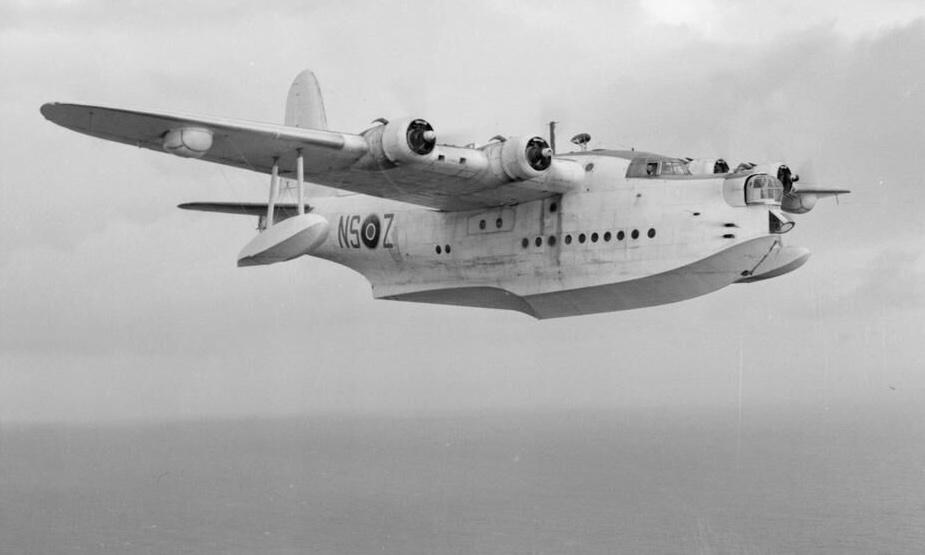
Sunderland, a rare success for pre-war procurement.

On the outbreak of war in 1939 Coastal Command had 18 squadrons. These consisted of ten squadrons of Avro Ansons, including four squadrons manned by the Royal Auxiliary Air Force, two of Vickers Vildebeests, two of Short Sunderlands, three of Saro London and one of Supermarine Stranraers. The Anson had insufficient range for long-range reconnaissance which was left to the flying-boats, four squadrons of which were equipped with the obsolescent Vildebeest and London. Only three squadrons with suitable aircraft, the Lockheed Hudson and Sunderland, were effective. Anson engines were in limited supply in 1939 and the Sunderland and Hudson airframes were also limited, the latter being delivered at a rate of just two per month. To fill the gap in production capacity, the Air Ministry dispatched several missions to the United States to buy more Hudson airframes.

The Director of Organisation at the Air Ministry Charles Portal recognised there would be a problem in procurement of aircraft. Coastal Command's operational nature would make twenty-four hour operations a basic requirement. Suitable aircraft for take-off and landing, in particular flying-boats, in all weather was vital for the safety of crews and the effectiveness of the Command. The new twin-engine Saro Lerwick had been touted as the ideal aircraft. It came into service in April 1939 but was a disaster. There was a need for long-range machines to cover the South-Western Approaches and in December 1939 to August 1940, No. 10 Squadron of the Royal Australian Air Force (RAAF) received Sunderlands while No. 235 Squadron, No. 236 Squadron, No. 248 Squadron and No. 254 Squadron were equipped with Bristol Blenheims from RAF Fighter Command in February 1940. In June 1940 No. 53 Squadron and No. 59 Squadron received Blenheims on loan from RAF Bomber Command and two months later No. 98 Squadron was provided with Fairey Battles, also on loan from Bomber Command and based in Iceland. By 15 June a further 15 squadrons were to have been handed over to Coastal Command, this was only achieved by the loan of seven squadrons from other commands, despite an agreement by the Air Ministry and Admiralty. The daily operational strength of Coastal Command amounted to 298 aircraft, most unsuitable for maritime operations. Within a month, that had risen to 39 squadrons and 612 aircraft but they were made of 11 types, causing training and conversion problems.

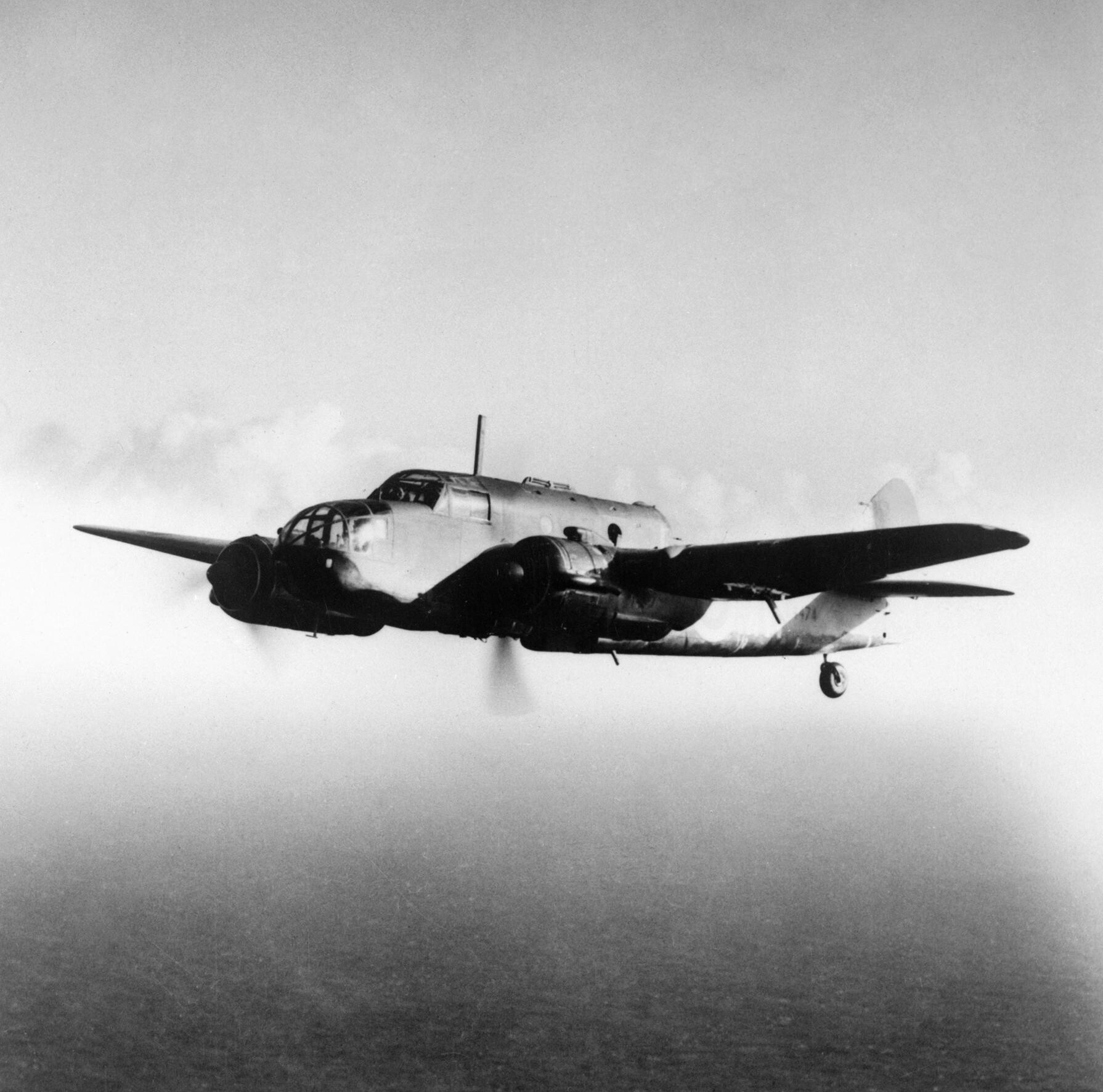
A Coastal Command Bristol Beaufort on patrol, 1940

By 1 December 1941 the situation was improving. Some 18 Consolidated Catalinas, nine Sunderlands, 20 Armstrong Whitworth Whitley and 170 American Hudsons. The Command's strike aircraft consisted of 60 Bristol Beaufort and 40 Bristol Beaufighters and 60 Blenheim fighter versions for a total of 397 aircraft in 18 squadrons. By June 1942 this figure increased 496 aircraft. Philip Joubert de la Ferté, the commander-in-chief (CinC) of Coastal Command, was not satisfied. He believed the command was short of three land-based and ten flying-boat squadrons. He refuted the Air Ministry's assertions that Coastal Command, in terms of suitable aircraft, was "comparatively well off".

After Arthur Harris' appointment as CinC Bomber Command, the situation declined. Harris, since his days as a group captain at the Air Ministry's strategic planning division, had attacked the use of resources in maritime aviation, suggesting that bombing enemy shipyards and port facilities would solve the threat to trade defence. By November 1942, 259 Hudsons were available, but were shared by other services. The Whitley and Hampden were too vulnerable to operate near enemy coastlines without heavy fighter escort. Beaufort squadrons were sent to the Middle East to operate over the Balkans and North Africa. The highly successful de Havilland Mosquito was sought after, but priority was given to the other two air commands. By February 1943, the then CinC Coastal Command John Slessor, had some 850 aircraft, but in respect of quality he was not impressed. Slessor continually wrote to the Air Ministry, complaining that Mosquitoes were being used as reconnaissance machines, while over 200 were being used by the RAF tactical air forces supporting the army, and merchant shipping was suffering high losses in the Atlantic. His successor Sholto Douglas' written records indicate the desire to upgrade, rather than produce new aircraft. By his tenure, January 1944, ten squadrons of Consolidated Liberators, five Vickers Wellingtons squadrons equipped with the Leigh light, and two Handley Page Halifax, Hudson, and Boeing Fortress squadrons were available. Among other technological developments, these long-range aircraft helped defeat the U-boats in May 1943.

=== Official requirements ===
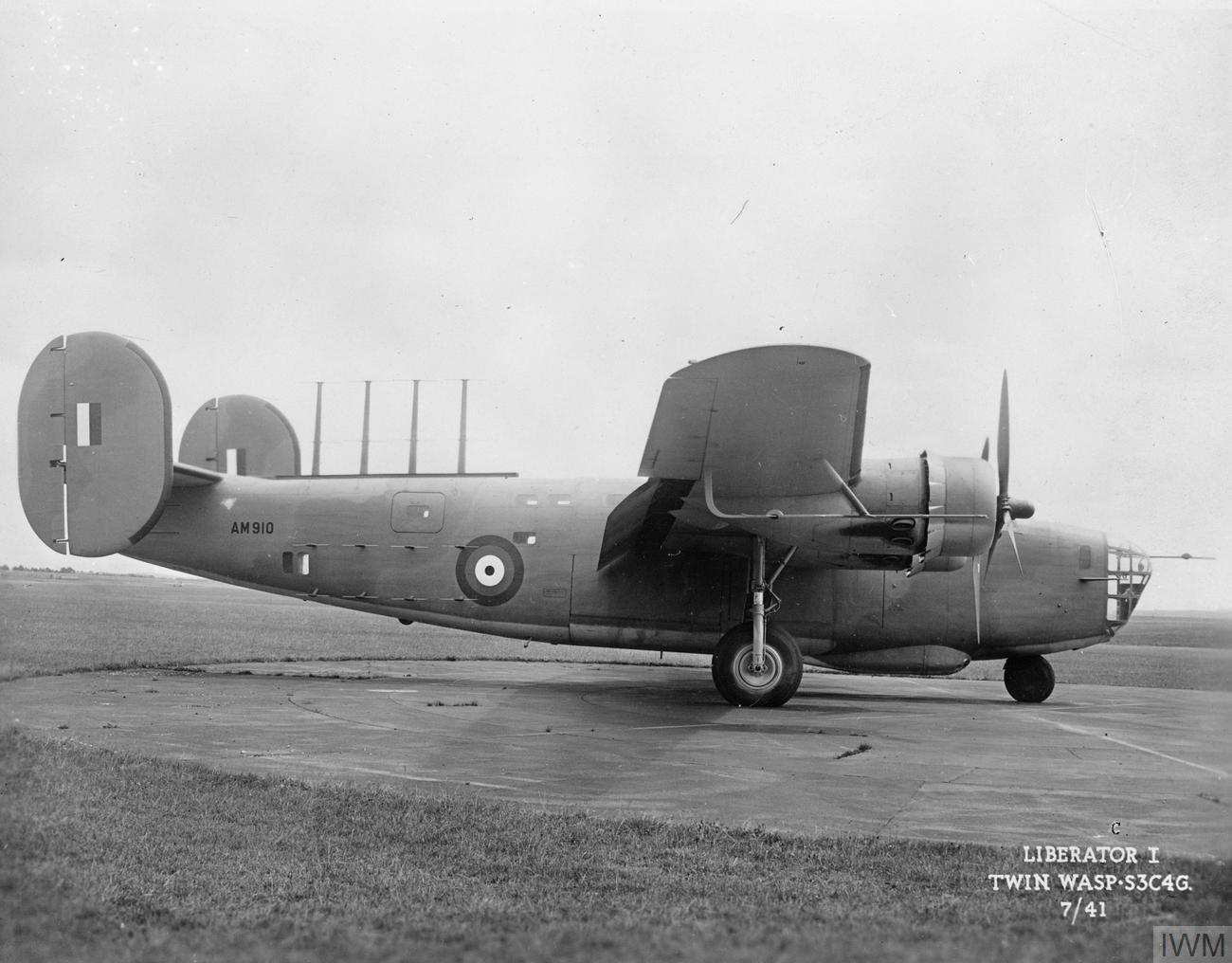
Liberator Mark I, following conversion in 1941 as an anti-submarine aircraft

Until the fall of France in 1940, the function of Coastal Command and its aircraft was to cover the English Channel, North Sea and Western Approaches. But the fall of Western Europe and Norway resulted in a vast hostile coastline from the North Cape to the Bay of Biscay. The entry of Italy into the war extended that threat to the Mediterranean. The Irish Sea covering the British western ports required a further three flying-boat squadrons. In total, a further 200 long-range aircraft were needed. The Blackburn Botha was unsuitable and the Anson and Hudson were expected to act as interim solutions. The Anson in particular had limited range and did not possess the capacity to carry heavy weaponry needed to sink a submarine.

Towards the autumn of 1941, U-boats began operating further into the Atlantic. Coastal Command's requirement programme was 150 Catalinas and 76 Sunderlands for 26 flying-boat units; 32 Liberators and 32 Wellingtons or Whitleys to equip four long-range GR squadrons; 64 Mosquitoes and 180 GR Hudsons for 15 medium to long-range units; 128 Beauforts for eight torpedo-bomber squadrons; and 160 Beaufighters for 10 long-range fighter squadrons. However, four flying-boats and two GR short-range squadrons were to be sent to West Africa, and another three flying-boat squadrons were for Gibraltar.

By December 1941 operational requirements necessitated aircraft with an extra-long-range of 2,000 miles as U-boats were operating 700 miles from the British Isles. If patrols were deployed 350–600 miles covering port approaches, the enemy would move to the 600–700 mile area and out of range. By then ASV (air-to-surface-vessel) radar homing had been developed, and aircraft were being developed with all-weather and short-take off capabilities. Priority went to Coastal Command Anti-submarine warfare, units by this time. (Anti-submarine warfare was then denoted "A/S" but since been denoted "ASW")

In January 1942 it was decided that the limit of long-range aircraft endurance should be the crew's limits, (due to extreme aircrew fatigue seriously affecting efficiency) not the fuel supply of the aircraft. De la Ferté decided, on 7 January, sorties should not exceed 14 hours, which reduced flying hours by four per mission. This was despite the entry of the very long-range Liberators in June 1941. The Liberator Mk I had a stated Air Ministry range of 2,720 miles, but crew endurance methods now meant it would be airborne for just 2,240. De la Ferté wrote to the Ministry arguing the Liberator should be used for reconnaissance work, rather than bomb load for the solitary squadron being accepted at that time. The Liberator would assist in closing the 'Mid-Atlantic Gap' which U-boats could operate in without worrying about air interdiction. After replacing Bowhill in 1941, de la Ferté had issued a directive on 12 June 1941 to use Wellingtons and Whitleys as an interim solution to unrestricted submarine warfare now practised by the Germans. Their uneconomical operational cost meant immediate replacement of these medium-range machines was pressing. Some Avro Lancasters and Halifaxes, with some difficulty, were seconded from Bomber Command.

The Lancaster was denied as a large-scale or long-term replacement. The Chief of the Air Staff, Portal, argued it was the only aircraft capable of carrying an 8,000 lb bomb to Berlin and could not be spared. As a result, the RAF official history does not include the Lancaster as a Coastal Command aircraft. With a range of 2,350 miles it could have been invaluable. The Boeing Fortress was given to the service only because the Air Ministry considered it unfit as a heavy bomber. It issued a directive on 27 January 1942 stating all Fortresses were to given over to Coastal Command for A/S operations. No. 59 Squadron RAF, No. 206 Squadron RAF and No. 220 Squadron RAF all used the Fortress as successful reconnaissance aircraft. However, the bulk of the force by early 1942 was still medium-range aircraft, which could now reach only 600 miles into the Atlantic. U-boats were now operating at 700 miles plus.

De la Ferté pushed his case hard to Portal to get the resources needed for the spring, 1942. Portal had accepted that production of Sunderlands was "disappointing" and it had only just met wastage of the existing five squadrons. Portal also admitted a complete "lack of interest on the part of all concerned". Portal insisted he would emphasis the Command's case. But by February 1942, the expected rate of new Catalina aircraft, which the command expected at a rate of three per week, with a final six to complete a batch of 30 before May, were offset by the move of three Catalina squadrons overseas (No. 209, 240 and 413 squadrons).

The situation continued in the same way throughout 1942. By March, the few suitable aircraft in operational service were not serviceable most of the time. By 15 January 1942, de la Ferté knew just one-fifth of his aircraft were operational. The situation slowly improved throughout the year despite mounting convoy losses and resistance from Bomber Command. By the time Slessor succeeded de la Ferté as AOC-in-C, he identified 60 squadrons with a total of 850 aircraft, of which 34 were A/S squadrons, operating 450 machines. Slessor felt the Catalina was too vulnerable to U-boat flak and the "prima donnas", namely the Liberator with its long range, were not available in sufficient numbers. On 18 June 1942 the War Cabinet was told that Coastal Command had only 39 Liberators. When it became obvious that the losses to U-boats were becoming unacceptable in March 1943, Coastal Command was finally given sufficient resources it needed.

=== Anti-submarine bomb ===
In September 1939, as with most other aspects of A/S, no clear plan existed for the armament of Coastal Command's aircraft. While operational control was given to the Admiralty, the faith of both services in ASDIC proved ill-founded. It ruled out the submarine threat, and caused a refocusing on surface attacks. In addition, no A/S weapons had been developed properly in the inter-war period. Most of the munitions were left over from the First World War, due in part to a wish to economise and the fact no order had been given to dispose of them.

The primary weapon against the U-boats in a future conflict was to be the 100 lb (45 kg) anti-submarine bomb (ASB). It was developed in 1926 following a 1925 Admiralty request. Trials were undertaken in 1927. Inexplicably, although the weapon was introduced and ready for testing in 1931, not a single test was carried out against any submarines or to determine the bomb's behaviour under water. The Air Ministry preferred 250 lb (110 kg) and 500 lb (230 kg) bombs, which were unacceptable to the Admiralty, due to corrosion issues in salt water, possible due to the ammonium nitrate fillings. Nevertheless, a trial order of 50 was placed in May 1939. The 100 lb (45 kg) A/S bomb proved useless. The aircraft available could only carry two, and even if they scored direct hits, little damage was done.

=== Depth charges ===
Depth charges (DCs) were more promising. Only flying boats were able to carry the 450 lb (200 kg) DC in service in 1939. It could be dropped from low altitude which was an advantage considering no suitable bomb sight was available. On 16 August 1940 Captain Ruck-Keene suggested DCs should be standard armament for A/S aircraft which the Admiralty accepted. Captain D. V. Peyton-Ward suggested on 8 September all convoy escorting aircraft should be armed with DCs.

The 450 lb (200 kg) DC was modified for use with nose and tail fairings for safe usage, in case the aircraft had to ditch, the DC would not explode. It had a hydrostatic pistol which meant it would explode at 50 ft (15 m) or more. (This was later found to be too deep.) Other weapons, such as the 250 lb (110 kg) depth bomb, exploded on contact and was likely to porpoise. 450 lb (200 kg) DCs were standard until September 1941 but were dangerous for use with aircraft that could not confirm accurate heights. At night, 250 lb (110 kg) DCs were used instead. The 250 lb (110 kg) weapon was cleared for use on 23 January 1941 and by May tests revealed the tail fin had improved the accuracy of the charge when dropped from any height up to 250 ft (76 m). The fins made less impact when dropped above this height. According to some claims, the 250 lb (110 kg) DC had to be within 9–33 ft (2.7–10.1 m) to be lethal; operational records show the lethal radius was 19 ft (5.8 m). The depth setting and detonation problems were solved by June 1942 and the 250 lb (110 kg) DC proved a formidable A/S weapon. The pistols with a 32 ft (9.8 m) setting were available and Torpex-filled weapons were now in circulation.

In January 1945, depth charges were further improved and settings of 16–24 ft (4.9–7.3 m), with a mean depth of 19 ft (5.8 m), were achieved. Operational research by Peyton-Ward improved weaponry. Interviewing crews he was responsible for implementing the Type 13 pistol which offered depth settings as shallow as 26–30 ft (7.9–9.1 m). Ward also developed the 'total release' tactic, dropping the entire load at once, to ensure maximum chance of a kill.

On 31 March 1942, de la Ferté advised the Anti-submarine Committee using both 500 lb (230 kg) and 250 lb (110 kg) DCs was not satisfactory. It was more efficient to release a large stick of 250 lb (110 kg) DCs as the required lethal stick was four times the bombing error in range. The 250 lb (110 kg) Mark VIII was not cleared for heights above 150 ft (46 m) or speeds of 150 kn (280 km/h; 170 mph), and de la Ferté hoped for a DC filled with Torpex that could be dropped at 200 kn (370 km/h; 230 mph) from 5,000 ft (1,500 m). The Director of Operational Research Office came up with a 600 lb (270 kg) DC that could be dropped from 5,000 ft (1,500 m), but the Army and Navy received priority. By 5 June 1943, the new type was in service, and developments continued in exploder technology from August 1943 to December 1944. It was found it could be released at any height between 12,000–5,000 ft (3,700–1,500 m), at any speed, with spacings greater than 80 ft (24 m). However, it came too late to effect A/S operations, and the 250 lb (110 kg) DC remained the standard type. The 250 lb (110 kg) Mark IX DC with Torpex filling dropped in sticks of four to eight, anywhere from "point-blank altitude" and within 150 ft (46 m) of the target, proved decisive. Despite the 25 lb (11 kg) solid-head rockets, the 600 lb (270 kg) ASB, and the 40mm cannon, none, in the opinion of Slessor, compared with the Mark XI depth charge.

=== Machine guns and cannon ===
In March the first British-made Browning machine guns were delivered to coastal aircraft units. The Browning and Vickers Gas Operated (VGO) .303 in (7.7 mm) machine guns became the standard weapon. The VGO fired at a rate of 900 rounds per minute, the Browning at 1,030. The Vickers was pan fed, and could jam, but the belt-fed Browning was trouble free. Gun armament had to be reviewed as its weight curtailed range. On 21 October 1942, two forward-firing .303 in (7.7 mm) guns with enough ammunition for a 15-second burst weighed 400 lb (180 kg). Single .50 in (13 mm) machine guns were considered, but dropped; two guns increased the weight to 690 lb (310 kg). Enemy submarines and aircraft typically fired 20mm cannon and ranged up to 1,000 yd (910 m), while .303 in (7.7 mm) machine guns had a range of only 400 yd (370 m). Some RAAF units used .50 in (13 mm) guns and increased the number on Sunderlands from seven to 18 to ward off air attack and suppress U-boat flak.

In 1937, experiments on Hispano-Suiza HS.404 cannons took place. Cannons were used for defence in the rear of the aircraft but were not successful in the Hudson. 40 mm (1.6 in) cannons were tested in 1939—most likely by Vickers S prototypes. Operational research documents explain that the weight, ammunition loads, and the fact the weapon fired too few rounds before components were worn out, contributed to the abandonment of its use. Instead, the cannons were given to anti-shipping wings, such as the Beaufighters which proved successful. De Havilland Mosquitos fitted with a Molins "6-pounder Class M" cannon, a modification of the QF 6-pounder anti-tank gun proved a hugely successful maritime strike aircraft.

=== Torpedoes ===
Torpedo capability was always considered paramount. The lack of suitable aircraft and shortage of the weapon itself resulted in the strike arm of Coastal Command being severely handicapped. As late as 10 December 1941 the torpedo resources were given to the Fleet Air Arm (FAA) which would receive 75 percent of all torpedoes. Torpedoes were sensitive and highly costly in production terms. The weather conditions off enemy coasts made their use more complicated and the depth of the water was considered too shallow. It was also uneconomical to use the weapon against low-tonnage shipping, Coastal Command's main target. Aside from that, the Beaufort torpedo-bomber was being posted overseas from August 1941 onwards.

On 11 June 1942, a report from the ORS stated that maritime strike sorties should carry bombs rather than torpedoes as their main weapon. It was believed they were more effective, particularly if the new Mark XIV bombsight was available. A similar conclusion was made about the buoyant bomb which could not be used properly without the Mark XIV bombsight. The need for intensive training, a lack of aircraft, priority being given to the Navy, and production limitations for low-level bomb sights; all these factors influenced the policy on torpedo usage.

During July, August and September 1941 trials were undertaken with Catalinas using Mark I and Mark II torpedoes of the British 18 inch torpedo series. It was suggested that a Mark XII could be used, although the speed of flight had to be reduced to 103 mph (166 km/h; 90 kn) at 35 feet. Without reliable altimeter to give the correct altitude, this was dangerous work as it made the Catalina an easy target for enemy flak.

The Mark 24 Mine (FIDO) was an acoustic homing torpedo to be used after the dropping of DC loads. The first success with this weapon was soon after its introduction, when it was used in the sinking of U-388 on 20 June 1943. A few days later, another was sunk. Publicity was lacking. Even the pilot was unable to see the weapons with their own eyes such was the secrecy surrounding them.

=== Rockets ===
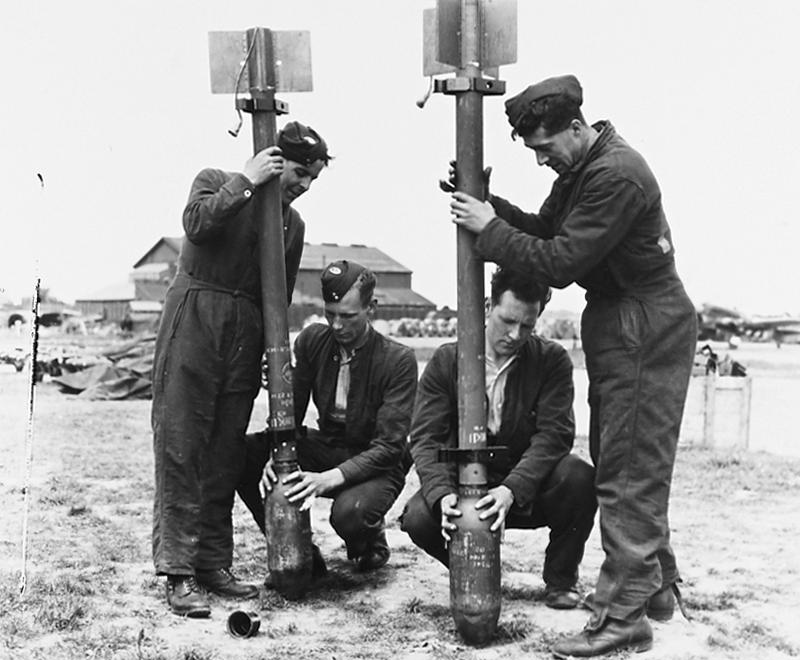
Attaching 60-pdr SAP warheads onto 3 in rocket projectile bodies

Rocket projectiles were developed during the Second World War. In the case of Coastal Command, they were to be used in A/S and as maritime strike weapons. For aircraft use there were two different types of head: a 60 lb one with high explosive and a 25 lb armour-piercing head of steel – known as the 'Rocket Spear'. Groups of four rockets were arranged on under-wing racks. Trials began in November 1942 and ended in February 1943 in respect of A/S. The firing range against U-boats was considered to be 1,000 yd (910 m) or less and could be fired in pairs or all together in a single salvo. The first recorded success was No. 48 Squadron's sinking of U-594 on 4 June 1943. The rockets tended to follow the line of flight of the aircraft rather than the line of sight. Tests indicated a 30 percent hit rate. However, just one hit was lethal to a U-boat. Though effective against U-boats, the later DCs were favoured.

=== Bombsights ===
Following the production of the 600 lb depth bomb, a Mark III angular-velocity, low-level bombsight was developed. At the eighth meeting of the Anti-Submarine Committee, chaired by de la Ferté, on 16 December 1942 at H.Q. Coastal Command, they examined ORU reports of the results with the device. No. 59 Squadron had been given the task of testing the sight and were operating the Liberator MkIII during the period that the results were gathered. AOC Wing Commander G.C.C Bartlett and Pilot Officer H.R. Longmuir (Bomber Leader) presented the following report to the committee:

Thirty-four bombs were dropped by three aimers (P/O H.R. Longmuir, F/O G.W. LaForme & F/O F.W.W. Cole) at a stationary target, and later on a target towed at 8 knots [9.2mph]. For [a total of] forty-two bombs the average range error was 18yd [yards].

However, it was considered the low-level sight's chief advantages would be demonstrated under operational conditions. The sight was considered a great advancement on any previous method of low-level bombing, either by eye or with a bombsight. The best figures from No. 59 Squadron's trials were 6 yd range error with release from 800 ft, and 5 yd error when approaching at 100 ft, but releasing from 400 ft with the aircraft's nose slightly up. Some academics in the ORS stated a 20 yd error range existed but maintained the Mark III was promising. Some crews did not trust the device, which was the case when asked to use equipment of which they had little experience. Instead, many continued relying on their own trusted eyesight. A continued lack of resources meant there was no widespread use of the sights. In later months, the aircrew changed tactics and with new weapons, they decided that it would take too long to zero-in on a target using the device. Pilots and crew often opted to use their own judgement by direct sighting with considerable success.

=== Sensors ===
Magnetic Anomaly Detection (MAD) was used to detect submerged U-boats. It consisted of a sensitive magnetometer installed in the cone of the aircraft (mostly Catalinas) that could detect anomalies in the Earth's magnetic field within a range of 400 feet and was sensitive to detect a submarine to within a few feet. The mine was used in conjunction with a 65.5 lb retro bomb. It was filled with 25 lb of Torpex and the weapon was rocket propelled backwards to the line of flight at a speed that counteracted the aircraft's forward motion. It was released rearwards from rails on the wings of the aircraft. Thus, with the aircraft's forward motion cancelled-out by the rocket motor, the device fell directly onto the target. the bomb possessed two advantages over depth charges; no depth setting was required and the opponent was unaware of the attack if no hits were made.

In July 1942 the U-boats became aware of Coastal Command aircraft using another innovation – sonobuoys, which were thought of as the air equivalent of the Navy's ASDIC. A U-boat reported them on 29 July being dropped in the north transit area, and they were thought by the enemy to be devices for preventing U-boats from travelling on the surface. They were for detecting submerged U-boats, and were used by No. 210 Squadron, operating Sunderlands. In operational records they were coded High Tea. Most crews were unaware of their existence. The devices stayed in use until 1998, when some wartime crews saw them for the first time. Until then the RAF had kept them secret.

In May 1943 Mark II ASV (Air-to-surface-vessel) was still in use but by then German Metox receivers could detect the 1.5m radiations. A variable condenser was installed as an interim solution to reduce the strength of the signal. This gave U-boats the impression the aircraft was moving away from it. There was a radical change in 1943 when ASV Mark III was becoming available. Based on Bomber Command's H2S, it transmitted a much shorter wavelength of 9.1 cm instead of 1.5m as with Mark Is and IIs and could not be detected by Metox. Instead of fixed aerials there was a rotary scanner, and thus the return signals gave a visual trace through 360 degrees on a CRT known as the Plan Position Indicator (PPI). The Mark II would only cover a forward arc, unlike the Mark III. The Mark III would indicate surface vessels via a dot on the screen while the coast would be given in the shape of an outline. Targets remained visible on the screen to within a quarter of a mile. The Mark III also suffered much less from 'sea return' obscuring targets at short range.

== Training ==
=== Early years ===
During the 1920s and 1930s the only fully trained crews were pilots, other crew members being volunteers from skilled ground trades who underwent short courses in gunnery and bomb aiming. Pilots were responsible for navigation, and when accurate navigation was essential, a second pilot was carried. Early in 1936 the Air Navigation School had been formed at RAF Manston to take over this training for all pilots destined for Coastal and Bomber Commands. Conversion training for Flying Boats was also given there.

From the start of the war to mid-1941, Coastal Command had only one functioning Operational Training Unit (OTU). Officially it had to provide training for 17 units. The pressure on the OTU was such that it offered little more than a conversion programme for pilots and crews hoping to man land-based aircraft. In 1940, Bomber Command was asked to support Coastal forces, even though at that time in the war it overstretched itself. Requests to the Air Ministry to meet outstanding OTU requirements were largely ignored. The single landplane OTU was established to train 1.1 crews per month. This figure, on the outbreak of war, proved grossly inadequate.

OTU squadrons, according to Air Chief Marshal Bowhill, should have been prepared to deliver an output of three crews per month for torpedo and fighter squadrons and two for General Reconnaissance units. Only at this point did the Air Ministry revise its policy. They did so, however, in a manner which indicated it still did not appreciate the problems of the Command. Bomber Command had received several months of 'working up' and breathing space from the declaration of war to the German invasion of Western Europe, but Coastal Command had not. Furthermore, Bomber Command was given permission to merge several new squadrons into OTUs. It seemed as if Bomber Command was still receiving better treatment.

For torpedo training it was even more difficult. Shallow water was needed to recover training duds. Torpedoes usually sank by 20 to 50 feet before making their run. Thorney Island was selected but then quickly ruled out as a useful site. It was later used, but at the time, its location near Portsmouth was considered too near the English Channel and as a result Turnberry in south-west Scotland was selected instead with Fighter Command giving up the site to Coastal Command. These Torpedo Training Units (TTU) were formed in January 1943. Training in this regard enabled the Command to cope with increasing demands for trained aircrews.

The Air Ministry was unsympathetic to Coastal Command and the lack of any suitable place for aerodromes made improvements difficult to implement. OTU airfields required a number of features not available in all locations. The main requirement was a quiet area so that OTU flights would not interfere with stations that were already operational. To prevent losses to enemy air attacks, it was also necessary to keep OTUs as far away from enemy airspace as possible, while the sensitive airspace over convoy routes and near Scapa Flow were also inappropriate places to launch OTUs.

By late 1940 there were severe shortages of pilots and Wireless operators/gunners, with 100 pilots and 200 other personnel required. In the short term the OTU course was reduced to get the crews out to operational commands faster. It now took no longer than a month compared with the six to eight weeks considered necessary. This reduced the number of fit pilots, and the quality of pilots overall. The number of unfit pilots was recorded at 374. To cope with the shortening of training, it had to have a well-stocked general training programme. Coastal Command did not possess such an administration. Only 24 pupils were graduating when the minimum requirement was 64. This was compensated by the removal of gunnery and bombing training and a reduction in night and formation flying. Still, Bomber Command received most of the 36,000 aircrew between 1940 and 1942. Entry requirements for crews were relaxed and the programmes found more recruits that way. Manpower was also supplemented by the Commonwealth, with Canada providing some of the 6,500 personnel sought by the Air Ministry. By the end of 1941, the operational strength of Coastal Command increased by seven squadrons.

In 1942 Coastal Command's problems did not abate. Experienced crews were siphoned off to Malta, to undertake ASO against German and Italian shipping in the Mediterranean. Hudson, Blenheim and Beaufighter squadrons had shortfalls of 69, 28 and 20 aircrews by January 1942. The leftover crews, some 75 percent, were far off the 200 operational hours considered for a pilot to be experienced. Efficiency fell among squadrons. The mixing of experienced crews and the inexperienced damaged morale and accident rates increased.

=== Mid to late war ===
By late 1942, training became sufficient in quality and the number of crews increased. For example, No. 17 Group produced 238 trained crews in August 1943, using the 1,007 aircraft available. During that year, 1,863 crews totalling some 11,482 men, were trained on 14 different types of aircraft in 255,800 hours. A combination of changed requirements and the formation of more specialist and advanced training overseas reduced the need for further expansion in 1944. The figures in 1943 proved to be the highest annual out put of trained crews in wartime. With sufficient manpower now available, four OTUs were closed in 1944. By July 1944 the 26 syllabuses increased to 38 and the course hours increased to 12 weeks and 87 hours. A/S training was soon set in two stages; conversion training taking five to six weeks and 32 day and night flying training and then an operational phase, in which another 55 hours and 30 sorties were flown in five weeks. This phase included ten flights on radar and gunnery training.

The specialised training was conducted from several schools. Anti-submarine training was provided from the Combined Anti-Submarine Training Centre at Maydown, beginning in May 1943. Air-Sea rescue schools were set up at Blackpool, equipped with Avro Ansons. Conversion units, such as No. 6 OTU, was detailed to provide conversion training for crews, who were to fly the Consolidated Liberator, Boeing Fortress and Handley Page Halifax. Training still remained below what was needed, owing to manpower requirements on the front line. It was not until October 1944, that it became widely accepted to give crews refresher training on new types of aircraft, that this practice became policy. Even so, one conversion course was all that was afforded to any crew. Increasing the training hours from 72 to 87 helped in some respects. Also, by 1945, it had become standard practice for squadron leaders to visit and help the OTUs keep pace with changes operational difficulties, by reporting back to the schools on how best the OTU establishment could serve the needs of Squadrons, through training or otherwise.

Rather than introducing any revolutionary tactical doctrine, crews gradually became more experienced and increased their effectiveness that way, while specialist training was provided when it was required. Survival rates remained mediocre, owing to the nature of long-range operations over water. However, with greater innovations, such as radar, better designed aircraft, and more potent weaponry, the crews built on their experiences and the service became an effective naval air service. (Note: Aircrew were trained in their particular categories: pilot, navigator (observer), wireless operator, and so on. All had some gunnery training. Notably lacking was training in A/S, although some specialist training was later given in ASV (air-to-surface-vessel) radar, either before joining or after arriving at a squadron. Coastal Command modified its A/S tactics with changes in U-boat tactics.)

== Western Europe ==
=== Norwegian Campaign ===
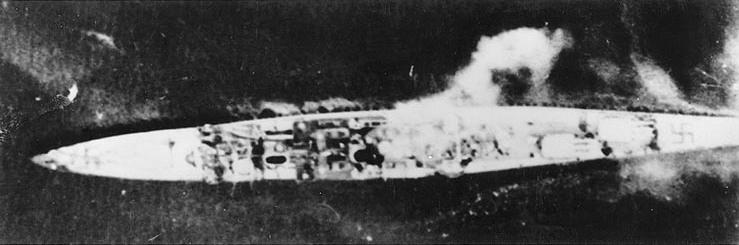
Königsberg under attack at Bergen

On 16 February 1940, No. 220 Squadron Hudsons were sent on a mission to hunt down the Altmark, a German tanker responsible for the Altmark Incident. The tanker had several hundred British prisoners of war on board. No. 233 Squadron aircraft spotted the ship entering the Jøssingfjorden, in neutral Norway. HMS Cossack was dispatched and recovered the men. On 9 April 1940 the Germans launched Operation Weserübung. Poor visibility enabled most of the German invasion fleet to evade detection until it was too late. Reconnaissance aircraft of Coastal Command had sighted and reported movements of the Scharnhorst and Gneisenau on 7 April. However, they were believed to be on exercise and not operations. They were sighted again the next day by No. 204 Squadron's Sunderlands. Coastal Command was now ordered to carry out extensive reconnaissance operations in the North Sea and around the Norwegian Coast. It was the Command's reconnaissance operations that located the German cruiser Königsberg in Bergen fjord. Blackburn Skuas of the FFA's No. 800 and 803 Squadrons sank the vessel.

On 17 April a miscommunication between Coastal Command Blenheims resulted in the loss of air support for the cruiser HMS Suffolk. It came under intense attack and was badly damaged. It was beached and recovered at Scapa Flow. On 20 April 1940 No. 233 Squadron damaged the 1,940 ton German ship Theodor in Grimstad fjord. Anti-shipping missions and bombing attacks against enemy occupied airfields were carried out by No. 224, 233 and 269 Squadrons without success. One aircraft was lost to flak. On 8 June, Scharnhorst and Gneisenau sank HMS Glorious and her two escorting destroyers. Nos. 22, 233, 224, 269 and 42 Squadrons and their Hudson, Skua, and Fairey Swordfish aircraft attempted to counter strike. Scharnhorst was repeatedly attacked but only hit twice along with an unnamed supply ship. The submarine HMS Clyde damaged Gneisenau. During the course of the attacks, eight Skuas were lost on one mission to a staffel (squadron) of Messerschmitt Bf 110s. Another four Beauforts and at least one other unidentified British type was lost to enemy aircraft and flak.

=== Netherlands, Belgium and France ===
Coastal Command had begun scouting for German shipping near the Dutch coast in spring 1940. Squadrons were working up on the Blenheim IV fighters at the time. However their preparation was short-lived. The German assault on Western Europe on 10 May 1940 changed the tempo of events. On 11 May, No. 235 Squadron was used to cover the landing of small British Army units near The Hague. Shortly after its capture, No. 22 Squadron dropped ten 500 lb bombs on Waalhaven airport, Rotterdam. No. 206 Squadron conducted armed reconnaissance along the Dutch coast and after permission was received, Nos. 220 and 233 Squadrons bombed oil storage tanks at Hamburg and Bremen on 18 May. Five Beauforts made similar attacks on Rotterdam on 29 May, which caused extensive fires. The same day, No. 22 Squadron made the first daylight anti-shipping attack on E-boats in IJmuiden harbour. No. 40 and No. 500 Squadron conducted the same kind of strikes.

During the Battle of Dunkirk, Coastal Command aircraft flew bombing missions against enemy ports and covered the evacuation effort. On 31 May 1940, Pilot Officer P. Peters and his gunner LAC Pepper of No. 500 Squadron possibly shot down Coastal Command's first air-to-air victories of the war by dispatching two Messerschmitt Bf 109s trying to intercept their Avro Anson. No. 220 Squadron shot down four Junkers Ju 87 Stukas on 1 June, while Hudsons of No. 206 Squadron managed to shoot down another two Bf 109s. However, air-to-air combat was rare for Coastal Command. Nos. 22, 812 and 815 Squadrons engaged in mining operations off Denmark, the Netherlands and Belgium. By the end of the Dunkirk evacuation on 4 June 1940, Coastal Command's No. 16 Group had flown 327 sorties in direct and indirect support of the Army and Navy.

=== Battle of Britain ===
The occupation of continental Europe and the Scandinavian North Sea coastline now meant tracking U-boats and enemy warships making for the Atlantic was now more difficult with the thin resource pool available. Assets were needed for reconnaissance, air support for Sunderlands operating in the Atlantic approaches, and anti-invasion patrol. However, any shipping of mainland Europe was likely to be hostile, which presented plenty of targets. No. 18 Group RAF continued offensive operations further north against German shipping near Norway. Its first success being the 'torching' of a German freighter near Kristiansund on 22 June by a No. 220 Squadron crew. Priority was anti-invasion operations. With the Battle of Britain underway, the Command was ordered to disrupt German preparations for Operation Sea Lion. In this respect, former RAF-Army co-operation squadrons, No. 53 and 59, were handed to Coastal Command in July 1940 for these tasks. No. 254 Squadron was supplemented with Nos. 21 and 57 Squadrons, of Bomber Command, in attacking shipping off the Norwegian coast, as result of alerts that suggested a German amphibious assault from there.

The Avro Ansons of No. 16 Group's No. 500 Squadron was fitted out with extra armour plating and side mountings for defensive guns. A free mounted 20mm was installed in the lower fuselage to offer protection. Though no evidence exists to indicate it was a success, crews appreciated the extra security. The British Cannon Manufacturing Company, impressed with the innovation, built a specialised mount for it. They began operations along with Fairey Battles of No. 12 Squadron and No. 142 Squadron, Bomber Command, operating from Eastchurch. Some conversions were made; No. 217 Squadron switched to Beauforts in May 1940, but still operated some Anson aircraft, and No. 502 Squadron received the Whitley in October 1940, a bitter disappointment for its crews.

The Beaufort was too fast for the torpedoes available, so new tactics had to be developed and the aircraft was restricted to mine-laying or bombing missions. It was soon grounded for other reasons. After No. 22 Squadron carried out more trials, it began operations on 31 August 1940. On 11 September a torpedo attack succeeded in hitting a 6,000 ton freighter. On 17 September Nos. 22, 53 and 57 Squadrons sank a 1,600 ton freighter in Cherbourg harbour. An E-boat was also destroyed and oil tanks were also set ablaze and burned uncontrollably for several days. The cost was a single Beaufort.

Other notable actions included strikes on convoys by No. 42 Squadron RAF. On 10 October it attacked heavily defended convoys off Cherbourg, Dieppe and Le Havre. A 2,500 ton German transport was sunk and one enemy fighter was destroyed, but the squadron lost 66 percent of its aircraft that embarked on the mission. No. 217 Squadron took part in attacks on Luftwaffe airfields in France, and Nos. 224, 269 and 42 Squadrons made attacks on Norwegian rail targets late in the year. Anti-barge operations were also carried out. These ships were to transport German Army units to Britain. On 13 September, they carried out another large raid on the Channel ports, sinking 80 large barges in the port of Ostend. Some 84 barges were sunk in Dunkirk after another raid on 17 September and by 19 September, almost 200 barges had been sunk.

== Battle of the Atlantic ==
=== State upon outbreak of war ===
Until late 1939, A/S work had largely been ignored. In the opening months of the trade defence war, September 1939 to early 1940, three main points arose in this respect. Firstly, the Germans were incapable of maintaining a sustained anti-shipping campaign owing to a small number of U-boats. Second, the Air Staff's fear of massed air attacks on shipping did not take place and could be discarded. Thirdly, despite the first two points, losses to Allied shipping from U-boat attack was enough for importance of A/S to increase. The Royal Navy's belief in an ASDIC equipped surface fleet to effectively sweep the seas clear of U-boats proved unfounded (owing to the limitations of ASDIC and vulnerability of surface vessels). Coastal Command aircraft had proven best able to locate U-boats, but the flawed anti-submarine bombs (ASBs) meant that they could not inflict severe damage to enemy submarines.

Losses in the North Atlantic had been just under 50,000 tons from September 1939 to June 1940. This was about to get worse, when France and the Low Countries fell in May to June 1940. U-boats could operate from French Atlantic ports, reducing their need to make the dangerous journey from ports in Norway or Germany around Scotland, and increasing their operational range in the ocean by several hundred miles. The Luftwaffe with its small, but valuable fleet of Focke-Wulf Fw 200 Condors, could now operate from the same area. From June 1940 onwards, the Battle of the Atlantic began in earnest.

=== Versus commerce raiders ===
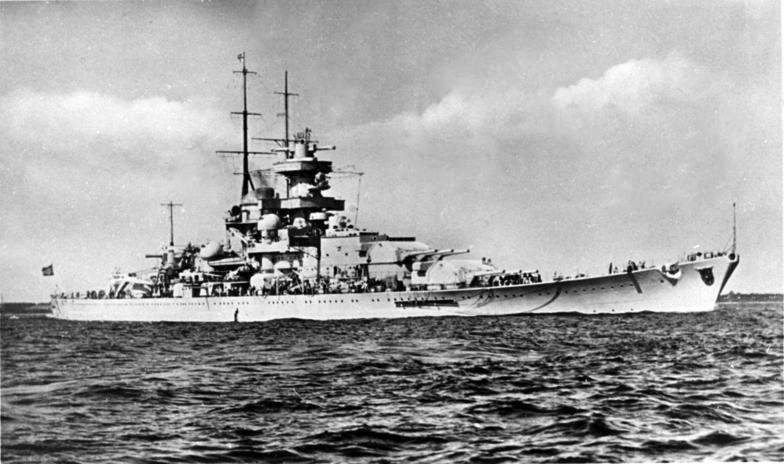
The Gneisenau. The ship was severely damaged by Coastal Command on 6 April 1941. It was put out of action for six months.

While the British proclaimed the Battle of the Atlantic open on 6 March 1941, attempts by the German Kriegsmarine to disrupt British trade routes had begun before the start of the war. The Graf Spee had slipped into the Atlantic in August 1939, and had caused significant damage in the south Atlantic, before being eliminated as a threat in Montevideo harbour, in the aftermath of the Battle of the River Plate. Other operations were mounted by Admiral Scheer and Admiral Hipper into British waters in 1940 with various success. Although Coastal Command was tasked with shadowing German surface fleets, Coastal Command had not contributed to any effective engagements fought with German commerce raiders until 1941. (Note: Coastal Command had engaged Scharnhorst in June 1940 but no effective damage was made. The first effective mission against a surface ship was by Flight Officer Kenneth Campbell VC, who severely damaged the Gneisenau on 6 April 1941.)

From 8 to 10 October 1939, Gneisenau and Scharnhorst had been spotted by Coastal Command in the North Sea. However, they were incapable of inflicting damage to the ships. When Bomber Command arrived they could not locate the vessels as they had not been trained to locate enemy vessels at sea, or attack moving targets. Coastal Command also failed to detect the break-out of Scharnhorst and Gneisenau during Operation Berlin in 1941. The German warships succeeded in sinking 22 merchant ships, although all were sailing independently. However, after their return to port, on 6 April, and being located by a reconnaissance Spitfire, Coastal Command's No. 22 Squadron, from St. Eval in Cornwall launched a strike by six Beauforts. Only one, piloted by Flying Officer Kenneth Campbell succeeded in making a torpedo-run. With 250 anti-aircraft guns, flak ships and Gneisenau's own guns, Campbell and his crew were shot down and killed, but not before the torpedo struck the ship on the stern below the waterline, putting it out of action for months. Campbell was posthumously awarded the Victoria Cross. The other members of his crew were Sergeants J.P Scott, W. Mullis, R.W Hillman.

Not long afterwards, the Kriegsmarine launched Operation Rheinübung. The Bismarck and heavy cruiser Prinz Eugen set out into the Atlantic from Norway. Their target was the Atlantic Convoys. During the later stage of the Bismarck operation, a Catalina of No. 209 Squadron RAF spotted the vessel, just 650 miles short of his destination port of Brest, France. It relayed the message to the British Fleet, enabling Fairey Swordfish aircraft to intercept. An 818 Naval Air Squadron FAA aircraft piloted by Sub-Lieutenant John Moffat hit the Bismarck with a torpedo on its stern, jamming its rudder gears, which eventually led to its sinking. Prinz Eugen had been detached prior to Bismarck's last battle. Despite her discovery by Coastal Command's aircraft further south, she escaped to Brest on 1 June. Rheinübung was the last attempt by a Kriegsmarine surface ship to break-out into the Atlantic.

One of Coastal Command's notable failures was to prevent the German Operation Cerberus from being carried out. Scharnhorst, Gneisenau, and Prinz Eugen had escaped their base at Brest, in France, and sailed for Germany through the English Channel. They succeeded without suffering major damage. Coastal Command only had one complete and one half trained squadron of Beauforts covering the area from Norway to the Bay of Biscay, or only three aircraft for every 100 mi (160 km). Intercept operations by the RAF, FAA, and Royal Navy failed, with heavy losses in aircraft.

=== Versus the Condors ===
Coastal Command was assigned to the mission of defending convoys from aerial assault also. It lacked the proper training, tactics and suitable aircraft to pose a serious threat to Luftwaffe operations until the beginning of 1942. The Luftwaffe had also neglected naval aviation. Its only suitable weapon for use in the battle of the Atlantic was the Focke-Wulf Fw 200 Condor. The Fw 200s began attacks in July 1940 from airfields in occupied France. At the time, Coastal Command had only 60 Avro Ansons, Armstrong Whitworth Whitleys, Short Sunderlands, and Lockheed Hudsons, all too slow and most too lightly armed to intercept the Fw 200. Most were also short-range. The Sunderland had the firepower and endurance, but was too slow to catch the Condor. Only one or two aircraft were sent to cover convoys as they approached Britain, as a result air-to-air combat was rare. Only five recorded actions took place. The results were two RAF aircraft destroyed (one Hudson and one Whitley) for two Luftwaffe Condors destroyed and one damaged. Between August 1940 and February 1941, Fw 200s sank 85 vessels for a claimed total of 363,000 Grt.

The entry of the Beaufighter meant Coastal Command had an aircraft capable of dealing with the Condors. Armed with four 20mm cannons in its nose and being 160 km/h (100 mph) faster than the Fw 200, it proved to be potent. On 6 April 1941 a Beaufighter shot down a Fw 200. Two more Fw 200s were damaged in 1942 by the Beaufighters and five were shot down in 1943 despite Condors making an effort to stay away from Beaufighter-escorted convoys. This became impossible as the numbers of the RAF aircraft rose. In December 1943, de Havilland Mosquitos were used en masse in the Bay of Biscay, making Condor operations "suicidal".

=== Versus the U-boats: 1939–41 ===
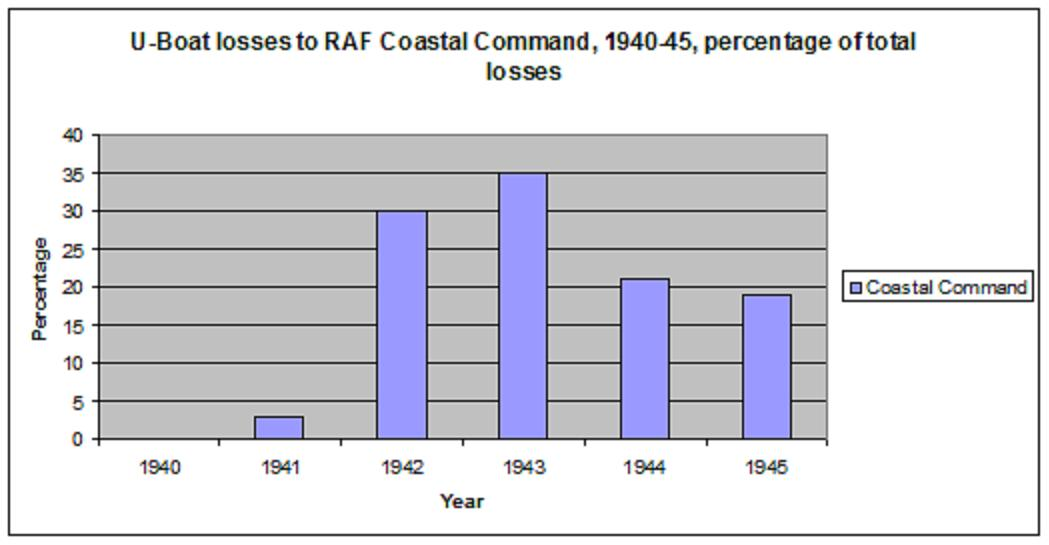
Arthur Harris had once called the service "an obstacle to victory." The statistics tell a different story. Coastal Command sank more U-boats than any other Allied service.

A/S operations in 1939 were complicated by the inadequacy of effective armament more than by lack of long-range aircraft. Until the modification of the DC to suit its use by aircraft, the Command was left with 100 and 250 lb (45 and 113 kg) bombs, which were useless against U-boats. Sinking of merchant vessels was immediate, and on 13 November 1939, a directive effectively made all sorties A/S missions. This was essential, given the sinking of 73 ships in the first two months of war. However, squadrons lacked the weapons, aircraft, and means of detecting U-boats.

Convoys from Britain lacked the surface vessel escort after 13°W. Hudsons could only make sweeps up to 17°W but lacked endurance to stay there. From Gibraltar, the lack of flying boats meant a lack of air cover after 100 miles. Nevertheless, great efforts were made with limited resources to provide cover from first to last light, the time when U-boats could use the rising and setting sun to see the silhouettes on the horizon.

However, it was more difficult in practice. The French were still a vacillating ally until the spring/summer, 1940, but the Command was still stretched by German naval forces operating from Germany, and then Norway. The Germans used surface vessels and U-boats to break-out into the Atlantic by using periods of dark, in winter, and weather conditions unfavourable to aircraft that were still without radar. Tiger Moth biplanes were used, as were civil pilots, to compensate for the lack of Hudsons. These machines were also without armament to defend from enemy fighters. It could carry 250 lb DCs, but there was no sufficient stock. Only 100 lb bombs could be used by the Anson, and they were ineffective. Crew were also insufficiently trained.

In January 1940, the U-boats opened another offensive. Some 21 submarines sank 42 ships. All were east of 11°W, and thus within range of the Command's aircraft. The situation worsened, although it was not disastrous until after the collapse of France. The need for long-range aircraft was identified by the first success of Coastal Command. A No. 228 Squadron Sunderland sighted a U-boat, German submarine U-55 (1939), unable to submerge after sinking three ships. It directed destroyers to engage it. U-55 was scuttled. Had it not been for the Sunderland, the submarine would have escaped.

In May and June, at the very western end of the English Channel, U-boats began operating effectively. Some 17 attacks were made by aircraft on the U-boats, none successful. The ASB was ordered to be replaced with the DC. No specialised aerial DCs were available. A modified 450 lb Naval DC was used. No effective tactics were available to locate U-boats. By 1940, they attacked at night, and on the surface. ASDIC was useless against surfaced submarines, and flares could not be used at the low altitude required by aircraft to make an attack. To combat this, closer co-operation by the Navy and Coastal Command was needed.

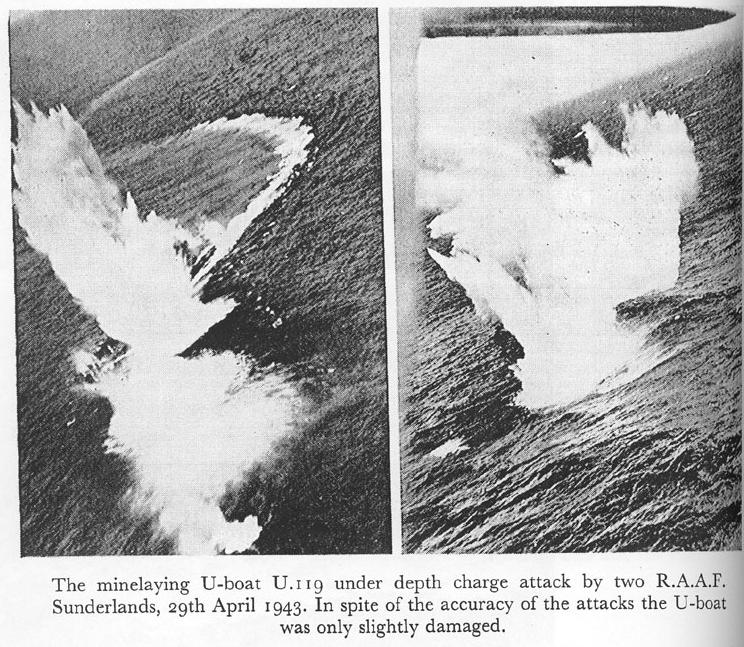
U-119, under attack from Short Sunderlands on 29 April 1943. It survived, but was sunk two months later.

Using the French ports, U-boats targeted many of their victims just east of 20°W. The services set up the ACHQ (Area Combined Headquarters) for A/S operations in the Atlantic. Organisation and inter-service was born, and became the 'nerve centre' of the Atlantic war. However, the units still required ASV, means of illuminating, and attacking targets, not to mention aircraft with endurance. The Air Ministry refused. RAF Fighter Command was to receive the priority, to make good losses from the Battle of Britain. During 1 October to 1 December 1940, 100 Allied ships were sunk. In the First Happy Time, May 1940 to 2 December 1940, the U-boats sank 298 ships for more than 1.6 million tons, almost all in the Northwest Approaches. This included 37 tankers (27 British). Most of these kills were made by 18 U-boats. This success was achieved without the help of the Luftwaffe, which had itself, failed to appreciate the importance of maritime aviation. Meaningful German convoy reconnaissance had been nonexistent.

More effective tactics had to be used if there were to be no greater resources for the Command. Two major changes adopted by Coastal Command were sweeps over convoy routes and sweeps against U-boat transit routes. According to German and Italian submarine logs, both were effective and denied them the chance of shadowing convoys on the surface. It also rapidly increased the chances of a kill. The transit tactic over the Bay of Biscay resulted in many air-to-air and air-to-submarine combats, reaching its peak in 1943. As it was, in 1940 the Command was credited with just two sinkings with Navy vessels, one sunk unaided, and two damaged. The damaged ships could have been sunk had proper weapons been available.

In 1941 the situation improved. From 1 January to 5 March 1941, 79 ships were sunk. In return, just one U-boat was damaged. But in August to December, three were sunk and another three damaged by air attack. With just 12 U-boats at sea this was a considerable achievement. DCs were being circulated to squadrons and ASV was coming online, though some crews did not believe in its ability to detect submarines. Coastal Command issued tactical instructions to enact 'full release' of DCs, spaced 60 feet apart, and set at a depth of 50 feet. Later, pistols achieved 25–32 feet depth. The spacing was later altered to 100 feet. The 'total release' was questioned. A miss could mean the exhausting of ammunition for other sightings. Aircraft like the Wellington could carry ten 250 lb (110 kg) DCs, one of which could sink a U-boat if it hit within 13 ft (4.0 m). Total release of 10 DCs would be wasteful. The aircraft were ordered to attack within 30 seconds of a sighting, as U-boats could dive in that time. Some crews attacked below the 100 foot altitude stated and had to avoid striking the submarine. The modified naval 450 lb (200 kg) DC could not be released at over 150 kn (170 mph; 280 km/h), as it broke up. The 250 lb (110 kg) DC could be dropped at speeds of 200 kn (230 mph; 370 km/h) and was very accurate. It became the standard weapon.

Along with Ultra breakthroughs, ASV also helped contain the U-boat threat in 1941. Maximum range for contact with a U-boat was 15 mi (24 km). Medium range was about 9 mi (14 km). Variable capacitors were introduced to reduce the strength of the ASV output signal to make it harder for U-boats to detect searching aircraft. By July 1941, improvements and intelligence drove U-boats some 300 mi (480 km) west, into the Atlantic, where there was less density of shipping and no air support. However, British air patrols were reduced as the enemy was now 500 miles from their bases. Aircraft density was reduced by 80 percent at 500 miles.

At this time, the Command had to formulate a new strategy to combat the U-boats. During the preceding months, the Command had contributed little to the U-boat war. It contributed to the capture of U-570, renamed Graph, and shared in three kills with naval forces. In addition, out of 245 air attacks on submarines, just 10 to 12 were damaged. de la Ferté, on taking office as AOC Coastal Command, demanded more focused effort on offensive operations against the U-boats. What de la Ferté meant by "offensive operations" was interdiction of U-boats in transit, from the U-boat pens on the French Atlantic coast into the north Atlantic:

The trunk of the Atlantic U-Boat menace, the roots being in the Biscay ports and the branches spreading far and wide, to the North Atlantic convoys, to the Caribbean, to the eastern seaboard of the North America and to the sea-lanes where the faster merchant ships sail without escort.

The Bay of Biscay was the main transit point for U-boats heading into the Atlantic. Five out of six U-boats took this route, and passed within range of RAF air bases. Coastal Command resolved to interdict these routes, from June to November 1941, and was known as the "First Bay Offensive". The offensive was ineffective. In the period, 1 September to 30 November, 3,600 flying hours were made, producing 31 sightings, 28 attacks, which possible heavily damaged only five U-boats. The only kill came on the last day of the offensive, when U-206 was sunk by a Whitley of No. 502 Squadron RAF which was guided by ASR.

=== Versus the U-boats: 1942–43 ===
In 1942 the Allies lost some 8,000,000 tons of shipping, and though they replaced 7,000,000 tons, U-boats still managed to sink 1,160 out of the 1,664 Allied ships lost. Most of these sinkings took place in the mid-Atlantic gap, well within range of long-range Sunderlands and Liberators, only the Command lacked these aircraft in quantity. Following the entry of the United States of America into the war, German U-boats had plenty of targets. Coastal Command found it difficult to maintain strength. Its units now operated from the United States, West Africa, the Mediterranean, Iceland, Russia, Gibraltar, North Africa and the Middle East. Squadrons were also sent to fight in the Pacific War.

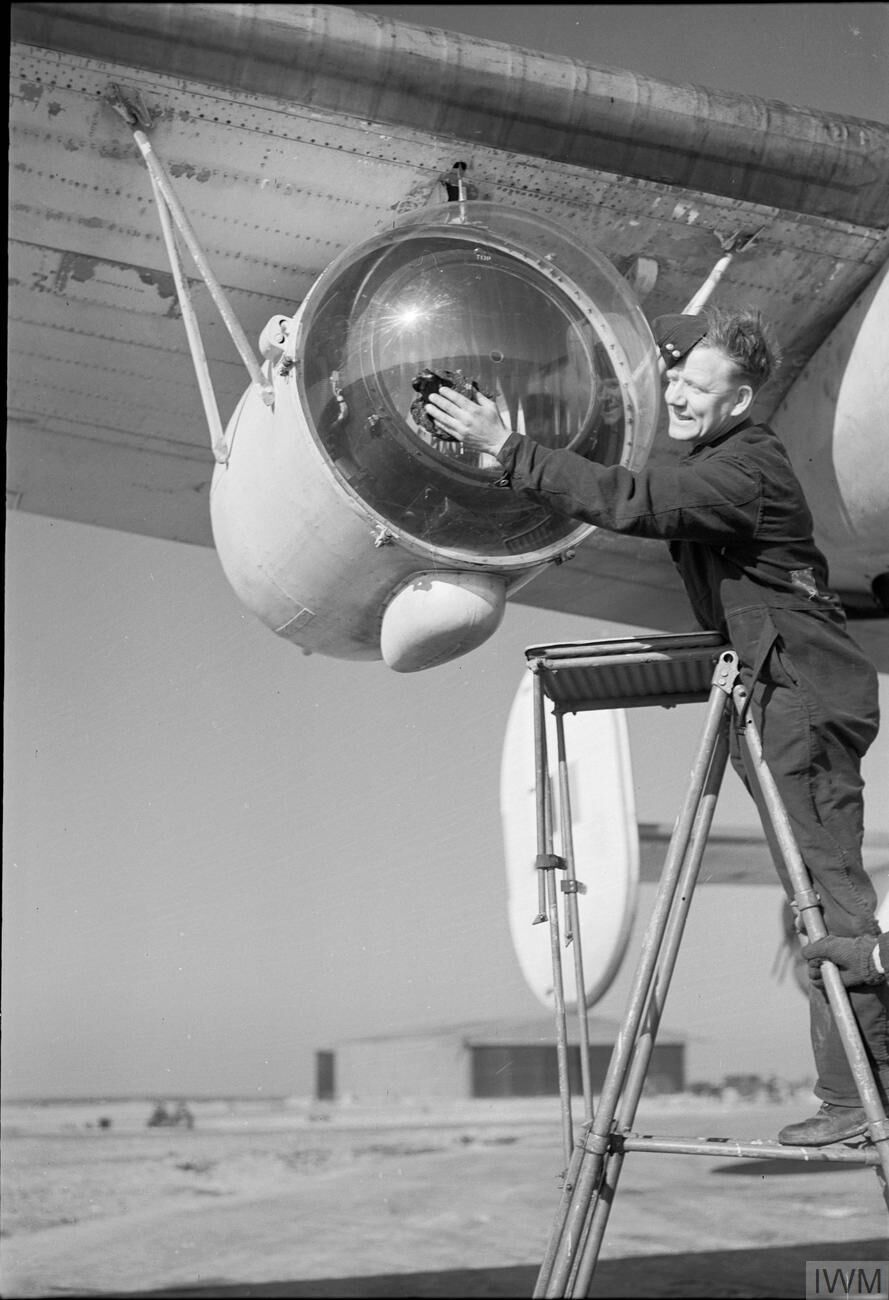
Leigh light used for spotting U-boats on the surface at night, fitted to a Liberator, 26 February 1944.

On the positive side, Coastal Command began increasing its AS efficiency. Rocket Projectiles, 250 lb DC with improved pistols for shallower depths and Leigh lights were introduced. ASV radar, despite the priority of Bomber Command, was also coming into use. On 6 July 1942 a U-boat was sunk with the help of the Leigh light. This triggered some 42 sinkings with the help of the device. The Germans provided some respite from ASV radar with the French Metox radar warning receiver. The Allies responded by reducing the signal, making it more difficult for the Germans to detect them. Later, 9.1 cm wavelength radar was introduced, overcoming U-boat countermeasures.

Coastal Command sank 27 U-boats in 1942 and damaged 18 more. Some of these kills were shared with the Navy. Bomber Command, by contrast, whose priority garnered them greater resources at the expense of Coastal Command, failed to destroy a single completed U-boat on the slip until April 1944. Arthur Harris, CinC Bomber Command, deplored the use of aircraft for defensive purposes and insisted the threat would be checked by attacking production. An indication of the effectiveness of air tactics was the fact very few Allied ships were sunk within 600 miles of British waters by late 1942. Between June 1942 to June 1943, 71 enemy submarines were sunk by the command.

In February 1943, John Slessor took over as AOC. During this time, a debate was taking place in the RAF over how best to attack U-boats and sink them in large numbers. Arthur Harris, AOC Bomber Command, and the United States Army Air Forces (USAAF), were in favour of knocking out their bases and attacking submarine construction yards. Partly this was a mark of the AOCs in the air forces, particularly Harris, who hated using 'his' bombers in what he considered to be "defensive" roles. Slessor agreed with the need to take the war to the U-boats. He preferred attacking the German vessels in the Bay of Biscay, in transit to the Atlantic. His operational tool was Air-Vice Marshal G.R Bromet's No. 19 Group. The offensive became collectively known as "The Second Bay Offensive". Operation Gondola, lasting from 4–16 February. This operation included two B-24 squadrons with SCR 517 (ASV III) radar. A total of 300 sorties were managed, 19 sightings and 8 attacks were made. Only one U-boat (U-519) was sunk by No. 2 Squadron. The US units were then abruptly moved to the Moroccan Sea Frontier, despite the protests of Slessor.

While Slessor lost some units, his ASW capability was enhanced with the arrival of H2S radar, which was used in Coastal Command's operations over the Bay and was undetectable to Metox. On the night of the 2/3 February, a Stirling bomber was shot down over Rotterdam, enabling the Germans to examine the radar and develop counter measures. They were shocked by the advanced nature of its design, which had proven their own research to be wide of the mark. Harris had won the majority of the resources for Bomber Command and used H2S. The radar was, however, used for ASW. No. 172 Squadron RAF and No. 407 Squadron RCAF had the device fitted to supplement their Leigh Lights. No. 172 attacked the first U-boat, U-333 on 5 March, but was shot down. The submarine noted the lack of warning, and sent the warning to U-boat command. However, Operation Enclose, 20–28 March 1943 achieved revenge. During this period, 41 U-boats passed through the Bay, with 26 sightings and 15 attacks. Only U-665 was sunk, by a No. 172 Squadron Wellington. Operation Enclose II, on 6 to 13 April, sighted 11 and attacked four of the 25 submarines passing through, sinking one U-boat; U-376, sunk by No. 172 Squadron. Operation Derange soon followed, and Bromet was able to deploy 70 ASV III equipped B-24s, Wellingtons, and Halifaxes. Only one U-boat (U-526), was sunk, and it was dispatched by a mine. The offensive ended on 30 April 1943. The results had been disappointing. The Command had flown 80,443 hours, lost 170 aircraft, sunk 10 submarines, and damaged 24.

While the Bay Offensive had failed in the spring, in the mid-Atlantic, a turn in fortunes was experienced by Coastal Command. In 1943, the Command received the long-range aircraft it needed. The Liberator and increased numbers of British types, including the Halifax and Lancaster bomber, in part, were diverted to Coastal Command to deal with the U-boat threat in March. In May the Command sighted 202 U-boats and attacked 128. The Command lost heavily during this period, but it succeeded in inflicting a decisive defeat on the U-boats. Moreover, German blockade runners were prevented from carrying their cargo to Germany-held ports in France. During May 1943 the commander of No. 58 Squadron RAF, Wing Commander Wilfrid Oulton, flying a Halifax, himself participated in the sinking of three U-boats in the Bay of Biscay. He attacked and sank U-663 on 7 May, then U-463 on 15 May. On 31 May, he shared in the sinking of U-563 with aircraft of No. 228 Squadron RAF and No. 10 Squadron RAAF.

During the year 1943, U-boat losses amounted to 258 to all causes. Of this total, 90 were sunk by Coastal Command, and 51 damaged. Up until that time, in May 1943, Coastal Command had sighted submarines on 825 occasions, which resulted in 607 attacks. Only 27 were sunk, and three were shared destroyed. Another 120 were damaged. Against those figures, 233 aircraft, 116 of which were lost owing to weather conditions, were destroyed. Of this figure, 179 were from No. 19 Group RAF, attacking U-boats over the Bay of Biscay.

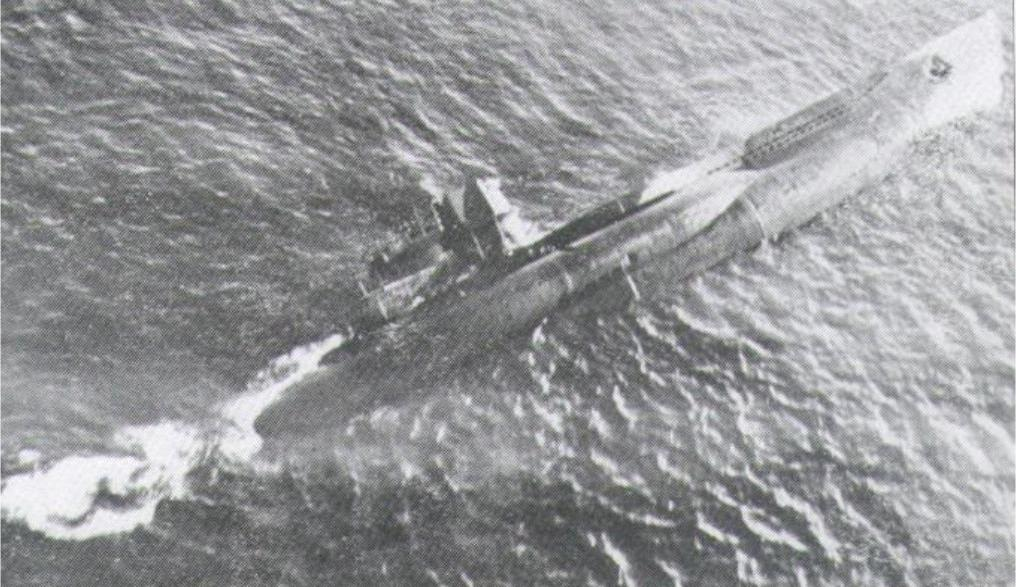
U-617, a German Type VIIC submarine, was damaged by Leigh Light Vickers Wellingtons from No. 179 Squadron RAF, on 12 September 1943. It was scuttled by Royal Navy soon after.

The defeat of the U-boats in the mid-Atlantic and their withdrawal, meant the Bay of Biscay became congested with German submarines seeking refuge. Thus, AOC Slessor revisited the interdiction strategy which had been tried, and failed in 1941 and 1943. This time, there were crucial differences. Firstly, the improvement of radar had enhanced detection of submarines, submerged and surfaced, and intelligence breakthroughs, in which the British Ultra organisation had broken the naval Enigma codes and confirmed a major change in German strategy, enabled the British to focus on the Biscay.

When renewed air operations began over the Bay, the Command found U-boats not only adhering to a new strategy (of avoidance), they discovered the Germans obeying new tactical instructions. The German crews were ordered to transit the Bay in groups, submerged, and at night, but on the surface in daylight, to concentrate their defensive fire. Later U-boat designs had their firepower upgraded for this purpose. Also, the Luftwaffe provided Junkers Ju 88 night fighters to escort the submarines. The increased firepower and determination of German air and submarine crews to fight it out did not deter British crews. The Third Bay Offensive became the bloodiest in the aircraft-submarine battle yet, which involved heavy losses. Despite efforts to defend themselves, by 17 June, air attacks had forced German submarines to make the trip submerged during daylight. The effects were not just indirect; patrols also inflicted increasing losses on U-boats. From 1 July to 2 August 1943, 86 submarines passed through the Bay; 55 were sighted and 16 sunk, in exchange for 14 aircraft.

The Luftwaffe made a significant effort to defend the submarines. In August, 17 aircraft and six Allied fighters were lost in aerial combat over the Bay. Dornier Do 217 and Ju 88s, equipped with Henschel Hs 293 radio-controlled glide bombs, were also used and forced Royal Navy units to abandon attacking submarines in the region. The German submarines were ordered to 'hug' the Spanish coast, which was at the limit of Coastal Command's range, and in neutral territory. (Spain was Axis friendly, so unlikely to protest.) This tactical move corrected Dönitz's earlier mistakes of allowing transit within range of Allied air bases, and the Germans regained a measure of safety in the Bay. The successes won in July 1943, had reached their peak, and would not be repeated.

=== Versus the U-boats: 1944–45 ===
The defeat of the U-boats in May 1943 did not signal the end of the Battle of the Atlantic. Some 60 vessels remained, and posed a threat to convoys. In later months, the Schnorchel became available, a device originated by the Dutch and later adopted by the Kriegsmarine after the Germans invaded the Netherlands, and capable of allowing a U-boat to replace its air supply and vent its diesel exhaust without surfacing. However, it was sensitive to the weather, and put immense pressure and strain on crews who had to remain submerged for long periods in hostile waters. Further, Coastal's Mark III radar could detect the mast. The smoke emitted was visible from 1,000 feet. In some cases the mast itself could be seen, some one foot in diameter, projecting two feet and moving at 12–15 knots. The technological response was to use High Tea, a series of sonobuoys dropped by aircraft onto the surface of the sea to detect U-boats. By late 1943, the U-bootwaffe was losing 20 percent of its strength per month. Some 70 percent that did return were seriously damaged.

Despite the end of the third and final air offensive over the Bay of Biscay, patrols continued until the liberation of France. The Bay of Biscay patrol statistics for the period 1 May to 2 August 1943, show Coastal Command had flown for 32,343 hours and lost 57 aircraft to all causes, sinking 28 U-boats and damaging 22. From 3 August 1943 to 31 May 1944, it flew 114,290 hours, losing 123 aircraft to all causes, and sinking 12 U-boats and damaging ten more.

In 1944 and 1945, U-boats became less and less effective. They remained at sea to tie down as much Allied air and sea forces as possible, to relieve pressure on the other two services (Heer and Luftwaffe). When the Allies launched Operation Overlord in June 1944, U-boats attempted to interdict shipping, but lost 24 of their number from 6–30 June. A further 12 submarines from Norway joined 35 from French ports for operations, only to suffer 50 attacks on the first day. Six returned due to damage. On 25 August 1944, owing to the Allied advance toward U-boat ports, all submarines were ordered to Norway. This evacuation from France was complete by 30 September. Between 6 June and 31 August 20 out of 30 Schnorchel boats were lost. For Coastal Command, the end of 1944 witnessed the interception of 47 percent of all sighted U-boats, which resulted in 20 percent of those attacked being sunk.

The main Allied detector at this time was the Magnetic Airborne Detector (MAD). MAD entered service in 1943, only to find its targets had vanished from coastal waters. It was able to plot and recognise distortions in Earth's magnetic field caused by submarines. It took some skill to use and worked only if it was directly above the target. It also was effective only at low altitudes. It had some success in the Gibraltar strait, but was ineffective in British waters owing to different conditions. The only recorded MAD victory in British waters was the sinking of U-1055 on 30 April 1945 off Ushant. Another invention was the American 3-cm radar and sonobuoy. These devices, along with the Mark 24 Mine (Fido), were responsible for the destruction of U-905 and U-296, sunk by No. 86 Squadron and No. 120 Squadron.

However, as the last year of the war dawned, the Germans regained some ground in the technology battle. Grand Admiral Dönitz had not yet given up hope of achieving strategic effect in the U-boat war. The Types XXI, XXII, and XXIII were becoming available, and in an attempt to impose some effect, he ordered operations in British home waters. These designs were faster, and more difficult to detect. German operations with five Type XXIIIs in British waters sank seven ships without loss, two of these on 7 May 1945. By the end of April, 12 Type XXIs had completed trials and 99 more were on trials, but only one Type XXI became operational before the surrender. Their introduction came too late. The bulk of operations were continued by older, Type VII submarines. The type suffered heavy losses to Allied aircraft, losing 23 in British waters in the last five weeks of the war. Now experiencing a "Happy Time" in reverse, submarines in the Baltic Sea lost 50 of their number, and 83 in total to Allied aircraft.

In response, German submarines flowed out of the Baltic to Norway through the mined coastal waters, close to the Swedish coast. Coastal Command's No. 16 Group and No. 18 Group had success against these submarines in April and May 1945. German crews travelled on the surface, for fear of mines, exposing them to air attack. Mosquitoes and Beaufighters from the two groups sunk several vessels. The last kill took place on 7 May 1945, when Flight Lieutenant K. Murray, flying a Catalina of No. 210 Squadron, crippled U-320. The submarine foundered two days later with all hands.

In the last three years of the war, Coastal Command sank more U-boats than any other service and continued to hold the technological advantage from 1943 onwards. A brief threat, in the shape of the German Type XXI and Type XIII emerged, too late to alter the outcome. The Allies held the technological edge from 1943 onward. Official wartime operations ceased at midnight on 4 June 1945. The last mission was flown by Wing Commander J. Barret, the commander of No. 201 Squadron. By that time over 2,000 decorations had been awarded to Coastal Command personnel. These included four Victoria Crosses, 17 George Medals, and 82 Distinguished Service Orders.

== Offensive operations: 1940–1945 ==
=== Early struggles ===
Up to the end of 1940, Coastal Command's Anti-shipping Operations (ASO) campaign against German seaborne trade in north-west European waters had claimed a direct attack on only six vessels, totalling 5,561 tons, and 14 others badly damaged. In exchange, 158 aircraft were shot down or lost to other causes; 26 for every enemy vessel. Human casualties amounted to 600 men including 46 to 50 POWs. Coastal Command's performance contrasted heavily with the service' joint mine-laying effort with Bomber Command, that sank 86 enemy vessels in the same period, (totalling 82,983 tons) and ten others damaged for the loss of just 31 aircraft. The performance of Coastal Command's strike wings was down to poor intelligence and equipment, which it was refused, in favour of diverting them to other roles.

As there was no defined anti-shipping role in pre-war plans, obtaining information on the enemy's seaborne commercial traffic did not receive high priority, and once the war started, it was difficult to establish quickly the means of acquiring this information, especially after the fall of Norway and France in April and May 1940. The extent of the intelligence vacuum at the start of Coastal Command's campaign is demonstrated by the fact that Air Ministry planners were unaware of the heavy anti-aircraft armament being fitted to enemy merchant vessels. Casualty rates, often in excess of 20 percent, clarified matters in 1940.

The failure of Coastal Command to acquire any tangible results prompted the Admiralty to complain to the Air Ministry on 5 November 1940. In December it was agreed that 15 of the planned new 100 RAF squadrons be given to Coastal Command. These were to be operational by 1941. In the interim, four aircraft were to be given to each of the squadrons to bolster their strength, while a further Beaufort fighter and Beaufort torpedo bomber squadron were also made available.

In mid-1941, just as ASO units were finding their feet, a large number of personnel and aircraft were sent to Malta (and the Desert Air Force) to interdict Erwin Rommel's Afrika Korps supplies from Italy to North Africa. Adding to the problem was a shortage of materials and testing facilities. Restocking squadrons and re-equipping them was slow. Not until 1942 did the ASO squadrons get the recognition needed, in the wake of the German Operation Cerberus. Maintenance was also poor. Each service was to maintain an operational ready rate of 70 to 75 percent. In Coastal Command it was 40, and not much higher in others at that point. Greater emphasis was made and serviceability increased.

The Operations Research Section (ORS) was also set up in light of the success of such programs in Fighter and Bomber Commands. Many scientists were appointed to the ORS Coastal Command. Some acted as advisors to Air Marshal Bowhill. Four sections were set up; planned flying and maintenance, ASO, A/S, and weather and navigation. Resources were spread evenly but A/S received more attention. The rest did not receive close attention until 1943, when the U-boats had been contained and a certain degree of ascendancy achieved.

In July 1941, Blenheims from Bomber Command's No. 2 Group joined the campaign. They claimed 104 vessels sunk and 72 damaged. Only 73 vessels totalling 178,000 tons were credited destroyed and 62 vessels, totalling 96,780 tons damaged. Intelligence in August 1941 saw this drop to 31 destroyed (73,348 tons) and 58 (148,000 tons) damaged. Post-war assessments reveal even this was over stated. Final figures were seven sunk (9,556 tons) and six (13,088) seriously damaged. The figures improved after the autumn 1941. More resources, better training and equipment including more capable strike aircraft resulted in more sinkings. By 1942, more and better aircraft and armament dramatically increased the offensive capabilities of the Command.

=== Later years ===
The Bristol Beaufort solved medium-range operational problems but long-range strikes were beyond the type. No. 2 Group RAF from Bomber Command took on anti-ship operations from March to October but their Blenheims were not suitable. The answer lay with the Bristol Beaufighter which offered a combination of speed, rugged endurance and multi-role capability with a variety of weapons. It became operational in early 1942 and made an immediate impact. In September 1942, 15 squadrons of Beaufighters were to be created by April 1943 into Strike Wings. The first came into operation in November 1942, with No. 143, 236 and 254 squadron based at North Coates. The inexperienced crews initially suffered heavy casualties for little return, the wing returned in April 1943 after being withdrawn for intensive training, with success. In May 1943 the de Havilland Mosquito joined the wing and on 22 June they began operations with rockets. One of the first Mosquito-equipped Coastal units was No. 333 (Norwegian) squadron, on 10 May. In October, Mosquito FB VIs were used and later the Mk XVIII fitted with the 57 mm Molins cannon was also used as the Mosquito 'Tsetse', and a planned larger-gunned version of the 'Tsetse' with a 3.7in anti-aircraft artillery gun modified for use as an anti-tank gun, the Ordnance QF 32 pounder, was tested in a similar manner in a Mosquito, although this did not fly until after the war. Rockets and the 57 mm Molins gun were effective, and the Command had the aircraft to begin a mass anti-ship campaign. By January 1944, German construction was not keeping pace with losses. In the period, January to April 1944, the Germans lost 38,202 tons of shipping, directly to Coastal Command. In June to August, seven vessels were sunk in Norwegian waters. The Banff Wing sank 17 vessels, totalling 23,582 tons in September to December 1944. They shared in the destruction of two and damaged ten, for a total of 10,000 tons. During this time, the Mosquitoes main weapon was the 25 lb (11 kg) rocket.

The following ASO kill account was obtained by Coastal Command aircraft:

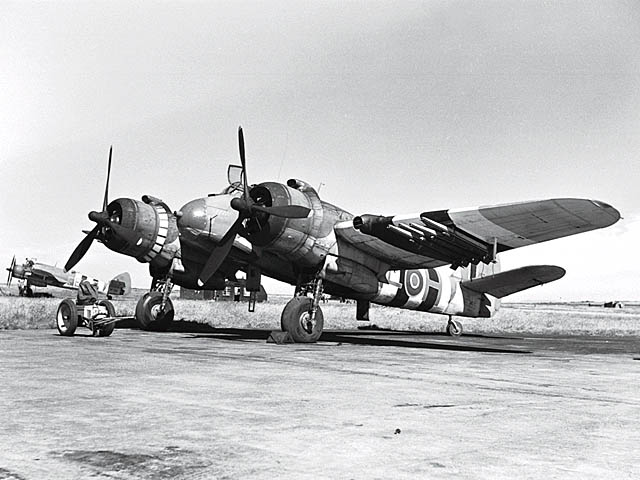
The Beaufighter Mk.X. This aircraft is NE255 / EE-H of No. 404 Squadron RCAF, Coastal Command at RAF Davidstow Moor, 21 August 1944. The type was one of the most capable torpedo aircraft for ASO. It became effective in substantial numbers in 1943.

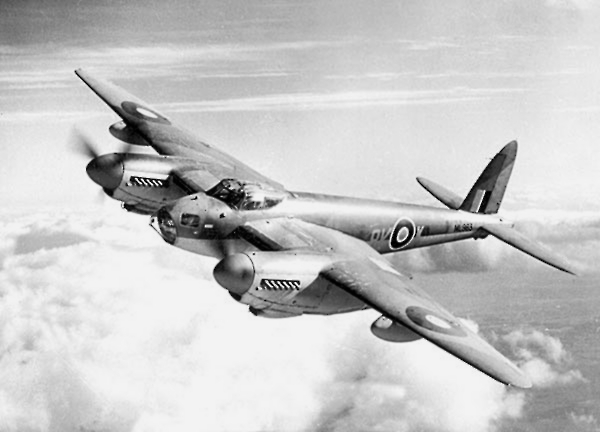
The de Havilland Mosquito was the highest ASO performer.

No. 16 Group RAF success
year	ships sunk	ships damaged	tonnage sunk	tonnage damaged
1940	2	8	2,860	32,176
1941	9	3	23,274	15,042
1942	13	5	27,139	17,559
1943	18	2	41,944	19,093
1944	99	6	80,105	15,449
1945	37	4	14,686	24,444

No. 18 Group RAF success
year	ships sunk	ships damaged	tonnage sunk	tonnage damaged
1940	4	6	2,701	15,486
1941	16	15	19,659	29,685
1942	8	6	27,349	16,075
1943	10	2	33,083	1,785
1944	42	29	68,308	98,110
1945	67	32	116,743	120,493

No. 19 Group RAF success
year	ships sunk	ships damaged	tonnage sunk	tonnage damaged
1940	0	0	0	0
1941	3	2	8,932	39,640
1942	5	9	942	48,478
1943	4	1	9,732	6,240
1944	29	4	34,779	13,699
1945	0	0	0	0

== Other theatres ==
Coastal Command played a limited part in the Mediterranean Theatre of Operations. No. 202 Squadron and No. 233 Squadron operated from Gibraltar, covering the Strait of Gibraltar and intercepting Axis submarines in transit from Europe to the Indian Ocean. The first credited sinking went to No. 202 Squadron's commanding officer Squadron Leader N.F. Eagleton. His crew crippled the Italian submarine Galileo Ferraris on 25 October 1941, allowing an escorting destroyer from Convoy HG 75 to capture the crew. They were involved in the sinking of U-74 and U-447 on 2 May and 7 May 1943, respectively as part of AHQ Gibraltar, under command of Air Commodore S.P. Simpson.

== Non-combat operations ==
=== Meteorology ===
The Meteorological Flight first came into being on 1 November 1924. Its main priority was identifying temperature, pressure, humidity and general weather conditions being logged at sea level to 18,000 feet (5,486 m). These flights were named THUM (Temperature/Humidity). Changes in air conditions usually came in the Atlantic in the west. The Meteorological Office (MET) relied on reports from ships in this regard. The need for aircraft for operations was ignored in 1939 owing to lack of aircraft. However, in June 1940, Bomber Command started to become anxious about base landing conditions and the accuracy of general forecasts. In response from strong support, No. 403 Squadron RCAF, No. 404 Squadron RCAF and No. 405 Squadron RCAF were formed for this purpose. The routes requested by the MET usually involved distances of up to 1,000 nm. Lockheed Hudson aircraft were ideal for this type of operation, but since none were available Bristol Blenheim aircraft filled the role. On 1 March 1941 Coastal Command assumed operational control of all the units. They were redesignated No. 1401 to 1406 flights. All were handed over to No. 18 Group RAF. In October 1940, two more flights, 1407 and 1408 were sent to Iceland to begin operations from there. Several types of single engine aircraft were used; Gloster Gladiators, Hawker Hurricanes and Supermarine Spitfires. Operations were conducted mostly up to 15,000 feet (4,572 m) in wartime, as the aneroid capsule altimeter was not able to give accurate readings. A Mk. 14B ICAN altimeter was used. The aircraft had to be flown at the height measured for two minutes to allow the readings to settle or stabilise.

Operational sorties from the summer of 1940 through to March 1942 were high in number. No. 1405 flight flew 291 sorties from RAF Tiree, in Scotland, covering the Atlantic Ocean west of the Faroe Islands gap. In 1943 long-range Handley Page Halifax and de Havilland Mosquito aircraft became available in increasing numbers. No. 521 Squadron RAF, equipped with Mosquito aircraft, joined the 8th Pathfinder Group as No. 1409 Flight, in March 1943. No. 518 Squadron RAF, operating with Halifax aircraft, started to conduct deep operations into the central Atlantic Ocean from Tiree, on 15 September 1943. Readings on these operations were taken every 50 nm. Sea level pressure readings were taken every 100 nm. The usual flight patterns involved a climb to 18,000 feet (5,486 m) on the return leg. It was flown 500 nm, then a slow descent to sea level followed by a return to base at 1,500 feet (457 m). Other flights were made from covering the Atlantic Ocean, Bay of Biscay, North Sea and Western Mediterranean Sea. Coastal Command covered 91 percent of the Allied MET flights between November 1943 and June 1944. Sorties over the Atlantic on 4 June 1944 contributed to the decision to launch Operation Overlord on 6 June 1944. No. 518 Squadron alone flew on 363 days of the year in 1944 in support of MET operations.

=== Rescues ===
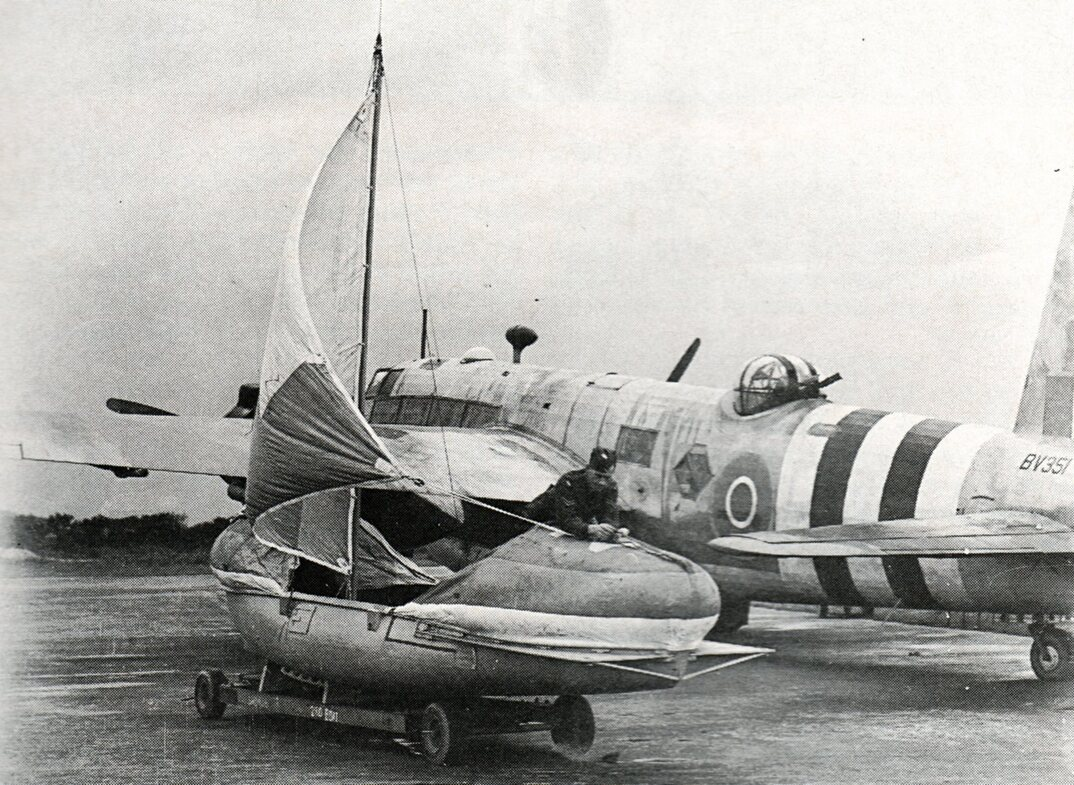
An airborne lifeboat rigged for sailing, in front of a Coastal Command Warwick with D-Day identification stripes.

Prior to the Second World War, there was no British air-sea rescue (ASR) organisation for rescuing aircrew from the sea. Instead, aircrew relied on the Royal National Lifeboat Institution (RNLI), salvage tugs, vessels in the vicinity, or if in range, the High Speed Launches (HSL) established at flying boat bases. New HSL's had been developed with a range of 500 mi (800 km) by the mid-1930s, but only seven were in service by 1938. On 14 January 1941, the first air-sea rescue was set up (the Directorate of Air Sea Rescue Services). Westland Lysanders were used to scouting the coastlines, while the Supermarine Walrus was planned to be used for long-term use. By June 1941 rescue from the seas had increased to 35 percent. The Air Ministry decided the service could do better. It was merged with another Directorate, Aircraft Safety. On 23 September 1941 Air Marshal John Salmond took over the organisation. In October 1941 No. 275 Squadron RAF and No. 278 Squadron RAF were given to ASR work. This was supported by two squadrons from Coastal Command equipped with Hudsons. No. 16 Group was authorised to create No. 279 Squadron RAF on 24 October to act as a specialised ASR squadron. No. 280 Squadron RAF was created on 28 November 1941 and was given Anson aircraft in place of Hudsons, as they were desperately needed for A/S operations. By 1942 the Mark I Airborne Lifeboat and sailable dingy were in production; these were usually jettisoned for crews in the water.

Aircraft suitability once again came in for discussion during the war. Ansons and Boulton Paul Defiants were not suitable for ASR operations. The Vickers Warwick was earmarked for the main ASR aircraft. Four 20-aircraft squadrons with specialised ASR conversion were to be made available by the spring, 1943. In May 1943, 156 men of Bomber Command were rescued from the sea by No. 279 Squadron alone. By the end of 1943 Coastal Command had rescued 1,684 aircrew out of 5,466 presumed to have ditched in the sea. On D-Day, 6 June 1944, 163 aircrew and 60 other personnel were rescued. During the month of June 1944, 355 were saved by ASR units of Coastal Command. In all, 10,663 persons were rescued by Coastal Command in ASR operations. Of this total, 5,721 were Allied aircrew, 277 enemy aircrew, and 4,665 non-aircrew.

=== Reconnaissance ===
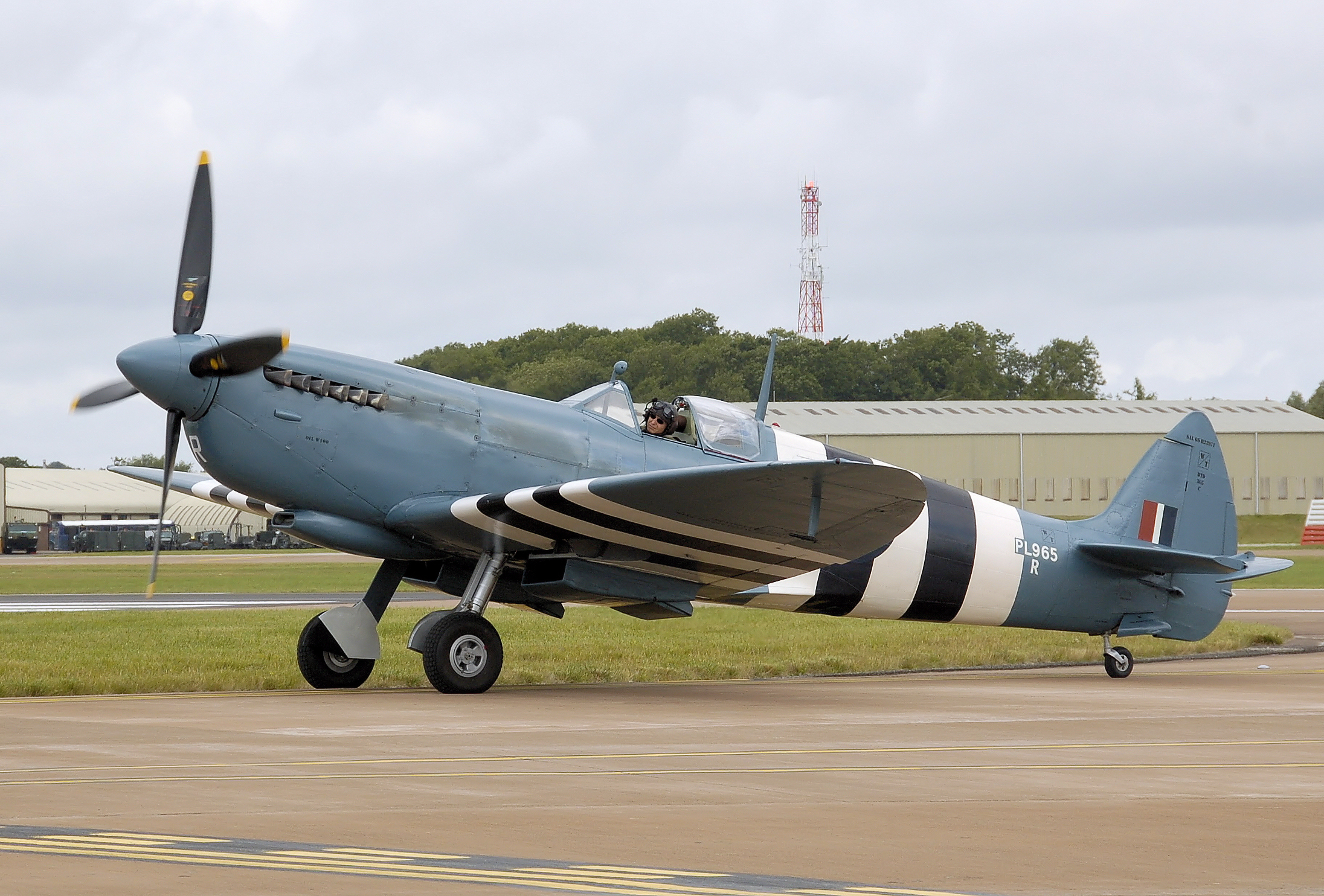
This Spitfire PR Mk XI (PL965) was built at RAF Aldermaston.

In 1936, the British Secret Intelligence Service Chief of Air Intelligence, Wing Commander F. W. Winterbotham, developed aerial photograph techniques in collaboration with the French. The task was to gather a record of German targets. By the summer, 1939, RAF Bomber Command's No. 2 Group RAF was carrying out this role. However, various problems with standard equipment led to the formation of specialist formations for this duty. One of the first squadrons to act as a PR (Photographic reconnaissance) unit was No. 212 Squadron RAF, which saw service in the campaigns in Western Europe, in May and June 1940 under Fighter Command's control. However, at the end of that campaign, the Admiralty pressed its case for the need for coastal and sea reconnaissance. With operations now over, owing to the evacuation of northern Europe by the Allies, these reconnaissance operations were given to Coastal Command on 18 June 1940. This included the Interpretation Unit, which analysed photographic evidence. The organisation was called the PRU (Photographic Reconnaissance Unit). It was administered by No. 16 Group RAF, but under the operational control of Coastal Command.

The first operations in 1940 concerned Operation Sea Lion, the planned invasion of Britain by the Wehrmacht. The unit was to receive 30 PR Supermarine Spitfire aircraft, specialised and adapted for reconnaissance use. They would be capable of 1,750 miles round trips. However, just 13 aircraft were available to the unit, and their range limited to 1,300 miles. Eventually, an assortment of Vickers Wellington and Spitfire flights were established. In August 1940, the first PR Spitfires arrived, but teething problems ensured that it would be a long time before standardisation was achieved with equipment. In August, Coastal Command flew 193 sorties over the suspected invasion ports in the Netherlands, Belgium and France.

After the threat from invasion muted in 1941, the Command's attention turned to the Battle of the Atlantic. During this time, the Command used the Martin Maryland, which excelled in PR work. On 13 July 1941, the first PR Mosquito arrived, though it was some time before the aircraft was operational. By September 1941, the operational strength of the PRU's first flight was 37 Spitfires, two Marylands and two Mosquitoes. The long-range Spitfires and Mosquitoes could reach deep into German airspace, and photograph the Baltic Sea ports and monitor German surface ships. Flights of eight hours were not uncommon. One Spitfire reached Gdynia, searching for the German battleship Tirpitz. Tactics needed to vary to avoid Spitfires being intercepted by German patrols at heights of 30,000 ft. Constant trips alerted the Germans to the British operations, but the Admiralty insisted in the volume of flights so they could keep tabs on German capital ships. With surprise lost, the only solution was to change the height and directions of approach.

Over France, the losses became quite severe, particularly over the port of Brest, France. German defences were strong, owing to Operation Cerberus and Operation Donnerkeil, a joint Kriegsmarine and Luftwaffe plan to enable the escape of Gneisenau, Scharnhorst and Prinz Eugen through the English Channel. Five Spitfires and a Mosquito were lost on PR operations in December 1941. The failure to photograph and pin-point the location of the ships, led to their successful move to Germany in February 1942. It was not until the day of the German operation that a Coastal Command aircraft caught sight of the ships, and by then it was too late.

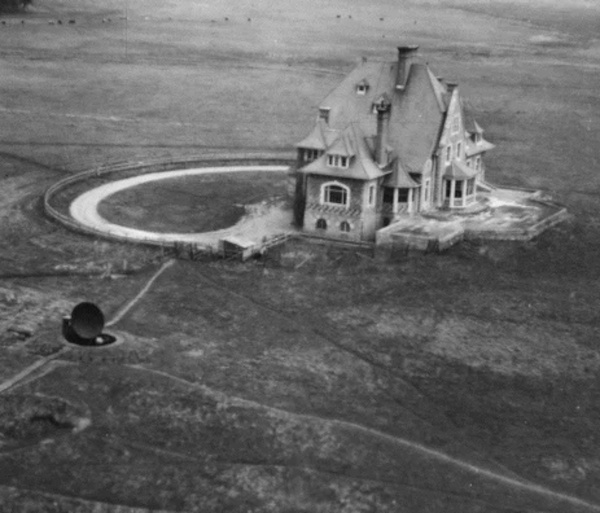
The image taken by a PR Coastal Command Spitfire, of the Würzburg radar set.

Success was forthcoming in 1942. Later, in February 1942, Coastal Command identified the Luftwaffe Würzburg radar sets in France. Eager to evaluate them, the British Army carried out Operation Biting, a commando raid to capture, dismantle and transport an example of the mobile radar to Britain. The force increased to 70 aircraft in eight flights as the year progressed. Operations were carried out in the Atlantic, over Scandinavia, the North Sea, and the Baltic Sea. In November, PR units operated from Gibraltar in support of Operation Torch, the Allied landing in French North Africa. It was detailed to keep watch on the movements of the Vichy French Fleet at Toulon, France. One of the most active squadrons at this time operated Spitfires. No. 540 Squadron RAF was particularly busy in 1943, over Norway.

In June 1943, decreased demand from the Admiralty meant the PRU supported RAF Bomber Command more frequently. In the Battle of the Ruhr, extensive use of PR Spitfires to identify and report the effects of air attacks. Spitfires of No. 542 Squadron RAF were used in this way to record the results of Operation Chastise. PRU was also instrumental in locating German missile testing sites on the Baltic Sea, near Peenemünde, allowing Bomber Command to attack them. In September 1943, the Admiralty asked for the PRU's help in Operation Source, to cripple German heavy units in Norway. No. 544 Squadron RAF contributed to the success of the operation. After this success, all PR units were standardised at strength of 20 aircraft.

The identification of German missile sites by the PRU made Operation Crossbow possible in 1944. Coastal Command continually identified German V-1 launch ramps, despite the German camouflage efforts. This enabled British aircraft to bomb them and reduce their effectiveness by one-third. By June, 69 ramps had been located, although it was not until 26 February 1945, when Squadron Leader J.E.S. White actually spotted a V-2, on its launch pad, ready to fire, that it became clear how elusive a weapon of that size could be.

In late 1944, No. 540 Squadron RAF supported No. 5 Group RAFs bombing and sinking of the Tirpitz. it covered northern Germany and Scandinavia until the end of the war. No. 544 Squadron RAF, another Coastal Command veteran, flew missions during Operation Frugal, flying Top Secret mail to the Soviet Union, during the Fourth Moscow Conference, 9 to 20 October 1944. The same operations were carried out during the Yalta Conference in February 1945. At the end of the war in May 1945, only No. 540 and 541 Squadrons were kept in being in the post-war RAF.

== Casualties ==
Coastal Command lost 2,060 aircraft to all causes; 741 during anti-submarine (A/S) sorties, 876 during anti-shipping operations (ASO), 42 mine-laying, 78 during air superiority missions, 129 during bombing raids against land targets, and 194 during photo reconnaissance operations. Some 5,863 personnel were killed in action, 2,317 were killed in accidents, 38 were killed by other causes. Some 986 were wounded, 23 died of natural causes, and 1,100 were wounded by other means than enemy action. This totalled 10,327 casualties in aircrews. Some 159 ground crews were killed in action, 535 were killed in accidents and 218 were killed by other causes. A further 49 were wounded while 224 died of natural causes. Some 466 were wounded by other means for a total of 1,651.

== See also ==
- RAF Coastal Command order of battle during World War II
- RAF station
- List of Royal Air Force commands
- List of Royal Air Force aircraft squadrons

Preceded by Coastal Area	Coastal Command; 1936–1969	Succeeded by Strike Command
