= No. 521 Squadron RAF =

Defunct flying squadron of the Royal Air Force

- Active: 1 August 1942 – 31 March 1943; 1 September 1943 – 1 April 1946
- Country: United Kingdom
- Branch: Royal Air Force
- Role: meteorological
- Part of: No. 16 Group RAF, Coastal Command

Insignia
- Squadron Codes: 5O (Jun 1944 – Apr 1946)

No. 521 Squadron of the Royal Air Force was a Second World War meteorological observation unit operating from Norfolk.

== History ==
=== First formation ===
The Squadron began on 4 February 1941 as No. 401 (Met) Flight of RAF Bomber Command. When all the meteorological flights were put under RAF Coastal Command it became No. 1401 (Met) Flight. On 1 August 1942 at RAF Bircham Newton the flight combined with 1403 flight to form No. 521 (Met) Squadron. It took part in Coastal Command's meteorological operations The squadron had inherited from its 1401 flight aircraft such as Gloster Gladiator biplanes and some Hawker Hurricanes. From 1403 flight came its Bristol Blenheims and Lockheed Hudsons. Later the squadron received some Supermarine Spitfires and de Havilland Mosquitos. The operations of the original Flights and later the Squadron was taking meteorological information for weather forecasting – previously provided by merchant shipping to the Met Office. The aircraft would take measurements of temperature and humidity in set areas over the North Sea from an altitude of 40,000 ft downwards. The squadron's Mosquitoes would operate on "PAMPA" flights that took them deep into occupied Europe to assess the weather over target areas for the bombers. On 31 March 1943 at Bircham Newton the squadron was split into nos. Nos. 1401 and 1409 (Met) Flights.

=== Second formation ===
The squadron reformed on 1 September 1943 at RAF Docking, a satellite of the Bircham Newton station, adding to its original equipment Handley Page Hampdens, but doing without the earlier Mosquitos and Blenheims. In December 1943 the squadron received Lockheed Venturas to replace its Hudsons. Additional Hurricanes arrived in August 1944, to supplement the aging Gladiators, which were still on strength. Hudsons arrived again in September 1944, because the Venturas were needed elsewhere. In October 1944 the squadron moved a few miles to the other satellite of Bircham Newton, RAF Langham. For long-range missions the squadron received some Boeing Fortresses in December 1944, which were supplemented after the end of the war with Handley Page Halifaxes, by which time the squadron operated from RAF Chivenor, where the unit disbanded on 1 April 1946.

== Aircraft operated ==
Aircraft operated by no. 521 Squadron RAF, data from
From	To	Aircraft	Version
August 1942	March 1943	Bristol Blenheim	Mk.IV
August 1942	March 1943	de Havilland Mosquito	Mk.IV
August 1942	March 1943	Gloster Gladiator	Mks.I, II
August 1942	March 1943	Lockheed Hudson	Mk.III
August 1942	March 1943	Supermarine Spitfire	P.R Mk.IV
After re-formation
September 1943	December 1943	Handley Page Hampden	Mk.I
September 1943	January 1944	Lockheed Hudson	Mks.III
September 1943	April 1945	Gloster Gladiator	Mks.I, II
September 1943	November 1945	Supermarine Spitfire	Mk.IX
December 1943	October 1944	Lockheed Ventura	Mk.V
August 1944	February 1946	Hawker Hurricane	Mk.IIc
September 1944	March 1945	Lockheed Hudson	Mk.VI
December 1944	February 1946	Boeing Fortress	Mk.II
May 1945	February 1946	Boeing Fortress	Mk.III
December 1945	April 1946	Handley Page Halifax	Mk.VI

== Squadron bases ==
Bases and airfields used by no. 521 Squadron RAF, data from
From	To	Base	Remark
1 August 1942	31 March 1943	RAF Bircham Newton, Norfolk	Det. at RAF Oakington, Cambridgeshire
1 September 1943	30 October 1944	RAF Docking, Norfolk	Det. at RAF Skitten, Caithness, Scotland
30 October 1944	3 November 1945	RAF Langham, Norfolk	Det. at RAF Brawdy, Pembrokeshire, Wales
3 November 1945	1 April 1946	RAF Chivenor, Devon	

== See also ==
- List of RAF squadrons
