= No. 1409 Flight RAF =

Former Royal Air Force meteorological reconnaissance flight

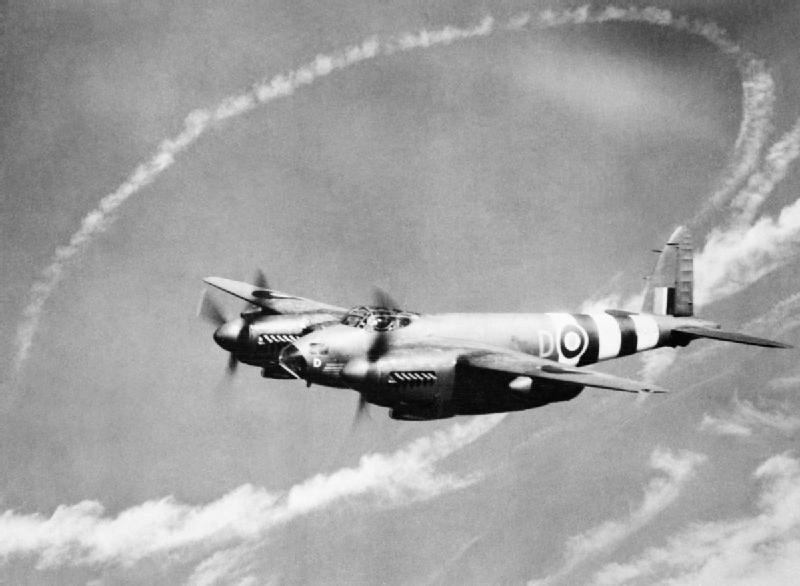
- Mosquito PR Mark IX ML897 of 1409 Flight in 1944.
- Active: 1 April 1943 – 13 May 1946
- Country: United Kingdom
- Branch: Royal Air Force
- Role: meteorological
- Part of: No. 8 Group RAF, Bomber Command; No. 47 Group RAF, Transport Command
- Equipment: de Havilland Mosquito 1943–1946; Consolidated Liberator 1945–1946

Insignia
- Squadron Codes: AE

1409 (Meteorological) Flight was formed on 1 April 1943 to provide meteorological information for RAF Bomber Command and the USAAF. Equipped with unarmed de Havilland Mosquito aircraft, the crews of the Flight undertook long range meteorological reconnaissance flights until the end of the Second World War in Europe and continued in this role until 1946.

Formed at RAF Oakington as part of the disbandment of 521 Squadron, the Flight was part of No. 8 Group RAF, the Pathfinders. Flying singly the missions were codenamed PAMPA (Photo-recce And Meteorological Photography Aircraft).

In January 1944 the Flight moved to RAF Wyton where it remained until July 1945 when it moved to RAF Upwood. In October 1945 the Flight was transferred to No. 47 Group RAF and partially re-equipped with Consolidated Liberator aircraft in addition to its Mosquitos at RAF Lyneham. The Flight was disbanded at Lyneham in May 1946.

During the war the Flight flew 1,364 operations for a loss of only 3 aircraft.

== Stations ==
- RAF Oakington: 1 April 1943 – January 1944
- RAF Wyton: January 1944 – 4 July 1945
- RAF Upwood: 4 July 1945 – 10 October 1945
- RAF Lyneham: 10 October 1945 – 13 May 1946

== See also ==
- List of RAF Squadron Codes
