= Sonobuoy =

Expendable sonar system dropped/ejected from aircraft or ships

External videos
- The Sonobuoy Indicator Group AN/AQA-1: Operation

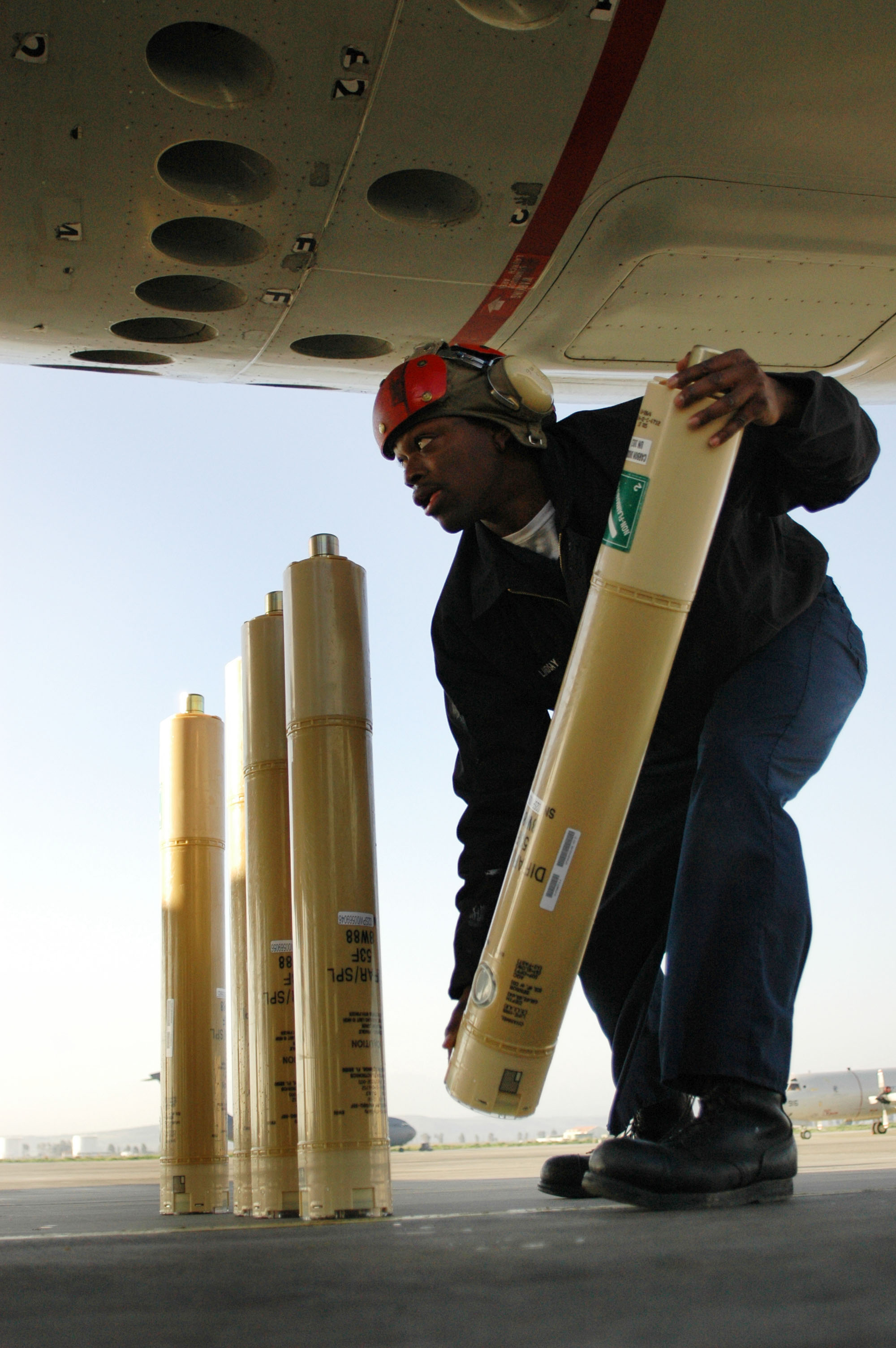
Sonobuoy being loaded onto a USN P-3C Orion aircraft

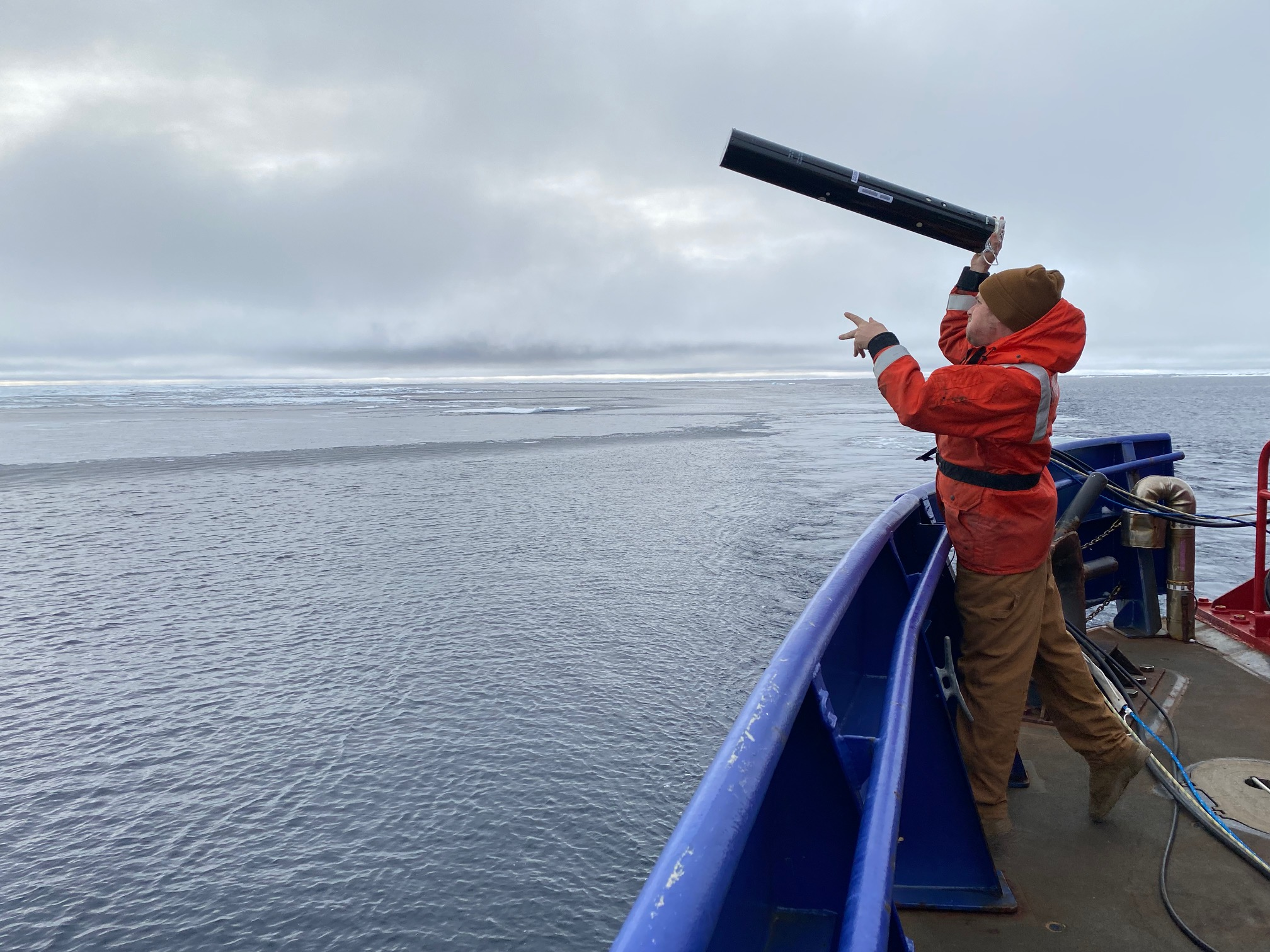
Hand deployment of a sonobuoy in the Arctic Ocean from the aft deck of the R/V Sikuliaq

A sonobuoy is a small expendable sonar buoy dropped from aircraft or ships for anti-submarine warfare or underwater acoustic research. The name is a portmanteau of sonar and buoy. Sonobuoys are typically around 13 cm (5 in) in diameter and 91 cm (3 ft) long. When floating on the water, sonobuoys have both a radio transmitter above the surface and hydrophone sensors underwater. Sonobuoys are important for enhancing Undersea Domain Awareness (UDA), providing a means to detect, locate and track submarines and other underwater threats. Playing a role in anti-submarine warfare (ASW) and other naval operations, they support naval security and the protection of naval carrier strike groups.

== Theory of operation ==
Sonobuoys are ejected from aircraft in canisters and deploy upon water impact. An inflatable surface float with a radio transmitter remains on the surface for communication with the aircraft, while one or more hydrophone sensors and stabilizing equipment descend below the surface to a selected depth that is variable, depending on environmental conditions and the search pattern. The buoy relays acoustic information from its hydrophone(s) via UHF/VHF radio to operators on board the aircraft.

== History ==
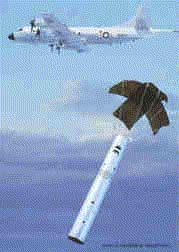
P-3 Orion paradropping a sonobuoy

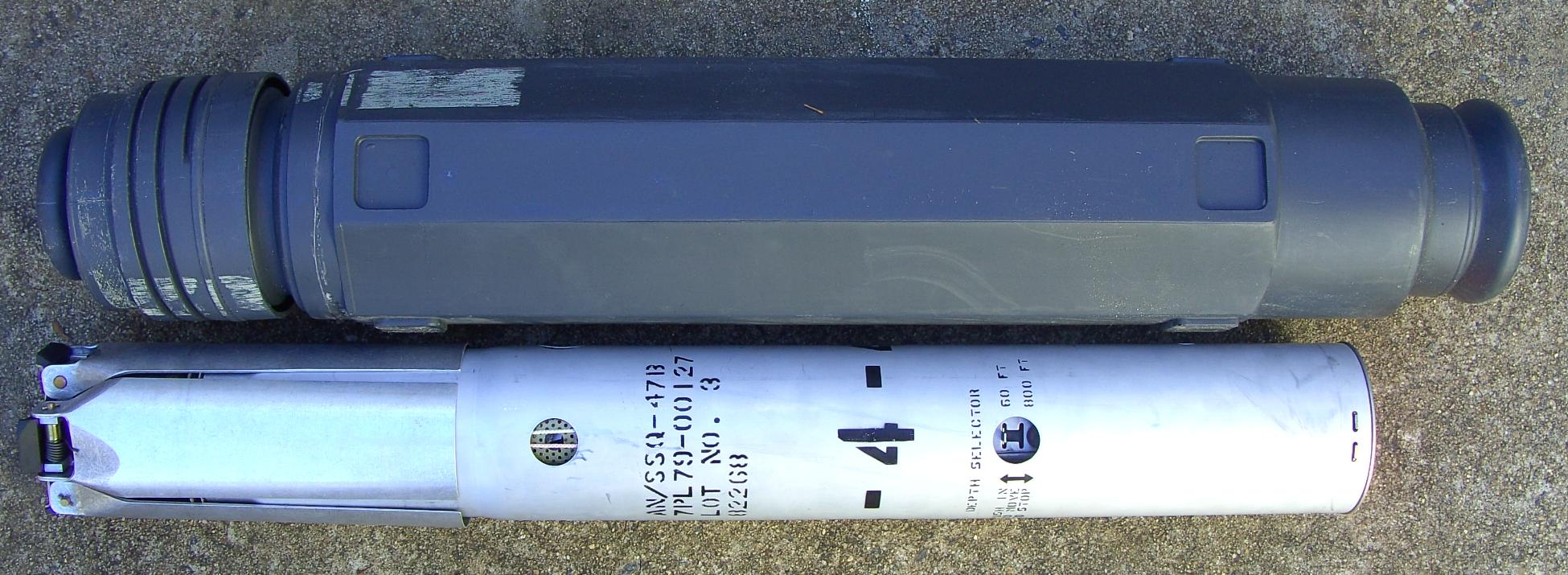
AN/SSQ-47B active pinger ranging sonar sonobuoy (frequency #4) and shipping container (octagonal form aids stacking)

With the technological improvement of the submarine in modern warfare, the need for an effective tracking system was born. Sound Navigation And Ranging (SONAR) was originally developed by the British—who called it ASDIC—in the waning days of World War I. At the time the only way to detect submarines was by listening for them (passive sonar), or visually by chance when they were on the surface recharging their battery banks. Air patrols (the British mostly used small airships which had the advantage of long endurance) could spot surfaced submarines and occasionally, when conditions were right, even submerged ones as the diving depth of submarines of the era was so limited. If contact was made, they would follow the submarine while summoning surface ships by radio to attack it.

Sonar saw extremely limited use and was mostly tested in the Atlantic Ocean with few naval officers seeing any merit in the system. With the end of World War I came the end to serious development of sonar in the United States, that fact was to be reinstated in the early days of World War II. While the United Kingdom pursued the development of sonar during the interwar period, the United States Coast and Geodetic Survey during the 1920s developed the radio acoustic ranging method of fixing the position of survey ships during hydrographic survey operations by detonating a small explosive at the location of the ship, recording the time it took for the sound of the explosion to reach distant hydrophones mounted at shore stations or aboard crewed station ships, and radioing the time of receipt of the sound to the ship, allowing the crew to make precise position fixes by using triangulation. In 1931, the Coast and Geodetic Survey proposed the replacement of crewed station ships with "radio-sonobuoys", and placed the new buoys in service beginning in July 1936. These buoys weighed 700 pounds (320 kg), could be deployed or recovered by Coast and Geodetic Survey ships in five minutes, and were equipped with subsurface hydrophones, batteries, and radio transmitters that automatically sent a radio signal when their hydrophones detected the sound of a ranging explosion. These "radio-sonobuoys" were the ancestors of the sonobuoys that began to appear in the 1940s.

The damage inflicted upon the Allies by German U-boats during World War II made the need for sonar a priority. With millions of tons of shipping being sunk in the Atlantic, there was a need to locate submarines so that they could be sunk or prevented from attacking. Sonar was installed on a number of ships along with radar and high-frequency direction finding ("Huff-Duff") to detect surfaced submarines. While sonar was a primitive system, it was constantly improved.

Modern anti-submarine warfare methods evolved from the techniques devised for the movement of convoys and battle groups through hostile waters during World War II. It was imperative that submarines be detected and neutralized long before the task group came within range of an attack. Aircraft-based submarine detection was the obvious solution. The maturity of radio communication and sonar technology made it possible to combine a sonar transducer, batteries, a radio transmitter and whip antenna, within a self-contained air-deployed floating (sono)buoy.

Early sonobuoys had limited range, limited battery life and were overwhelmed by the noise of the ocean. They first appeared during World War II, in which they first were used in July 1942 by RAF Coastal Command under the code name 'High Tea', the first squadron to use them operationally being No. 210 Squadron RAF, operating Sunderlands. They were also limited by the use of human ears to discriminate man-made noises from the oceanic background. However, they demonstrated that the technology was viable. With the development of better hydrophones, the transistor and miniaturization, and the realization that very low frequency sound was important, more effective acoustic sensors followed. The sonobuoy went from being an imposing six-foot (1.8 m) tall, two-foot (0.61 m) diameter sensor to the compact suite of electronics it is today.

The advancement in sonobuoy technology were to be later used to aid anti-submarine aircraft such as the P-2 Neptune, S-2 Tracker, S-3B Viking and P-3 Orion.

== Operation ==
Sonobuoys are classified into three categories: active, passive and special purpose.

- Active sonobuoys emit sound energy (pings) into the water and listen for the returning echo before transmitting information—usually range and bearing—via UHF/VHF radio to a receiving ship or aircraft. The original active sonobuoys pinged continuously after deployment for a predetermined period of time. Later, Command Activated Sonobuoy System (CASS) sonobuoys allowed the aircraft to trigger pings (or buoy scuttling) via a radio link. This evolved into DICASS (Directional CASS) in which the return echo contained bearing as well as range data.
- Passive sonobuoys emit nothing into the water, but rather listen, waiting for sound waves (for instance, power plant, propeller or door-closing and other noises) from ships or submarines, or other acoustic signals of interest such as a crashed aircraft's black box pinger, to reach the hydrophone. The sound is then transmitted via UHF/VHF radio to a receiving ship or aircraft.
- Special purpose sonobuoys relay various types of oceanographic data to a ship, aircraft, or satellite. There are three types of special-purpose sonobuoys in use today. These sonobuoys are not designed for use in submarine detection or localization.
  - BT—The bathythermobuoy (BT) relay bathythermographic and/or salinity readings at various depths. Laying a pattern of sonobuoys is often preceded by laying one or more bathythermobouys to detect density/temperature strata. Such strata can act as sonar reflectors or, conversely, as waveguides.
  - SAR—The search and rescue (SAR) buoy is designed to operate as a floating radio frequency beacon. As such, it is used to assist in marking the location of an aircraft crash site, a sunken ship, or survivors at sea.
  - ATAC/DLC—Air transportable communication (ATAC) and down-link communication (DLC) buoys, such as the UQC, or "gertrude", are intended for use as a means of communication between an aircraft and a submarine, or between a ship and a submarine.

This information is analyzed by computers, acoustic operators and tactical coordinators to interpret the sonobuoy information.

Active and/or passive sonobuoys may be laid in large fields or barriers for initial detection. Active buoys may then be used for precise location. Passive buoys may also be deployed on the surface in patterns to allow relatively precise location by triangulation. Multiple aircraft or ships monitor the pattern either passively listening or actively transmitting to drive the submarine into the sonar net. Sometimes the pattern takes the shape of a grid or other array formation and complex beamforming signal processing is used to transcend the capabilities of single, or limited numbers of, hydrophones.

== See also ==
- GPS sonobuoy
- List of US Navy example sonobuoy systems
