= Estoppey D-series =

American bombsight series

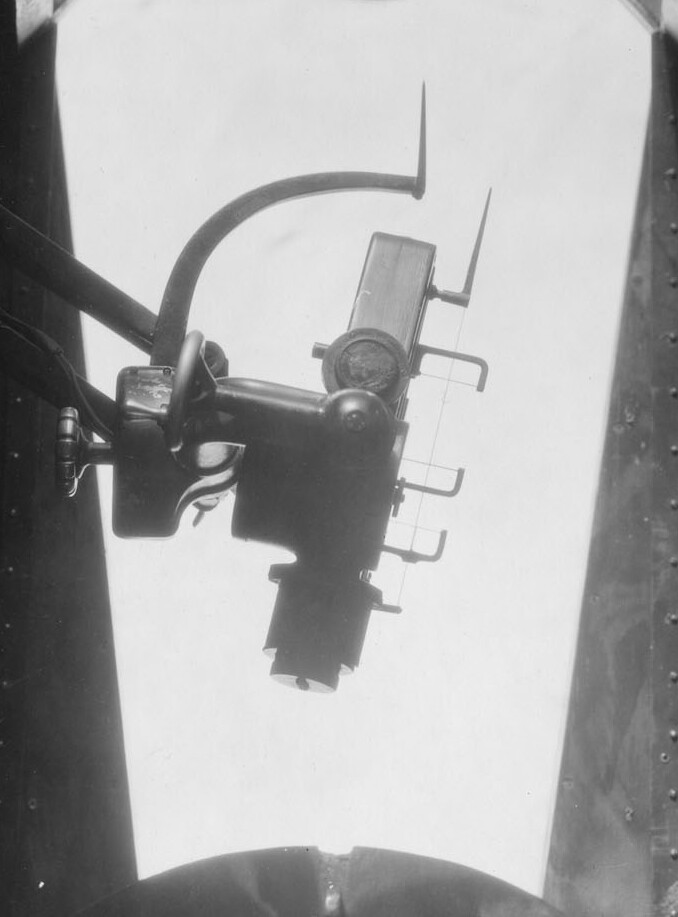
An Estoppey D-1 in the bomb aiming window of a Martin MB-2 bomber. In this case, the sight is rotated to the right to account for wind.

The Estoppey D-series was a line of inter-war era bombsights developed by Georges Estoppey of the US Army Air Corps' McCook Field, starting with the D-1 of 1922. A key feature was the use of a pendulum to keep the bombsight correctly oriented towards the ground even as the aircraft maneuvered, and dashpots to keep it from swinging around in turbulence.

In testing in 1923, the D-1 proved more accurate than the US Navy's Mark III or the Army's Mk. I, and twice as accurate as the older Michelin bombsight designs. A series of minor updates led to the first widely used production model, 1925's D-4, of which several hundred were produced. The design was among the most advanced of its era but was still inaccurate to the point of being useless at altitudes over 8,000 feet (2,400 m).

The D-7 of 1931 was similar to the D-4 but added illumination for night use, an automatic pilot direction indicator that signalled the pilot which direction to turn, and automatic bomb release to improve timing. While the D-7 was effective, the Army was planning to shift to the Sperry bombsight, which offered dramatically better accuracy. The Sperry proved difficult to produce in quantity, and in 1938 the Army ordered another production run of a much more basic update of the D-4, designated as the D-8. The D-8 was the most produced version in the D-series, with just over 10,000 built; most were delivered to the Soviet Union under the Lend-Lease program.

Estoppey entered a lengthy and acrimonious series of legal battles with the Army and Navy over royalties for his concepts. As most of the designs were produced while he worked for the Air Corps, he was not eligible for royalties. On leaving military employment in 1926, he immediately began demanding fees from both the Army and the Navy, eventually receiving several thousand dollars.

== History ==
=== Early bombsights ===
Early bombsights were capable of calculating only the forward distance the bomb would move when dropped from a given altitude. To use these systems, the aircraft would first change its heading until it could see no further sideways drift of objects on the ground, indicating that the aircraft was flying in the same direction as the wind. The speed and current altitude were then entered into the bombsight, which would move a pointer fore and aft to indicate the correct spot to drop the bombs. The bomb drop would be made when the target passed through the indicator on the bombsight.

Even while approaching directly along the wind line, the speed of that wind will have an effect by speeding up or slowing down the speed compared to the ground. As the bomb moves forward by a fixed distance based on airspeed and altitude, any difference between airspeed and ground speed will result in the bomb falling long or short by that distance. For instance, if a particular bomb requires 20 seconds to reach the ground from a particular altitude, and the aircraft is flying at 150 kilometres per hour (93 mph), the bomb would move forward 830 metres (2,720 ft) before it hit. If the plane is flying in a wind that is 20 kilometres per hour (12 mph) on its nose, its ground speed is only 130 km/h, and in this case, the bombs will travel only 720 metres (2,360 ft), missing by over 100 m.

The solution used at the time was to use a stopwatch as the aircraft approaches the target. The bomb aimer would pick a suitable object on the ground along the line of approach, perhaps the target itself, and then time it as it passed through two markers on the sight set at a fixed angle. The ground speed could then be calculated by looking up the speed on a table of times and altitudes, although some systems offered some level of automation for this task. Taking this measurement was not a trivial process, especially as almost all of these systems had to be operated by the pilot while looking downward through the sights and trying to keep the plane level at the same time. If the plane's angle changed even a few degrees during the process, the measurements would become meaningless.

=== D-1 ===
Georges Louis Estoppey immigrated to the United States in 1916 and soon began work on a new bombsight that would address these issues. Estoppey came up with a system that would keep the sight correctly perpendicular to the ground using a pendulum, and then stabilized its motion using dashpots so it did not swing about after moving. He filed for three patents on the concept during World War I, and formed the Musa-Estoppey Company in New York to build them. He received the patents in March 1919, but the company failed in 1921.

Estoppey then went to work for the Air Service Engineering Division at McCook Field, where he continued refining the design and introduced the first production-quality version as the D-1 in 1922. In tests at the Aberdeen Proving Ground the Army produced hit rates of 80% under standard conditions, concluding that it offered "much greater accuracy than with the old Navy Mark III or Army Mark IA sights" and that it was "twice as accurate as the Michelin". The Navy was also impressed, but only to the point of using a small number while they waited for newer developments of their own being carried out by Carl Norden to stabilize the Mark III. This led to an order for 16 D-1's, with two of those being sent to the Navy. Tests against the USS Virginia and USS New Jersey in 1923 led to a further order of 100, with 14 of those being sent to the Navy. Eventually, total production amounted to 114 from Pioneer Instrument Company for the Army and another 14 for the Navy from Eberhart Steel.

In use, the D-1 differed little from earlier bombsight designs like the Michelin. The bombardier would first watch the target move in relation to a vertical metal wire, and direct the pilot left or right until any sideways drift was seen to stop. At that point, he would watch the motion of the target along the wire until it crossed the line defined by two horizontal wires, the "top wire" and "timing wire". He would then begin turning a crank with his left hand which caused the timing wire to begin moving rearward, attempting to move it so the wire remained on top of the target as the aircraft moved forwards. The crank also moved the rear sighting wire moved forward at the same speed. When the watch indicated 15 seconds, he stopped cranking, thereby providing a measurement of the ground speed. This measurement left the upper wire positioned such that the ground speed had been accounted for. They then continued watching until the top wire aligned with the lower "range wire", and dropped at that instant.

=== Basic updates, D-4 ===
Timing the drop using the stopwatch proved to be a practical problem, and Estoppey began work on an automatic timer for the D-2. The Engineering Division purchased three prototypes from Pioneer in 1925. The physical layout of the D-2 was significantly different than the D-1, with the sights in the center of a large U-shaped calculator. The two D-3 examples replaced the pendulum system of the D-2 with a gyroscopic platform from Sperry Gyroscope. Neither design proved to offer enough of an advance on the D-1 to warrant full-scale production.

Meanwhile, in service, the D-1 proved to be too fragile for the rough handling of the crew, who were found to often use the bombsight as a handle while getting in and out of the aircraft. This led to the D-4, which was more robust and also included the automatic timing system. Because it was so similar to the earlier models, three prototypes were ordered and rapidly delivered, but the Army concluded they too represented too small an improvement to consider production, especially as they were now awaiting much more advanced designs. Those advanced designs failed to emerge, and over the next five years, the Army ordered several batches of the D-4, amounting to 230 examples, with the Navy adding another 40 for low-altitude work. The Army put it into operational use in 1926.

The timing system on the D-4 greatly simplified operation. Instead of timing the motion for a fixed time, and then using that to calculate the needed setup, the system performed this automatically. The bomb aimer simply rotated a crank as the timer wound down, and when it ran out the crank was automatically disconnected with the sights set to the right angle.

=== New concepts ===
In addition to the minor updates to the original concept, Estoppey also worked on entirely new designs. The first and most developed of these was the D-5, which used the new "synchronous" or "tachometric" concept to time the drop. In contrast to the previous designs where the speed over the ground was measured directly with the stopwatch, in these designs the speed was measured by a ball-and-disk integrator system. The bombardier would first enter an estimate of the wind speed and direction based on previous measurements, generally by the navigator. This would cause the sights, a low-power telescope, to begin moving so that it would track an object on the ground. The bombardier would then adjust the initial estimate by turning dials to change the direction or speed until objects could be seen unmoving in the sight. At this point, the system held a highly accurate measurement of the ground speed and course. While this offered unparalleled accuracy in theory, in practice the D-5 proved less accurate than the D-4, and the Air Corps recommended that "no further experimental work be done on the D-5 sight."

The next known version is the D-7, which used the same general mechanism as the D-4, but added several updates. Among these was an illuminated crosshair sighting system that was suitable for use at night, a system that automatically released the bombs at the right time to eliminate the delays in the bombardier pressing the release button, and a pilot direction indicator that was operated simply by turning the sight to point at the target. Although these were worthy updates, the expected imminent arrival of the more advanced designs from Sperry meant there was no reason to buy the D-7 in the meantime.

=== D-8 ===
The final development of the line was the D-8, ordered due to ongoing production delays with the Sperry S-1 and Norden Mk. XV. The D-8 was a series of minor upgrades to the D-4 designed by its original manufacturer, Gaertner Scientific of Chicago. These allowed it to operate at higher speeds and altitudes of the new aircraft being introduced. After Gaertner supplied 80 hand-assembled units, the Army sent a production contract to National Cash Register (NCR) for 15,000 units immediately after the Attack on Pearl Harbor, at $200 a unit. In testing against the Norden, the D-8 managed 3 hits for 50 bombs dropped, compared to 48 out of 50 for the Norden. Aware of its limits, the Army nevertheless sent it to "airplanes for which no other sight is available."

The Army continued to press for faster deliveries of the Norden, but the Navy vacillated on allowing production to begin at other plants, fearing doing so would upset production at the main Norden plant and delay their own deliveries. At a meeting on 11 November 1942, the Army complained that while they were taking every Norden they could and immediately placing them in an airplane, the Navy had more sights than planes and were simply stockpiling their Nordens in warehouses. Meanwhile, the Navy would promise to deliver a certain quantity of sights for a given month, so the Army would adjust their aircraft orders to match, only to receive a different number and either have missed the opportunity to produce more than a month, or have to deliver them with what one Air Corps member called "this damn D-8 sight that I would just as soon have a couple of nails and a wire."

After enormous arguments and inter-service rivalries, the issue of the Norden was ultimately solved unexpectedly when the Navy concluded it couldn't hit ships anyway. They turned their attention to the use of dive bombers and torpedo bombers, like most other Naval aviation forces, and gave up entirely on the use of high-altitude bombing against ships. The entire production was given over to the Army. By this time, NCR was in full production of the D-8, with 2,000 being delivered a month. Although the contract was cancelled in October 1943, 10,000 had already been produced by this point. These were then sent, along with another 2,000 D-4Bs, to the Soviet Union as part of the Lend Lease.

=== Lawsuits ===
In 1924, Estoppey demanded that he be paid royalties for his designs. Air Service chief Major General Mason Patrick refused, based on the fact that they had been designed and built while Estoppey was in the employ of the Air Corps. His contract did have an allowance for up to 7.5% royalties up to a maximum of $7,500 (equivalent to $137,607 in 2024), but these could only be paid on devices that were sold after he left government service. Estoppey did so in July 1926, and that resulted in payments of $2,887 in 1927 and $2,600 in 1932.

With no more devices being built on his designs after that date, he turned his attention to the Navy, claiming that the Norden Mark XI "fall within the disclosures and scope of my patents." The Navy disagreed, noting that they purchased the Mark XI specifically because it allowed attacks on moving targets, something the Estoppey never solved. Nevertheless, they agreed to pay $2,000 for the use of patent 1,296,640.

== Description ==
The D-1, 4 and 8 were very similar devices differing only in details. This description is based on the D-4, but the reference video shows the later D-8 which differs only in small ways.

The D-series bombsights consisted of three primary parts, a mounting system fixed to the aircraft, a long curved metal bar with a pointer extending from the front, and the bombsight mechanism itself. The mounting system was used before flight to position and rotate the bombsight so it was level to the aircraft and pointing directly along its normal direction of flight, and was unused after that. A separate system allowed the bombsight as a whole to rotate to the right or left in flight. The long C-shaped bar was used simply to indicate any rotation of the sight relative to the nose of the aircraft. The D-8 moved this indicator to the rear of the sight.

The bombsight itself was rectangular and roughly the size of a hardcover book. The sights consisted of several sets of thin metal wires on the right side of the case, a long longitudinal one running the length of the device that was used to compare the motion of the target to the aircraft's line of travel, and three horizontal ones used to time the drop, two at the bottom of the device just above the longitudinal wire, and a second at the top of the case. Opposite the upper sight, on the left side of the case, was a small hand crank.

As the bomber approached the target area, the bombardier first sights along the longitudinal wire and rotates the entire device to the left or right until the wire was on top of the target. Watching the motion of the target relative to this wire, the drift, they would call out turns to the pilot or use the pilot direction indicator until the plane was pointed in a direction so that its sideways motion relative to the target exactly offset any wind from the side. At that point, the target will be seen moving directly along the longitudinal wire.

With the drift zeroed out, the operator then consults a table printed on the side of the case that listed the approximate angle of the drop from that altitude and their current airspeed. For instance, when dropping 1,000 lb General Purpose bombs from 20,000 feet (6,100 m) altitude and 200 miles per hour (320 km/h), the bombs would have to be dropped when the target is about 40 degrees in front of the aircraft. This angle is entered into the sight and the timer is then wound up by turning the main crank to the rear, clockwise. The time the bombs take to reach the ground, from another table, is then entered onto the timer.

The bombsight is now ready for use. The operator then sights along the line from the upper sight to the foresight, initially set to that 40-degree angle. When the target passes through this line, the operator starts to rotate the crank forward, counterclockwise, which starts the timer and causes the foresight to begin moving rearward. They continue turning the crank to keep the crosshairs lined up on the target as the target is seen moving to the rear due to the forward motion of the aircraft. When the timer runs out, the crank is automatically disconnected from the sights. This has moved the sights through the angle that the bombs will move as they fall, a direct measurement of the ground speed.

This motion also leaves the rear sight in the proper location for dropping after accounting for the effects of wind. The operator now shifts their view to sight along the line from the top sight to the rear sight and releases the bombs when the target passes through that line.

The system also included a dial at the back of the case that could be used to manually adjust the timing by moving the sights forward or rearward. This was used for adjustments like spreading out a stick of bombs being released over a period instead of all at the same time, or setting "trail", the distance the bombs will fall behind the aircraft due to differences in ballistics between bomb designs.
