= Bombsight, Pilot-Directing, Mark III =

US Navy optical bomsight used before WWII

The Bombsight, Pilot-Directing, Mark III was an inter-war era bombsight developed by the US Navy to equip its bomber aircraft. It was a development of the British Course Setting Bomb Sight, or CSBS, which had been introduced in UK service in early 1918 and was demonstrated to the Navy in Washington in May 1918. As the primary bombers in Navy service at the time were flying boats where the pilot and bombardier were separated, Mark III's primary change from the CSBS was to include an electrically driven pilot direction indicator.

The Mark III was the standard Navy bombsight in the interwar period, from late 1918 until its complete replacement just before the opening of World War II. The Navy was never particularly happy with it, as it lacked the accuracy to hit a ship from higher altitudes and had no way to directly account for moving targets. The Navy continued to look for ways to improve it through this period, but none of the advances were enough to justify the production of a new model.

One of these improvements was to ask Carl Norden to stabilize the system to ease sighting, but this proved to be only a minor advance. Norden continued to consider the problem and this led to the development of the Norden bombsight, or Mark XV, which began to replace the Mark III on new aircraft starting in 1935.

== History ==
=== Previous designs ===
Early bombsights were capable of calculating only the forward distance the bomb would move when dropped from a given altitude. To use these systems, the aircraft would first change its heading until it could see no further sideways drift of objects on the ground, indicating that the aircraft was flying in the same direction as the wind. The bomb aimer would then use a stopwatch to time an object's movement along that line, and use that measurement to calculate the aircraft's ground speed. This speed and their current altitude were then entered into the bombsight, which would move a pointer fore and aft to indicate the correct spot to drop the bombs. The pilot would then attempt to position the aircraft somewhere up or downwind of the target and then approach. They would then drop the bombs when the target passed through the indicator on the bombsight.

This method of operation presented a problem for the Navy in World War I, as their primary bomb-equipped aircraft were large flying boats. In these aircraft, the pilot sat well back of the nose and had no direct line of vision to the target, at least during the period of the drop. The observer was located forward and had vision of the target throughout the approach, but they were so far away they could not easily communicate with the pilot. This led the Navy to develop a new system under the direction of A. Boettcher and B. Smith that is known as the pilot direction indicator, or PDI. After setting up the bombsight as normal, a pointer told the pilot to turn right or left to correctly approach the target. Four small lamps under the pointer indicated the distance to the drop point.

The device was tested and approved in December 1917, entering service next year as Bombsight, Pilot-Directing, Mark I.

=== Vector bombsights ===
These early bombsights had many problems. For one, as the aircraft had to fly along the wind line, it allowed anti-aircraft gunners to set up their guns along that line which made their aiming much simpler. But more important to the Navy was that their targets would generally be moving, and not along the wind line, meaning the bomber's approach would normally include residual sideways drift. Although the pilot or navigator could calculate an approach along the wind line, with some difficulty, the target could maneuver and ruin the approach. More generally, as the aircraft flew towards the target, any inaccuracy in the estimate of its speed and heading would have to be accounted for by eye to keep the aircraft approaching it, almost always resulting in some residual drift.

A solution to this problem was introduced in early 1918 by Harry Wimperis, an expert in air navigation. Flying long distances in the presence of wind was an important part of pilot and navigator training, consisting of basic vector mathematics normally carried out on a navigation chart using basic mechanical instruments like the E6-B circular slide rule. Wimperis' device, the Course Setting Bomb Sight, or CSBS, combined a device like the E6B with the bombsight mechanism. By dialling in the heading, altitude, airspeed, windspeed and wind direction, the device indicated a line along which the aircraft had to fly to eliminate drift while also moving the sights along that line to indicate the timing. The bomb aimer would then tell the pilot to turn left or right until the target was moving directly along that line, and dropped at the indicated point. These devices revolutionized air bombing and became known generally as vector bombsights.

=== Mark III ===
An example of the CSBS Mark I was demonstrated to US Navy officials in May 1918. It lacked the PDI, so it was not immediately useful for service. Boettcher was asked to adapt a PDI to the new sight, and in testing the system produced "astonishing good results." Boettcher was then told to design a version that had the PDI built-in, such that the bombardier's adjustments were automatically repeated in the pilot's sight. A production contract for 3500 Mark III's was sent to International Register Corp in August 1918. The company had completed 2200 by the time the armistice led to the contract being ended.

The new design used the CSBS' sight as the observer's side of the indicator. The sights consisted of a ring-and-bead system mounted at the top of the device. In the original CSBS, these were fixed in location, indicating the timing of the drop. In Boettcher's version, the observer rotated the sights side-to-side so they lined up with the target. Below them was a series of electrical contacts that lit up a series of lamps in front of the pilot arranged in a compact horizontal strip, replacing the much larger pointer system of the Mark I. As the pilot turned towards the lit lamp, the observer would rotate their sight to keep it on the target. Eventually, the target would lie directly ahead, the center lamp would light, and the pilot would stop turning.

=== Mark III-A ===
In more demanding tests after the war, the system proved incapable of hitting a ship from high altitude. An attempt to improve it was made by fitting a low-power telescope in place of the simple ring-and-bead sights of the original CSBS, but this offered little improvement as the image was unstable as the aircraft moved about.

Looking for a solution, the Bureau of Ordnance asked gyroscope expert Carl Norden if he could come up with a stabilizing system to keep the image steady. Testing of the three prototypes of the Mark III-A (Note: Also known in Army use as the Mark IV, which can be confusing.) took place in July and August 1921 at the Navy's Dahlgren proving grounds. While it did improve things, it was prone to failure and still did not meet the Navy's demanding accuracy requirements.

In October 1921 testing against ships, only 11 bombs of 103 dropped from 4,000 feet (1,200 m) altitude hit the targets, the anchored ships USS Indiana and USS Smith. Against the USS Iowa steaming at 6 knots (11 km/h; 6.9 mph) directly along the wind line, they managed only 2 hits from 85 bombs from the same altitude. The Navy concluded that the competing Estoppey D-1 was the "best sight available" as well as simpler and better stabilized. They would purchase a number of D-1s while awaiting better designs.

=== Moving targets ===
Another problem with the CSBS was that it could not account for moving targets, which was a serious concern to the Navy whose primary target was shipping moving as fast as it could. (Note: The UK faced the same issue and introduced the CSBS Mark IX in the 1930s, which added moving target adjustments.) Norden concluded that the only way to address both of these problems was to use a system designed for stabilization from the outset and use a timing mechanism that would measure both the ground speed and that of the target using a clock. He convinced the Navy to allow him to work on a new design while being paid to deliver a PDI for the Mark III-A. The PDIs were delivered in January 1922, by which time the new design had impressed the Navy and in June he was given a contract for three examples.

He delivered the resulting Bombsight, Mark XI for testing in the spring of 1924, but these proved disappointing. The system had several nice features, including a gyrostabilized telescopic sight and automatic sending of angle information to the PDI. However, its solution for measuring time took almost a minute to set up and was not particularly accurate. Testing at Dahlgren demonstrated "alarming irregularity." Nevertheless, the concept seemed promising and work on the system continued until May 1928, when the Navy ordered eighty examples.

=== Norden emerges ===
Even before the IX entered service, the Navy asked Norden to consider the "synchronous" concept, also known as "tachometric". In this system, the bombardier does not measure the wind speed and direction, as was the case with the vector bombsights. Instead, basic estimates of these were entered, typically provided by the navigator. A mechanical calculator in the bombsight then begins moving the sighting telescope in such a way that, if the estimates were perfect, objects on the ground would appear to be motionless. As the estimates were rarely perfect, the bombardier would instead see the objects drifting in the sight, and would then adjust two controls, left-right and fore-aft, until the motion stopped. The controls now provided highly accurate measurements of the wind speed and direction and did so in as little as 10 seconds. Moreover, any target motion was accounted for in the same measurement, finally solving all of the problems with bombing naval targets.

The resulting Bombsight, Mark XV represented an enormous advance, today known simply as the Norden bombsight. The Mark XI never entered full production, and the Mark III was phased out of service as quickly as the new sights could be delivered.
