= F2G =

F2G may refer to:

- Eberhart F2G, a circa 1920's aircraft
- Goodyear F2G Corsair, a circa 1940's aircraft
