= Sperry S-1 =

WWII optical bombsight

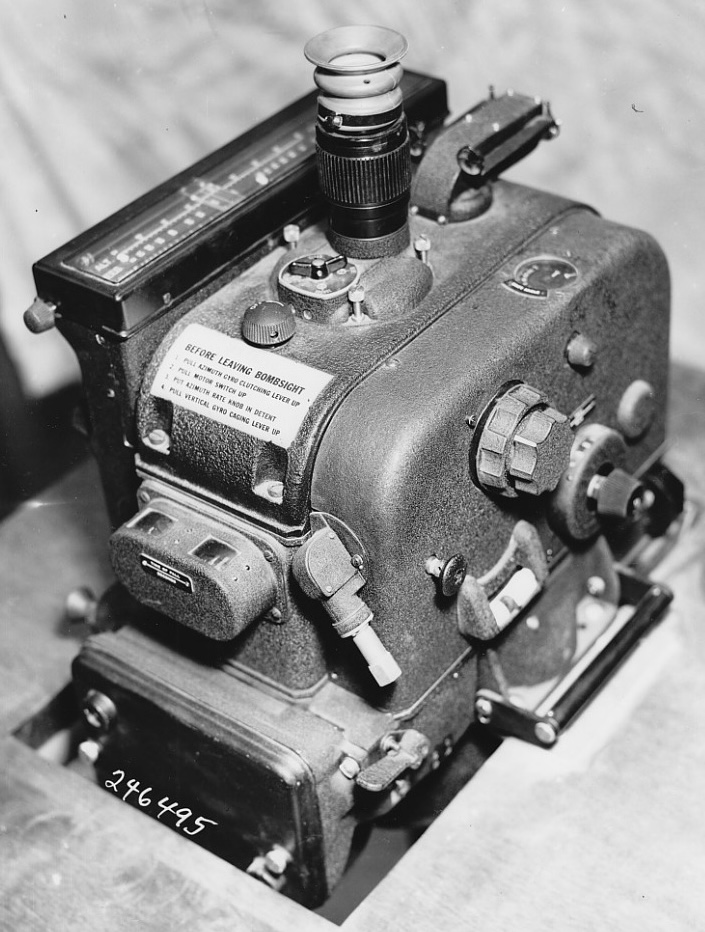
Sperry S-1 bombsight with N-2 modification on top.

The Sperry S-1 was a bombsight used by the USAAF and Royal Air Force (RAF) during World War II. Similar in concept to the more famous Norden bombsight, the S-1 used the tachometric principle to quickly and accurately measure ground speed and direction, providing higher accuracy than older designs (which could only estimate using lengthy in-flight procedures). The S-1 was physically less complicated than the Norden, easier to adjust in combat, and did not use the Norden's lengthy procedure of setting up the stabilizer. However, it was more than twice as heavy at 75 pounds (34 kg), and proved less accurate in testing.

The S-1 was introduced primarily to address the Army's inability to obtain enough of the Norden sights, whose manufacture was controlled by the US Navy. The Navy was also blocking any sale of the Norden outside the US, despite high-level pressure from the RAF to acquire them for their bombers. The Navy did not control manufacture of the S-1, so when the RAF purchased examples of the B-24 Liberator (as the LB-30) from the Army, they were equipped with the S-1. This led to the S-1's use in Army B-24s as well, while Nordens were sent to the B-17 Flying Fortress.

The Sperry's first use in combat was by the RAF, who attempted to use their Liberators in high-altitude attacks. Like the Norden, the S-1 proved much less capable in combat than initially hoped; bombing accuracy was on the order of 1,000 feet (300 m), compared to around 100 feet (30 m) in testing in the US. The RAF's experience led them to give up on the idea of high-altitude bombing, and they began to focus almost entirely on night bomber forces with the associated Mark XIV bomb sight.

As the supply of Nordens improved, the S-1 eventually became surplus and manufacture ended in 1943. By the end of the war, about 5,000 had been delivered. One of the lasting contributions of the S-1 was its associated A-5 autopilot system, which proved extremely adaptable and formed the basis of many post-war designs.

== History ==
=== Earlier efforts ===
Sperry Gyroscope had been producing gyroscope products like artificial horizons and gun levelling systems for ships since their formation in 1909. In 1914 they attached one of their stabilizers to a bombsight with the goal of making it easier to aim through while the aircraft maneuvered or was blown about in the wind. This led to a series of increasingly sophisticated designs through the 1920 and 30s, culminating in the Model O-1 of 1933. This was among the earliest of the tachometric bombsights, the corresponding Norden XV being introduced in 1930.

In testing, the Army concluded that the Norden was better in most ways; it was easier to maintain, easier to use, and generally more accurate. In 1934 they declared the Norden as their standard equipment and the O-1 was not purchased. This was not without complications. The Norden had been designed for slower, low flying Navy aircraft like the PBY. In the B-17, which flew at much higher altitudes and speeds, it was difficult to locate the target in the telescope far enough in advance to leave time to set up the sights before it had flown past the drop point. This required the bombardiers to "fudge" the data while they waited for Norden to modify the design to work in the new planes.

After a year, it was clear that Norden was having problems delivering the original Mark XV, let alone a modified version for the Army. In January 1936, the Navy stopped all shipments to the Army until the supply could at meet their own needs first. The Army returned to Sperry with the same demands for improved speed and altitude, which the older O-1 was also unable to meet. The result was an updated design, the S-1.

=== S-1 ===
In 1937, Sperry had introduced a new type of gyroscope designed by Orland Esval that was about twice the weight of the previous design and used an induction motor that spun it at a much higher speed of 30,000 rpm, compared to around 7,800 in the Norden. This made it much more stable. The higher speed also eliminated the gyroscopic precession that was an annoyance in the Norden and caused it to drift. Carl Frische added another innovation, a system that automatically levelled the gyroscopes. This was a manual process on the Norden, and could take as long as eight minutes. Together, these features made it much easier to use while the aircraft was maneuvering.

The major downside of the new design is that the induction motors required a source of alternating current (AC) power. Most instruments of the era (and many today) were instead powered by airflow, by placing a hole in the fuselage in a wind-shaded area that produced a vacuum and then using that to pull air across the outer edge of the gyros. To power the S-1, a new power supply would be needed, and after some experimentation, the Army decided to standardize on a 400 Hz design. To work more easily with this frequency, the S-1 slowed the gyros to 24,000 rpm.

By 1940, the Norden was being installed in B-17s while the S-1 was being supplied to the B-24Es. These included a number of aircraft supplied to the Royal Air Force under the lend-lease program, although surplus O-1s were also supplied to the RAF for slower aircraft. The first of these was used in combat on 30 April 1941 when a Lockheed Hudson of RAF Coastal Command used the O-1 to successfully bomb a small German ship, landing several bombs across her stern from 8,000 ft altitude. In September, the RAF made the first use of the S-1/A-5 combination on a raid on Bremen.

=== Autopilot connection ===
In testing the Norden, it was found that the accuracy of the bombsight was greater than the ability of a pilot to hold the plane in the required orientation. Norden then developed a simple heading-only autopilot, the Stabilized Bombing Approach Equipment, which compared the direction of the bombsight to the direction of the aircraft, and sent signals to the aircraft's rudder to correct for any misalignment. While this worked, there were a number of problems with the design that caused it to oscillate under certain conditions.

Sperry was the world leader in autopilot technology by this time, having introduced their first workable prototype in 1914 and the first commercial autopilot, the A-1, in the 1920s. By the 1930s this had been improved to the A-2 model, which had experimentally been connected to the O-1 bombsight, but they were not happy with the results. By the late 1930s, some of the B-17s being delivered were equipped with the latest A-3 model, which was overall similar to the Norden design, although there was no connection to the bombsights.

With the introduction of the S-1, which promised accuracy even greater than the Norden, Sperry began development of an autopilot that was capable of matching the performance of the sight. This led to the first all-electronic autopilot, the A-5. This used three two-tube amplifiers, one each for pitch, yaw, and roll. They amplified the signals from gyros like the yaw gyro in the S-1, but did so in three directions, making it the first three-axis autopilot as well. This not only allowed it to calculate the difference between the desired and real path, but the acceleration as well, which it amplified and fed into servos to move the plane's control surfaces. This allowed it to damp out undesired motion and oscillations, offering a huge advance in performance.

The resulting design was so impressive that on 17 June 1941, the Army authorized the construction of a 186,000 square metres (2,000,000 sq ft) factory in Great Neck, NY to build the S-1 and A-5. Additional assembly lines were set up at IBM and National Cash Register. They also instructed Norden to modify their system so that it could be used with the A-5 instead of Norden's SBAE. Norden refused. In February 1942, the Army contracted Honeywell to produce a new autopilot, the C-1, which combined the SBAE gyros with the A-5's amplifiers.

=== Production ends ===
Sperry's manager of military sales, Fred Vose, had a strong working relationship with the Air Force's Major General Frank Maxwell Andrews. In April 1942, Vose was killed in an airplane crash near Salt Lake City, and in early 1943, Andrews was lost in a crash near Iceland. This lost the company its two main proponents. Moreover, the Navy was upset with Sperry after they sold a license for some of their gyroscope products to Japan before the war, which failure Frische recalled as "we were practically accused of being disloyal."

By May 1943, the Navy found it now had a surplus of Nordens and offered to turn almost all production over to the Air Corps. During repeated tests from 1940 to 1942, the Army concluded that the Norden was "superior in ease of operation, accuracy and maintenance". This was at odds with reports from the field, where bombardiers generally reported the S-1 to be more accurate, especially at high altitude.

On 4 August 1943, General Barney M. Giles, chief of air staff of the GHQ Air Force, suggested the Army standardize on the Norden. The next week, Major General Davenport Johnson stated the S-1 was not as accurate as the Norden and suggested they stop purchasing the S-1 immediately. On 22 November, Brigadier General Edwin S. Perrin sent out orders cancelling production of the S-1 and A-5. Surplus examples of the S-1 were broken up as they were still top secret at this point, leading to the destruction of 2,600 sights, while the manuals and remaining A-5's were put in storage.

Training on the S-1 continued into 1944, with the requirement that bombardiers drop 25 bombs using the system. Estimates vary, but most references state approximately 5,000 were produced in total, although it is not clear if this includes the leftover examples that were destroyed.

== Description ==
The S-1 was in the form of a large metal cube, with the sighting telescope projecting from the top of the case. This contrasts with the Norden, which was in two parts and generally more unwieldy. Compared to the Norden it was larger and heavier; the S-1 sight head was about 75 pounds (34 kg), over twice as heavy as the 35 pounds (16 kg) Norden.

In use, the system would be turned on and the gyros would spin up. Once at operating speed, the bombardier would unclutch the levelling system, which would quickly level the horizontal gyro and prepare the system for use. During the approach to the target, the bombardier would pick an object on the ground, normally the target itself if it was visible, and dial in estimated values for the wind speed and direction. They would then use the directional control knobs to move the crosshairs over the selected object and turn on the tracking system. This would cause the bombsight telescope to begin moving rearward and to the side at the angular speed that would exactly cancel out any visible motion of that object if the estimates were correct.

As the estimates were rarely correct, the initial view would leave the object drifting in the sights. The bombardier would then use two drift rate controls, one for vertical and one for horizontal, to adjust the motion of the telescope so that the object stopped moving. This produced a highly accurate measurement of the wind speed and direction, as well as any motion of the target in the case of ships. One of the advantages of the S-1 was that the two controls were on opposite sides of the case, which allowed the bombardier to adjust them both without moving their hands. The Norden had all of the controls on the right side, and it was not uncommon for them to start moving the wrong control when they tried to switch from one dial to another while still looking through the sights.

Once the motion had been zeroed out, the aircraft itself had to be brought onto the path that would carry it over the drop point. This was accomplished automatically with A-5 autopilot, or using a pilot direction indicator on those aircraft that didn't have the A-5 installed. After the aircraft turned to the desired heading, the telescope would be pointing at a different location on the ground, and the bombardier would have to adjust the directional controls to compensate. The drift rate would also be reduced because the aircraft was now flying in a way to offset some of the original drift. Over a series of such adjustments they would eventually be flying on the proper course to exactly offset the wind and there would be no residual drift.

Once the drift was cancelled this did not mean the aircraft would fly over the target, as the drift was also zero if it was flying along a path parallel to the correct one. The difference between the correct path and the current path is the value of the horizontal angle of the telescope, and this also needs to be zeroed out. To address this, during the early corrections the aircraft would turn more than needed, so it would not only cancel out the drift but go further and begin to bring the aircraft back to the correct line as well. As the horizontal angle between the aircraft and the target is reduced, the angle of the turns are reduced as well, and eventually the aircraft is flying on the correct line.

Finally once the drift and path were correct, the bombardier had to account for the effects of the wind blowing the bombs to the side after they were dropped. This was done using the cross-trail dial, which tilted the entire sight slightly to one side or the other. The aircraft would then maneuver to bring the sights back over the target in the same fashion as it did to bring it onto the correct line originally. This last step was handled automatically in the Norden, which did not have a separate cross-trail adjustment.

Like the Norden, the S-1 automatically dropped the bombs at the right instant based on the various input dials. Unlike the Norden, early units had no easily visible indication of the remaining time. Instead, just before the bombs would need to be dropped, a small black indicator flipped into the view of the sighting telescope. Later units added two long linear "tangent scale" displays on the top of the case so the overall timing could be checked at a glance. An arming button on the right side was used to prevent the bombs being dropped if the button was not held in against the case. This prevented the bombs being dropped if the bombardier used some other object on the ground to do their setup and forgot to turn it off.
