= Cook Cleland =

American World War II flying ace

- Born: December 24, 1916; Cleveland, Ohio
- Died: July 13, 2007 (aged 90); Pensacola, Florida
- Burial place: Barrancas National Cemetery
- Military career
- Allegiance: United States
- Branch: United States Navy
- Service years: 1940–1967
- Rank: Captain
- Nickname: Not known
- Units: Air Group 16; USS Lexington (CV-16)
- Commands: VMF 653
- Conflicts: World War II; Korean War
- Awards: Navy Cross; Distinguished Flying Cross (2); Purple Heart; Air Medal (4)
- Other work: Air race pilot

Cook Cleland (December 24, 1916 – July 13, 2007) was a United States Navy officer, World War II flying ace, and civilian air race pilot. He participated in the Battle of Coral Sea and the Battle of the Philippine Sea. Cleland won the 1947 and 1949 Thompson Trophy Air Races.

== Early life ==
Cook Cleland was born in Cleveland, Ohio, in 1916, and graduated from the University of Missouri in 1940.

== Naval career ==
=== World War II ===
Cleland joined the Navy and became a naval aviator shortly before the attack on Pearl Harbor. He married Ora Lee Cleland during his flight training. After graduation he was assigned to the aircraft carrier USS Wasp flying the Vought SB2U Vindicator and Douglas SBD dive bombers, providing close air support for the initial Guadalcanal landings. Cleland was on the Wasp when she was sunk in September 1942, spending over 4 hours in the water, waiting for rescue.

Cleland was then assigned to the USS Lexington, becoming a plank owner. During his service on board the "Gray Ghost", he became and air ace, shooting down five Japanese aircraft, unusual for a dive bomber pilot. He and his wingman were also credited with severely crippling the Japanese aircraft carrier Junyō during the Battle of the Philippine Sea in June 1944. For his valor in action, he received the Navy Cross and many other commendations. After returning to the United States, he evaluated captured enemy aircraft as a Navy test pilot. As a Navy Pilot, he is known as call sign "Cookie".

=== Interbellum ===
Following World War II, Cleland acquired the Euclid Avenue Airport small airport in suburban Willoughby, Ohio. As a fixed-base operator, he offered flying lessons, banner towing, and air charters.

Cleland bought a surplus F4U Corsair [Goodyear-manufactured FG-1A Corsair, BuNo.13841], modified it for air racing, named it "Lucky Gallon" and flew it in the 1946 Thompson Trophy Race at an average of 357 miles per hour (575 km/h), finishing sixth.

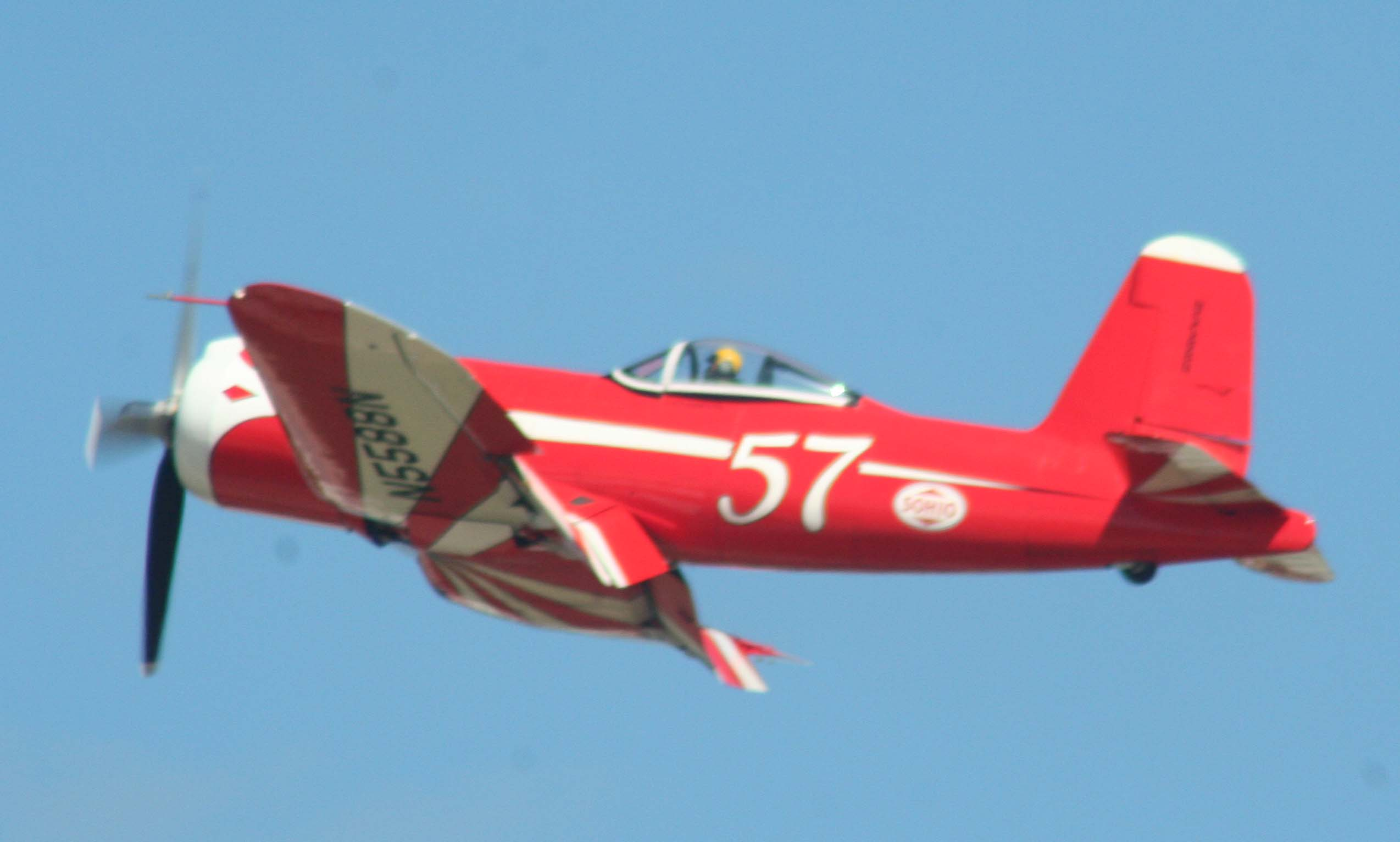
Cook Cleland's Race 57, winner of the 1949 Tinnerman Trophy that was flown by Ben McKillen

Cleland next obtained four Goodyear F2G-1 Super Corsairs with a hefty 28-cylinder Pratt & Whitney Wasp Major rated at more than 3,000 horsepower (2,237 kW). He modified these similarly to his FG-1D, additionally clipping the wingspan a few feet. He flew one of these, Race 74, to win the 1947 Thompson Trophy with a speed of 396 miles per hour (637 km/h).

The 1948 Thompson saw Cleland return with more modifications to the previous years plane, but the experimental fuel, rated at 200 octane, proved too volatile and caused the induction scoops to be blown loose, taking him out of the race.

Cleland returned in 1949, winning the Thompson for the second time flying Race 94, with a speed of 397 miles per hour (639 km/h).

Wanting to expand his air charter service, Cleland and his partner purchased three surplus PBY Catalina Flying Boats with the intent to modify them for the Alaska hunting and fishing trade. The modifications proved too costly and the planes were sold. The field closed in the latter part of 1952 after Cleland had gone back into Navy active service.

=== Korean War ===
In February 1951, Cleland returned to active duty as commanding officer of carrier-based Fighting Squadron 653 and flew the Chance-Vought F4U Corsair in 67 combat missions over North Korea. In May 1952, he was shot down by enemy ground fire during an interdiction mission in North Korea, but was rescued later the same day.

== Later life ==
Cleland held numerous United States Navy staff positions after the Korean War and played a key role in establishing the Defense Intelligence Agency.

In 1967, Cleland retired from the Navy in Kodiak, Alaska and moved to Pensacola, Florida, where he opened Cleland Antiques.

Cleland was inducted into the Motorsports Hall of Fame of America in 2000.

Cleland lost his right leg to diabetes, but did manage to attend the final reunion of his Air Group 16 at the dedication of the National World War II Memorial on May 29, 2004.

Cleland died July 13, 2007, leaving a daughter, two sons, two grandchildren, and two great-grandchildren.
