= Goodyear F2G Corsair =

American fighter aircraft

F2G "Super" Corsair
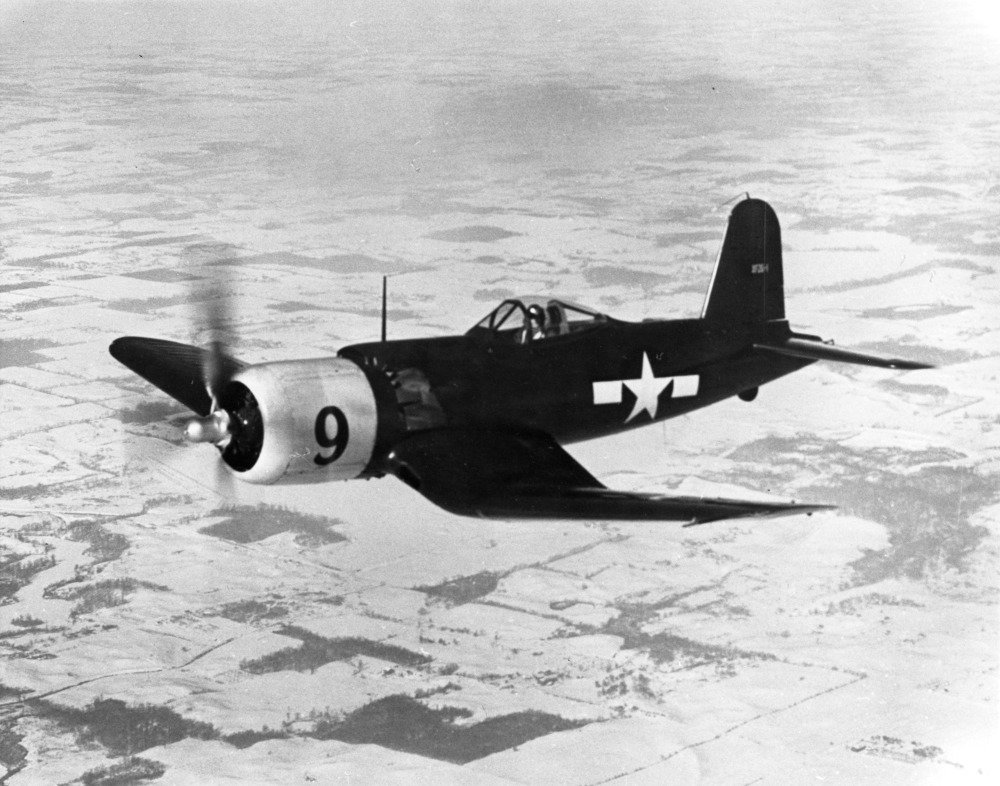
- XF2G-1

General information
- Type: Carrier-based fighter aircraft
- Manufacturer: Goodyear Aircraft
- Primary user: United States Navy
- Number built: 10 + 7 prototypes

History
- Manufactured: 1945
- Introduction date: 1945
- First flight: 15 July 1945
- Retired: 1945
- Developed from: Vought F4U Corsair

The Goodyear F2G Corsair, often referred to as the "Super Corsair", is a development by the Goodyear Aircraft Company of the Vought F4U Corsair fighter aircraft. The F2G was intended as a low-altitude interceptor and was equipped with a 28-cylinder, four-row Pratt & Whitney R-4360 air-cooled radial engine.

Such a fighter was first conceived in 1939, when Pratt & Whitney first proposed the immense, 3,000 hp (2,200 kW) R-4360, and design work began in early 1944.

== Design and development ==
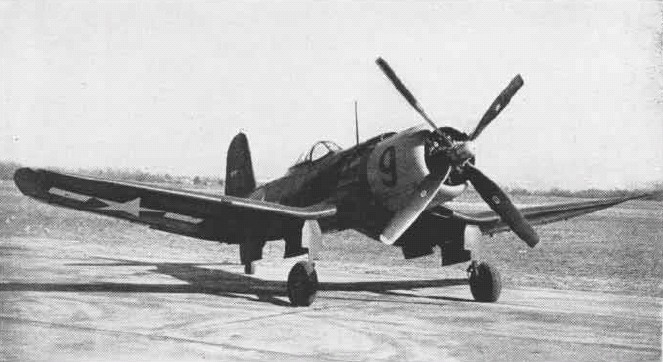
A U.S. Navy F2G-1 in 1945

Using experience gained building the F4U-1 under license – a variant known as the FG-1 – in early 1944, Goodyear modified seven standard Corsair airframes to take advantage of the 50% increase in take-off power provided by the Pratt and Whitney R-4360 engine. Known as the XF2G-1, (Note: This designation was used twice; the first XF2G-1 was a 1928 Eberhart prototype.) these aircraft also featured a new all-round vision bubble-type canopy in place of the original cockpit and turtle deck.

A land-based variant, with manually-folding wings, was to be known as the F2G-1, while a carrier version with hydraulically-folding wings and arrestor hook was to be called the F2G-2. In March 1944, Goodyear was awarded a contract to deliver 418 F2G-1 and 10 F2G-2 aircraft. The vertical stabilizer's height was also increased by 12 inches, and an auxiliary rudder was added to counteract engine torque. With all these design modifications, the rate of climb of the F2G was increased to 7,000 feet per minute, which was double that of a standard Corsair and higher than jet fighters in service at that time.

The aircraft was intended to be operated from land bases as opposed to aircraft carriers. The F2G-1 had manually folding wings and no tail hook, allowing for reduced weight. The F2G-2 had hydraulically powered wing fold mechanisms and tail hooks installed to allow for carrier operations.

Armament was to include four or six wing-mounted 0.5-inch (12.7 mm) machine guns and eight 5-inch (127 mm) rockets or two 1,000lbs (454kg) Mk.83 GP bombs or 1,600lbs (725kg) AN-Mk.1 armor piercing bombs. The internal fuel capacity of the F2G was increased greatly over that of the F4U, and provisions were also made for two droptanks.

However, post-production testing revealed deficiencies in lateral control and insufficient speed, which were bars to further development of the design. In addition, the Grumman F8F Bearcat – a rival design that had also entered production – had performance comparable to the F2G, even though it was powered with the same engine as the original F4U. By the end of the war in August 1945, when only 10 aircraft (five examples of each variant) had been completed, further production of the F2G was canceled.

== Variants ==
XF2G-1: prototype. Seven converted from standard FG-1 Corsairs. (Note: Some sources state that there were eight XF2G-1 prototypes, with the FG-1A BuNo 12992 being modified in addition to the other seven. However, 12992 was used as a static test airframe for the program and never received the XF2G designation.)

F2G-1: land-based variant, 418 ordered, five built, order cancelled.

F2G-2: carrier-based variant, 10 ordered, five built, order cancelled.

== Operators ==
United States

- United States Navy

== Accidents and incidents ==
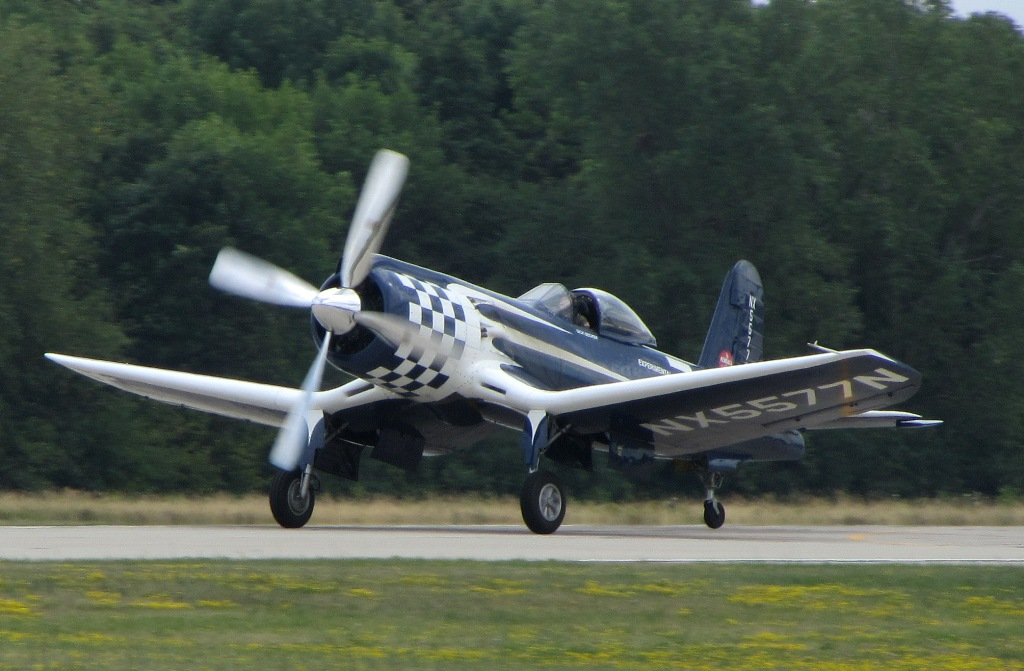
Goodyear F2G-2 Race 74 landing in 2012.

On 7 September 2012, the heavily modified F2G-2 "Race 74", BuNo 88463 and registered N5577N, was destroyed in a fatal crash that occurred when pilot Bob Odegaard was rehearsing for an airshow flight routine at the Barnes County Municipal Airport in Valley City, North Dakota.

== Surviving aircraft ==
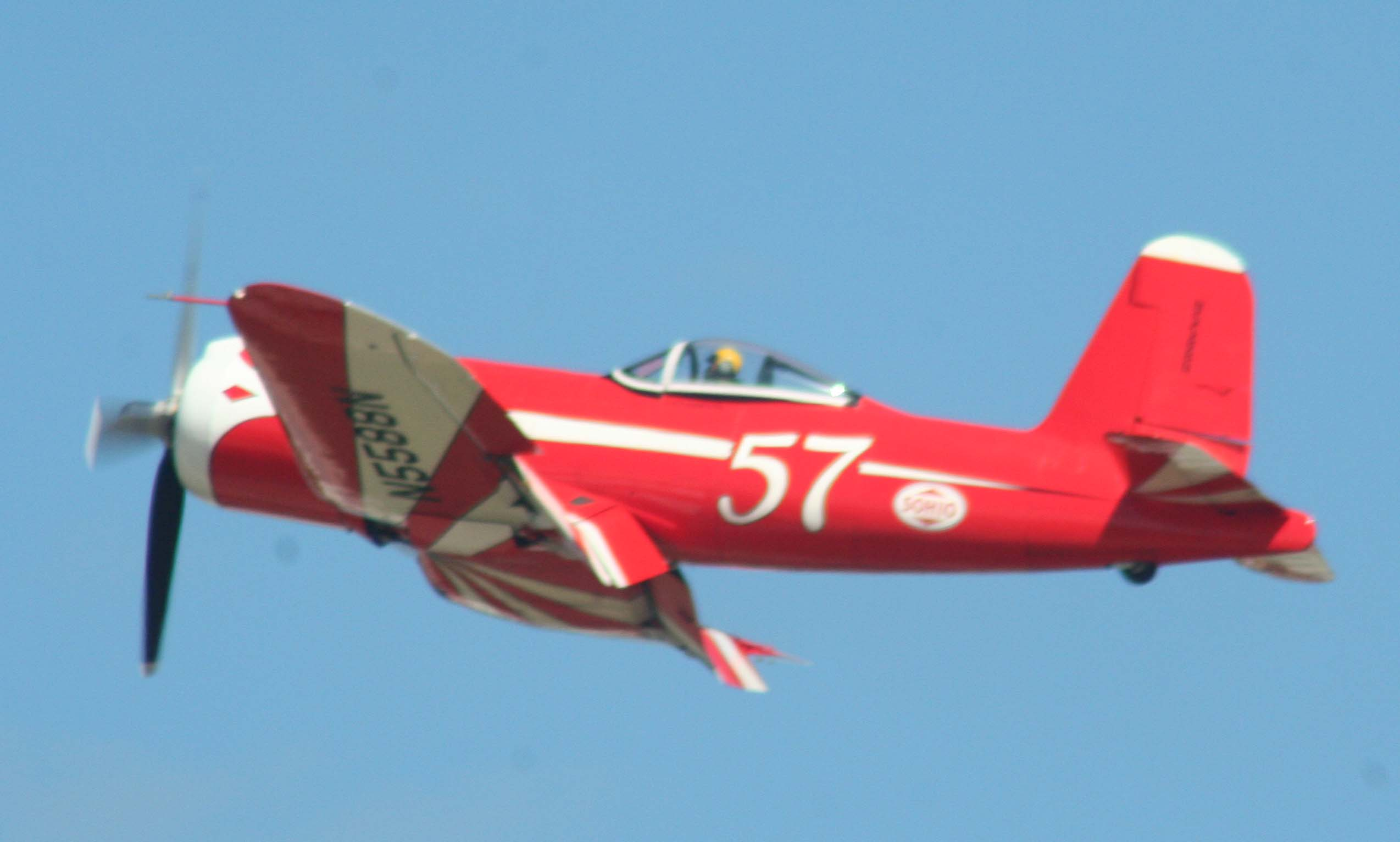
F2G-1 "Super" Corsair, painted as Race 57, flying at EAA AirVenture Oshkosh in 2005 in Oshkosh, Wisconsin

Two Super Corsairs have survived into preservation, with one airworthy.

Airworthy (F2G-1)

- 88458 (better known as "Race 57"): privately owned in Bentonville, Arkansas. It was the fifth production aircraft and was purchased by Cook Cleland, who went on to finish first in the 1947 Thompson Trophy Race and first in the 1949 Tinnerman Trophy Race. Over time, the aircraft, registered as NX5588N, went from owner to owner and slowly deteriorated. Finally, in 1996, NX5588N was purchased by Bob Odegaard of North Dakota, and was returned to airworthy condition in 1999. The aircraft was on loan to the Fargo Air Museum. Odegaard raced the aircraft in the Unlimited class at the Reno Air Races from 2006 to 2008 and it was featured in the movie Thunder Over Reno. The aircraft was bought in February, 2017 by Steuart Walton. It is based at Louise M. Thaden Airfield in Bentonville, Arkansas.

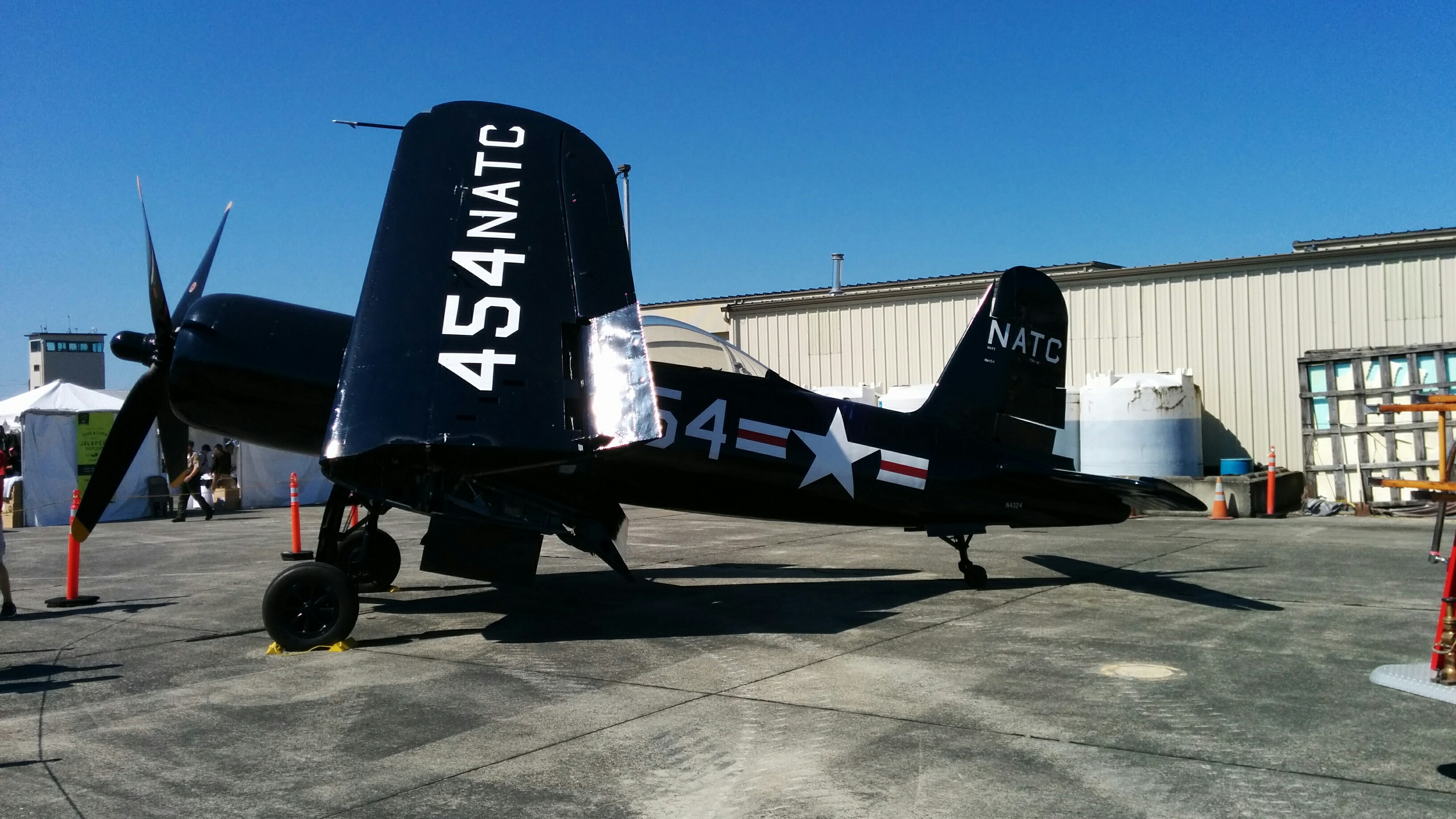
Museum of Flight's F2G-1 Corsair, BuNo 88454, on display at Paine Field, Everett, Washington for "SkyFair 2014" on July 26, 2014. Note the manually folded wings of this "land-based" Corsair.

On display (F2G-1)

- 88454: Museum of Flight in Seattle, Washington. It was the first production aircraft and was acquired from the Marine Corps by the Champlin Fighter Museum, and later came to the Museum of Flight in Seattle with the rest of the Champlin collection.

== Specifications (F2G-2) ==
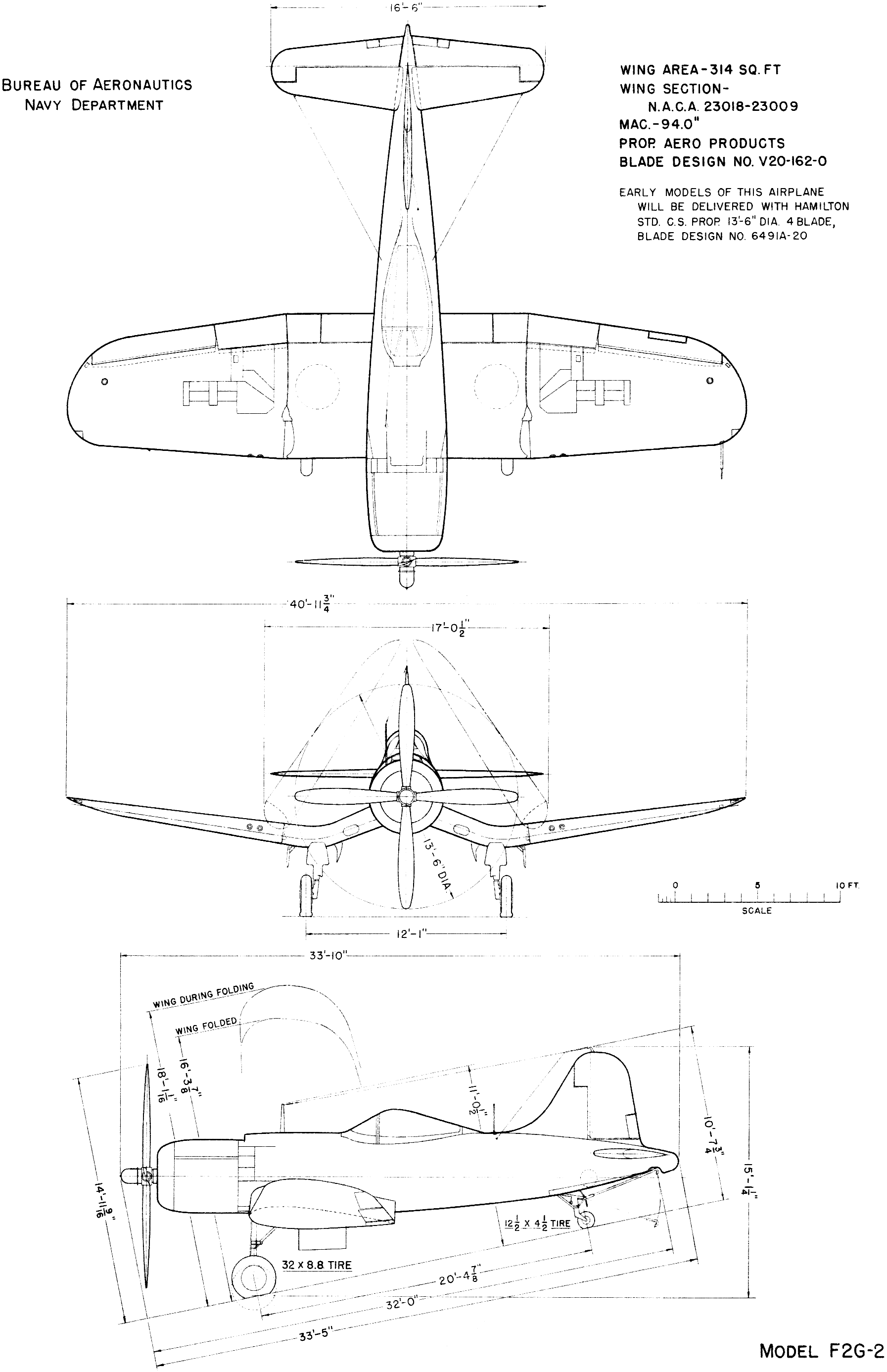
3-view line drawing of the Goodyear F2G-2 Corsair

Data from

General characteristics

- Crew: 1
- Length: 33 ft 9 in (10.3 m)
- Wingspan: 41 ft 0 in (12.5 m)
- Height: 16 ft 1 in (4.9 m)
- Wing area: 314 sq ft (29 m^{2})
- Empty weight: 10,249 lb (4,649 kg)
- Gross weight: 13,346 lb (6,054 kg)
- Max takeoff weight: 15,422 lb (6,995 kg)
- Powerplant: 1 × Pratt & Whitney R-4360-4 "Wasp Major" 28-cylinder radial engine, 3000 hp (2200 kW)

Performance

- Maximum speed: 431 mph (694 km/h, 374 kn) at 16,400 ft (5,000 m)
- Range: 1,955 mi (3,146 km, 1,699 nmi) with external tanks
- Service ceiling: 38,800 ft (11,800 m)
- Rate of climb: 4,400 ft/min (22.35 m/s)
- Wing loading: 42.5 lb/sq ft (208 kg/m^{2})
- Power/mass: 0.22 hp/lb (370 W/kg)

Armament

- Guns: 4 × .50 caliber (12.7 mm) M2 Browning machine guns, 400 rounds/gun
- Rockets: 8 × 5 in (127 mm) rockets or
- Bombs: 1,600 lb (725 kg)

== See also ==
Related development

- Vought F4U Corsair

Aircraft of comparable role, configuration, and era

- CAC CA-15
- Curtiss XP-62
- Grumman F8F Bearcat
- Hawker Sea Fury
- Kawasaki Ki-100
- Lavochkin La-9
- Martin-Baker MB5
- Republic XP-72
- Supermarine Spiteful

Related lists

- List of fighter aircraft
- List of United States Navy aircraft designations (pre-1962)
- List of military aircraft of the United States
