= Eberhart Steel Products Company =

- Founded: 1918
- Products: Aircraft parts and equipment
- Subsidiaries: Eberhart Aeroplane and Motor Company

Eberhart Steel Products Company was an American aircraft parts manufacturer, formed in 1918 in Buffalo, New York. In 1922 Eberhart received a contract to rebuild 50 Royal Aircraft Factory S.E.5A's, redesignated Eberhart S.E.5E. Eberhart also converted the French made SPAD S.XIII, replacing the French engine with an American made Wright-Hispano E. In 1925 Eberhart Aeroplane and Motor Company was formed as a subsidiary of Eberhart Steel. The only aircraft Eberhart Aeroplane created was the Eberhart XFG.

== Aircraft ==
Summary of aircraft built/modified
Model name	First flight	Number built	Type
Eberhart S.E.5E			trainer
Eberhart 13E			fighter
Eberhart FG	1927		fighter
Eberhart F2G	1928		fighter
