= Eberhart XFG =

American fighter aircraft

XFG, XF2G
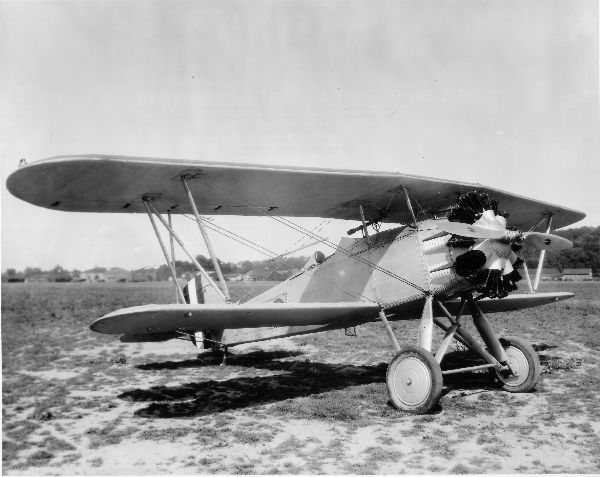

General information
- Type: Fighter
- National origin: United States
- Manufacturer: Eberhart Aeroplane and Motor Company
- Primary user: United States Navy
- Number built: 1

History
- First flight: 1927

The Eberhart XFG was an American single-seat experimental ship-borne biplane fighter aircraft developed for the United States Navy in 1927 by the Eberhart Aeroplane and Motor Company. The sole prototype was rebuilt into the XF2G with the addition of a single float and a different engine, but the aircraft was destroyed in a crash in 1928, and the type did not enter production.

== Development ==
The Eberhart Aeroplane and Motor Company produced its first original plane in 1927—the XFG—as a shipboard fighter for the U.S. Navy. It was of welded steel tube and dural construction with fabric skinning. An unusual feature was the application of sweepback to the upper mainplane and forward sweep to the lower.

== Operational history ==
The sole XFG-1 prototype, bureau number A7944, was tested by the United States Navy in late 1927, and was returned to Eberhart, where it was reconstructed as the XF2G with the addition of a single float and a new 400 hp (300 kW) Pratt & Whitney R-1340-D engine. The XF2G-1 (Note: This designation was used twice; the second XF2G-1 was a 1944 Goodyear prototype.) prototype was sent back to the Navy for testing at Anacostia in January 1928, but in March 1928, the plane crashed during trials and was destroyed. No further production ensued.

== Specifications (XFG) ==
General characteristics

- Crew: 1
- Length: 27 ft 3 in (8.30 m)
- Wingspan: 32 ft 0 in (9.75 m)
- Height: 9 ft 10 in (3.00 m)
- Wing area: 241.00 sq ft (22.38 m^{2})
- Empty weight: 2,145 lb (973 kg)
- Gross weight: 2,938 lb (1,333 kg)
- Powerplant: 1 × Pratt & Whitney R-1340-C Wasp nine-cylinder air-cooled radial engine , 425 hp (317 kW)

Performance

- Maximum speed: 155 mph (249 km/h, 135 kn)
