= Carl Norden =

Dutch-American engineer (1880–1965)

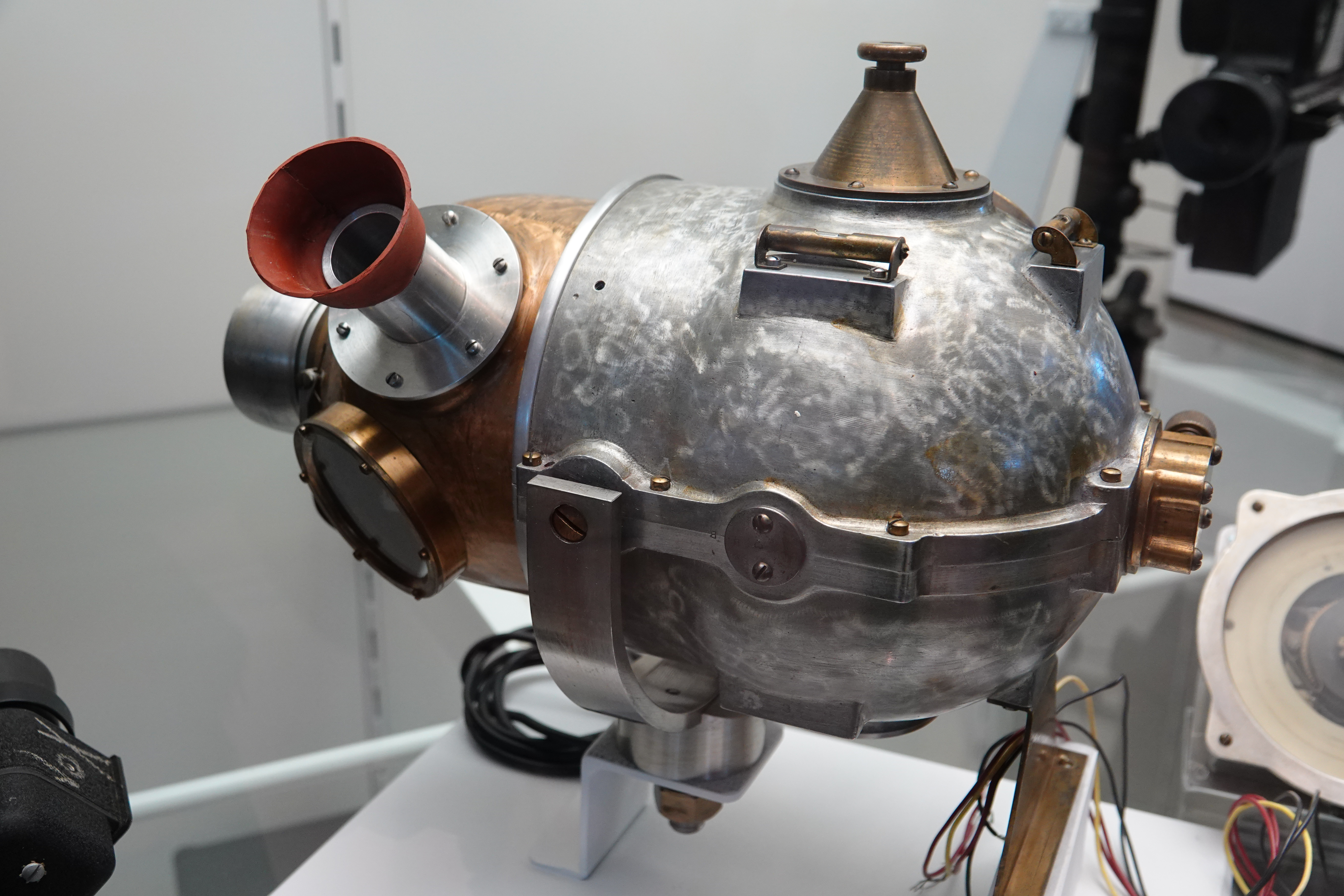
1923 Norden MK XI bombsight prototype

Carl Lucas Norden (April 23, 1880 – June 14, 1965), born Carel Lucas van Norden, was a Dutch-American engineer who invented the Norden bombsight.

== Biography ==
Norden was born in Semarang, Java. After attending a boarding school in Barneveld, Netherlands, he was educated at the ETH Zürich in Switzerland and then emigrated to the United States in 1904.

Along with Elmer Sperry, Norden worked on the first gyrostabilizers for United States ships, and became recognized for his contributions to military hardware. In 1913, he left Sperry to form his own company. In 1920, he began work on the Norden bombsight for the United States Navy. A prototype was available by 1923 and the first bombsight, containing an analog computer, was produced in 1927. Bombardiers were trained in great secrecy on how to use it. The device was used to drop bombs from high-altitude aircraft, accurately enough in practice to hit a 100-foot (30 m) circle from an altitude of 21,000 feet (6,400 m), but this accuracy was never achieved in combat.

Norden died in Zürich, Switzerland on June 14 1965.

== Legacy ==
Norden was inducted into the US National Aviation Hall of Fame in July 1994. His work on inventing the Norden bombsight was featured in Malcolm Gladwell's book The Bomber Mafia.
