= Inertial platform =

System of navigation by gyroscopes

An inertial platform, also known as a gyroscopic platform or stabilized platform, is a system using gyroscopes to maintain a platform in a fixed orientation in space despite the movement of the vehicle that it is attached to. These can then be used to stabilize gunsights in tanks, anti-aircraft artillery on ships, and as the basis for older mechanically based inertial navigation systems.
