= Pilot direction indicator =

A pilot direction indicator or pilot's directional indicator (PDI) is an aircraft instrument used by bombardiers to indicate heading changes to the pilot in order to direct them to the proper location to drop bombs. The PDI is used in aircraft where the pilot and bombardier are physically separated and cannot easily see each other.

PDI's typically consist of a dial that is installed in the pilot's instrument set on the main console, with an arrow pointer than can be moved to indicate how far and in what direction to correct the heading. The bombardier typically has a switch to move the pointer to the right or left, and a repeater dial so he can see the setting.

The Norden bombsight was originally designed with the idea of automatically directing a PDI and thereby simplifying the bombardier's task.

== See also ==
- Index of aviation articles
