= Ruby Loftus Screwing a Breech-ring =

1943 painting by Laura Knight

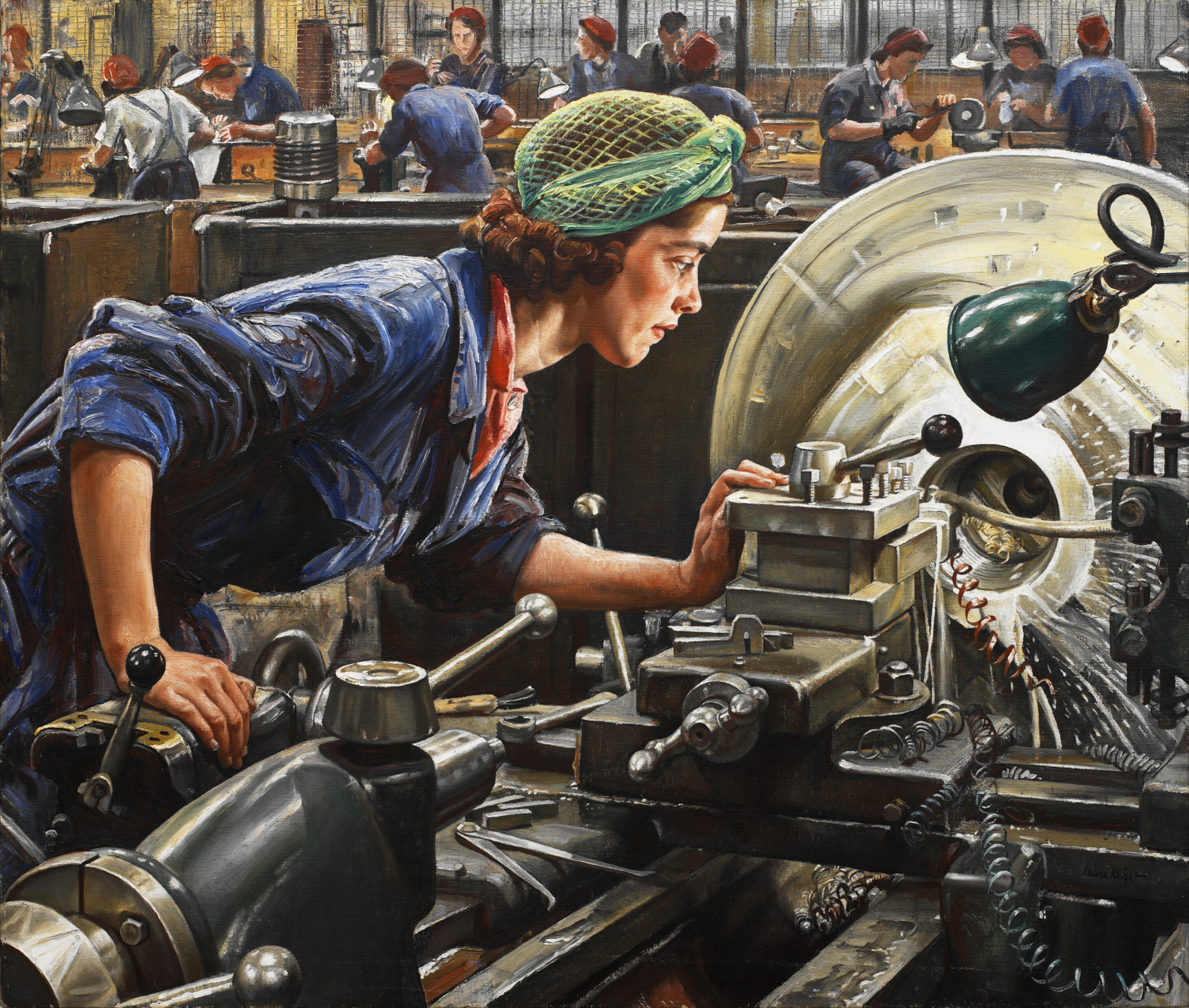
- Artist: Laura Knight
- Year: 1943
- Medium: Oil on canvas
- Dimensions: 86 cm × 100 cm (34 in × 40 in)
- Owner: Imperial War Museums

Ruby Loftus Screwing a Breech-ring is a 1943 oil on canvas painting by the British artist Dame Laura Knight. It depicts a young woman, Ruby Loftus, working at an industrial lathe cutting the screw of a breech-ring for a Bofors anti-aircraft gun. The painting was commissioned by the War Artists' Advisory Committee (WAAC) as part of the British war effort in the Second World War, particularly to encourage more women to work in factories. It is one of the largest pictures the WAAC commissioned and is in the realist style.

The painting shows Loftus, bent over a lathe, cutting the screw threads of the breech of a Bofors anti-aircraft gun. Women dominate the picture, and only one man is visible, in the background. Loftus was then 21 years old and had become an expert in the production of breech-rings—in seven months, rather than the several years it normally took. As she was too valuable to be released from her duties, Knight painted her in situ over three weeks at Royal Ordnance Factory No. 11 in Newport, south Wales.

When unveiled at the 1943 Royal Academy Summer Exhibition, the painting was extremely popular and was voted the picture of the exhibition. The image was reproduced in a large-scale poster version by the WAAC for display in factories across the country. As at 2026 the painting is held in the Imperial War Museums' collection.

== Background ==
During the Second World War the British government formed the War Artists' Advisory Committee (WAAC) under the chairmanship of Sir Kenneth Clark, the director of the National Gallery. The committee's terms of reference was "to draw up a list of artists qualified to record the war at home and abroad. In co-operation with the Services Departments, and other Government Departments ... to advise on the selection of artists on this list for war purposes and on the arrangements for their employment". The purpose was to use the art as propaganda; Clark also wished to ensure that artists were employed in artistic war work, limiting the chances of large numbers being conscripted and killed in action, as had happened in the First World War. The committee lasted until the end of 1945, by which time they had commissioned or acquired 5,570 works. One of those commissioned was the British painter Dame Laura Knight, who had painted for the Canadian government during the First World War.

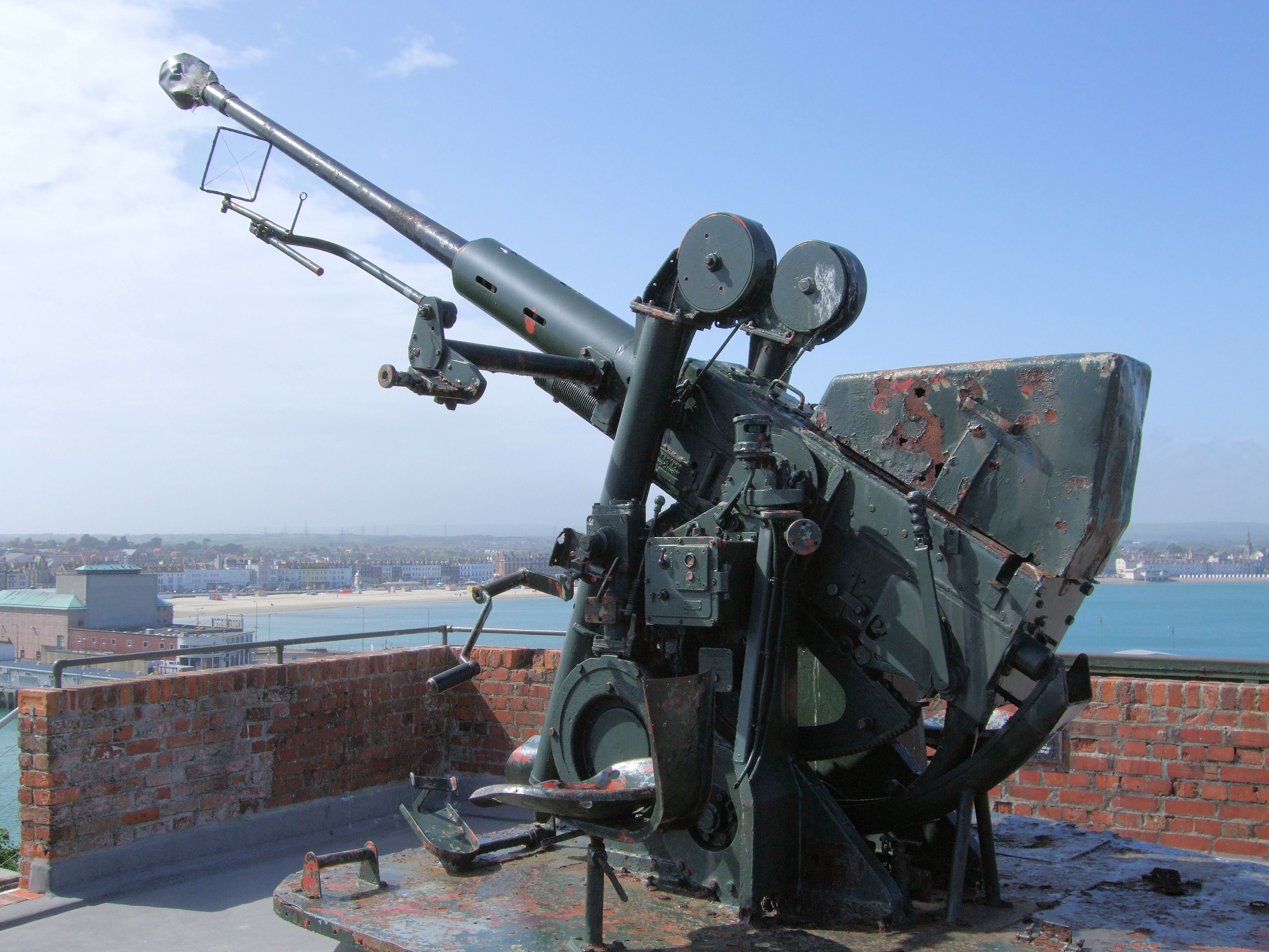
A Bofors 40 mm anti-aircraft gun; the breech is at the rear of the weapon, to the right in the photograph.

External image
- Front view of breech housing of Bofors gun

The enlistment of men into the armed services in the Second World War meant a dearth of men working in industry, including armaments factories. The National Service Act 1941 legalised the conscription of women for war work. The avenues for women were the Women's Land Army, the three women's auxiliary services—the Auxiliary Territorial Service, the Women's Auxiliary Air Force and the Women's Royal Naval Service (also known as the Wrens)—or to work in factories. The same year the government introduced Registration for Employment, which made it compulsory for women between the ages of nineteen and forty-five to register at local Employment Exchanges. (Note: The legislation allowed exceptions for women with children under fourteen who were living with them.) By 1943 ninety per cent of single women were engaged in war work, as were eighty per cent of married women.

According to the social research organisation Mass-Observation, women working in war production considered their abilities to be under-used, and that potential employers perceived factory girls to be "low class, rough, dirty and immoral". In particular, women were more likely to be absent from work than men, with childcare and running the household the probable reasons, according to the historian Penny Summerfield. With a shortage in the number of women working in the factories, the Ministry of Production pushed for the war artists to depict production workers, particularly given the number of working days lost because of strikes by factory workers around January 1943. The Ministry of Information also encouraged women to take up work in factories through propaganda films, including Jane Brown Changes her Job (1941) and Night Shift (1942).

Knight was commissioned to paint Ruby Loftus in late 1942. (Note: The art historian Brian Foss says Knight was commissioned in October 1942; the art historians Catherine Speck and Kathleen Palmer say it was in December.) Loftus was a machine operator described by the Ministry of Supply as "an outstanding factory worker". The ministries of supply and information passed Loftus's details to the WAAC as a possible subject for a portrait. Knight, who was working on A Balloon Site, Coventry, turned down the fee of 75 guineas, negotiating 100 guineas plus expenses; (Note: A guinea was originally a gold coin whose value was fixed at twenty-one shillings (£1.05). By this date the coin was obsolete and the term simply functioned as a label for that sum. According to calculations based on the Consumer Price Index measure of inflation, 75 guineas in 1942 is approximately £3,210 100 guineas from the same year is approximately £4,280 in 2025.) even the higher figure was, she said, "infinitely lower than I should ask for any other work than that connected to the war". (Note: Foss states that before the war Knight would have accepted commissions of about 400 guineas for a large canvas work (as the portrait of Loftus was). According to calculations based on the Consumer Price Index measure of inflation, 400 guineas in 1942 is approximately £17,110 in 2025.) Knight offered to accept the 75 guinea fee, but only if the work could be painted in her studio. The WAAC responded that, although they were grateful that she was working at a much lower level of fees than her pre-war rates, the policy was that all work commissioned was "on a virtually fixed scale of fees irrespective of the status of the artist". The committee added that as Loftus was too valuable to be released from the factory, they would agree to Knight's 100 guinea request; she travelled to Newport, Monmouthshire, to paint the portrait in situ over three weeks. The work was completed by the end of March.

Loftus was born in Llanhilleth, Blaenau Gwent, south Wales in 1921. The family moved to Finchley, London, when her father took a job with Shell-Mex. They moved back to south Wales after their home in Golders Green was bombed in the Blitz. She was employed by the Royal Ordnance Factory (ROF) No. 11 in Newport (ROF Newport), having previously been an assistant at a tobacconist's shop in Finchley. She was joined in her factory work by her sisters, Elsie and Queenie. In 1943 she was 21 years old and engaged to John Green, a lance corporal in the 11th Hussars. Loftus had no prior experience of heavy machinery or the industrial workplace, but she became highly skilled in seven months in making the breech-ring of the Bofors anti-aircraft gun. This was the most complex task at ROF Newport and any lack of precision in forming the breech-ring could result in the gun being destroyed when fired; the task was normally assigned to a worker with up to nine years' experience. Only two other women were trusted to make the breech-ring.

== Description ==
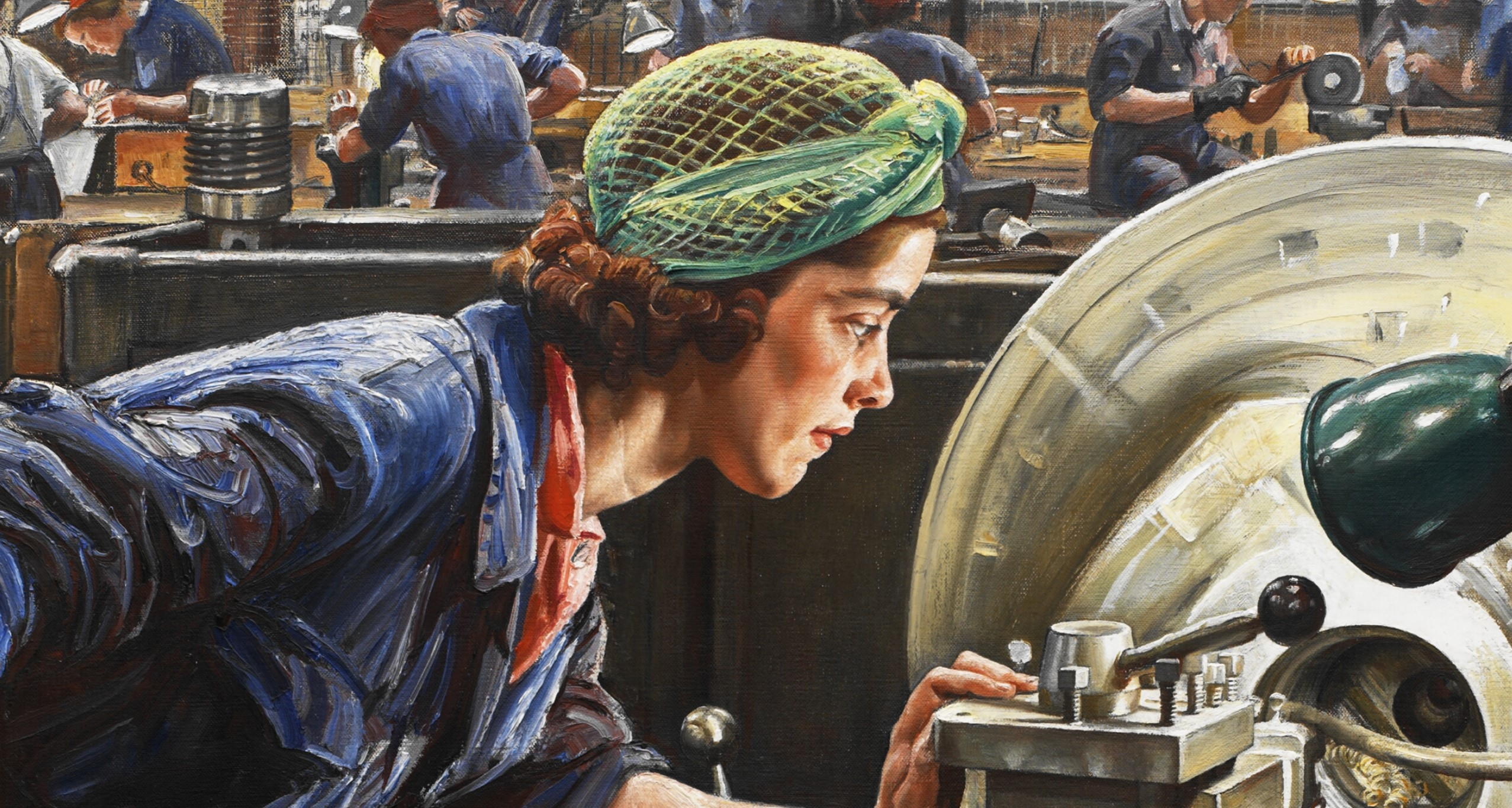
Detail showing Loftus's face focusing on her work

Ruby Loftus Screwing a Breech-ring is an oil painting on canvas measuring 86.3 by 101.9 centimetres (2.83 ft × 3.34 ft). It is one of the largest pictures of the wartime commissions, and the largest of the single-figure portraits the WAAC acquired. The painting is in the realist style; (Note: The art historians Teresa Grimes, Judith Collins and Oriana Baddeley consider it "heightened realism; the social historian Elizabeth de Cacqueray calls it "strongly realist".) the cultural historian Gillian Whiteley considers the painting resembles the works of the Soviet socialist realists, and provides "an authoritative, optimistic, heroic and popular inspirational image". According to the art historians Teresa Grimes, Judith Collins and Oriana Baddeley, Knight adopts what they call a "documentary approach" to the machinery that "has the verisimilitude of a photograph but makes a far more powerful impact". In this manner, the painting is similar to many examples of British wartime cinema that depicted the working class in an unsentimental manner.

The picture shows Loftus bent over the lathe, cutting the screw threads which would attach the barrel to the breech housing of the gun as sparks come off the metal. Her fingers rest on the machinery as she concentrates on the work she is doing. By leaning over the workbench her face is placed in the horizontal centre of the picture, accentuating her importance. Her face is highlighted with the reflection of the light shining on the wet metal. The social historian Elizabeth de Cacqueray observes that Loftus's head and the highlighted metal disk face each other along the diagonal of the picture, with Loftus's head scarf and face repeated ovals that reflect each other. According to the cultural historian Barbara Morden, Loftus is depicted as "a young and attractive woman", with brown curly hair not quite contained under a green headscarf or snood. She wears paint-spattered overalls and make-up, the latter emphasising her femininity.

According to the art historian Brian Foss, Loftus's workspace is "clean and efficient-looking", while the natural approach to the work—and the level of technical details captured in the picture—"had the desired effect of testifying to Loftus's exploit [of being expert at her work] being an indisputable fact". Foss and the art historian Lucy D. Curzon consider that the number of technical details in the picture draws the audience's attention at the expense of Loftus and her work. Curzon considers that because of this, "Loftus could raise morale and attract women to work where they were most needed, but without having any lasting effect on women's wartime roles or social position".

Ruby Loftus is similar to other works by Knight in showing a female worker focused on her work. The art historian Rosie Broadley considers much of the painting's power comes from Knight's ability to portray dynamic women at work. Bradley considers the work "an iconic image of British women's war effort". The art historian Catherine Speck writes that Loftus's feminine features and clean hands "affirm the temporary nature of ... [Loftus's] work 'for the duration'" of the war; in this way the painting feels to Speck more like a sanitised piece of propaganda, rather than an accurate reflection of Loftus going about her usual work.

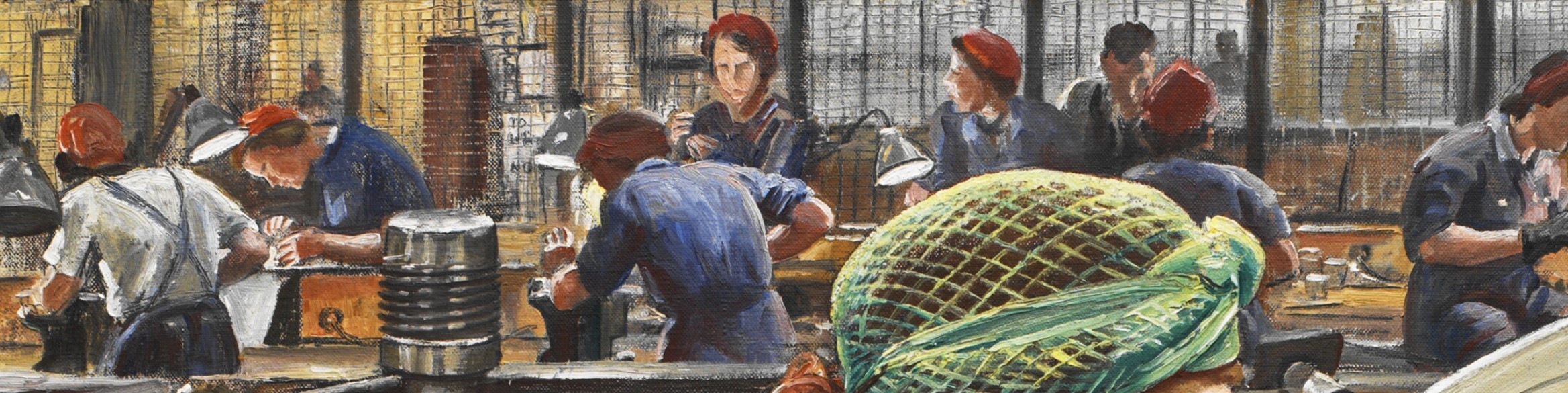
Detail of the background, showing one man among the working women; the patriotic colours of red, white and blue are repeated throughout.

The background of the painting shows the rest of factory floor, populated with women working at their benches; there is one man present, probably the foreman, given that he wears a tie. The clothing worn by the women carries a patriotic tone, according to the art historian Mike McKiernan, as reds, whites and blues—the colours of the Union Jack—dominate. According to the cultural historian Lindsey Robb, the painting—along with Frank Dobson's 1944 work An Escalator in an Underground Factory—"reinforces the representation of industrial work as female" during wartime.

== Reception ==
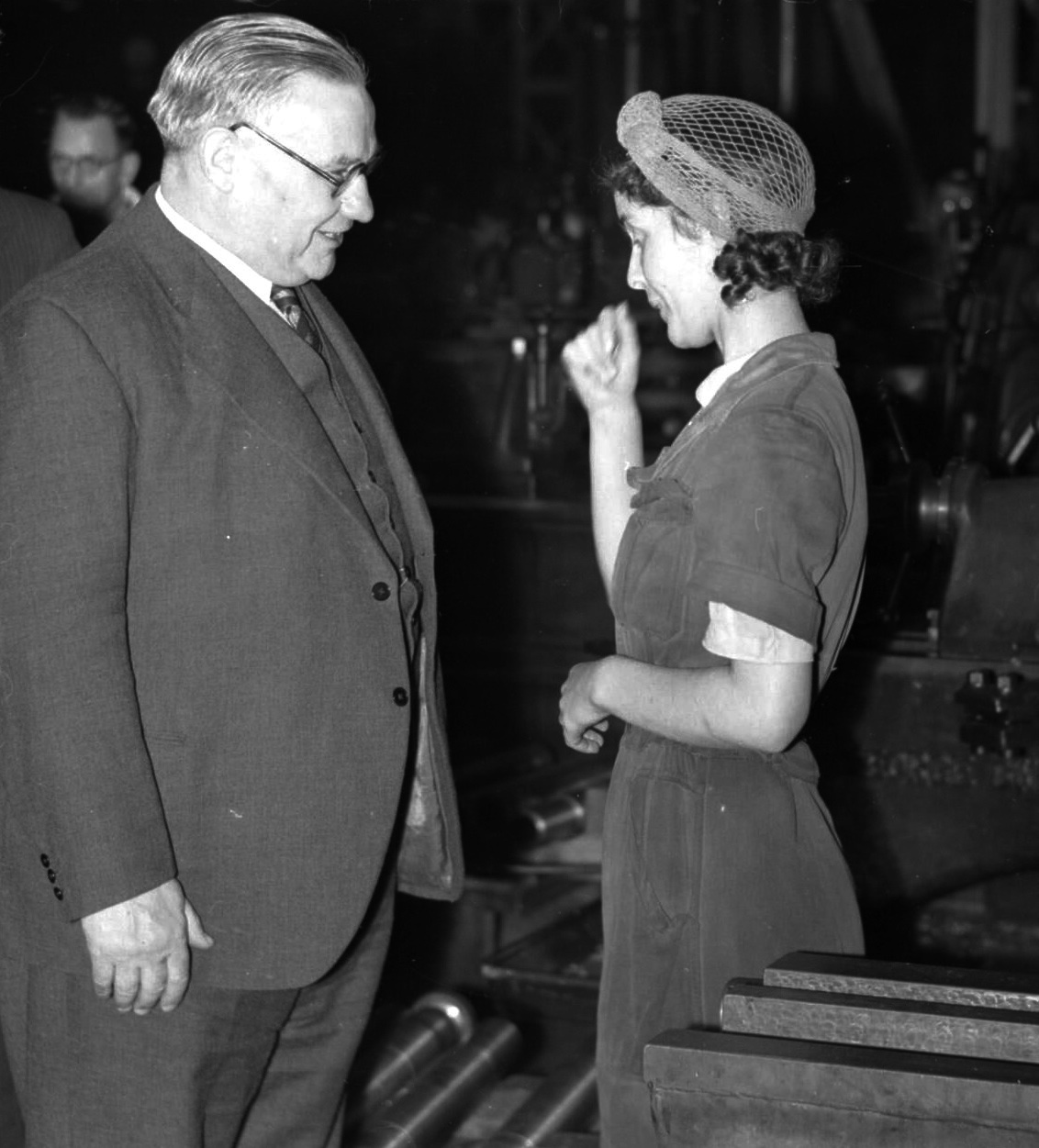
Loftus meets Ernest Bevin, the Minister of Labour, at ROF Newport, c. 1943

Ruby Loftus was exhibited at the Royal Academy Summer Exhibition on 30 April 1943. Loftus was present that day to see the picture, and was interviewed by the press about her involvement. The following day the painting was reproduced in several national newspapers. (Note: The picture was included in The Times, The Daily Mail, The Daily Mirror, The Daily Express, The Daily Sketch, The Daily Telegraph and The Daily Herald.) The critic for The Times thought the picture had "a certain brutal vigour", that made it "hard to take in all the detail without strain"; W. T. Oliver, writing in The Yorkshire Post found "little pleasure in Dame Laura's brand of realism", but admired "her energy, her disciplined thoroughness and conviction". Mea Allan, writing in The Daily Herald, praised the picture and wrote of Loftus: "To-day she is doing one of the most intricate operations in gun-making – one of the 'women-couldn't-do-it-jobs'."

While the art historian Ellena Matthews considers Knight's portrayal "singled out Loftus as a symbol of female achievement", Curzon observes that press reports emphasised Loftus's normality. In this way, she argues, Loftus "is disarmed as a threat to the patriarchal order of factory work and, generally, labour. Loftus is just a regular woman who works in an equally regular way – the fact that she performs a job previously done only by men with years of training is incidental at best". (Note: Curzon quotes by way of example the Ministry of Supply newsreel "R.O.F. Girl's Portrait is Picture of the Year", which described Loftus as "a typical British girl ... [who] served her country in wartime doing a job in the ordinary way done only by men with at least eight years' experience".)

A "Warwork News" newsreel featuring the painting, Knight and Loftus, was released into Britain's cinemas on 10 May 1943; Loftus found herself in the public eye and quickly famous from the coverage. Shop stewards from Woolwich Arsenal, disbelieving the stories of Loftus's prowess in the task, travelled to Newport to check on her skills. They returned satisfied.

Ruby Loftus was shown by the British Engineers' Association at the 1947 Engineering and Marine Exhibition at the Olympia Exhibition Centre. The picture was also reproduced in a large-scale poster version by the WAAC; it was displayed in factories across the country. It became one of the most well-known and popular works commissioned by the WAAC. Sending posters to factories was not a common step taken for WAAC works, and unparalleled in representations of male industrial labourers.

According to Grimes, Collins and Baddeley, the picture of Loftus doing what was traditionally a man's job helped to popularise a "new, active image of femininity". In this respect it has been likened to the American figure of "Rosie the Riveter"; Norman Rockwell's picture of Rosie appeared on 29 May 1943—a month after Ruby Loftus was first exhibited. According to Foss, "despite the similarity in their two names ... these two wartime icons could hardly be more different", with Loftus's femininity contrasting with Rosie's casual muscularity.

== Legacy ==
Loftus married her fiancé, Lance Corporal John Green, in September 1943 and took her husband's surname. After the war, she was offered an opportunity to take an engineering course, but decided against it and emigrated to Canada with her husband, eventually settling in Winfield, British Columbia. In British Columbia, she worked as an apple packer, in a post office and as a correspondent for a local newspaper. She travelled to London to see her portrait in the Imperial War Museum in May 1962, where she was accompanied by Knight. She was later diagnosed with multiple sclerosis. Loftus's husband died in 2003, and she died in June 2004 at the age of 83. In 2015 Loftus Garden Village, a housing development named after her, was built on the site of ROF Newport.

Looking back at the works Knight painted for the WAAC, Kenneth Clark wrote to her, "The pictures you have done for us have been an immense success from every point of view". The success of the painting led to further industrial commissions for Knight throughout the 1940s. In 1945 she painted Switch Works at Ellison Switchgear in Birmingham. This was followed by paintings of operations at the Dow Mac concrete railway-sleeper works and at the Skefko ball-bearing factory. In 1946 she visited Germany under the auspices of the Nuremberg war crimes trials where she painted The Nuremberg Trial.

The painting returned to Newport in 2006 for display as part of a project recording the recollections of women who had worked at the Royal Ordnance Factory there. Throughout 2013 and 2014 the painting was lent by the Imperial War Museum for display at the National Portrait Gallery, London, and then at the Plymouth City Museum and Art Gallery, as part of the Laura Knight Portraits exhibition. As at 2026 the painting is held in the Imperial War Museums' collection.

== See also ==
- Veronica Foster, popularly known as "Ronnie, the Bren Gun Girl", a Canadian factory worker
- Canary Girls, British women who worked in munitions
- Women in the workforce
- Women in the World Wars
- Bomb Girls

== Notes and references ==
=== Sources ===
==== Books ====
- Besly, Edward (1997). Loose Change: A Guide to Common Coins and Medals. Cardiff: National Museum Wales. ISBN 978-0-7200-0444-1.
- Broadley, Rosie (2013). Laura Knight: Portraits. London: National Portrait Gallery. ISBN 978-1-8551-4463-7.
- Chilvers, Ian (1998). A Dictionary of Twentieth-Century Art. Oxford: Oxford University Press. ISBN 978-0-1921-1645-1.
- Cook, Bernard A. (2006). Women and War: A Historical Encyclopedia from Antiquity to the Present. Santa Barbara, California: ABC-CLIO. ISBN 978-1-8510-9770-8.
- Curzon, Lucy D. (2026). Art and Citizenship in Conflict: British Women War Artists, 1939–45. Manchester: Manchester University Press. ISBN 978-1-5261-6512-1.
- Dunbar, Janet (1975). Laura Knight. London: Collins. ISBN 978-0-0021-1489-9.
- Edgerton, David (2011). Britain's War Machine: Weapons, Resources and Experts in the Second World War. Oxford University Press. ISBN 978-0-1998-3267-5.
- Foss, Brian (2007). War Paint: Art, War, State and Identity in Britain, 1939–1945. New Haven, Connecticut: Yale University Press. ISBN 978-0-3001-0890-3.
- Fox, Caroline (1988). Dame Laura Knight. Oxford: Phaidon Press. ISBN 978-0-7148-2447-5.
- Grimes, Teresa; Collins, Judith; Baddeley, Oriana (1991). Five Women Painters. Harpenden, Hertfordshire: Lennard. ISBN 978-1-8529-1101-0.
- Harries, Meirion; Harries, Susie (1983). The War Artists: British Official War Art of the Twentieth Century. London: M. Joseph in association with the Imperial War Museum and the Tate Gallery. ISBN 071812314X.
- Matthews, Ellena (2024). Home Front Heroism: Civilians and Conflict in Second World War London. Manchester: Manchester University Press. ISBN 978-1-5261-6212-0.
- Montgomery, Fiona (2006). Women's Rights: Struggles and Feminism in Britain c.1770-1970. Manchester: Manchester University Press. ISBN 978-0-7190-6954-3.
- Morden, Barbara C. (2013). Laura Knight: A Life. Pembroke Dock, Pembrokeshire: McNidder and Grace. ISBN 978-0-8571-6066-9.
- Palmer, Kathleen (2011). Women War Artists. London: Tate Gallery. ISBN 978-1-8543-7989-4.
- Robb, Lindsey (2017). "'Fighting In Their Ways'? The Civilian Man in British Culture, 1939–1945". In Crowley, Mark J.; Trudgen Dawson, Sandra (eds.). Home Fronts: Britain and the Empire at War, 1939–45. Woodbridge, Suffolk: Boydell Press. pp. 146–164. ISBN 978-1-7832-7225-9.
- Robb, Linsey (2015). Men at Work: The Working Man in British Culture, 1939–1945. Basingstoke, Hampshire: Palgrave Macmillan. ISBN 978-1-3495-6648-8.
- Spalding, Frances (1991). "The Modern Face 1918–1960". In Strong, Roy (ed.). The British Portrait 1660–1960. Woodbridge, Suffolk: Antique Collectors' Club. pp. 387–420. ISBN 978-1-8514-9107-0.
- Speck, Catherine (2014). Beyond the Battlefield: Women Artists of the Two World Wars. London: Reaktion Books. ISBN 978-1-7802-3384-0.
- Storey, Neil R. (2011). Women in the Second World War. Oxford: Shire Publications. ISBN 978-0-7478-0812-1.
- Summerfield, Penny (1988). "Women, War and Social Change: Women in Britain in World War II". In Marwick, Arthur (ed.). Total War and Social Change. Basingstoke, Hampshire: Macmillan. pp. 95–118. ISBN 978-0-3334-5590-6.
- Whiteley, Gillian (2011). "Re-presenting Reality, Recovering the Social: The Poetics and Politics of Social Realism and Visual Art". In Tucker, David (ed.). British Social Realism in the Arts since 1940. London: Palgrave Macmillan. pp. 132–171. ISBN 978-0-2303-0638-7.
- Wosk, Julie (2001). Women and the Machine: Representations from the Spinning Wheel to the Electronic Age. London and Baltimore, Maryland: JHU Press. ISBN 978-0-8018-7313-3.

==== Journals and magazines ====
- Carruthers, Susan L. (June 1990). "'Manning the Factories': Propaganda and Policy on the Employment of Women, 1939–1947". History. 75 (244): 232–256. JSTOR 24420973.
- de Cacqueray, Elizabeth (13 March 2012). "Painting the Second World War in Great Britain: A Selection of Women's Views". Revue LISA. X (1): 151–167. doi:10.4000/lisa.4899.
- Dunbar, Janet (2009). "Knight [née Johnson], Dame Laura (1877–1970)". Oxford Dictionary of National Biography (online ed.). Oxford University Press. doi:10.1093/ref:odnb/34349. (Subscription, Wikipedia Library access or UK public library membership required.)
- "Manpower-Control Policies in Great Britain". Monthly Labor Review. 55 (6): 1134–1141. 1942. JSTOR 41816993.
- McKiernan, Mike (18 August 2010). "Dame Laura Knight Ruby Loftus Screwing a Breech-ring 1943". Occupational Medicine. 60 (6): 421–422. doi:10.1093/occmed/kqq126. PMID 20719971.
- Summerfield, Penny; Crockett, Nicole (1992). "'You Weren't Taught That with the Welding': Lessons in Sexuality in the Second World War". Women's History Review. 1 (3): 435–454. doi:10.1080/09612029200200015.

==== News ====
- Allan, Mea (1 May 1943). "Ruby Loftus is a Smash Hit at Academy". The Daily Herald. p. 3.
- "Gallery Girl has Day Off to see her Portrait at the Academy". The Evening Despatch. 30 April 1943. p. 1.
- Hamilton, Adrian (22 July 2013). "Human Touch: Laura Knight's NPG Show is a Timely Reminder of her Talent". The Independent.
- "Iconic War Painting Returns Home". BBC. 22 July 2006.
- Oliver, W. T. (1 May 1943). "Royal Academy's Restfulness, A Refreshing Exhibition". The Yorkshire Post. p. 1.
- "The Royal Academy". The Times. 1 May 1943. p. 5.

==== Websites ====
- Clark, Gregory (2023). "The Annual RPI and Average Earnings for Britain, 1209 to Present (New Series)". MeasuringWorth. Archived from the original on 1 April 2023.
- "Loftus Garden Village: News". Loftus Garden Village. Archived from the original on 26 November 2016.
- "Loftus Garden Village: The Story". Loftus Garden Village. Archived from the original on 21 February 2014.
- "Royal Academy Portrait of Girl". The British Universities and Colleges Film and Video Council.
- "Ruby Loftus: Before the War". Wartime Newport. Newport Museum and Art Gallery.
- "Ruby Loftus: In the Factory". Wartime Newport. Newport Museum and Art Gallery.
- "Ruby Loftus Screwing a Breech-ring". Imperial War Museums.
- "Ruby, Ruby, Ruby!". Royal Commission on the Ancient and Historical Monuments of Wales.
- "The Secret Purpose of the War Artists Advisory Committee". Imperial War Museums.
