= Take off =

Take off commonly refers to:

- Takeoff, the aircraft flight phase in which a vehicle goes from the ground to flying in the air
- Parody, a creative work designed to imitate, comment on, and/or make fun of its subject by means of satiric or ironic imitation

Take off, Take Off or Takeoff may also refer to:

== Films ==
- Takeoff (film), a 1979 Soviet drama film
- Take Off (2009 film), a South Korean film
- Take Off (2017 film), a Malayalam film directed by Mahesh Narayanan

== Music ==
=== Albums and EPs ===
- Take Off (iKon album), 2023
- Take Off, an album by Thee Shams, 2001
- The Take Off, an album by Solid Base, 1998
- Take Off (Folks EP), 2013
- Take Off (WayV EP), 2019
- Take Off, an EP by GreatGuys, 2018

=== Songs ===
- "Take Off" (2PM song), 2011
- "Take Off" (Bob and Doug McKenzie song), 1981
- "Take Off" (Chipmunk song), 2011
- "Take-off" (Vivid song), 2010
- "Take Off" (Young Dro song), 2009
- "Take Off", by Hooligan Hefs, Scndl and Sunset Bros, 2021
- "Take Off", by Perfume from Triangle, 2009

=== Other music ===
- Takeoff (rapper) (1994–2022), American rapper

== Other uses ==
- Takeoff (construction), a term used for materials and quantities estimation
- Take Off (painting), a 1943 painting by Laura Knight
- Take-off (book), a 1994 essay collection by Daniele Del Giudice
- Take Off with Bradley & Holly, 2019 BBC TV Gameshow
- Take Off! (game), a 1988 board game
- Takeoff!, a 1980 collection of humorous material by Randall Garrett

== See also ==
- Taking Off (disambiguation)
- Take It Off (disambiguation)
