= A Balloon Site, Coventry =

1942 painting by Laura Knight

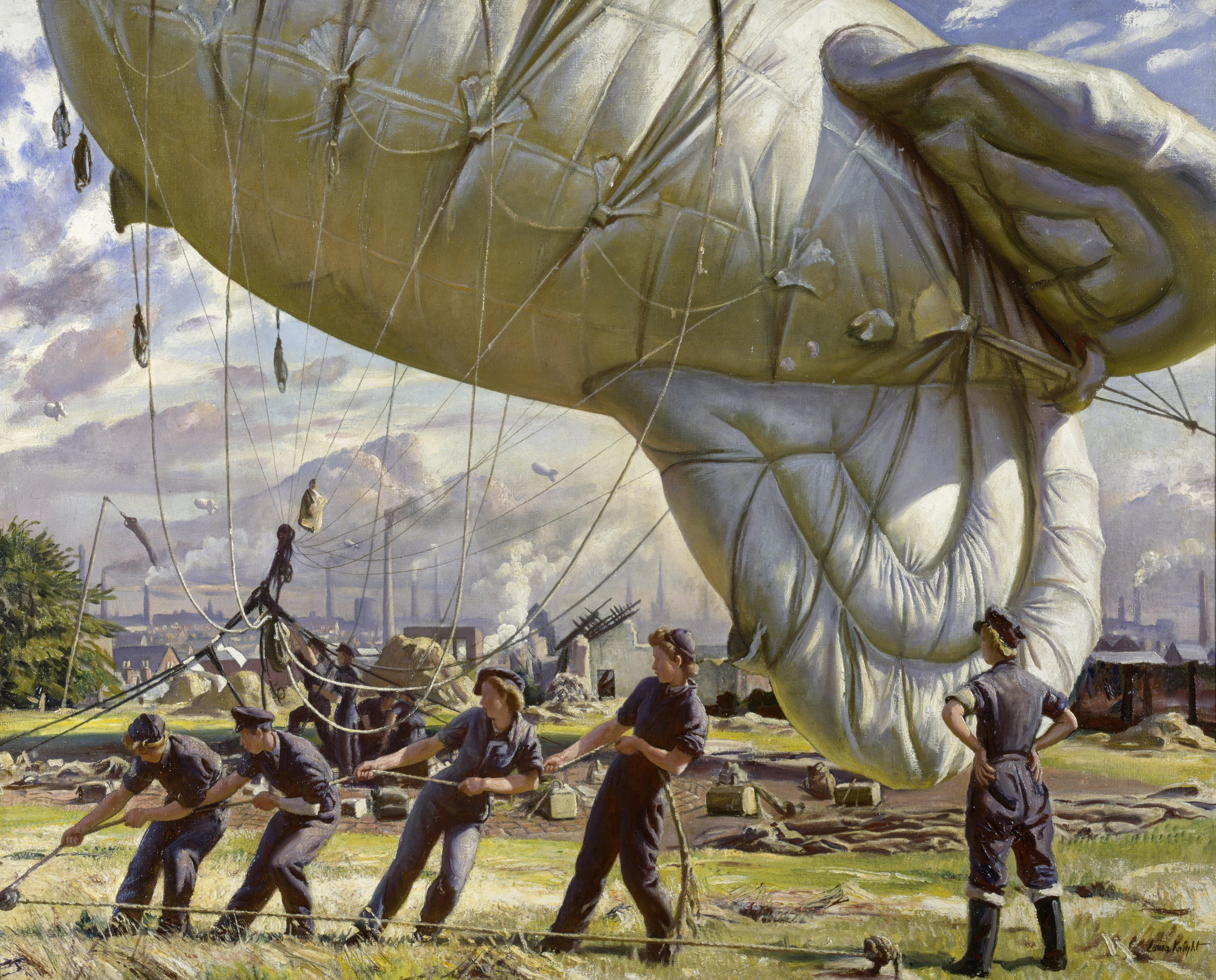
- Artist: Laura Knight
- Year: 1943
- Medium: Oil on canvas
- Dimensions: 102.5 cm × 127 cm (40.4 in × 50 in)
- Location: Imperial War Museum, London

A Balloon Site, Coventry is an oil-on-canvas painting undertaken in 1942 by the British artist Laura Knight. It portrays a group of people—mostly women—working to launch a barrage balloon on the outside of Coventry, an industrial city in the Midlands that was the target of a German bombing raid in November 1940, when over 10,000 incendiary bombs were dropped on the city.

Knight had painted In for Repairs, showing members of the Women's Auxiliary Air Force (WAAF) repairing a damaged barrage balloon, in early 1942. The Air Ministry was so impressed that they asked her to paint the WAAF in action. She was commissioned by the War Artists' Advisory Committee (WAAC) and paid 100 guineas for the work, which was undertaken in July and August 1942. A Balloon Site was displayed at the 1943 Royal Academy Summer Exhibition, along with Ruby Loftus Screwing a Breech-ring (1943).

== Background ==
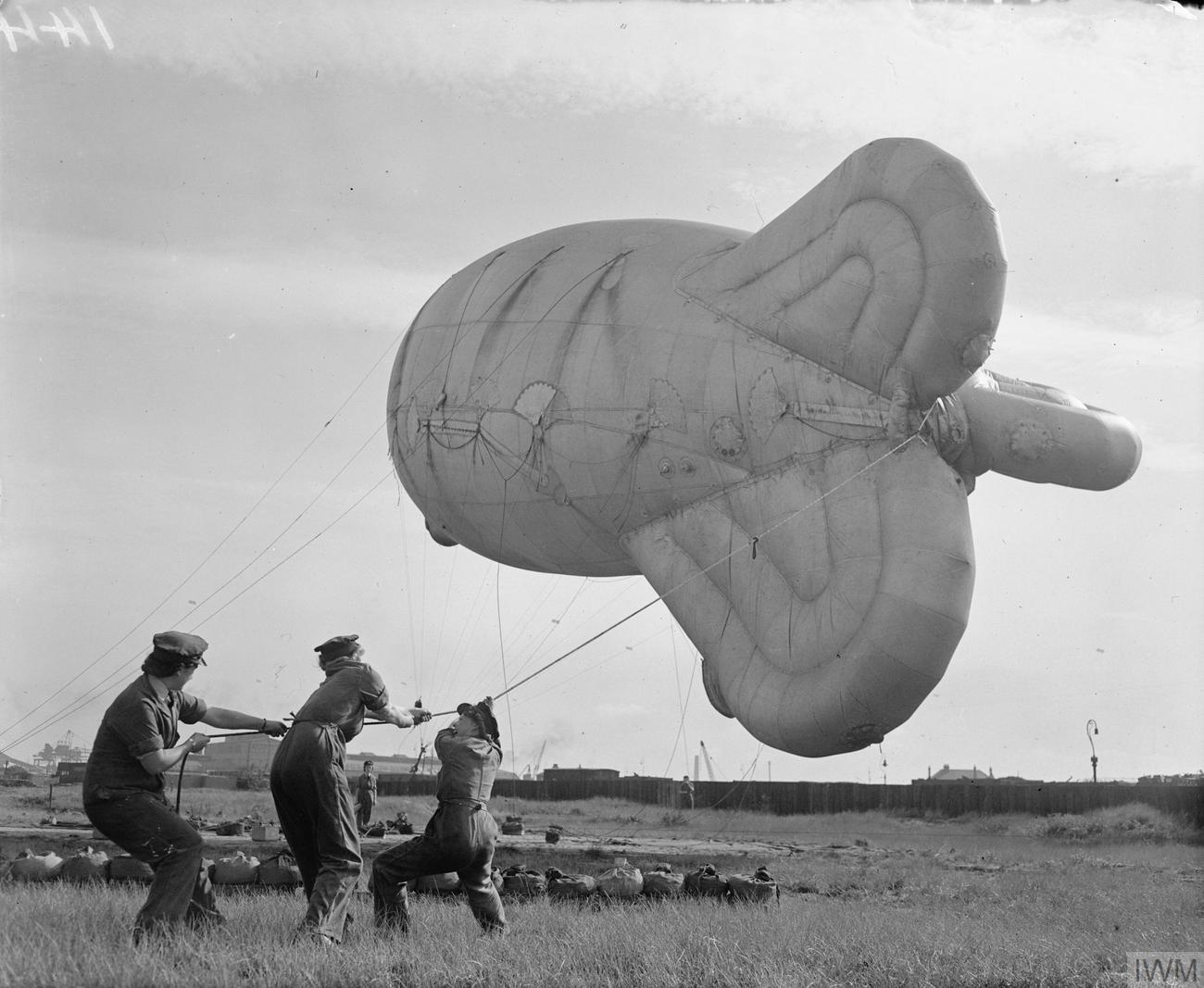
Members of the Women's Auxiliary Air Force hauling in a kite balloon at a coastal site.

From March 1939, Coventry had been protected by barrage balloons; the city was an industrial target and contained aircraft factories on the outskirts. The balloons were filled with hydrogen and were either set in fixed sites, or adapted for mobile deployment. They were fixed by steel cables which forced bombers to fly at a higher altitude than they would have preferred. In this way the bombing was less accurate, and the aeroplanes more vulnerable to ground-based anti-aircraft fire. The protection was not infallible, and, on 14 November 1940 Coventry was the target of a German bombing raid when over 10,000 incendiary bombs were dropped on the city. From April 1941 women were used to operate the balloons, a crew of fourteen women replacing the ten men that did so previously.

== History ==
During the Second World War the British government formed the War Artists' Advisory Committee (WAAC) under the chairmanship of Sir Kenneth Clark, the director of the National Gallery. The committee was "to draw up a list of artists qualified to record the war at home and abroad". One of those commissioned on several occasions was the British painter Laura Knight, who had painted for the Canadian government during the First World War. By early 1942 she had painted four pictures for the WAAF; the most recent was In for Repairs, showing members of the Women's Auxiliary Air Force (WAAF) repairing a damaged barrage balloon. The Air Ministry was impressed with the picture and its potential to help with recruiting. The Ministry asked the WAAF if Knight could be commissioned again, and, in October 1941, she received a request from Mr Dickey, the Secretary of the WAAC, to paint members of the Women's Auxiliary Air Force based at RAF Wythall—the regional headquarters of RAF Balloon Command—which was six miles (ten kilometres) from Birmingham. She worked on the piece in July and August 1942, and was paid 100 guineas for the work.

A Balloon Site was displayed at the 1943 Royal Academy Summer Exhibition, as was Ruby Loftus Screwing a Breech-ring, a painting Knight had just completed. Both works were warmly received. As at 2026, the painting is held by the Imperial War Museum.

== Painting ==
A Balloon Site is an oil painting on canvas measuring 102.5 by 127 centimetres (3.36 ft × 4.17 ft). It shows the launch of a barrage ballon on the outskirts of Coventry. In the middle distance are several damaged buildings, and the partial ruins of Coventry shown in the background. In the foreground two groups work on launching the balloon. The group in the foreground—composed of three women and a man—are under the leadership of Jean Brydon, a female sergeant. A second group are shown on the far side of the balloon.

According to the art historians Teresa Grimes, Judith Collins and Oriana Baddeley, A Balloon Site and In For Repairs "are about activity, the concentration and absorption in work generated by a group endeavour are central to their composition".

== Notes and references ==
=== Sources ===
==== Books ====
- Chilvers, Ian (1998). A Dictionary of Twentieth-Century Art. Oxford: Oxford University Press. ISBN 978-0-1921-1645-1.
- Foss, Brian (2007). War Paint: Art, War, State and Identity in Britain, 1939-1945. New Haven, CT: Yale University Press. ISBN 978-0-300-10890-3.
- Grimes, Teresa; Collins, Judith; Baddeley, Oriana (1991). Five Women Painters. Harpenden, Herts: Lennard. ISBN 978-1-85291-101-0.
- Hill, Maureen (2010). The Blitz on Britain: Day by Day, the Headlines as They Were Made. London: Transatlantic Press. ISBN 978-1-9071-7671-5.
- Lambourne, Nicola (2001). War Damage in Western Europe: the Destruction of Historic Monuments During the Second World War. Edinburgh: Edinburgh University Press. ISBN 978-0-7486-1286-4.
- McGrory, David (2015). Coventry's Blitz. Stroud, Gloucestershire: Amberley Publishing. ISBN 978-1-4456-5000-5.
- Morden, Barbara C. (2013). Laura Knight: A Life. Pembroke Dock, Pembrokeshire: McNidder and Grace. ISBN 978-0-85716-066-9.
- Speck, Catherine (2014). Beyond the Battlefield: Women Artists of the Two World Wars. London: Reaktion Books. ISBN 978-1-78023-384-0.
- Wosk, Julie (2001). Women and the Machine: Representations from the Spinning Wheel to the Electronic Age. Baltimore, MD: Johns Hopkins University Press. ISBN 978-0-8018-7313-3.

==== Journals and magazines ====
- Dunbar, Janet (2009). "Knight [née Johnson], Dame Laura (1877–1970)". Oxford Dictionary of National Biography (online ed.). Oxford University Press. doi:10.1093/ref:odnb/34349. (Subscription, Wikipedia Library access or UK public library membership required.)

==== News ====
- "Coventry Scene an Academy Success". Coventry Evening Telegraph. 6 May 1943. p. 1.

==== Websites ====
- "A Balloon Site, Coventry". Imperial War Museums.
- "A Balloon Site, Coventry 1943". Dame Laura Knight.
