= ROF Newport =

British munitions factory

Coordinates: 51.582°N 2.974°W

Royal Ordnance Factory Newport, commonly known as ROF Newport, was a World War II munitions factory in Wales that produced guns. The factory began construction in 1940 and was completed within a year, producing its first weapons by January 1941. The site employed around 2,000 people during the war in the manufacture of anti-tank and anti-aircraft weapons; one of the main weapons built at the factory was the Bofors 40 mm gun.

Laura Knight's wartime painting Ruby Loftus Screwing a Breech-ring was created at the site, with factory worker Ruby Loftus being the subject.

== History ==
The Newport Royal Ordnance Factory began construction in April 1940 on the empty site of a former allotment site near Corporation Road, Newport. The site was designated Royal Ordnance Factory No. 11 officially but became commonly known as ROF Newport. On 7 November that year, the factory was opened by Sir Charles Northrup McLaren, the Director General of Ordnance Factories. Upon its opening, 120 women applied for roles at the factory with 75 eventually being hired. The workers were also provided with new homes that had been specifically built for the factory workers. The workers underwent a year of basic training.

Less than a year after construction began, production of the first gun at the factory was completed in January 1941. Under the Lend-Lease initiative created by the United States to supply Allied nations with support during wartime, machines used to build weapons were delivered to ROF Newport to begin production. One of the main weapons built at the factory was the Bofors 40 mm gun.

Staff at the site worked ten hour shifts, alternating fortnightly between day and nights shifts, with a one-hour break for meals. The factory grounds also had its own vegetable patch, while pigs and hens were also kept to provide the workers with fresh meat and eggs. The workers also set up several sports clubs amongst themselves. Between 1941 and 1945, the factory employed around 2,000 men and women.

After the war, the site was decommissioned and taken over by Standard Telephones and Cables. The building was later demolished.

== In popular culture ==
The wartime painting Ruby Loftus Screwing a Breech-ring by Laura Knight was created at ROF Newport. The work features a munitions worker named Ruby Loftus working on a Bofors breech, used in the creation of anti-tank and anti-aircraft guns. When the site was redeveloped in the 21st century, part of the new housing estate was named after Loftus. The factory was also used to make the 1942 Paul Rotha film Nightshift that was screened around Britain.

In 2015, an animated film based on the workers of the site was made and showcased at several international film festivals. Entitled, Newport Gun Girls, it was financed by money donated by the National Lottery.
