= Ella Naper =

British artist (1886–1972)

- Born: Ella Louise Champion; 9 February 1886; Charlton, London
- Died: 1972 (aged 85–86)
- Known for: Jewellery design, painting
- Spouse: Charles Naper

Ella Louise Naper (née Champion; 9 February 1886 – 1972) was an English jeweller, potter, designer and painter.

== Biography ==
Naper was born in Charlton, one of the nine children of Alfred Champion, a fireman, and Mary Ann Champion. She attended the Camberwell School of Arts and Crafts from 1904 to 1906. There, under the jeweller Frederick James Partridge, she learned a wide range of techniques for working in metal, wood, and enamel. She was heavily influenced by Art Nouveau design and the work of C. R. Ashbee. In 1906 she went to Branscombe, Devon, where Partridge rented some cottages for his students. There she met the architect and painter Charles Naper, whom she married in 1910. The couple spent two years in Looe, Cornwall, before making their permanent home at Trewoofe in Lamorna. The couple became active members of the artists colony known as the Newlyn School.

Ella Naper worked from home producing decorative enamel and horn work jewellery. Her jewellery designs included silver brooches, necklaces and earrings and also combs and hair slides. She included patterns based on plants, flowers and insects in her work, often in art nouveau styles. She sold much of her work through events such as Arts and Crafts Exhibition, Woman's Art Exhibition, Liberty's in London and, after 1924, Newlyn Art Gallery craft exhibitions. During the First World War, Ella Naper and Laura Knight collaborated on the design of several pieces of painted jewellery and enamel plaques, including Two Dancers (1912). In 1915, Naper and Knight exhibited several of these pieces in a joint exhibition, with Lamorna Birch, held at the London Fine Art Society. Naper received commissions for mayoral chains and war memorials, including one in Exeter Cathedral and also designed the memorial to the artist Benjamin Leader in St Buryan's Church. From the early 1920s Naper, together with Kate Westrup and Emily Westrup, ran the Lamorna Pottery, which continued in production until 1935.

Naper was also a talented painter, often working in watercolours. She exhibited at the Walker Art Gallery on at least twenty-one occasions and also at the International Society of Sculptors, Painters and Gravers and at Royal Society of British Artists. Naper was the subject of several paintings by other artists living in Lamorna, including her husband Charles Naper, Ruth Simpson, and Harold Knight. She is one of the models in Harold Harvey's painting The Critics (1922) and was also painted by, and produced some work with, Gluck. Naper features in several works by Laura Knight, including Spring (1916–1920) and is the model Knight is seen painting in Self Portrait with Nude (1913).
