= Kate Westrup =

British artist (1885-1928)

Ethel Kate Westrup (1885–1928) was a British artist, notable as both a painter and ceramicist.

== Biography ==
Westrup was born, and raised, at Hornsey in north London, into a family of at least eight children. No record of a formal art education for Westrup has been identified but it is known that around 1911 she moved, with her artist sister Emily (1870–1960), to Lamorna in Cornwall. Kate Westrup produced oil paintings and drawings, often of animal subjects, and had works shown at the Royal Academy in London, with the New English Art Club and in 1912 exhibited chalk drawings of dogs at the Alpine Club. She contributed illustrations to the 1914 Punch Book of Hunting. Westrup was elected an associate member of the Society of Women Artists in 1923. In the early 1920s, with Ella Naper, Westrup founded the Lamorna Pottery company which produced a variety of ceramics and domestic items. These products were sold through gallery outlets locally and in Manchester, Liverpool and elsewhere. The company closed after Westrup's death in 1928.
