= Taking Off =

Taking Off may refer to:

== Music ==
=== Albums ===
- Taking Off (Neil Innes album), 1977
- Taking Off (David Sanborn album), 1975
- Taking Off (soundtrack), the soundtrack album to the film
- Taking Off!, a 2013 album by The Wiggles
- Takin' Off, album by Herbie Hancock

=== Other music ===
- "Taking Off" (song), a 2004 song by The Cure
- "Taking Off", a song by One Ok Rock from the album Ambitions

== Other uses ==
- Takeoff, a phase of flight in which an aircraft transitions from ground to air
- Taking Off (film), a 1971 film comedy

== See also ==
- Take off (disambiguation)
