= Teresa Margolles =

Mexican conceptual artist (born 1963)

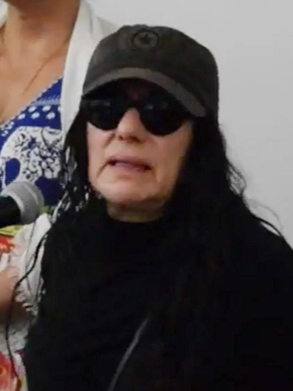
- Margolles in 2012
- Born: Teresa Margolles; 1963 (age 62–63); Culiacán, Sinaloa, Mexico
- Education: National Autonomous University of Mexico
- Known for: Photography; Videography; Performance art Conceptual art
- Awards: Prince Claus Award (2012); Artes Mundi (2012)

Teresa Margolles (born 1963 in Culiacán) is a Mexican conceptual artist, photographer, videographer, and performance artist. As an artist she researches the social causes and consequences of death.

Margolles communicates observations from the morgue in her home city, Mexico City, and other morgues located in Latin America, as well as the extended emotional distress and social consequences that occur as product of death by murder. While working around the topic of the body, her work extends to the families of the victims, the remaining living bodies that witness the death of a loved one.

The main medium of her work comes from the morgues themselves, which she transforms into sensory experiences that provoke a feeling of memory to the audience. Margolles finds particularly remarkable how the activity inside the morgues reflects the truth from the outside. In the case of Mexico City, she observes that the majority of victims belong to the lower classes. "Looking at the dead you see society".

== Life and career ==
Margolles grew up in Sinaloa, where she was exposed to violence and death at a young age. As a teenager, she joined her sister in moving to Mexico City for school. Although interested in photography, she decided to study political science. She then became interested in forensic science after beginning to hang out with trainee doctors studying at the medical school next door.

Margolles was originally trained as a forensic pathologist, and holds academic degrees in science communication and forensic medicine from the Universidad Nacional Autonoma de Mexico, Mexico City. She also conducted art studies at the Direccion de Fomento a la Cultura Regional del Estado de Sinaloa, Culiacan, Mexico.

For her the morgue reflects society, particularly Mexican urban experience, where drug-related crime, poverty, political upheaval, and military action have resulted in violence and death;

"The work of Teresa Margolles has always taken the human body and its liquid components as protagonists; they serve as vehicles for a relentless indictment of the growing violence in the world at large and in her own native country in particular, namely Mexico." Letizia Ragaglia, 2011 "When I was working with SEMEFO I was very interested in what was happening inside the morgue and the situations that were occurring, let's say, a few meters outside the morgue, among family members and relatives. But Mexico has changed so violently that it's no longer possible to describe what's happening outside from within the morgue. The pain, loss and emptiness are now found in the streets." Teresa Margolles, 2009

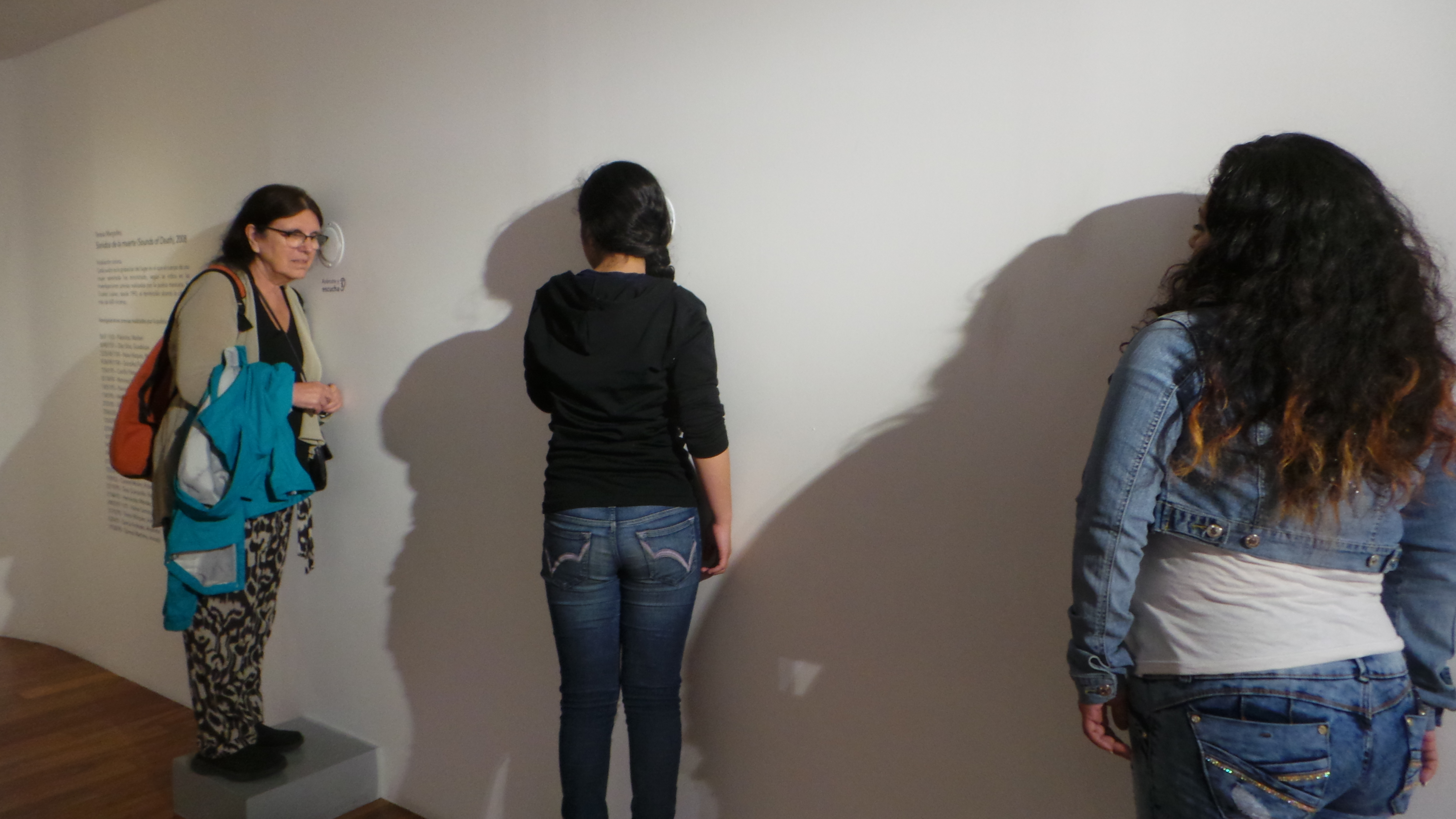
Visitors interacting with 'Escuchando los Sonidos de la muerte, by visual artist Teresa Margolles.

In 1990, Margolles founded an artists' collective titled SEMEFO, which is an anagram for the Mexican coroner's office. The collective used "the detritus of murder investigations to confront violence in the country". Other core members of SEMEFO included Arturo Angulo and Carlos Lopez, yet the group had a loose membership. Through performance and installation-based work, SEMEFO commented on social violence and death in Mexico.

Margolles left SEMEFO in the late 1990s. Since then her independent art practice continues to explore themes of death, violence and exclusion, specifically using forensic material and human remains. She uses materials retrieved from the morgue where she has her studio, such as the water used to wash corpses, which she uses as the foundation for her work;

"The water comes from Mexico City’s morgue. It’s water used to wash the bodies of murder victims." Teresea Margolles, 2006

One of Teresa Margolles’ first solo exhibitions to reach a larger audience was her show in the Museum Für Moderne Kunst in Frankfurt, Germany titled Muerte Sin Fin (Death Without End) in 2004. In this interactive, installation-based art, Margolles uses her usual materials from the morgue to draw attention to death, to the anonymous corpses resulting from violent killings in Mexico City, and to people’s inclination to disassociate from death and dying. Within this exhibit, there are seven components that each help to convey Margolles’ message about the importance of death, reinforcing its gravity and facing it head on. The first installation is titled En el aire, a hallway full of soap bubbles from a machine that creates a bright, peaceful atmosphere, but in reality, it’s made from the water used to wash the bodies before an autopsy in the morgue. It demonstrates a reminder about how fragile life can be while also affirming one’s own consciousness and awareness of death. A well-known part of this exhibit named Papeles, features rows of varying shades of water colored paper that also incorporates the water used in the morgue, but has blood and fat from the bodies shown as well. Margolles creates these as a type of portrait, making a physical memento of these lives that were lost.

In 2009, she brought the show "What Else Could We Speak About" to the Mexico pavilion of the Venice Biennale. The show explored how the drug industry in Mexico has interacted with violence and murder. Pieces in the show included the flag hanging outside the Mexico pavilion, which was dyed with blood from crimes scenes, and jewelry made with glass from shattered windows.

In 2023 she was invited to participate in the 16th Cuenca Biennale, in Ecuador, curated by Ferran Barenblit, where she presented the piece "El poder".

In 2024, Margolles installed “Mil Veces un Instante (A Thousand Times in an Instant)” on the Fourth plinth in Trafalgar Square, London. The piece consists of a 3.3-metric-ton cube, which is covered in 726 face masks taken from Brazilian and British "trans, nonbinary and gender nonconforming people," many of whom are sex workers. It references tzompantl and is dedicated to Margolles' friend Karla La Borrada, a transgender woman who was murdered in Juárez in 2015. The Guardian praised the piece as a "haunting" memorial that "emulates the melancholy dignity of London’s older public art".

== Awards ==
In 2012 she was honored with a Prince Claus Award from the Netherlands and the 5th Artes Mundi prize for international contemporary art.

She exhibits worldwide and has two works in the Tate collection; Flag I, a version of a work shown at the Venice Biennale in 2009 when Margolles represented Mexico, and 37 Bodies, which memorializes Mexican murder victims with short pieces of surgical thread knotted together to form a single line. Her work is included in the main curated exhibition of the 2019 Venice Biennale "May You Live in Interesting Times".

In 2016 she was a part of the Current:LA Biennial made by the Department of Cultural Affairs in the city of Los Angeles.

== Solo and significant group exhibitions ==
Margolles has been presenting in venues all over the world.

- 2004: Museum für Moderne Kunst, Frankfurt am Main, Germany
- 2005: Guggenheim Museum, New York, U.S.
- 2008: Kunsthalle Krems, Krems an der Donau, Austria
- 2009: Venice Biennale (Mexican pavilion), Italy
- 2010: Fridericianum, Kassel, Margolles, Teresa. Frontera
- 2010: Los Angeles County Museum of Art (LACMA), Los Angeles, U.S.
- 2010: Sala de Arte Público Siqueiros (SAPS), Mexico City, Mexico
- 2011: MUSEION, Bolzano, Italy
- 2012: Lion Arts Centre, Adelaide, Australia
- 2012: El Museo Universitario Arte Contemporáneo (MUAC), Mexico City, Mexico
- 2014: Centro de Arte Dos de Mayo, Madrid, Spain
- 2014: Migros Museum für Gegenwartskunst, Zurich, Switzerland
- 2015: Neuberger Museum of Art, New York, U.S.
- 2016: Galerie Peter Kilchmann, Zurich, Switzerland
- 2016: Colby College Museum of Art, Waterville, Maine, U.S.
- 2018: Padiglione D'Arte Contemporanea (PAC), Milan, Italy
- 2019: The Gift of Art, Pérez Art Museum Miami, Florida
- 2019: Venice Biennale
- 2024: Fourth plinth in Trafalgar Square, London.

== Public Collections (selection) ==
The work of Teresa Margolles is featured in international collections around the world. Installations and examples of her artistic practice are held in permanent collections at

- Pérez Art Museum Miami, Florida
- Princeton University Art Museum, New Jersey
- Museum of Modern Art, New York
- Centre Pompidou, Paris
- Colección Jumex, Mexico City
- Museum für Moderne Kunst, Frankfurt, Germany
- Tate Modern, London, United Kingdom

== Literature ==
- Kittelmann, Udo & Klaus Görner (2004) Teresa Margolles. Muerte sin fin, Ostfildern-Ruit, ISBN 978-3-7757-1473-0 (in Spanish)
- Margolles, Teresa (2011) Margolles, Teresa. Frontera, Walther König, Cologne, ISBN 978-3-86560-976-2 (in Spanish)
- Downey, Anthony (2009) "127 Cuerpos: Teresa Margolles and the Aesthetics of Commemoration", Lund Humphries, London, ISBN 978-1-84822-016-4
- Scott Bray, R (2007) "En piel ajena: The work of Teresa Margolles" Law Text Culture 11(1), pgs. 13–50, URL: https://ro.uow.edu.au/ltc/vol11/iss1/2/
- Downey, Anthony (2012) "In the Event of Death: Teresa Margolles and the Life of the Corpse", in Artes Mundi 5, pp. 62–66
- Heartney, Eleanor; Posner; Princenthal; Scott (2013) The Reckoning: Women Artists of the New Millennium, published by Prestel Verlag, pp. 206 – 213, [[ISBN|ISBN 978-3-7913-4759-2]]
- Sileo, Diego. (2019) Teresa Margolles: Ya Basta Hijos de Puta, Silvana Editorale, ISBN 978-8836639168
- Baddeley, Oriana (2007) 'Teresa Margolles and the Pathology of Everyday Death.' Dardo, 5. pp. 60–81. ISSN 1886-0893
