= Self Portrait with Nude =

Painting by Laura Knight

- Artist: Laura Knight
- Year: 1913
- Medium: Oil on canvas
- Dimensions: 152.4 cm × 127.6 cm (60.0 in × 50.2 in)
- Location: National Portrait Gallery; London

Self Portrait with Nude (sometimes known as Self Portrait or The Model) is an oil-on-canvas painting executed in 1913 by the English artist Laura Knight. A mature work, painted when Knight was 36 years old, it was controversial for its subject matter: a female artist painting a nude female life model. The painting was retained by Knight until her death in 1970, and bought by the National Portrait Gallery in 1971: the gallery has described it as "a bravura statement about the ability of women to paint hitherto taboo subjects on a scale and with an intensity, that heralds changes".

The painting shows a view of the artist in her studio, working on a painting of a nude female model, part of the painting, and the model herself posing for the painting. The artist is fully clothed, wearing a scarlet knitted cardigan and large hat, with her face viewed in profile, silhouetted by a light area of the painting depicted in the background. Behind her, to her left, is the painting she has been working on. Further back, to the right, is her life model, her friend and fellow artist Ella Naper, who is also facing away from the viewer, standing in a contrapposto stance on a raised platform with a striped carpet, her arms raised and bent to clasp behind her head. The model stands out against an orange backcloth and the wall of the studio.

The work measures 60 by 50.25 inches (152.4 cm × 127.6 cm). It was painted in Knight's studio in Lamorna and first exhibited at the Passmore Edwards Art Gallery in 1913, and then at the 1913 show of the International Society of Sculptors, Painters and Gravers at the Grosvenor Gallery in London, under the title The Model.

Reputedly, it was rejected for the 1913 Royal Academy Summer Exhibition. Critics objected to the impropriety of a female artist depicting herself alongside a female nude. At the time when Knight had attended art school, female students were not permitted to paint live models, being restricted to copying casts and drawings. Writing in The Telegraph, art critic Claude Phillips called the painting "harmless" and "dull", "obviously an exercise" which "might quite appropriately have stayed in the artist's studio", but also said that it was "vulgar" and "repels". An article in The Times in 1914 called it "extremely clever", but another in 1939 criticised its "mistaken attempts at solidity" and called it "regrettable".

Knight retained the work until her death in 1970, shortly before the opening of a major retrospective exhibition. It was sold at Sotheby's later that year for £700, the highest price achieved in the sales by her executors to clear her studio, and it was acquired by the National Portrait Gallery in 1971.

The Financial Times has compared it to the later works of Lucian Freud. In The Face of Britain (2015), the historian Simon Schama described it as a "incomparably, her greatest work, all at once conceptually complex, heroically independent, formally ingenious and lovingly sensual."
