= Take Off (painting) =

1943 painting by Laura Knight

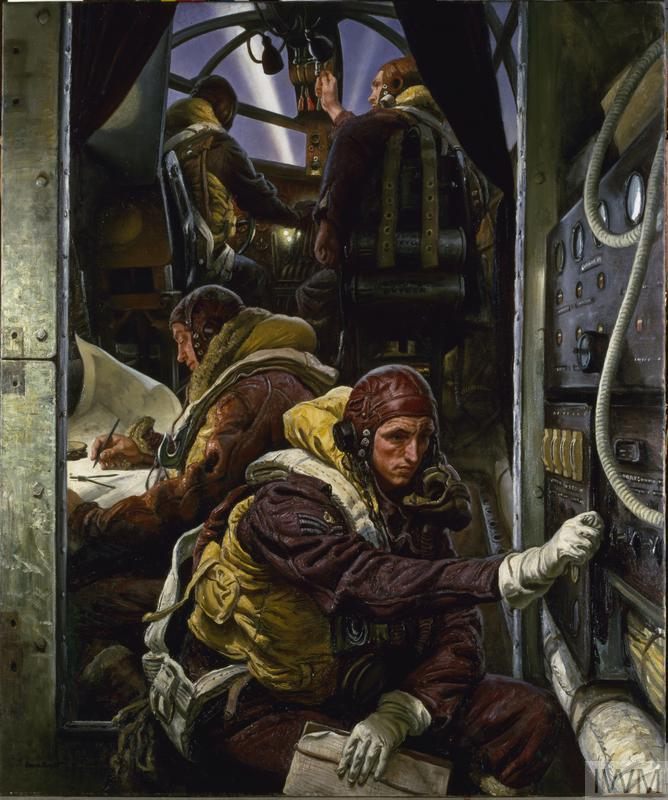
- Artist: Laura Knight
- Year: 1943
- Medium: Oil on canvas
- Dimensions: 182.8 cm × 152.4 cm (72.0 in × 60.0 in)
- Location: Imperial War Museum; London

Take Off is an oil-on-canvas painting by English artist Laura Knight, created in 1943. It is one of the several works that she made when she was one of the British official war artists during the Second World War. It is held at the Imperial War Museum, in London.

== Description ==
The painting depicts the interior of a British Short Stirling bomber of the Royal Air Force. Inside the plane there are four of the seven crew members, who are preparing for take off before another night raid on Nazi Germany during the Second World War. Two pilots sit in the cockpit, while a navigator studies his maps, and in the foreground a flight sergeant turns a knob on the wireless device.

The painter, Laura Knight, developed a long and accurate investigation in order to create this work: she later stated that this painting had been the most difficult task she had done so far in the war. She worked in the RAF Mildenhall and lived in the WAAF Officers' Mess for several months while working on the painting. She was also given an obsolete Stirling for preparation. The completed painting depicts in a faithful and detailed manner the moment of preparation for the take-off of the British crew, which is concentrating in their next mission. The realism of the painting gives it a photographic feeling. The navigator of the scene, Raymond Frankish Escreet, would be killed in action and his mother received a reproduction of this picture as a memento.
