= Laura Knight =

English artist (1877–1970)

Dame Laura Knight DBE RA RWS
- Born: Laura Johnson; 4 August 1877; Long Eaton, Derbyshire, England
- Died: 7 July 1970 (aged 92); London, England
- Education: Nottingham School of Art
- Known for: Painting
- Notable work: The Nuremberg Trial (1946)
- Movement: Realism, Impressionism
- Spouse: Harold Knight (m. 1903; died 1961)
- Awards: Silver Medal at the 1928 Amsterdam Art Olympics
- Website: www.damelauraknight.com

Dame Laura Knight DBE RA RWS (née Johnson; 4 August 1877 – 7 July 1970) was an English artist who worked in oils, watercolours, etching, engraving and drypoint. Knight was a painter in the figurative, realist tradition, who embraced English Impressionism. In her long career, Knight was among the most successful and popular painters in Britain. Her success in the male-dominated British art establishment paved the way for greater status and recognition for female artists.

In 1929, she was created a Dame, and in 1936 became the first woman ever elected to full membership of the Royal Academy. Her large retrospective exhibition at the Royal Academy in 1965 was the first for a woman. Knight was known for painting amidst the world of the theatre and ballet in London, and for being a war artist during the Second World War. She was also greatly interested in, and inspired by, marginalised communities and individuals, including Romani people and circus performers.

== Biography ==
=== Early life ===
Laura Johnson was born in Long Eaton, Derbyshire, the youngest of the three daughters of Charles and Charlotte Johnson. Her father abandoned the family not long after her birth, and Knight grew up amid financial problems. Her grandfather owned a lace-making factory but the advent of new technology led to the business going bankrupt. The family had relations in northern France who were also in the lace-making business and in 1889 Knight was sent to them with the intention that she would eventually study art at a Parisian atelier. After a miserable time in French schools, the bankruptcy of her French relations forced Knight to return to England.

Charlotte Johnson taught part-time at the Nottingham School of Art, and managed to have Knight enrolled as an "artisan student" there, paying no fees, aged just 13. At the age of 15, and still a student herself, Knight took over her mother's teaching duties when Charlotte was diagnosed with cancer and became seriously ill. Later, Laura won a scholarship and the gold medal in the national student competition held by the then South Kensington Museum. She continued to give private lessons after she left the School of Art, as both she and her sister Evangeline Agnes, known as Sissie, had been left to live alone on very little money, after the deaths of their mother, their sister Nellie and both their grandmothers. At the School of Art, Laura met one of the most promising students, Harold Knight, who was then aged 17, and determined that the best method of learning was to copy his technique. Laura and Harold became friends, and married in 1903.

=== Staithes and Laren ===
In 1894, the couple visited Staithes on the Yorkshire coast, for a holiday and soon returned, accompanied by her sister Evangeline Agnes, to live and work there, becoming key members of the Staithes group of artists that was forming there. In Staithes Laura drew the people of the fishing village and the surrounding farms, showing the hardship and poverty of their lives. She made studies, paintings and watercolours, often painting in muted, shadowy tones. Lack of money for expensive materials meant she produced few oil paintings at this time. Local children would sit for her, for pennies, giving her the opportunity to develop her figure painting technique. Less successful at this time were her landscape and thematic works. Although she painted on the moors, high inland from Staithes, she did not consider herself successful at resolving these studies into finished pieces. Later she recalled:

Even though my studio was so often warmed by burning canvases and drawings I do not regret all the experimental work done and destroyed. Staithes was too big a subject for an immature student, but working there I developed a visual memory which has stood me in good stead ever since.

Laura Johnson and Harold Knight married in 1903 and made their first trip to the Netherlands in 1904. They spent six weeks there that year and six months there in 1905. They visited the artists' colony at Laren. The colony was a group of followers of the Hague School of artists who had been painting in remote rural communities since the 1850s. The Knights made a third trip to Laren in 1906 before spending that winter in Yorkshire.

=== Cornwall ===
In late 1907 the Knights moved to Cornwall, staying first in Newlyn, before moving to the nearby village of Lamorna. There, alongside Lamorna Birch and Alfred Munnings, they became central figures in the artists colony known as the Newlyn School. By March 1908 both had work exhibited at the Newlyn Art Gallery and Harold Knight was an established professional portrait painter, while Laura Knight was still developing her art. Around Newlyn the Knights found themselves among a group of sociable and energetic artists, which appears to have allowed the more vivid and dynamic aspects of Laura's personality to come to the fore.

Laura Knight spent the summer of 1908 working on the beaches at Newlyn making studies for her large painting of children in bright sunlight. The Beach was shown at the Royal Academy in 1909, and was considered a great success, showing Laura painting in a more Impressionist style than she had displayed previously. Around this time she began painting compositions of women in the open air, in the plein-air manner, often on the rocks or cliff-tops around Lamorna. Knight would sometimes use models from London who were prepared to pose nude. Although there was some resentment locally about this, the landowner, Colonel Paynter of Boskenna, was fully supportive and allowed Knight and the other artists a free rein. Daughters of the Sun, which showed several women, some naked, sitting by a coastal inlet was completed in 1911 and well received when shown at the Royal Academy. It is now only known from photographs but was considered to be a challenge to the then prevailing attitudes towards female nudity and aroused considerable controversy when included in a touring exhibition. The painting was badly damaged during World War I and was eventually destroyed by mould. In recent years, examples of Knight's plein-air compositions from Cornwall have attracted high prices at auction.

Another work from this time is The Green Feather, which Knight painted outdoors in a single day, and reworked due to a change in the weather, which shows the model Dolly Snell in an emerald evening dress with a hat and a large feather. Knight sent the painting to an international exhibition held at the Carnegie Institute in Pittsburgh and it was purchased by the National Gallery of Canada for £400. Knight started the vast painting Lamorna Birch and his Daughters in 1913, painting in a wood in the Lamorna Valley but then kept the painting unfinished in her studio until finally completing it in 1934, the same year Birch was elected a full member of the Royal Academy.

==== Self Portrait with Nude ====
Self Portrait with Nude, 1913

In 1913 Knight made a painting that was a first for a woman artist, Self Portrait with Nude, showing herself painting a nude model, the artist Ella Naper. The painting is a complex, formal composition in a studio setting. Using mirrors, Knight painted herself and Naper as seen by someone entering the studio behind them both. As an art student Knight had not been permitted to directly paint nude models but, like all female art students in England at the time, was restricted to working from casts and copying existing drawings. Knight deeply resented this, and Self Portrait with Nude is a clear challenge, and reaction, to those rules.

The painting was first shown in 1913 at the Passmore Edwards Art Gallery in Newlyn, and was well received by both the local press and other artists. Although the Royal Academy rejected the painting for exhibition, it was shown at the International Society of Sculptors, Painters and Gravers in London, as The Model. The Daily Telegraph's critic called the painting "vulgar", and suggested that it "might quite appropriately have stayed in the artist's studio".

Despite this reaction, Knight continued to exhibit the painting throughout her career, and it continued to receive press criticism. After Knight's death the picture, now known simply as Self Portrait (1913), was purchased by the National Portrait Gallery, and is now considered both a key work in the story of female self-portraiture and as symbolic of wider female emancipation. In 2015, Simon Schama described the painting as a "masterpiece" and "incomparably, her greatest work, all at once conceptually complex, heroically independent, formally ingenious and lovingly sensual."

=== First World War ===
Knight worked with Ella Naper, who was experienced in enameling techniques, to produce a set of small enamel pieces featuring several ballet dancers, which were shown at the Fine Art Society in London in 1915. Wartime censorship during the First World War included restrictions on sketching and painting around the British coastline, which caused problems for Knight, particularly when painting Spring. Special painting and sketching permits available after 1915 allowed her to continue her paintings of cliff-top landscapes. These were often depicted as relaxed summer scenes but some of her works, particularly those painted after the start of World War I, of a lone woman on a clifftop staring down at a turbulent sea had a darker undertone. Spring was shown at the Royal Academy in 1916 but later reworked. Several others were completed from studies in the Knights' first London studio after they moved to the capital in 1919.

Also in 1916, Knight received a £300 commission to paint a canvas for the Canadian Government War Records office on the theme of Physical Training in a Camp, and produced a series of paintings of boxing matches at Witley in Surrey. During the war, in 1916, Harold Knight had registered as a conscientious objector and was eventually required to work as a farm labourer.

=== Ballet ===
Between 1911 until 1929, Knight drew and painted backstage, some of the most famous ballet dancers of the day from Sergei Diaghilev's Ballets Russes. Her subjects included Lydia Lopokova, Anna Pavlova and the dance teacher Enrico Cecchetti. Knight also painted backstage, and in the dressing rooms, at several Birmingham Repertory Theatre productions. In 1924 she was commissioned to design the costumes for the ballet Les Roses.

=== Etching ===
In the early 1920s, Knight bought Sir George Clausen's printing press and began etching. She produced 90 prints between 1923 and 1925, including a poster advertising tram travel to Twickenham for London Transport. Knight continued to produce posters for London Transport throughout her career, including one on circus clowns in 1932 and Winter Walks in 1957.

In 1922, Knight made her first trip to the United States, where she served on the jury at the Pittsburgh International Exhibition of Pictures.

=== Baltimore 1926 ===
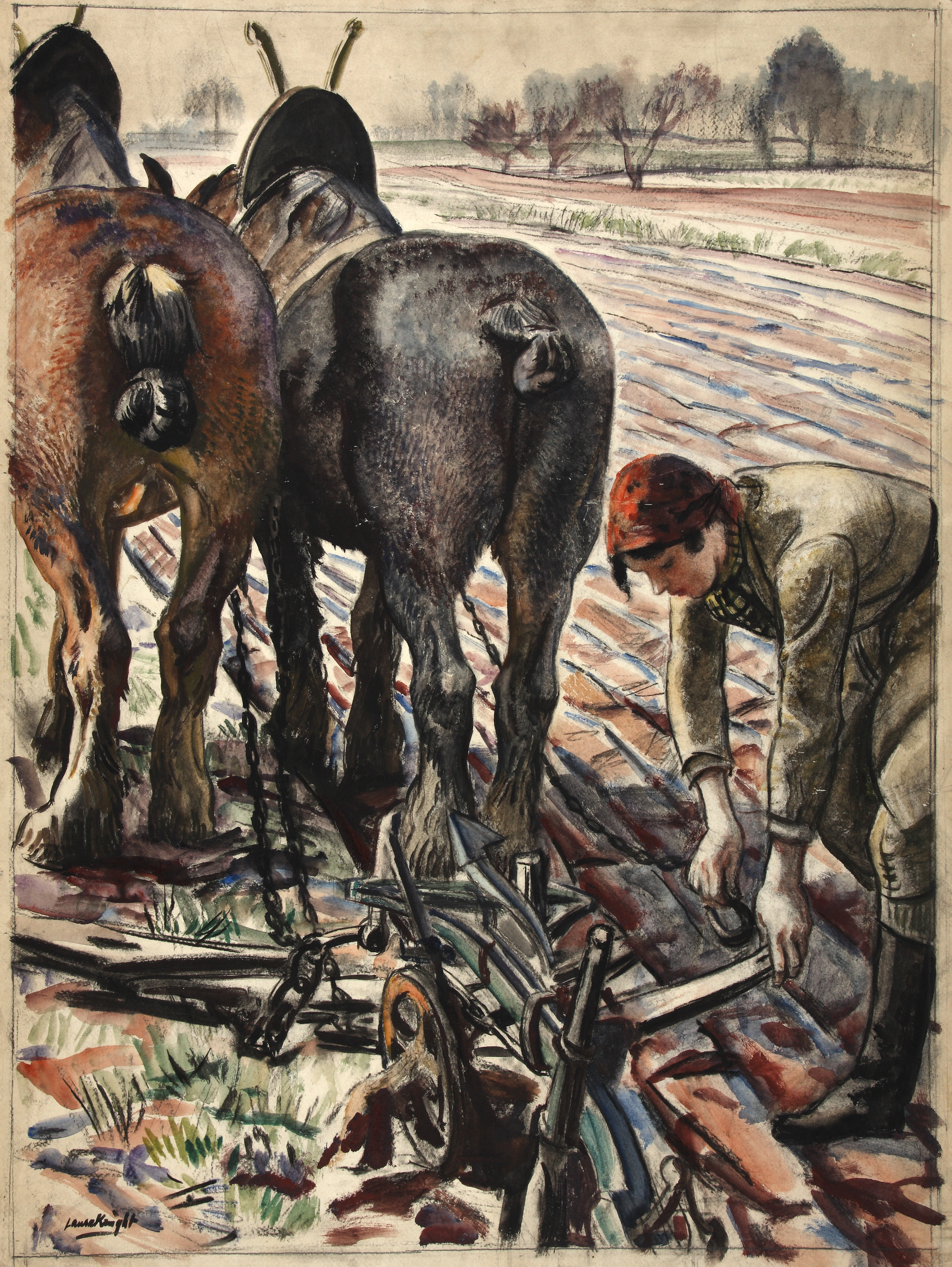
Land Army Girl (1944) (National Archives)

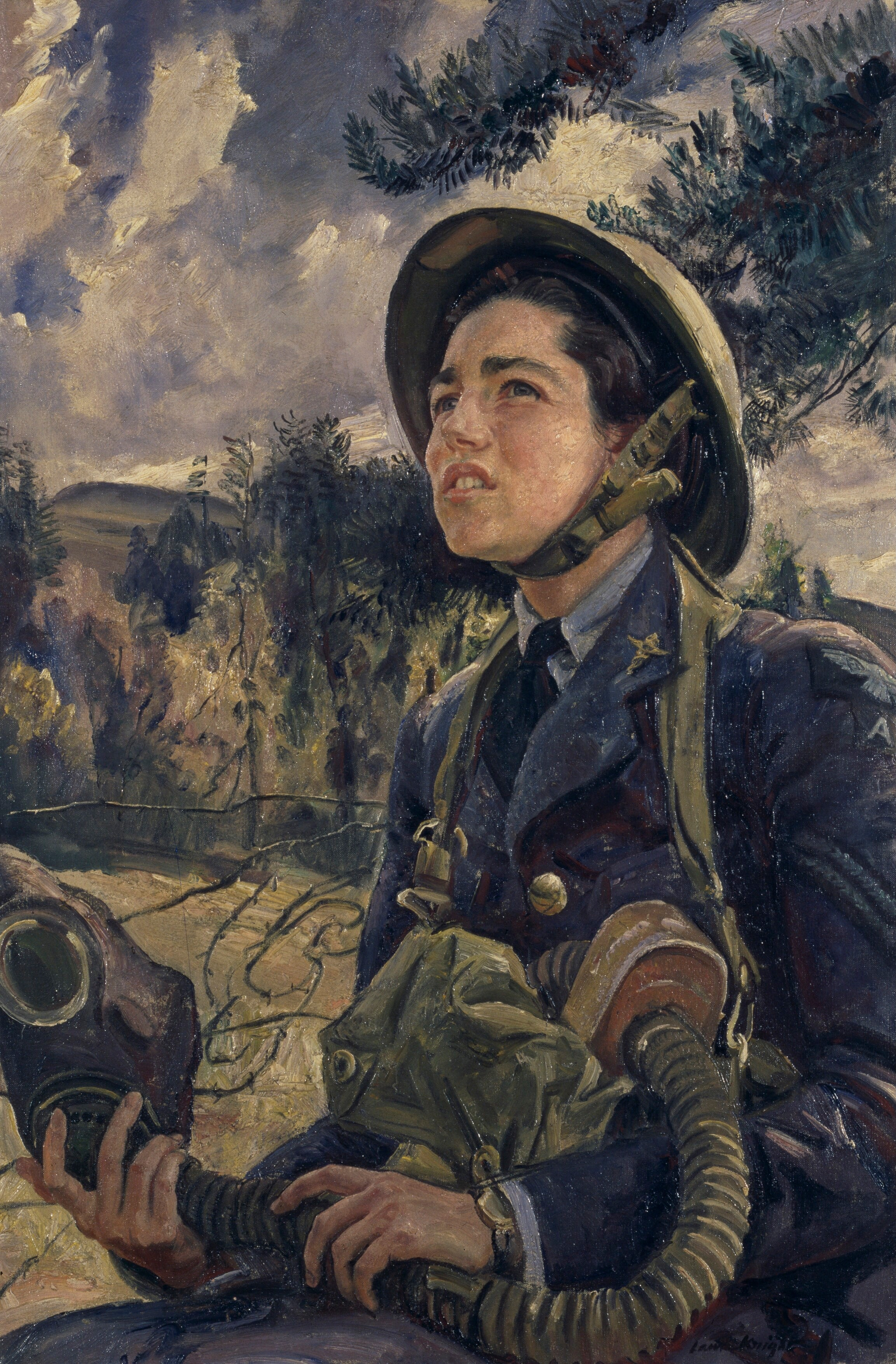
Corporal J. D. M. Pearson, GC, WAAF (1940) (Art. IWM ART LD 626)

In 1926, Harold Knight spent several months at the Johns Hopkins Hospital in Baltimore, in America, painting portrait commissions of surgeons. Laura joined him there and was given permission to paint at the Baltimore Children's Hospital and in the black wards of the racially segregated Johns Hopkins Hospital. Whilst in Baltimore Knight painted a nurse, Pearl Johnson, who took her to meetings and concerts of the early American civil rights movement. Knight also hired a mother and child model to pose for the composition originally known as the Madonna of the Cotton Fields. Knight took these paintings back to London with her and they feature in the Pathé newsreel produced to mark her election as an Associate of the Royal Academy in 1927. Another portrait of Johnson, Irene and Pearl, shows two women against a backdrop of skyscrapers and was one of a number of portraits Knight painted in the late 1920s that appear strikingly modern. Miss Ealand, shown at the Royal Academy in 1928, depicts a woman with cropped hair wearing a jacket and holding a shotgun. The same year Knight's portrait of a woman saxophone player was displayed at the National Gallery of Art in Washington DC.

=== Circus folk ===
In the early 1920s, Knight visited the Bertram Mills Circus at Olympia in West London. Mills' circus was a highly polished show with internationally renowned performers. Knight painted some of these performers, such as the clown Whimsical Wilson, several times. Charivari or The Grand Parade, exhibited at the Royal Academy in 1929, depicts practically the entire circus cast of performers and animals.

Throughout 1929 and 1930, she went on a tour of Britain with the combined Bertram Mills and Great Carmo's Circus. Painting within a working circus forced Knight to paint at great speed, as the performers rarely had much time to pose. Knight responded by painting directly onto the canvas without any preliminary drawing. Whilst this led to some of her circus scenes appearing 'flat', her paintings of small groups of clowns, such as The Three Clowns (1930) and Old Time Clowns (1957), were much more successful. Her Circus Folk exhibition, at the Alpine Club in 1930, was heavily criticised in art journals, but her paintings of more mundane subjects, such as domestic interiors and London streets, were highly praised. Notable works from this period include Susie and the Wash-basin (1927), Blue and Gold (1927), A Cottage Bedroom (1929) and Spring in St. John's Wood (1933).

Two of her circus designs were among the winning entries in a 1933 competition run by Cadbury's for a series of chocolate box designs and which were displayed at the Leicester Galleries in London. In 1934 Knight developed a series of circus designs for the Modern Art for the Table tableware range produced by Clarice Cliff.

=== Recognition ===
At the 1928 Summer Olympics in Amsterdam, Knight won the Silver Medal in Painting with the painting Boxer (1917), one of the series she had painted at Witley in 1916. In 1929 Knight was made a Dame Commander of the Order of the British Empire, and in June 1931 she received an honorary degree from St. Andrews University. Knight was elected president of the Society of Women Artists in 1932 and held the post until 1967. In 1936 she became the first woman since 1769 elected to full membership of the Royal Academy. (Note: Two founding members of the Royal Academy of the Arts in 1768 were Mary Moser and Angelica Kauffman, but women could not attend life classes or hold office. Women were discouraged from studying at the school following Moser and Kauffman's deaths. The Oxford Dictionary of National Biography says that Annie Swynnerton was the first woman since the 1800s to become an associate. The Royal Academy of Arts site says that she is the first woman to be elected into the organization (Moser and Kauffman were co-founders), in 1922. Knight became an associate member in 1927 and became the first woman to be elected a full member in 1936. She was elected a senior member in 1953.) The same year Knight published her first autobiography, Oil Paint and Grease Paint, which became a best-seller, with four hardback editions followed in 1941 by a Penguin paperback printing.

From 1933, the Knights became regular visitors to Malvern, Worcestershire, making an annual visit to the Malvern Festival, which had been established by their friend Barry Jackson. During one such visit Knight met George Bernard Shaw and painted his portrait. A blue plaque at the Mount Pleasant Hotel on Belle Vue Terrace, Great Malvern, commemorates the time the Knights spent in the area. They found much inspiration for their work in the Malvern Hills and in the surrounding countryside and by the start of World War Two the couple were living at Colwall in Herefordshire.

=== Gypsies ===
In the mid-1930s, Knight befriended and painted groups of Gypsies at the Epsom and Ascot racecourses. Knight frequently returned to the racecourses and painted from the back of an antique Rolls-Royce car, which was large enough to accommodate her easel. Often pairs of Gypsy women would pose at the open door of the Rolls-Royce, with the race-day crowds in the background. From Epsom, Knight was invited to the Gypsy settlement at Iver in Buckinghamshire. Knight visited the Iver settlement, normally closed to outsiders, every day for several months in the late 1930s. These visits resulted in a series of portraits of great intensity. Two women, in particular, sat a number of times for Knight: Lilo Smith, the subject of Old Gypsy Women (1938) and Gypsy Splendour (1939), and her daughter-in-law, Beulah. Gypsy Splendour was shown at the Royal Academy in 1939, the year Lilo Smith died.

=== Second World War ===
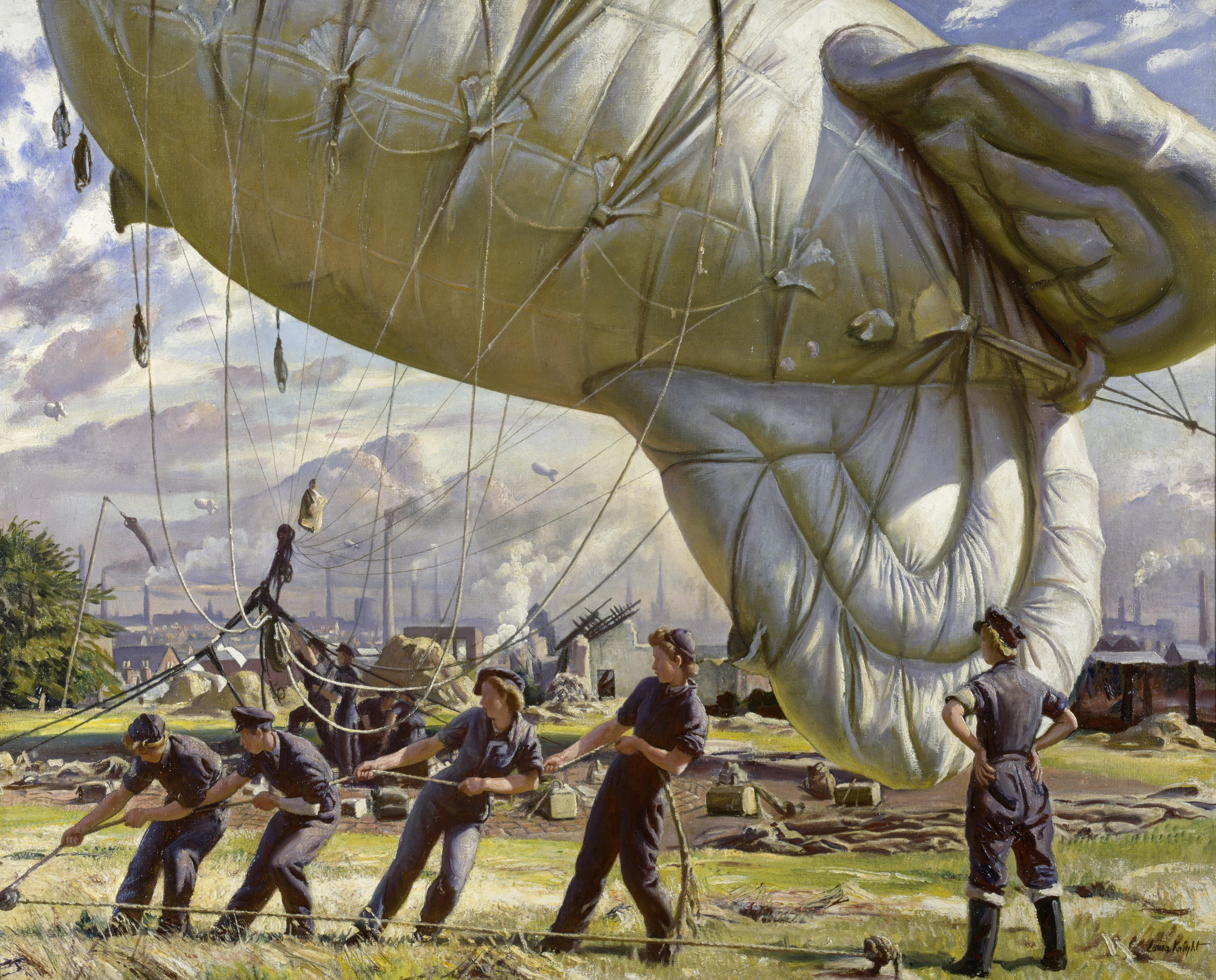
A Balloon Site, Coventry (1943) (Art. IWM ART LD 2750)

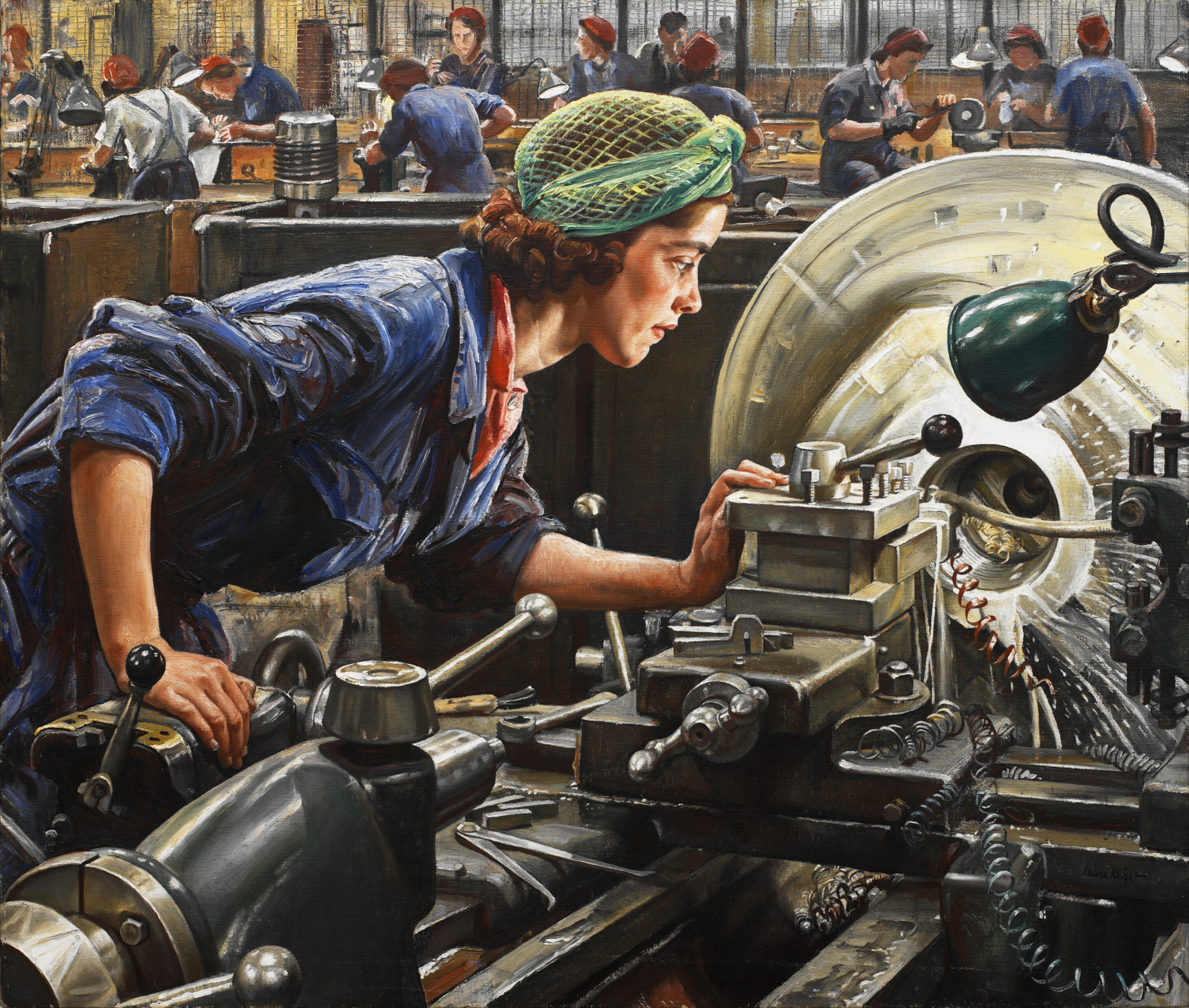
Ruby Loftus Screwing a Breech-ring (1943) (Art. IWM LD 2850)

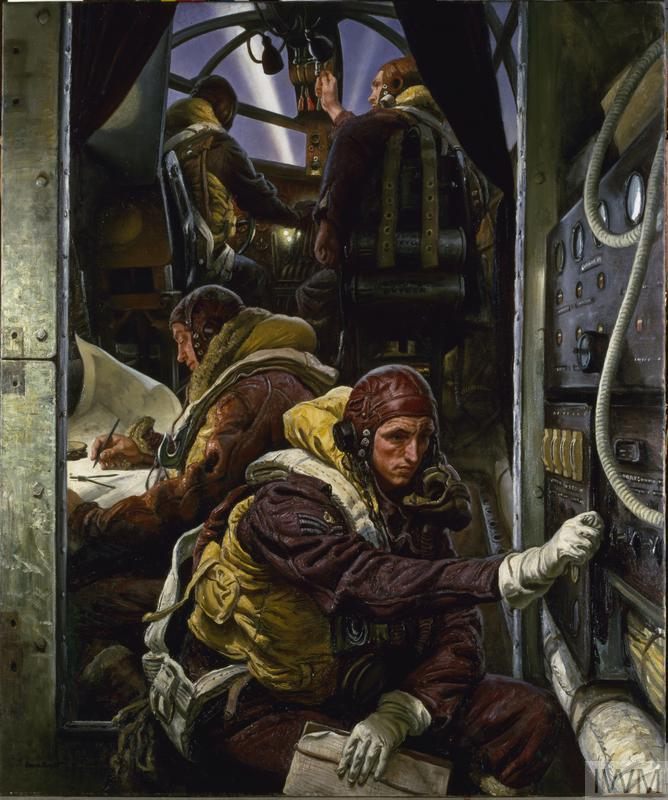
Take Off (1943) (Art.IWM ART LD 3834)

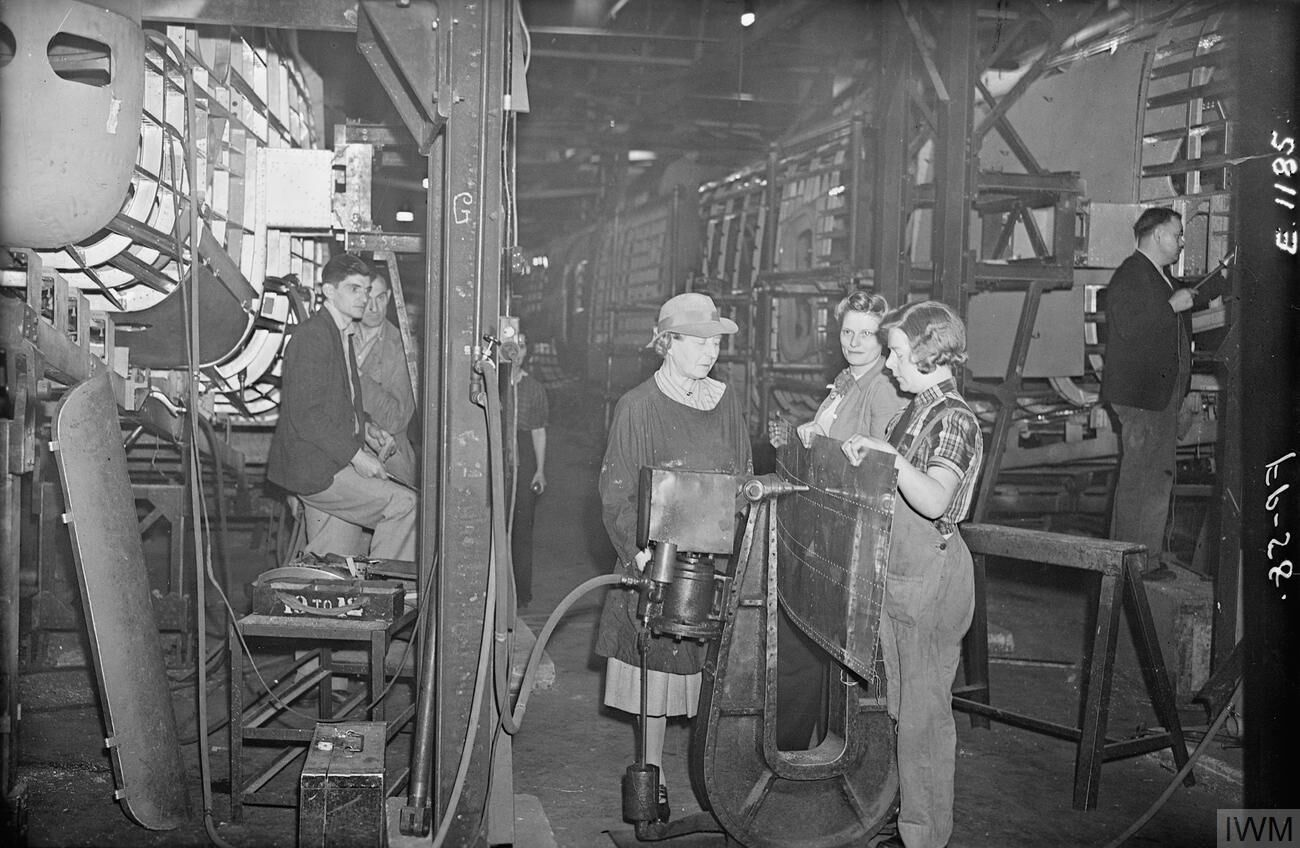
Knight (center, with hat) visiting a bomber factory

In September 1939 Knight was asked to produce a recruitment poster for the Women's Land Army, WLA. Knight hired two Suffolk Punch horses and a plough from a farmer and painted them outdoors in a cherry orchard on Averills' farm in Worcestershire. Her original design for the WLA poster was rejected for placing too much emphasis on the horses rather than the women working. A new design, with a single woman, was accepted. Knight painted her 1940 Royal Academy entry, January 1940, showing a similar scene at the same time. During the Second World War, Knight was an official war artist, contracted by the War Artists' Advisory Committee on several short-term commissions. Among the works Knight produced for these commissions were:

- Corporal J. D. M. Pearson, GC, WAAF (1940) – shows Corporal Daphne Pearson of the Women's Auxiliary Air Force, WAAF, a recipient of the Empire Gallantry Medal, later exchanged for the George Cross. Pearson, at Knight's insistence, sat for the portrait holding a rifle; as WAAF personnel were not allowed to carry arms on duty, Knight had to paint over the rifle, which was replaced by a gas mask in the finished painting, with the hands positioned as if still holding a rifle.
- Corporal J. M. Robins (1940) – Robins was awarded the Military Medal for the courage she showed in assisting the wounded when a shelter was directly hit by a bomb during an attack on RAF Andover. WAAC had requested that Knight paint Robins as part of a group of medal-winning women, but Knight refused.
- In For Repairs (1941) – showing a partly inflated barrage balloon being repaired by several members of the Women's Auxiliary Air Force at Wythall, near Birmingham. The painting was shown at the Royal Academy in 1941.
- Corporal Elspeth Henderson and Sergeant Helen Turner (1941) – Henderson and Turner were both awarded the Military Medal for staying at their post when the building they were in received a direct hit from a bomb during an air raid on RAF Biggin Hill. Although painted in Knight's studio in Malvern, the painting shows the two women on duty at their airfield.
- A Balloon Site, Coventry (1943) – shows a team of women hoisting a barrage balloon into position with the chimneys of industrial Coventry in the background surrounding the spire of Coventry Cathedral. WAAC commissioned the work as a propaganda tool to recruit women for Balloon Command, and Knight's composition succeeds in making the work appear both heroic and glamorous.
- Ruby Loftus Screwing a Breech-ring (1943) – in the autumn of 1942 the WAAC commissioned Knight to paint a portrait to bolster female recruitment to the ordnance factories, as the Ministry of Supply were concerned at the level of disaffection and absenteeism among women working in the factories. The resulting painting is one of the largest oil paintings in the entire WAAC collection, and the largest single figure portrait it acquired throughout the war. The painting was first shown on 30 April 1943 at the Royal Academy and the next day was reproduced in eight British newspapers. The painting, along with Knight and Loftus, also featured in a British Paramount News short film shown in cinemas, and was reproduced in a poster version by WAAC. The success of the painting led to further industrial commissions for Knight throughout the 1940s. In 1945 she painted Switch Works at Ellison Switchgear in Birmingham. This was followed by paintings of operations at the Dow Mac concrete railway-sleeper works and at the Skefko ball bearing factory.
- Take Off (1944) – a large and complex group portrait of four from the seven-man crew of a Short Stirling bomber, deep in concentration, preparing for a flight, which Knight painted over several months at RAF Mildenhall. Knight lived in the WAAF Officers' Mess while on the base, and the RAF gave her the use of an obsolete Stirling to work in while preparing the painting. When Knight learned that the navigator in the picture, Raymond Frankish Escreet, had been killed in action, she arranged that his family received a photograph of the painting.

In total, Knight had seventeen completed paintings, together with numerous studies, accepted by the WAAC, most of which were exhibited in the National Gallery or the Royal Academy during the war. Throughout the war Knight also continued taking private commissions, usually for individual or family portraits. The most notable war-time example of these is the composition, Betty and William Jacklin showing a mother and child, along with their pet rabbit and the Malvern countryside in background, which was exhibited at the Royal Academy in 1942, beside In for Repairs.

=== Nuremberg 1946 ===
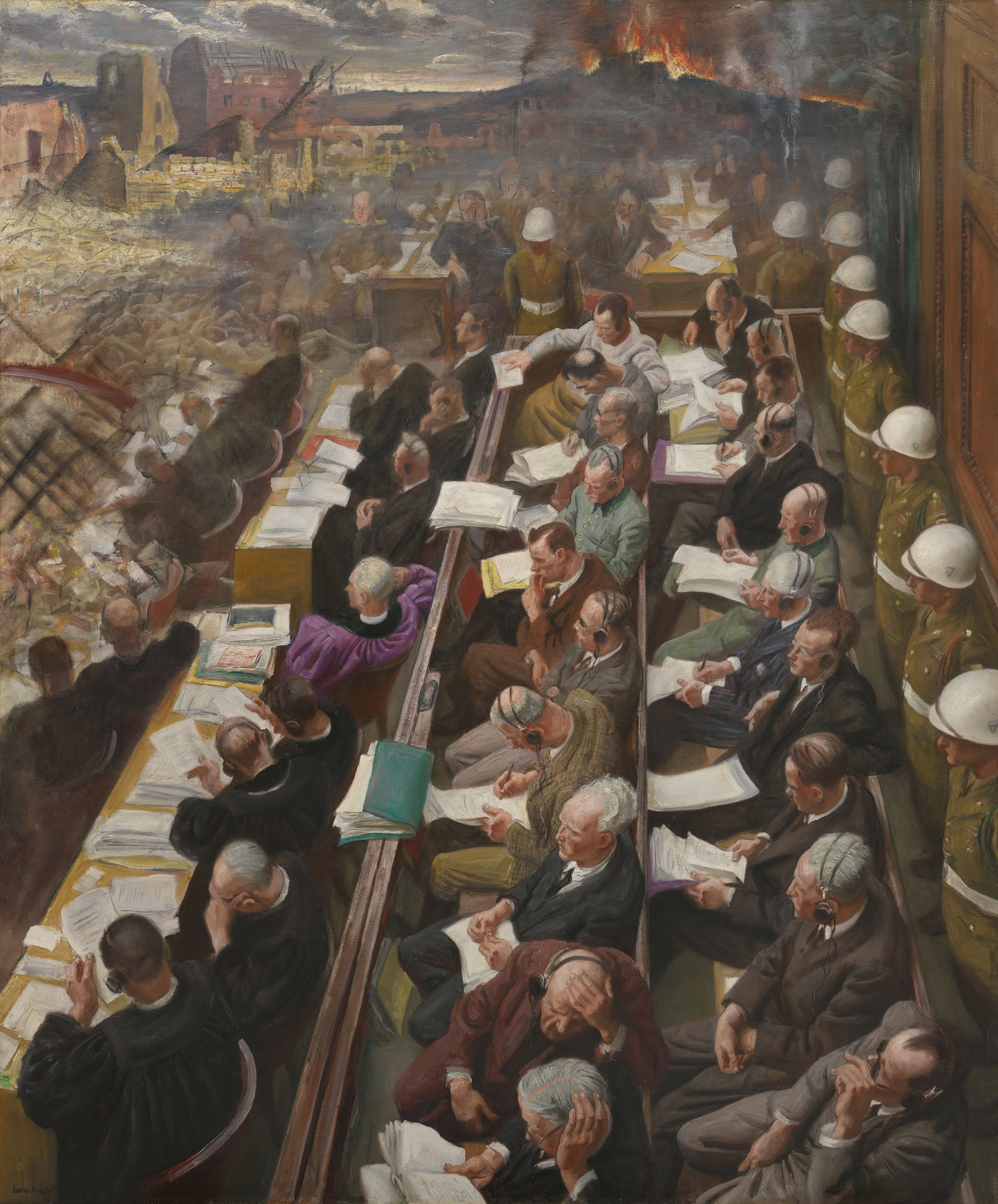
The Nuremberg Trial, 1946 (1946) (Art. IWM ART LD 5798)

In the aftermath of the war, Knight proposed to the War Artists' Advisory Committee the Nuremberg war crimes trials as a subject. The Committee agreed, and Knight went to Germany in January 1946 and spent three months observing the main trial from inside the courtroom. In the courtroom she made detailed, meticulous drawings in chalk and watercolours. These preparatory drawings led to the large oil painting, The Nuremberg Trial. This painting departs from the realism of her wartime paintings, in that, whilst apparently realistically depicting the Nazi war criminals sitting in the dock, the rear and side walls of the courtroom are missing, to reveal a ruined city, partially in flames.

Knight explained this choice of composition in a letter to the War Artists' Advisory Committee:

In that ruined city death and destruction are ever present. They had to come into the picture; without them, it would not be the Nuremberg as it now is during the trial, when the death of millions and utter devastation are the sole topics of conversation wherever one goes – whatever one is doing

The painting was coolly received at the subsequent Royal Academy Summer Exhibition, but was greatly praised by those who had witnessed the trials.

=== Later life ===
After the war, Knight returned to her previous themes of the ballet, the circus and Gypsies, and continued to divide her time between London and Malvern. In 1948, Knight painted backstage at the Shakespeare Memorial Theatre, mostly observing the work of the wardrobe department, still working under austerity restrictions. That same year, she painted a large group portrait of Princess Elizabeth and several civic dignitaries opening the new Broadgate Centre in Coventry. A period of illness affected her work on this commission, and, despite Knight's repainting large parts of the canvas, the finished painting was not well received. A major exhibition of more than eighty works by Knight was held at the Ian Nicol Gallery in Glasgow, in 1952. The following year Knight returned to the theatre, painting and producing crayon studies, backstage at the Old Vic in London during the Birmingham Repertory Theatre's production of Henry IV, Part 1 & Part 2. Throughout this period Knight continued to exhibit at the Royal Academy each year, most notably with a portrait of Jean Rhodes, a professional strong woman known as "The Mighty Mannequin", which when shown in 1955 led to further portrait commissions for Knight. In 1956, Knight worked backstage at the Royal Opera House during performances and rehearsals by the Bolshoi Ballet.

In 1961, Harold Knight died at Colwall; the couple had been married for fifty-eight years. Knight's second autobiography, The Magic of a Line was published in 1965, to coincide with a major retrospective of her work at the Royal Academy. The exhibition, the first such for a woman at the Academy, contained over 250 works, and was followed in 1968 and 1969 by further retrospective exhibitions at the Upper Grosvenor Galleries.

Knight died on 7 July 1970, aged 92, three days before a large exhibition of her work opened at the Nottingham Castle Art Gallery and Museum.

== Published works ==
- 1921: Twenty-one Drawings of the Russian Ballet
- 1923: Laura Knight: A Book of Drawings, with an introduction by Charles Marriott
- 1936: Oil Paint and Grease Paint
- 1962: A Proper Circus Omie
- 1965: The Magic of a Line

== Membership ==
Knight was a member of or affiliated with the following organisations:

- 1907: Member of the Newlyn Society of Artists,
- 1909: Elected associate of the Royal Watercolour Society,
- 1913: Elected member of Royal West of England Academy,
- 1925: Elected member of Royal Society of Painter-Etchers and Engravers,
- 1927: Elected associate of the Royal Academy,
- 1928: Elected full member of the Royal Watercolour Society,
- 1932: Elected full member of Royal Society of Painter-Etchers and Engravers,
- 1932: President of Society of Women Artists,
- 1932: Elected Fellow of Royal Society of Painter-Etchers and Engravers,
- 1936: Elected full member of the Royal Academy,
- 1960: Elected Member of the Royal Society of Portrait Painters.

== Exhibitions ==
Exhibitions of her work held during Knight's life included:

- 1901: Exhibits at the Royal Institute of Oil Painters,
- 1903: Royal Academy Summer Exhibition, also in 1906 and then regularly from 1909,
- 1906: Dutch Life and Landscape, Ernst Brown & Phillip's Leicester Galleries,
- 1907: Life and Landscape, Ernst Brown & Phillip's Leicester Galleries,
- 1910: Venice Biennale, and again in 1914 and 1924,
- 1912: Leicester Galleries, also 1926, 1928, 1932, 1934 and 1939,
- 1912: Carnegie International, Pittsburg, and in 1914 and 1922,
- 1915: Fine Art Society, with Ella Naper and Lamorna Birch,
- 1918: Camp Life and Other Paintings, Leicester Galleries,
- 1920: Pictures of the Russian Ballet, Leicester Galleries,
- 1920: Pictures of Modern Artists, Manchester City Art Gallery,
- 1922: Alpine Club Galleries,
- 1930: Circus Folk, Alpine Club Galleries,
- 1931: Usher Gallery, Lincoln,
- 1931: Art Gallery of Ontario, Toronto,
- 1933: Laing Art Gallery, Newcastle upon Tyne,
- 1934: Nottingham Castle Museum,
- 1963: Upper Grosvenor Galleries, and also in 1968 and 1969,
- 1965: Diploma Galleries, Royal Academy,

=== Posthumous exhibitions ===
- 1970: Nottingham Castle Museum,
- 1983: Edition Graphique Gallery, London,
- 1985: Painting in Newlyn 1900–1930, Newlyn Art Gallery then at the Barbican Art Gallery,
- 1988: David Messum Fine Art,
- 1989: Nottingham Castle Museum,
- 1991: David Messum Fine Art,
- 1996: Women Artists in Cornwall 1880–1940, Falmouth Art Gallery,
- 2005: Painting at the Edge, Penlee House Gallery,
- 2006: From Victorian to Modern..., Djanogly Art Gallery and on tour,
- 2008: Laura Knight at the Theatre, The Lowry and on tour,
- 2008: The Magic of a Line: Drawings by Dame Laura Knight, R.A., Library Print Room, Royal Academy of Arts, then at Penlee House Gallery in 2008,
- 2012: Laura Knight: In the Open Air, Penlee House Gallery and on tour,
- 2013: Laura Knight Portraits, National Portrait Gallery, London, then Laing Art Gallery, Newcastle and Plymouth City Museum and Art Gallery in 2014
- 2021: Laura Knight: A Panoramic View, Milton Keynes Gallery, 160 works displayed, 9 October 2021 – 20 February 2022
- 2024: Dame Laura Knight: I Paint Today, Worcester City Art Gallery and Museum, 13 January 2024 - 30 June 2024
