= Take It Off =

Take It Off may refer to:

- Take It Off (album), an album by Chic
  - "Take It Off", a song by Chic from Take It Off
- "Take It Off" (Fisher song), a song by Fisher
- "Take It Off" (Kesha song), a song by Ke$ha
- "Take It Off" (Joe Nichols song), a song by Joe Nichols
- "Take It Off" (Lil Jon song), a song by Lil Jon
- "Take It Off", a song by 8Ball & MJG from Ridin High
- "Take It Off", a song by Andrew W.K. from I Get Wet
- "Take It Off", a song by AZ from Aziatic
- "Take It Off", a song by The Black Eyed Peas from The Beginning
- "Take It Off", a song by Busta Rhymes from E.L.E. (Extinction Level Event): The Final World Front
- "Take It Off", a song by De La Soul from 3 Feet High and Rising
- "Take It Off", a song by Dick Dale and His Del-Tones from Surfers' Choice
- "Take It Off", a song by Downsyde from When the Dust Settles
- "Take It Off", a song by The Donnas from Spend the Night
- "Take It Off", a song by Inna from Party Never Ends
- "Take It Off", a song by King Kobra from King Kobra III
- "Take It Off", a song by Kiss from Revenge
- "Take It Off", a song by LL Cool J from G.O.A.T.
- "Take It Off", a song by MC Lyte from Act Like You Know
- "Take It Off", a song by Omarion from O
- "Take It Off", a song by Tech N9ne from Sickology 101
- "Take It Off", a song by UGK from Dirty Money
- "Take It Off (Dim the Lights)", a song by Pharrell Williams from In My Mind
- "Take It Off Part 2", a song by Busta Rhymes from It Ain't Safe No More
