= The Nuremberg Trial =

1946 painting by Laura Knight

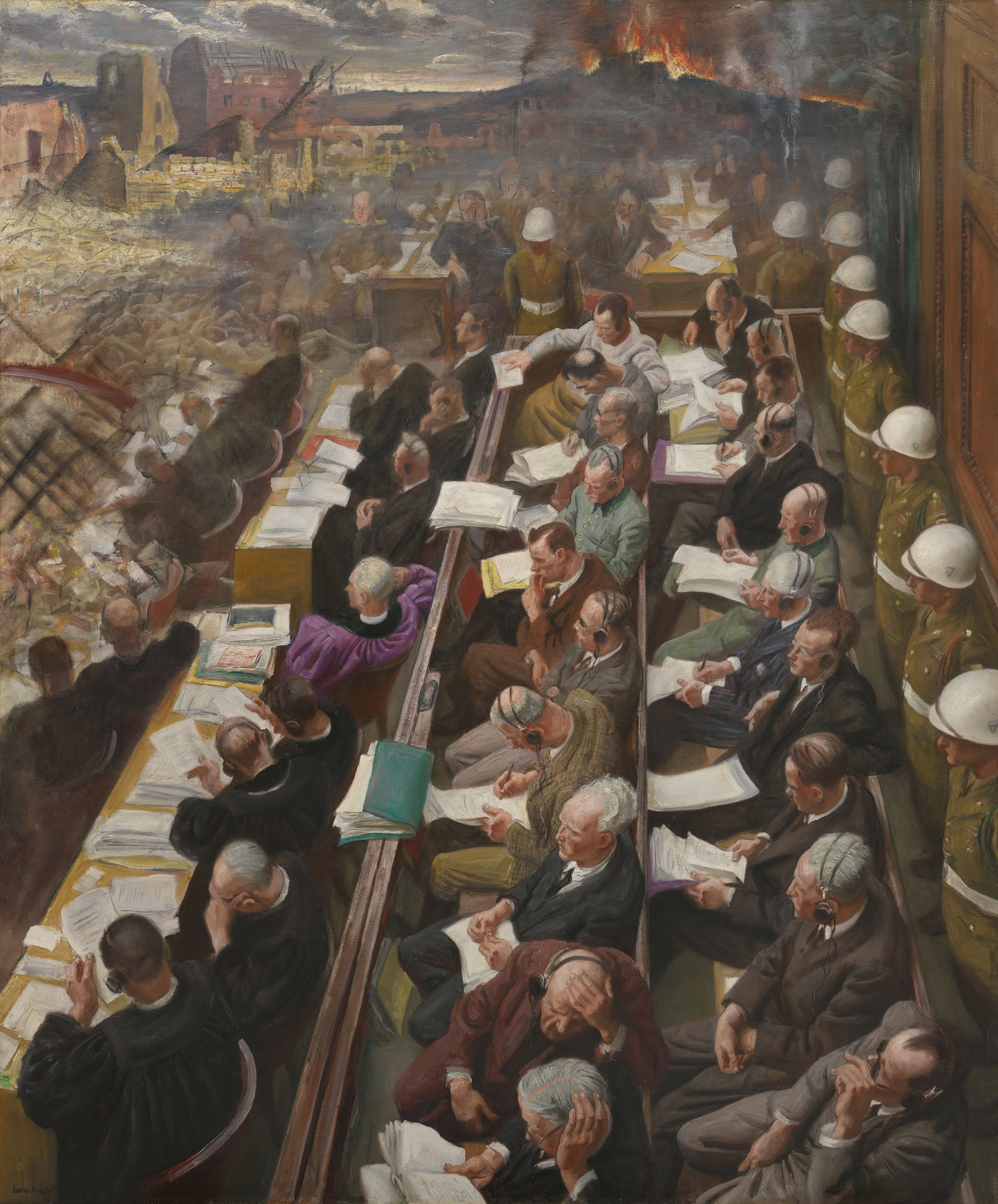
- Artist: Laura Knight
- Year: 1946
- Type: Oil on canvas, war art
- Dimensions: 182.8 cm × 152.4 cm (72.0 in × 60.0 in)
- Location: Imperial War Museum; London

The Nuremberg Trial is an oil painting on canvas by the British artist Laura Knight, from 1946. Knight attended the Nuremberg trials of Nazi German war criminals that took place in 1945–1946. She chose to juxtapose it with the bombed-out ruins of a German city. The painting was displayed at the Royal Academy's Summer Exhibition of 1946 at Burlington House, the first to be held since the end of the war. It was one of the most discussed artworks of the exhibition. Today it is in the collection of the Imperial War Museum, in London.

== Bibliography ==
- Blanchard, Fay & Spira, Anthony (ed.) Laura Knight: A Panoramic View. Bloomsbury USA, 2021.
