= Oriana Baddeley =

Art historian

Oriana Baddeley is a professor of transnational art history at UAL where from 2011 to 2020 she was Dean of Research.

She was born Lucy Oriana Halkett Baddeley in Singapore in 1954, the daughter of British diplomat John Halkett Baddeley (1920-1972) and Greek born Maria Roussen (1916-2005). She was educated at Holland Park Comprehensive, London and studied history and theory of art at the University of Essex where she completed her PhD in 1986 under the supervision of Dawn Adès.

== Education and career ==
Baddeley has written extensively on contemporary Latin American art, frequently in relation to gender, and on Frida Kahlo and Teresa Margolles in particular. Her work has explored the values and meanings of the ancient cultures of the Americas and the ways in which colonization and the discourses of post-colonialism impacted on the interpretation of those cultures. The book Drawing the Line: Art and Cultural Identity in Contemporary Latin America remains a standard text and she collaborated with Gerardo Mosquera to produce the English language version of Beyond the Fantastic: Art Criticism from Contemporary Latin America. With Toshio Watanabe and Partha Mitter, (2001–2004), she worked on a major AHRC funded project, Nation, Identity and Modernity: Visual Culture of India, Japan and Mexico, 1860s–1940. Since 2011 she has developed a number of projects in relation to the Swiss photographer Frédéric Boissonnas.

She was co-founder of the UAL research centre for Transnational Art, Identity and Nation; is a Trustee of the St Catherine Foundation in London and New York; the Ashley Family Foundation; on the Advisory board of the Hyundai Tate Transnational Research Centre; and she is Chair of the Practice Research Advisory Group-UK.

She lives in London and is married with two sons.
