= The Doll House (restaurant) =

Former restaurant in Palm Springs, California

Coordinates: 33.8365°N 116.5464°W

The Doll House was a restaurant in Palm Springs, California which was run by Ethel and George Strebe from 1946. It was first mentioned by a local newspaper as an entrant in a local parade in 1935. It was patronised by celebrities who were entertained by other stars such as Peggy Lee. It closed in 1966, being replaced by an Italian restaurant, Sorrentino's.

One of the staff employed there was Naomi Parker Fraley, the woman who inspired the World War II-era We Can Do It! poster.
