= Rosie the Riveter =

Cultural icon of the US during World War II

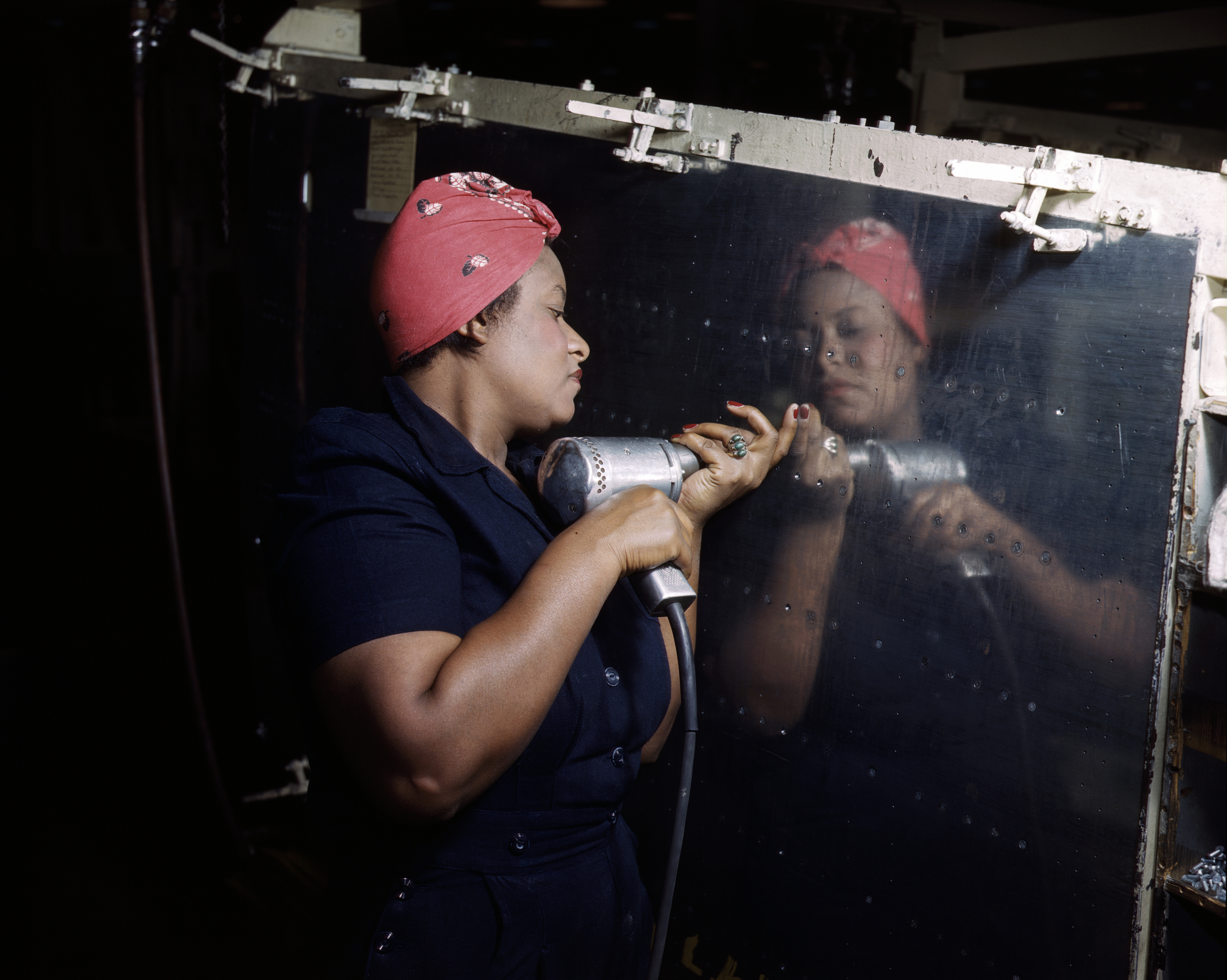
A "Rosie" putting rivets on an Vultee A-31 Vengeance in Nashville, Tennessee, in 1943

Rosie the Riveter is an allegorical cultural icon in the United States who represents the women who worked in the factories and shipyards during World War II, many of whom produced munitions and war supplies. These women sometimes took entirely new jobs replacing the male workers who joined the military. She is widely recognized in the women's empowerment movement.

Similar images of women war workers (such as Ruby Loftus Screwing a Breech-ring) appeared in other countries such as Britain and Australia. The idea of Rosie the Riveter originated in a song written in 1942 by Redd Evans and John Jacob Loeb.

Images of women workers were widespread in the media in formats such as government posters, and commercial advertising was heavily used by the government to encourage women to volunteer for wartime service in factories. Rosie the Riveter became the subject of a Hollywood film in 1944.

== History ==
=== Women in the wartime workforce ===
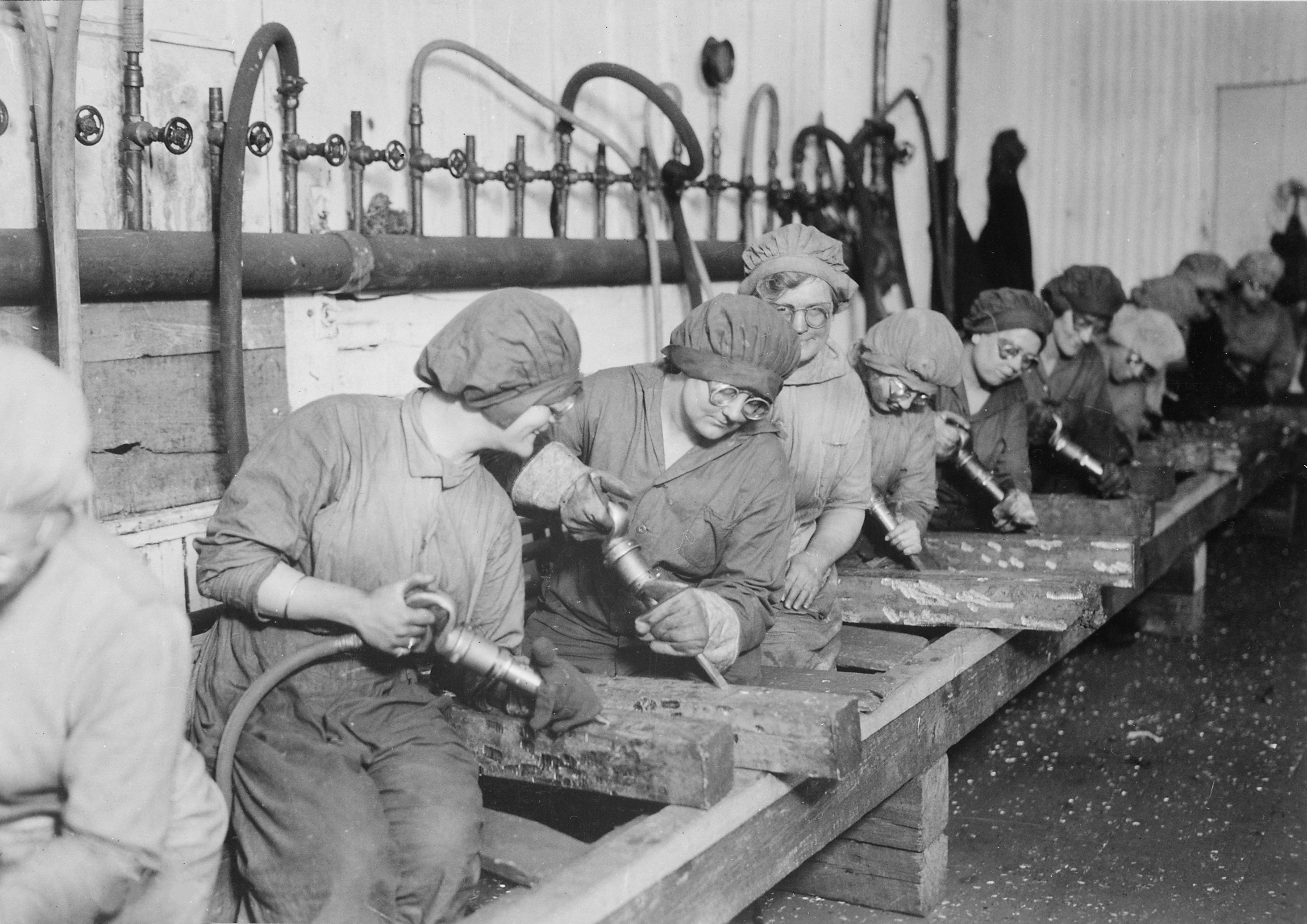
Women workers in the ordnance shops of Midvale Steel and Ordnance Company in Nicetown, Pennsylvania, during World War I, 1918

Because the world wars were total wars, which required governments to utilize their entire populations to defeat their enemies, millions of women were encouraged to work in the industry and take over jobs previously done by men. During World War I women across the United States were employed in jobs previously done by men. World War II was similar to World War I in that massive conscription of men led to a shortage of available workers and therefore a demand for labor which could be filled only by employing women.

Nearly 19 million women held jobs during World War II. Many of these women were already working in lower-paying jobs or were returning to the work-force after being laid off during the depression. Only three million new female workers entered the workforce during the time of the war.

Women responded to the call of need the country was displaying by stepping up to fill positions that were traditionally filled by men. They began to work heavy construction machinery, taking roles in lumber and steel mills as well as physical labor including unloading freight, building airships, making munitions, and much more. Forty women were hired by Pan American Airways to replace men in the repair and maintenance department in the hangars at LaGuardia airfield for service, repair and overhaul on the fleet of aircraft including the Boeing 314 Flying Boat flying to and from Europe. One of the men who trained them recalls:

The women were coming into the work force. I was given the responsibility to train them. I showed them the rivet gun, how it worked. How the holes were drilled. What a buck bar was and how to work as a team. I gave them the basics. And then monitored their progress. The Rosies placed the rivets into the “nacelles” (the big aluminum ring) that covers the engines of the B-17 bombers.

Many women discovered they enjoyed the autonomy these jobs provided them with. It expanded their own expectations for womanly duty and capabilities. However, this was seen as unnatural and as men began to return home from the war, the government instituted another propaganda campaign urging women to "return to normalcy".

A 1943 Monsanto advertisement implying that after the war, women will return to their homes as "Rosie the Housewife."

Although most women took on male-dominated trades during World War II, they were expected to return to their everyday housework once men returned from the war. Government campaigns targeting women were addressed solely at housewives, likely because already-employed women would move to the higher-paid "essential" jobs on their own, or perhaps because it was assumed that most would be housewives. One government advertisement asked women: "Can you use an electric mixer? If so, you can learn to operate a drill." Propaganda was also directed at their husbands, many of whom were unwilling to support such jobs.

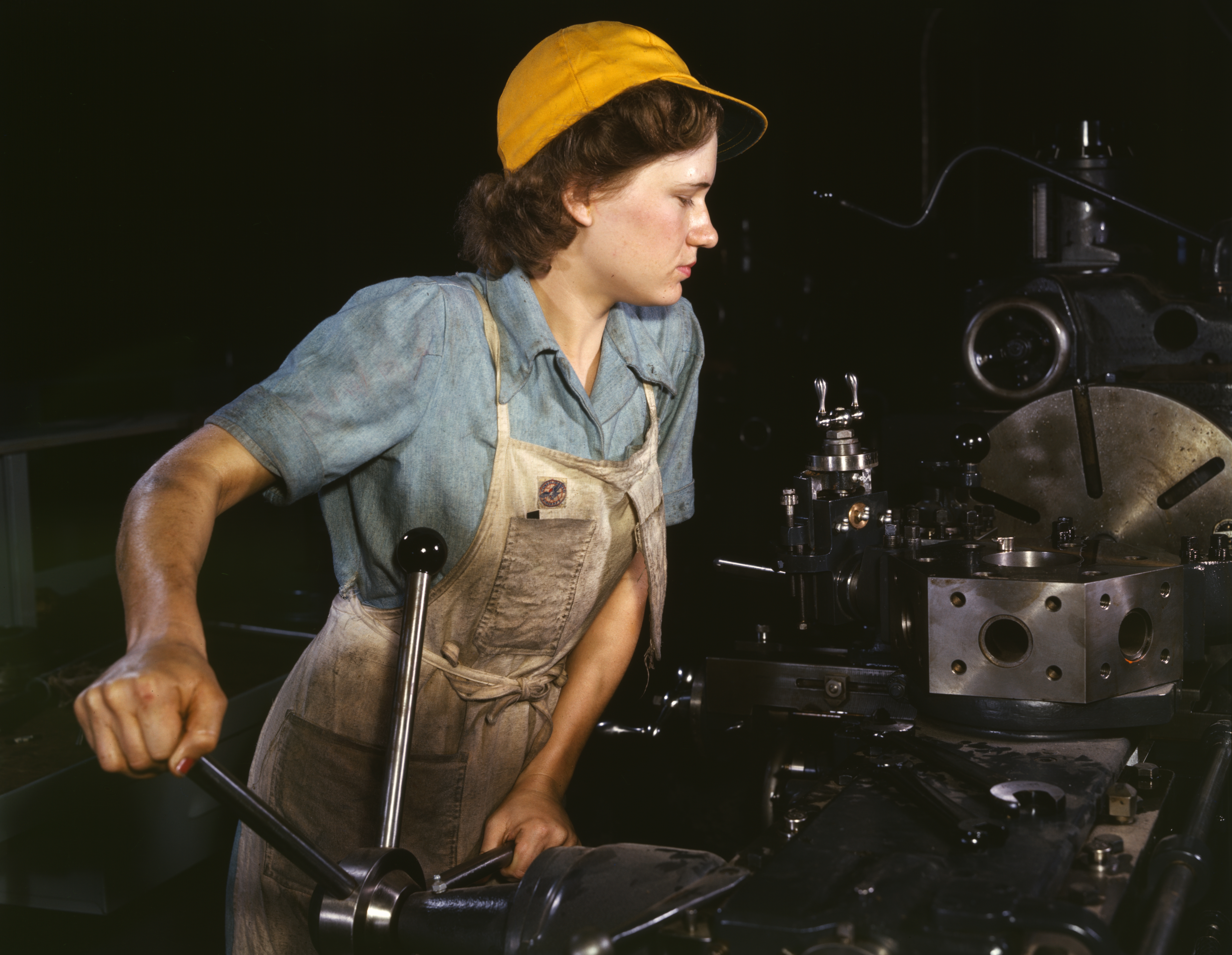
A woman operating a turret lathe, 1942

Many of the women who took jobs during World War II were mothers. Those women with children at home pooled together in their efforts to raise their families. They assembled into groups and shared such chores as cooking, cleaning and washing clothes. Many who did have young children shared apartments and houses so they could save time, money, utilities and food. If they both worked, they worked different shifts so they could take turns babysitting. Taking on a job during World War II made people unsure if they should urge the women to keep acting as full-time mothers, or support them getting jobs to support the country in this time of need.

The Lanham Act of 1940 was passed during this time. It was the first and only successful and nearly universal federal child care system passed in the United States, and it was put in place to support women in the workforce. This program ended six months after the end of the war.

Over six million women got war jobs; black, Hispanic, white, and Asian women worked side by side. In the book A Mouthful of Rivets, Vi Kirstine Vrooman writes about the time when she decided to take action and become a riveter. She got a job building B-17s on an assembly line, and shares just how exciting it was, saying, "The biggest thrill—I can't tell you—was when the B-17s rolled off the assembly line. You can't believe the feeling we had. We did it!" Once women accepted the challenge of the workforce they continued to make strong advances towards equal rights.

In 1944, when victory seemed assured for the Allied Forces, government-sponsored propaganda changed by urging women back to working in the home. Later, many women returned to traditional work such as clerical or administration positions, despite their reluctance to re-enter the lower-paying fields. However, some of these women continued working in the factories. The overall percentage of women working fell from 36% to 28% in 1947.

The identity of the "real" Rosie the riveter is debated. Candidates include:

- Rosina "Rosie" Bonavita who worked for Convair in San Diego, California.
- Rosalind P. Walter, who "came from old money and worked on the night shift building the F4U Corsair fighter." Later in life Walter was a philanthropist, a board member of the WNET public television station in New York and an early and long-time supporter of the Charlie Rose interview show.
- Adeline Rose O'Malley, a riveter at Boeing's Wichita plant.
- Rose Will Monroe, a riveter at the Willow Run Aircraft Factory in Ypsilanti, Michigan, building B-24 bombers for the U.S. Army Air Forces. Born in Pulaski County, Kentucky, in 1920, she moved to Michigan during World War II. The song "Rosie the Riveter" was already popular when Monroe was selected to portray her in a promotional film about the war effort at home. "Rosie" went on to become perhaps the most widely recognized icon of that era. The films and posters she appeared in were used to encourage women to go to work in support of the war effort. At the age of 50, Monroe realized her dream of flying when she obtained a pilot's license. In 1978, she crashed in her small propeller plane when the engine failed during takeoff. The accident resulted in the loss of one kidney and the sight in her left eye, and ended her flying career. She died from kidney failure on May 31, 1997, in Clarksville, Indiana, at the age of 77.

In Canada in 1941, Veronica Foster became "Ronnie, the Bren Gun Girl", Canada's poster girl representing women in the war effort.

A 1944 drama film, Rosie the Riveter, borrowed from the Rosie theme and starred Jane Frazee as Rosalind "Rosie" Warren.

== The song ==
"Rosie the Riveter"
- Cover of the published music to the 1942 song

Song
- Published: 1942 by Paramount Music
- Songwriters: Redd Evans, John Jacob Loeb

The term "Rosie the Riveter" was first used in 1942 in a song of the same name written by Redd Evans and John Jacob Loeb. The song was recorded by numerous artists, including the popular big band leader Kay Kyser, and it became a national hit. It was also recorded by the R&B group, The Four Vagabonds. The song portrays "Rosie" as a tireless assembly line worker, who earned a "Production E" doing her part to help the American war effort.

== Impact ==
=== During the Second World War ===
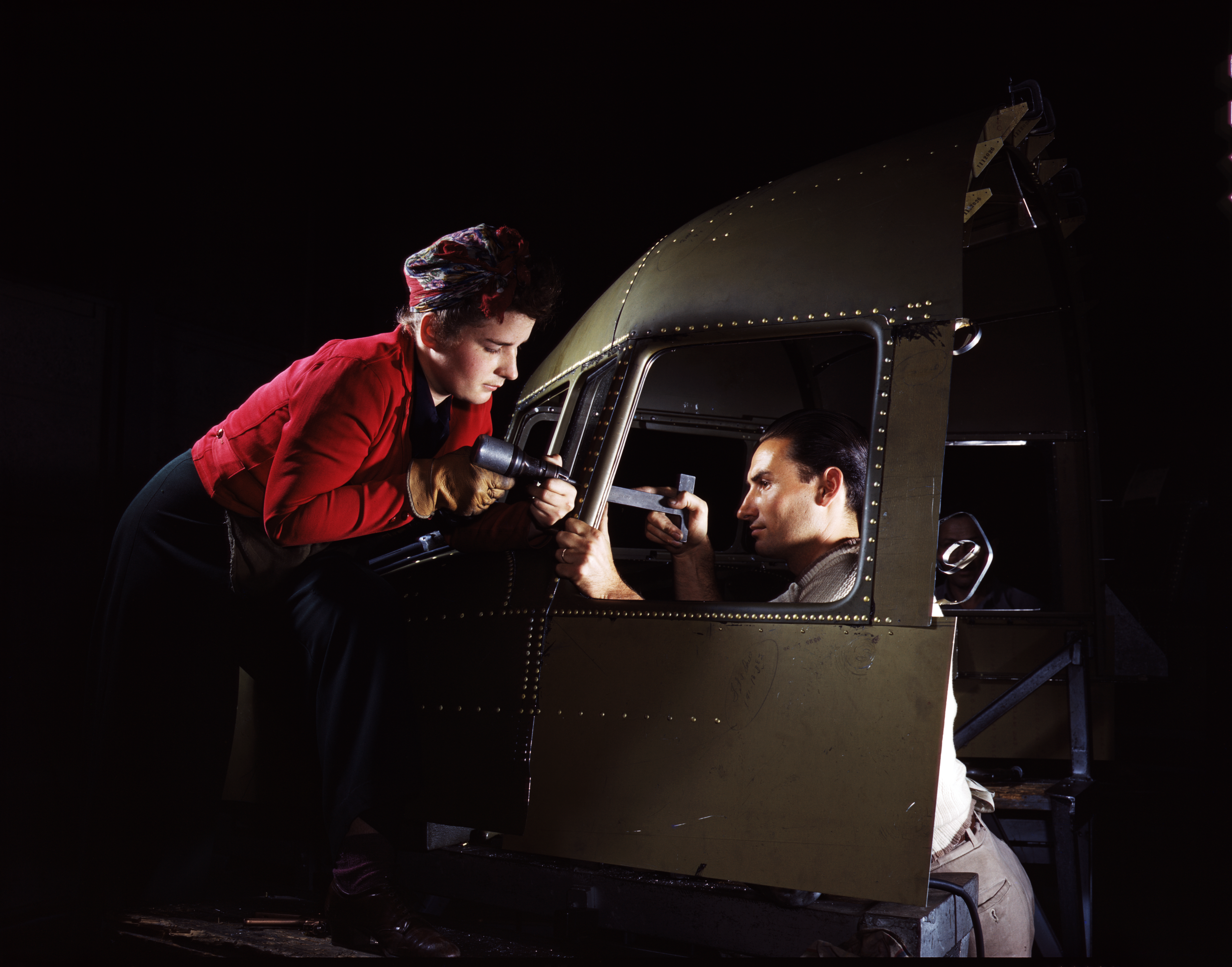
A man and woman riveting team in 1942 working on the cockpit shell of a C-47 aircraft at the plant of North American Aviation

According to the Encyclopedia of American Economic History, "Rosie the Riveter" inspired a social movement that increased the number of working American women from 12 million to 20 million by 1944, a 57% increase from 1940. By 1944 1.7 million unmarried men between the ages of 20 and 34 worked in the defense industry, while 4.1 million unmarried women between those ages did so.

In the first six months after Pearl Harbor employers realized they would need many more workers to fill war contracts, but that most men under age 40 would enter the military. Only women were left. Surveys of employers showed that the proportion of jobs "acceptable" for women jumped from 29% to 85%. African American women were the most affected by the urgent need for more workers. During the war the process of whites working alongside blacks stimulated a partial breaking down of social barriers regarding gender and race.

Although the image of ‘Rosie the Riveter’ reflected the industrial work of welders and riveters, women worked in many sectors of the economy. Their participation in these roles challenged contemporary ideas about ‘men’s work.

=== Postwar ===
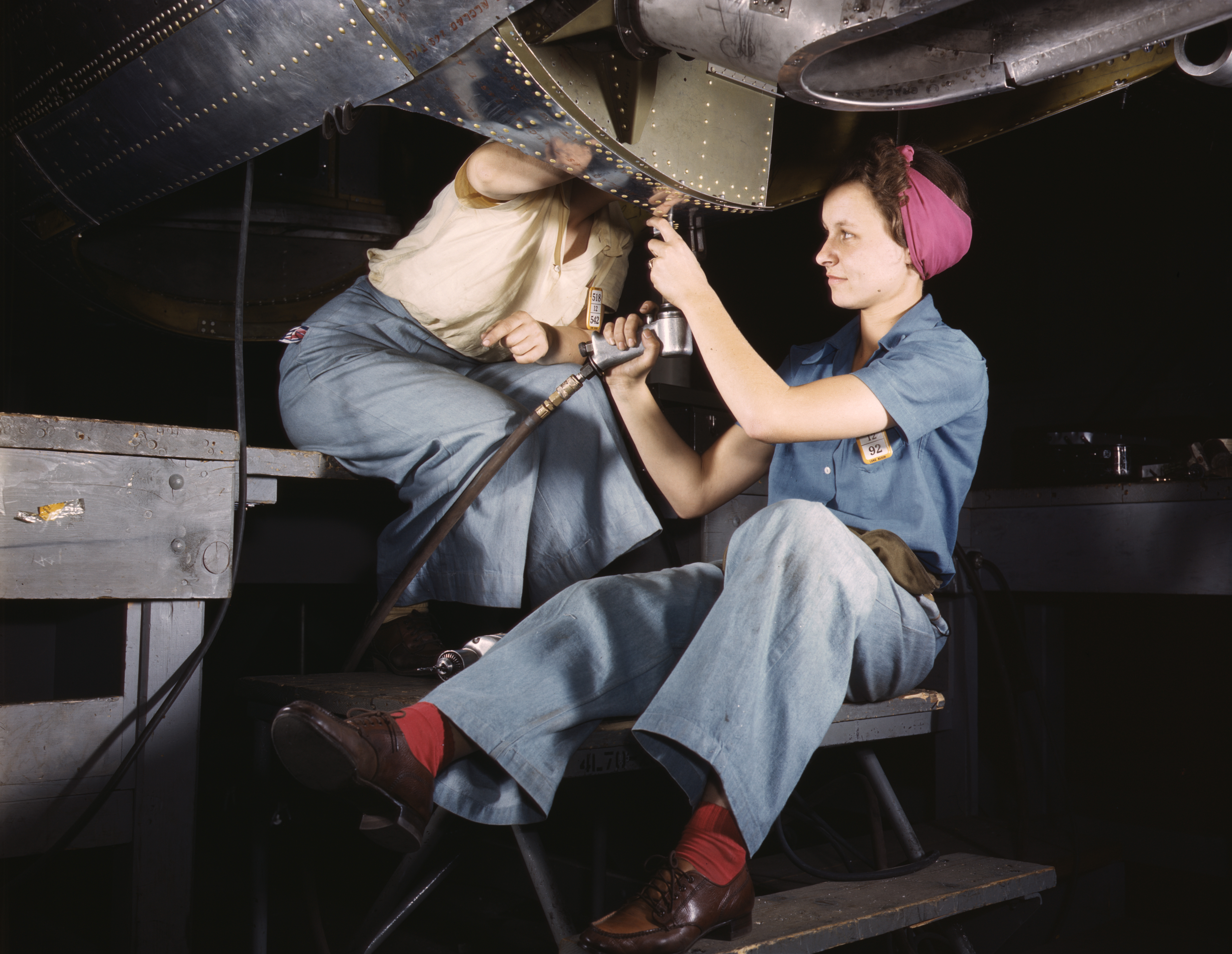
Women at work on bomber in 1942, Douglas Aircraft Company, Long Beach, California

Women quickly responded to Rosie the Riveter, who convinced them that they had a patriotic duty to enter the workforce. Some claim that she forever opened the work force for women, but others dispute that point, noting that many women were discharged after the war and their jobs were given to returning servicemen. These critics claim that when peace returned, few women returned to their wartime positions and instead resumed domestic vocations or transferred into sex-typed occupations such as clerical and service work.

For some, World War II represented a major turning point for women as they eagerly supported the war effort, but other historians emphasize that the changes were temporary and that immediately after the war was over, women were expected to return to traditional roles of wives and mothers. A third group has emphasized how the long-range significance of the changes brought about by the war provided the foundation for the contemporary woman's movement. Leila J. Rupp, in her study of World War II, wrote "For the first time, the working woman dominated the public image. Women, for the duration, were riveting housewives in slacks, not mother, domestic beings, or civilizers."

After the war, as the nation shifted to a time of peace, munitions factories closed and returning veterans had priorities for jobs. The "Rosies" knew that working in the factories was in fact a possibility for women, even though they did not reenter the job market in such large proportions again until the 1970s. By that time factory employment was in decline all over the country.

Elinor Otto, known as "Last Rosie the Riveter", built airplanes for 50 years, retiring at age 95.

== Homages ==
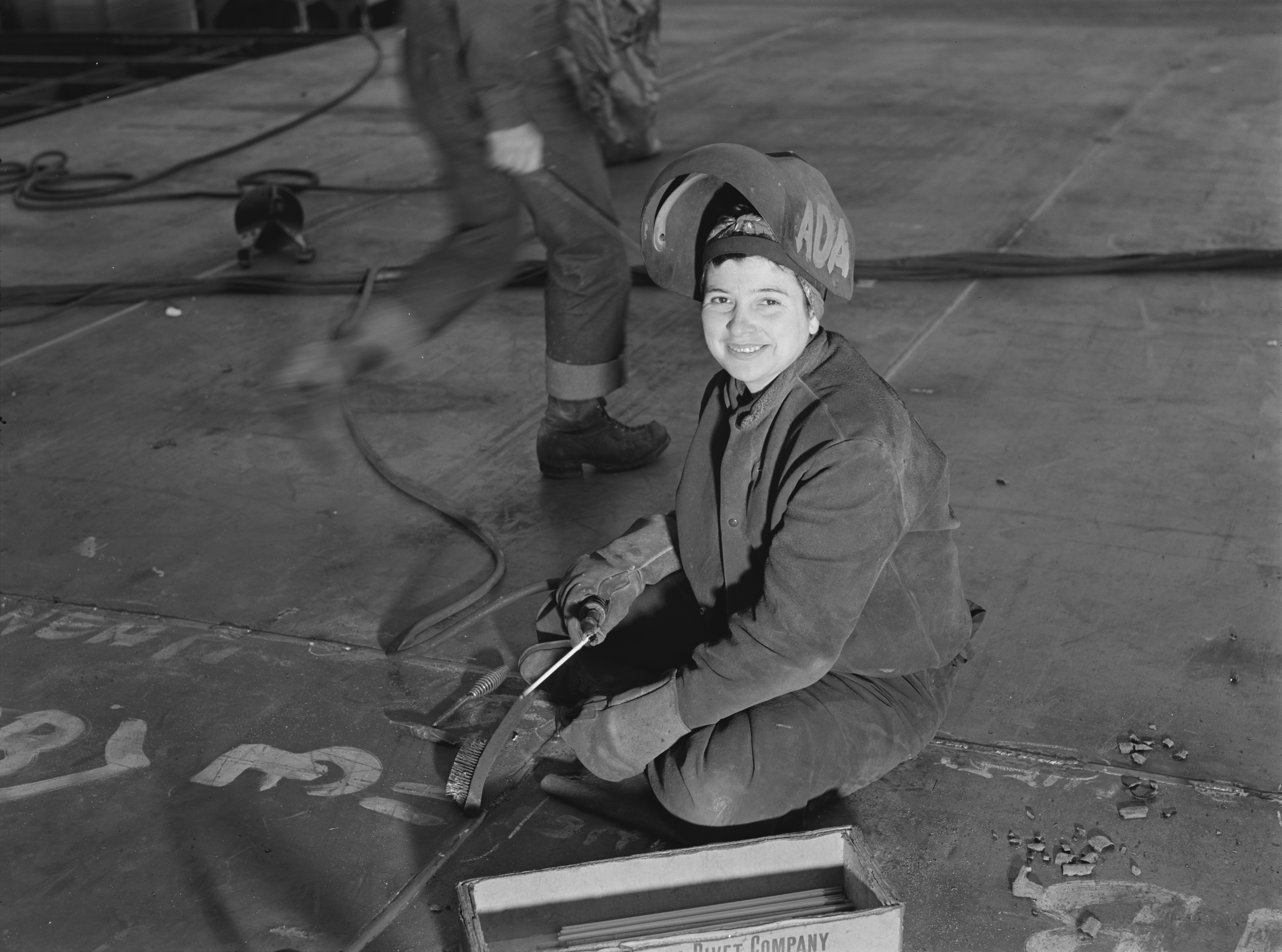
A "Wendy the Welder" at the Richmond Shipyards

According to Penny Colman's Rosie the Riveter, there was also, very briefly, a "Wendy the Welder" based on Janet Doyle, a worker at the Kaiser Richmond Liberty Shipyards in California.

In the 1960s, Hollywood actress Jane Withers gained fame as "Josephine the Plumber", a character in a long-running and popular series of television commercials for "Comet" cleansing powder that lasted into the 1970s. This character was based on the original "Rosie" character.

One of Carnival Cruise Line's ships, the Carnival Valor, has a restaurant located on the lido deck named Rosie's Restaurant. The restaurant is mostly a tribute to Rosie, but also contains artwork depicting other war-related manufacturing and labor.

In 2010, singer Pink paid tribute to Rosie by dressing as her for a portion of the music video for the song "Raise Your Glass".

The 2013 picture book Rosie Revere, Engineer by Andrea Beaty, features Rosie as "Great Great Aunt Rose" who "Worked building airplanes a long time ago". She inspires Rosie Revere, the young subject of the book, to continue striving to be a great engineer despite early failures. Rose is shown wielding a walking stick made from riveted aircraft aluminum.

Singer Beyoncé paid tribute to Rosie in July 2014, dressing as the icon and posing in front of a "We Can Do It!" sign often mistaken as part of the Rosie campaign. It garnered over 1.15 million likes, but sparked minor controversy when newspaper The Guardian criticized it.

Other recent cultural references include a "Big Daddy" enemy type called "Rosie" in the video game BioShock, armed with a rivet gun. There is a DC Comics character called Rosie the Riveter, who wields a rivet gun as a weapon (first appearing in Green Lantern vol. 2 No. 176, May 1984). In the video game Fallout 3 there are billboards featuring "Rosies" assembling atom bombs while drinking Nuka-Cola. Of the female hairstyles available for player characters in the sequel, one is titled "Wendy the Welder" as a pastiche.

Boeing Orbital Flight Test 2, an uncrewed test flight of the Boeing Starliner spacecraft to the International Space Station, carried an Anthropomorphic Test Device named "Rosie the Rocketeer." The device contained fifteen sensors to collect data on the effects of the flight on future passengers.

In 2024, singer Katy Perry paid tribute to Rosie by dressing as her for a portion of the music video for the song "Woman's World".

== Recognition ==
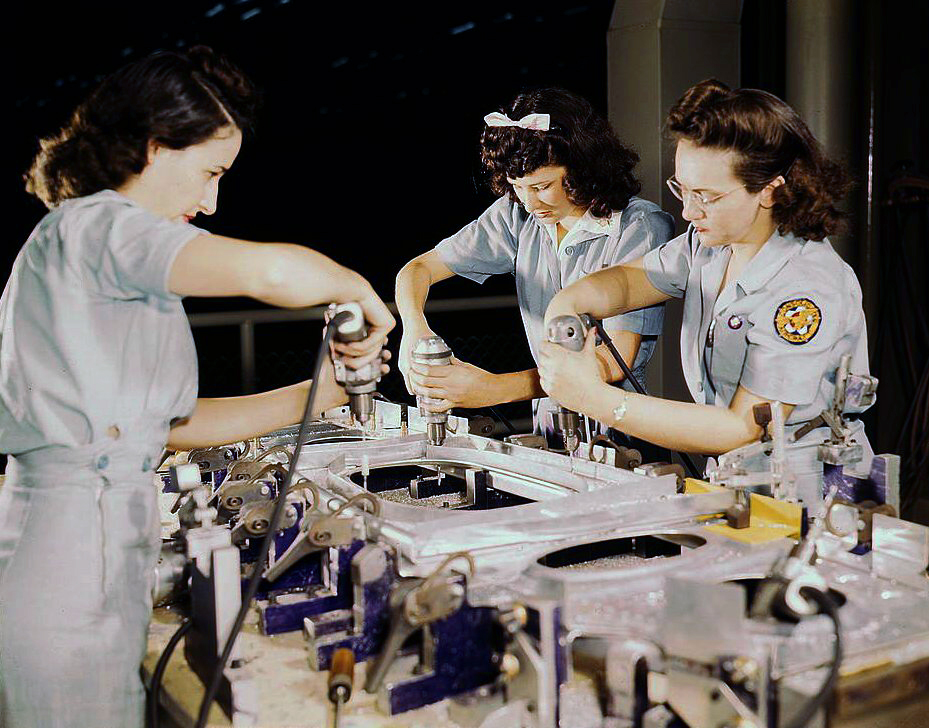
Assembling a wing section, Fort Worth, Texas, October 1942

The Life and Times of Rosie the Riveter by Connie Field is a 65-minute documentary from 1980 that tells the story of women's entrance into "men's work" during WWII. Rosies of the North is a 1999 National Film Board of Canada documentary film about Canadian "Rosies," who built fighter and bomber aircraft at the Canadian Car and Foundry, where Elsie MacGill was also the Chief Aeronautical Engineer.

John Crowley's 2009 historical novel Four Freedoms covers the wartime industries, and studies the real working conditions of many female industrial workers. "Rosie the Riveter" is frequently referenced.

On October 14, 2000, the Rosie the Riveter/World War II Home Front National Historical Park was opened in Richmond, California, site of four Kaiser Shipyards, where thousands of "Rosies" from around the country worked, although ships at the Kaiser yards were welded, not riveted. Over 200 former Rosies attended the ceremony.

In 2014, Phyllis Gould, one of the original Rosie the Riveters, visited President Barack Obama in support of a National Rosie the Riveter Day; the United States Senate approved the observance on March 21 in 2017. She also pushed for a Gold Medal for Rosies that will be given starting in 2022.

Also in 2014 a nationwide program, run by the organization Thanks! Plain and Simple, was founded to encourage cities to pick a project that "Rosies" can do with younger generations, in order to educate young people about women's roles in World War II, and to involve the "Rosies", many of whom have become isolated as they have gotten older, in community projects.

The name and logo of the Metropolitan Riveters, one of the founding members of the National Women's Hockey League, are inspired by the character of Rosie the Riveter.

The Rose City Riveters is the fan club for the Portland Thorns Football Club, a National Women's Soccer League team in Portland, Oregon, nicknamed the Rose City. They have taken their inspiration, and their name, from the 30,000 women who worked in the Portland shipyards in Portland during World War II.

The name and logo of Pittsburgh Riveters SC of the USL W League are also inspired by the character of Rosie the Riveter. The name was selected in a fan vote with an overwhelming majority. In addition to the industrial ties to the city of Pittsburgh, the artist of the iconic Westinghouse poster, J. Howard Miller, was also a native of the city. As such, the Rosie character featured in the team's logo is based on the version in Miller's poster.

After advocacy by Mae Krier, Rosie the Riveter Day was created in 2017. She accepted a Congressional Gold Medal representing the Rosies in 2024.

On November 11, 2025, 103-year-old Frances Mauro Masters was honored with a bronze statue for her service as an original Rosie the Riveter during WWII. The statue was unveiled at the Michigan WW2 Legacy Memorial in Royal Oak Memorial Park, Detroit, Michigan.

== Images ==
=== Westinghouse poster ===
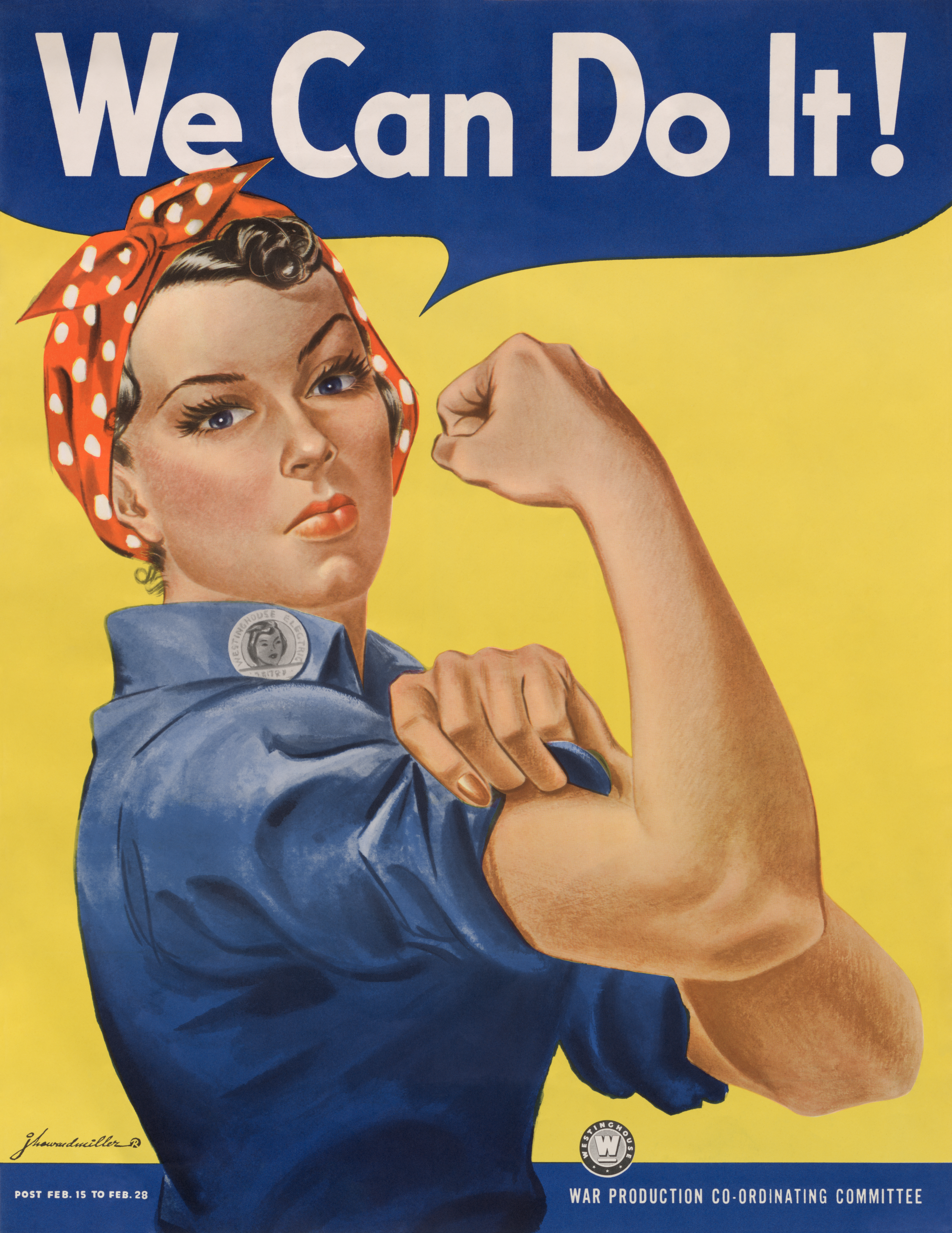
"We Can Do It!", by J. Howard Miller, was made as an inspirational image to boost worker morale.

In 1942, Pittsburgh artist J. Howard Miller was hired by the Westinghouse Company's War Production Coordinating Committee to create a series of posters for the war effort. One of these posters became the famous "We Can Do It!" image, an image that in later years would also be called "Rosie the Riveter" although it had never been given that title during the war. Miller is thought to have based his "We Can Do It!" poster on a United Press International wire service photograph taken of a young female war worker, widely but erroneously reported as being a photo of Michigan war worker Geraldine Hoff (later Doyle).

More recent evidence indicates that the formerly misidentified photo is actually of war worker Naomi Parker (later Fraley) taken at Alameda Naval Air Station in California. The "We Can Do It!" poster was displayed only to Westinghouse employees in the Midwest during a two-week period in February 1943; then it disappeared for nearly four decades. During the war, the name "Rosie" was not associated with the image, and the purpose of the poster was not to recruit women workers but to be motivational propaganda aimed at workers of both sexes already employed at Westinghouse. It was only later, in the early 1980s, that the Miller poster was rediscovered and became famous, associated with feminism, and often mistakenly called "Rosie the Riveter".

=== Saturday Evening Post ===
Norman Rockwell's Saturday Evening Post 1943 cover featuring Rosie the Riveter

External videos
- Norman Rockwell, Rosie the Riveter, 7:15, Smarthistory

Norman Rockwell's image of "Rosie the Riveter" received mass distribution on the cover of The Saturday Evening Post on Memorial Day, May 29, 1943. Rockwell's illustration features a brawny woman taking her lunch break with a rivet gun on her lap and beneath her penny loafer a copy of Adolf Hitler's manifesto, Mein Kampf. Her lunch box reads "Rosie"; viewers quickly recognized that to be "Rosie the Riveter" from the familiar song.

Rockwell, America's best-known popular illustrator of the day, based the pose of his 'Rosie' on that of Michelangelo's 1509 painting Prophet Isaiah from the Sistine Chapel ceiling. Rosie is holding a ham sandwich in her left hand, and her blue overalls are adorned with badges and buttons: a Red Cross blood donor button, a white "V for Victory" button, a Blue Star Mothers pin, an Army-Navy E Service production award pin, two bronze civilian service awards, and her personal identity badge.

Rockwell's model was a Vermont resident, 19-year-old Mary Louise Doyle, who was a telephone operator near where Rockwell lived, not a riveter. Rockwell painted his "Rosie" as a larger woman than his model, and he later phoned to apologize. According to two of Doyle's obituaries, "twenty-four years after Doyle posed, Rockwell sent Doyle a letter calling her the most beautiful woman he'd ever seen and apologizing for the hefty body in the painting. 'I did have to make you into a sort of a giant,' he wrote."

In a post interview, Mary explained that she was actually holding a sandwich while posing for the poster and that the rivet-gun she was holding was fake, she never saw Mein Kampf, and she did have a white handkerchief in her pocket like the picture depicts. The Post's cover image proved hugely popular, and the magazine loaned it to the United States Department of the Treasury for the duration of the war, for use in war bond drives.

After the war, the Rockwell "Rosie" was seen less and less because of a general policy of vigorous copyright protection by the Rockwell estate. In 2002, the original painting sold at Sotheby's for nearly $5 million. In June 2009 the Crystal Bridges Museum of American Art in Bentonville, Arkansas, acquired Norman Rockwell's iconic Rosie the Riveter painting for its permanent collection from a private collector.

In late 1942, Doyle posed twice for Rockwell's photographer, Gene Pelham, as Rockwell preferred to work from still images rather than live models. The first photo was not suitable, because she wore a blouse rather than a blue work shirt. In total, she was paid $10 for her modeling work, equivalent to $186 in 2025. In 1949, she married Robert J. Keefe, to become Mary Doyle Keefe. The Keefes were invited and present in 2002 when the Rockwell painting was sold at Sotheby's.

In an interview in 2014, Keefe said that she had no idea what impact the painting would have. "I didn't expect anything like this, but as the years went on, I realized that the painting was famous," she said. Keefe died on April 21, 2015, in Connecticut at the age of 92.

== See also ==
- Greatest Generation
- United States home front during World War II
- American women in World War II
- Women in the United States labor force from 1945 to 1950
- Woman's Land Army of America ("farmettes")
- Margaret Bourke-White

International:

- Australian Women's Land Army
- Canary girl – British women working in munitions
- Ronnie the Bren Gun Girl – the earlier Canadian equivalent
- Ruby Loftus Screwing a Breech-ring, a 1943 painting showing a female British war worker
- Women's Land Army – British farm workers ("land girls")
- Women in the World Wars
  - Women in World War II

General:

- Women in the workforce
- Work ethic
