= No Woman Born =

American 1944 science fiction book

- Author: C. L. Moore
- Language: English
- Genre: Utopian, feminist science fiction
- Publication date: December 1944
- Publication place: United States

No Woman Born is a utopian story from 1944, written by American feminist C. L. Moore. The book describes a former singing superstar, turned robot after a fire accident. The story touches on many feminist themes and discusses problems that could occur with science fiction technology. It is often called the first story on cyborgs.

== Plot summary ==
“No Woman Born” is a dramatic story first published in Astounding Science Fiction (December 1944). It was regarded as an extremely well-done and popular piece when first published. The story is set in New York City in the future. Deirdre, one of the three main characters, is a beautiful and popular singer, actress, and dancer. She is referred to as “the loveliest creature whose image ever moved along the airways.” She is tragically injured in a theater fire and the whole world is saddened by her loss. A male scientist by the name of Maltzer quickly works to try to save Deirdre's body before it is too late. He places her ‘body’, her brain, into a new metal body. Maltzer, along with Deirdre's manager Harris, work with her over the next year to ensure that she will be fit to return to the public after her transformation.

The new Deirdre is a slender golden robot. Instead of a face, she has blank features and a crescent-shaped mask of blue glass where her eyes would otherwise be. After an initial shock, Harris quickly accepts that the robot is Deirdre, because the voice sounds like Deirdre’s and the robot moves just like Deirdre used to move. Deirdre explains that her brain is controlling her movements and voice and her brain is still the same, even if her body is not. Deirdre also tells him that she is not immortal, even though her robot body theoretically is. But her brain will age and eventually die and then her body will just be inanimate metal.

All this has taken place before the story opens. Harris loves Deirdre and only wants the best for her. Maltzer, however, is beset by doubts of her remaining humanity. Deirdre eventually decides that she is ready, and wants to perform for the public again on television in her new form. She has great hopes that the public will accept her for who she is and will still consider her a person. Maltzer, however, doubts that her return will be as smooth as she imagines. Harris, who previously supported her, is also not sure about Deirdre returning to the public. Maltzer and Harris are both possessive over Deirdre, often referring to her as their “dear”. Deirdre announces to Harris and Maltzer that she has already arranged to have a surprise TV performance later in the day, and also mentions that neither Maltzer nor Harris have any say in her decision. Maltzer may have built her body, but he does not own her. They are not pleased with how she is acting and do not believe she will ever be able to live as a human on Earth. Maltzer speculates that it may have been preferable if he had let her die after the fire. Contrary to Maltzer and Harris's beliefs, Deirdre's first comeback performance is a spectacular success.

The positive reaction from the audience has influenced Harris's ideas on Deirdre to change; he now becomes more relaxed with the situation. Maltzer is still dubious, believing Deirdre's public will eventually turn on her. He again states that he knows Deirdre better than she knows herself. Harris tries to calm Maltzer down throughout his turmoil and Maltzer throws him out. Deirdre sees his frustration and takes a two-week break from performing to let him calm down. This break, however, does not calm him. Maltzer, on the verge of a nervous breakdown, threatens suicide by climbing out the high apartment window where he is meeting with Deirdre and Harris; but Deirdre rescues him by moving at superspeed across the room in a motion described as one which "negated time and destroyed space." After a mass of events, Deirdre admits that she is not happy, and agrees that she is straying farther away from humanity. She also states she wants to continue performing because it is the only thing that allows her to feel as if she is truly part of humanity.

== Science fiction and feminist themes ==
The use of cyborgs in the story emphasized the feminist theme by including ideas revolving around body image in women. The main female character, Deirdre, was mainly praised for her looks; after becoming a cyborg, there was fear that her audience would lose interest in her, or be unable to accept her as the same person she was before the reconstruction of her outward form. This was meant to emphasize the fact that depictions of women in the media are frequently centered around their looks and appearance rather than their personality or intelligence. Her manager and doctor's doubt in her ability to keep an audience after her appearance changed depicts how artificially valued her looks were before the accident.

== Historical context ==
The historical and social context of the story reflects much of World War II, since the story takes place directly after the war. It criticizes the reversion to social gender norms post-war after women had already proven their ability to do men's work "Neither Normal nor Human": The Cyborg in C. L. Moore's "No Woman Born". A major implication was that during the war, many men were disabled and looked to technology to resume living their previous life. The cyborg aspect of the story is reflective of men's use of technology. Because a woman became a cyborg, it criticizes the idea that only men have access to technology and its benefits. Post-war, men were encouraged to adapt to new technologies and new ways of life while women were forced back to their domestic duties and limited opportunities. Deidre's possession of cyborg technology directly opposes the post-war resolution and advocates for women's place in the field of technology.
