= Geraldine Doyle =

American woman (1924–2010)

- Hoff in 1942
- Born: Geraldine Hoff; July 31, 1924; Inkster, Michigan, U.S.
- Died: December 26, 2010 (aged 86); Lansing, Michigan, U.S.
- Known for: Disproved claim to be the model for the "We Can Do It!" poster
- Spouse: Leo H. Doyle (m. 1943; died 2010)
- Children: 6

Geraldine Doyle (née Hoff; July 31, 1924 – December 26, 2010) was an American woman who had been widely and mistakenly promoted in the media as the possible real-life model for the World War II era "We Can Do It!" poster, later thought to be an embodiment of the iconic World War II character Rosie the Riveter; however, it was later shown that the 1942 news wire service photograph likely depicts another young war worker, Naomi Parker.

== Life ==
Geraldine Doyle was born in Inkster, Michigan. Her father, Cornelious, was an electrical contractor who died of pneumonia when she was 10 years old. Her mother, Augusta, was a composer who had scoliosis. After graduating from high school in Ann Arbor, Michigan, in 1942 Hoff found work as a metal presser in the American Broach & Machine Co. of Ann Arbor. As men started enlisting and being drafted into military service for World War II, women began to support the war effort by taking on roles, including factory work, that were formerly considered "male-only."

Because she was a cellist, Doyle feared a hand injury from the metal pressing machines, and left the factory after having worked there for only two weeks. During the brief time she worked there, according to Doyle, a United Press International photographer took a picture of her. Soon after quitting work as a metal presser, Geraldine Doyle met and married dentist Leo Doyle in 1943. The couple had six children and remained married until his death in February 2010.

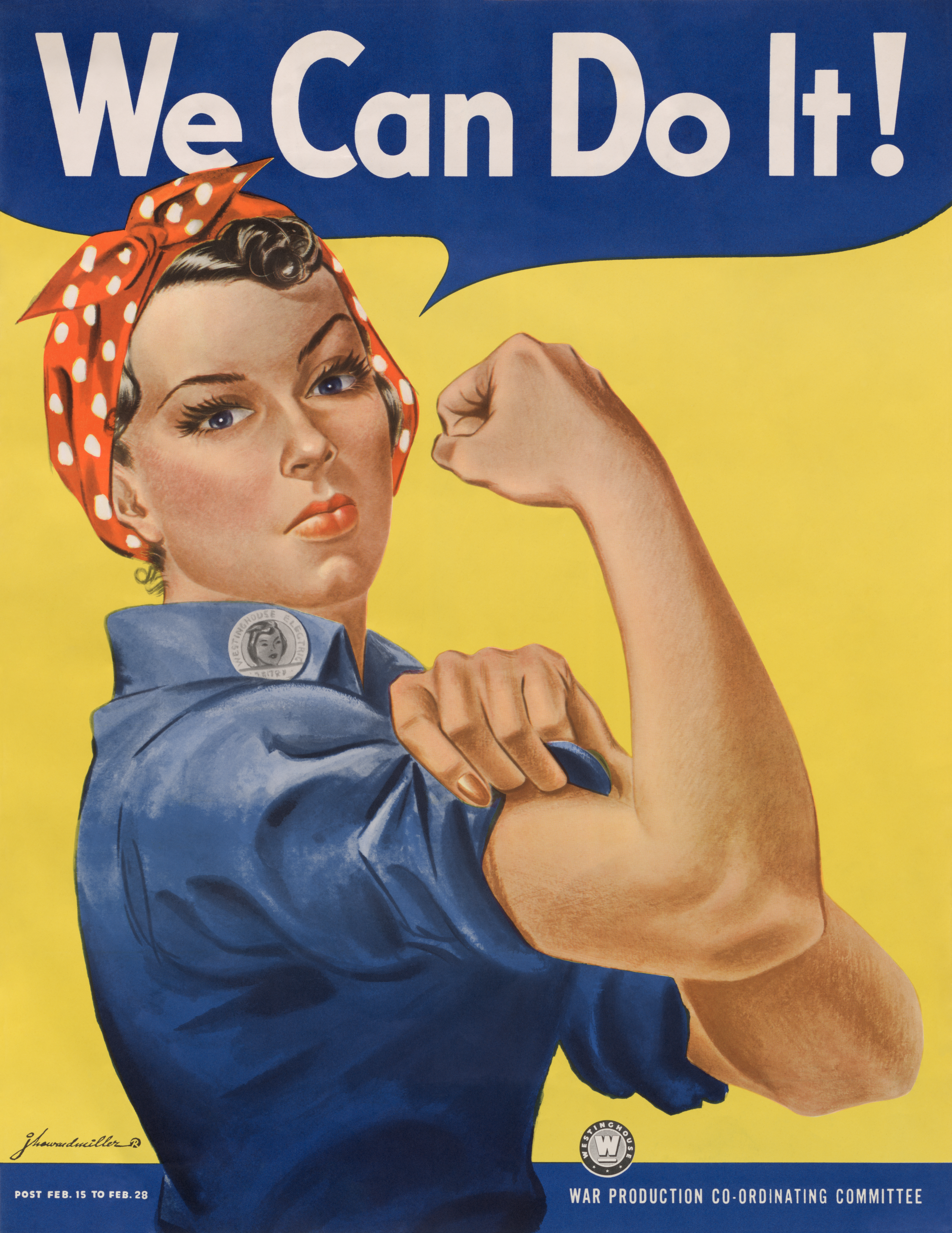
Geraldine Doyle claimed to have been the model for the "We Can Do It!" poster.

== Claim of connection to "We Can Do It!" poster ==
Because the "We Can Do It!" poster was created for an internal Westinghouse project, it did not become widely known until the 1980s, when it was rediscovered and used by advocates of women's equality in the workplace. In 1984, Doyle came across an article in Modern Maturity magazine which showed a photo of an unidentified young war worker at a turret lathe. In 1994, Doyle saw the "We Can Do It!" poster on the cover of the Smithsonian magazine. Doyle felt she recognized herself in both the photo and the poster and in the 1990s communicated with historian and author Penny Colman of her connection to the photo and therefore to the poster. News media outlets, upon Doyle's death, memorialized her as the model for the famous poster, without citing evidence beyond Doyle's assertions. Doyle assumed that the photograph had inspired the poster. Later investigation, however, suggests that the press photo most likely shows California war worker Naomi Parker, the photo taken at Naval Air Station Alameda in March 1942, at a time when Doyle was attending high school. Doyle did not claim to have met or sat for poster artist J. Howard Miller, but only to have been the woman depicted in this particular press photo which many believe inspired the poster. The ACME Newspictures wire service image of Naomi Parker was used as the cover image for the Time-Life book The Patriotic Tide: 1940–1950 published in 1986.

The "We Can Do It!" image remains an icon and appeared on a 1999 postage stamp as part of a World War II series produced by the U.S. Postal Service.

== Death ==
Geraldine Hoff Doyle died on December 26, 2010, in Lansing, Michigan, as a result of complications from severe arthritis.
