= Elinor Otto =

American factory worker (1919–2023)

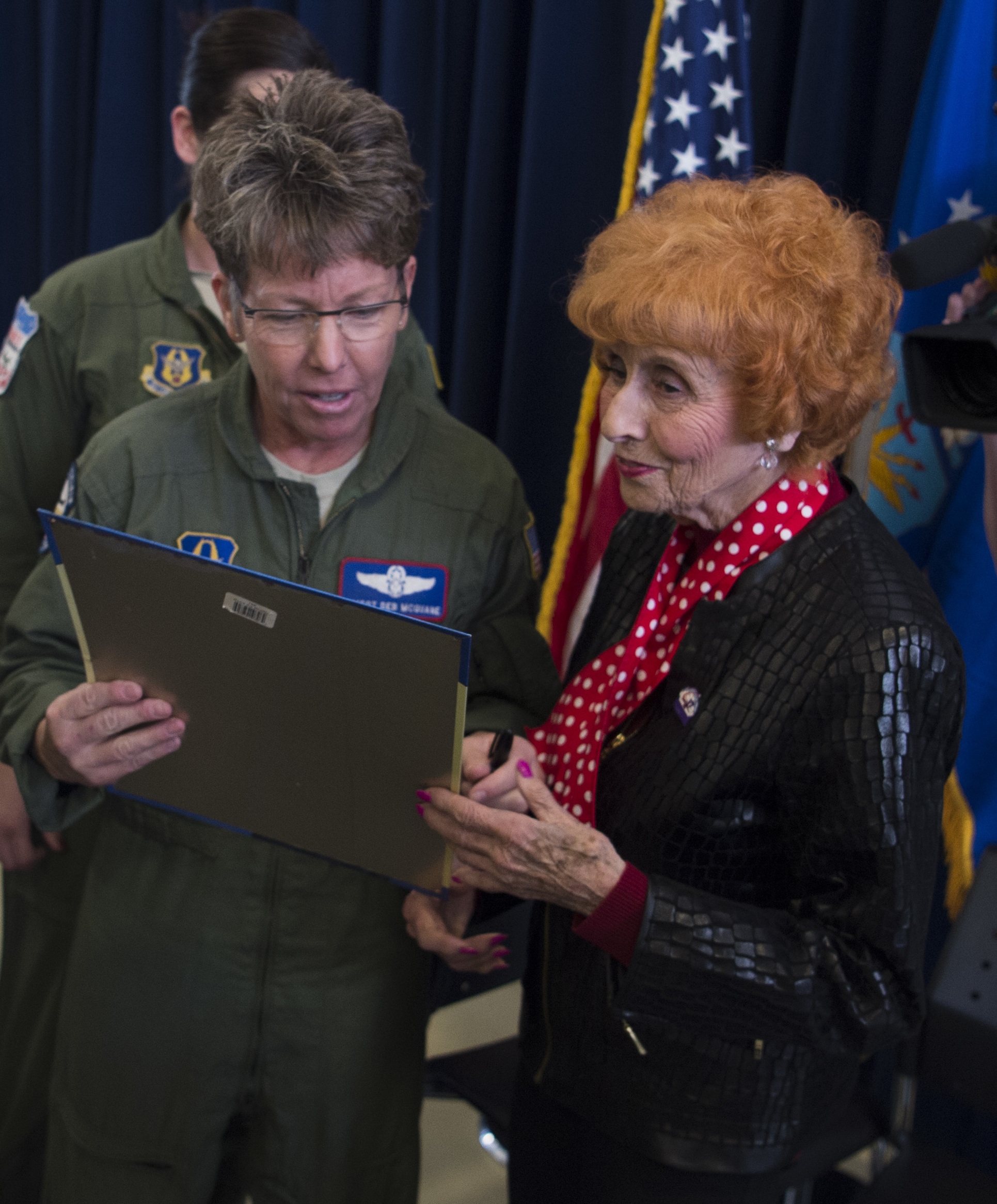
Otto (right) with U.S. Air Force Chief Master Sgt. Deborah McGuane in 2017

Elinor Otto (October 28, 1919 – November 12, 2023) was an American factory worker who was an original "Rosie the Riveter". She built airplanes for over a half-century, and spent many years working for Boeing before retiring at age 95. She was known as the "Last Serving Rosie the Riveter".

== Early life and World War II ==
Elinor Otto was born in Los Angeles on October 28, 1919.

The name "Rosie" was given to women who took on the thousands of jobs left vacant after men had departed for the war. Otto began working at the Rohr Aircraft Corporation in Chula Vista, California, during World War II. She joined the war effort with her two sisters, one of whom worked with her at Rohr. When Otto first joined Rohr, she was recently single and was taking care of her young son. She earned 65 cents an hour in 1942.

== Post-World War II ==
Otto mainly worked for economic reasons, because she had to take care of her mother and son. She has also said that, "I'm a working person, I guess. I like to work. I like to be around people that work. I like to get up, get out of the house, get something accomplished during the day."

After the war ended, all the working women were let go. Otto tried out other jobs, like office work, but she hated being still. She also worked as a carhop until roller skates were added to the uniform. In 1951, she went back to factory work.

For 14 years, she worked at Ryan Aeronautical Co. in San Diego. Later she was employed at Douglas Aircraft Company, which merged with McDonnell Aircraft, and later became part of Boeing.

By 2014, Otto had worked on every single C-17 plane at the Boeing plant. She retired in November 2014.

Otto appeared at the Veterans Day Parade in New York City and on The Ellen DeGeneres Show and The Today Show.

After living in Long Beach, California for 55 years, Otto moved to North Las Vegas, Nevada in 2019. She died from a stroke at Centennial Hills Hospital in Las Vegas on November 12, 2023, at the age of 104.

== Awards and honors ==
In November 2014, Otto was honored for her contributions to the military with the Lillian K. Keil award from the American Veterans Center. She received the special award with eight other honorees.

Otto was honored by the California State Assembly member Bonnie Lowenthal as the 70th Assembly District Woman of the Year in 2014.

Otto received the Air Force Association's 2017 Lifetime Achievement Award at the annual Air, Space & Cyber Conference in September 2017.

In December 2017, Otto flew in one of the C-17s she'd worked on, in a ceremonial flight flown by Air Mobility Command head Gen. Carlton Everhart at March ARB, California.

In 2019, a bar named after Elinor Otto opened in Long Beach, California.
