= Veronica Foster =

Canadian cultural icon during the Second World War

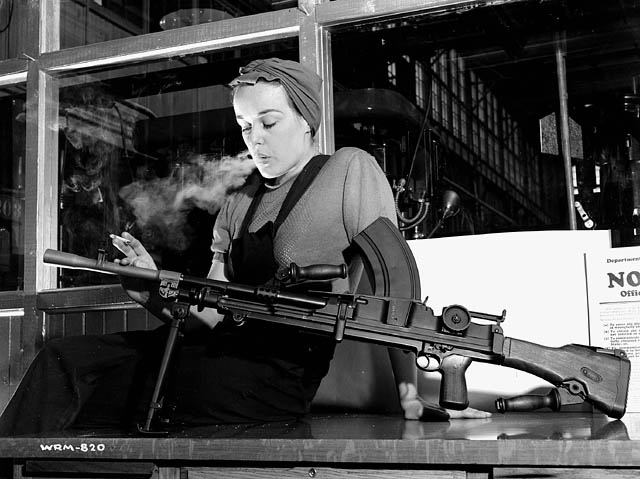
- "Ronnie, the Bren Gun Girl" posing with a finished Bren gun
- Born: 2 January 1922; Montreal, Quebec, Canada
- Died: 4 May 2000 (aged 78); Toronto, Ontario, Canada
- Other names: "Ronnie, the Bren Gun Girl"
- Known for: Canadian Second World War cultural icon
- Spouse: George Guerrette

Veronica Foster (January 2, 1922 – May 4, 2000), popularly known as "Ronnie, the Bren Gun Girl", was a Canadian icon representing nearly one million Canadian women who worked in the manufacturing plants that produced munitions, weapons, and equipment during the Second World War.

Foster worked for John Inglis Company Ltd. producing Bren light machine guns on a production line on Strachan Avenue in Toronto, Ontario. While working at the John Inglis Company Ltd. she was photographed for a propaganda campaign spearheaded by the National Film Board (NFB). Her pictures were used to encourage Canadian women to participate in the war efforts. The pictures of Foster and their impact on Canadian women also inspired the creation of the American cultural icon "Rosie, the Riveter" in the United States of America. She can be seen as the Canadian precursor to Rosie.

She became popular after a series of propaganda posters were produced; most images featured her working for the war effort, but others depicted more casual settings like Foster dancing the jitterbug or attending a dinner party. After the war, she worked as a singer with Mart Kenney and His Western Gentlemen, where she met trombonist George Guerrette, whom she subsequently married. She died on May 4, 2000.

In 2000, Canada Post commemorated her influence through the creation of a stamp line featuring Foster. Moreover, in 2016, Canadian Broadcast Corporation featured Foster in their six-part series titled, "Love, Hate, and Propaganda." In 2016, her impact was also highlighted in an art history exhibition, "The Other NFB" curated by Carol Payne and Sandra Dyck.

== Early life ==
On January 2, 1922, Veronica Foster was born in Montreal, Quebec, to Daniel Leo Foster and Catherine Francis Empey Foster. She had seven siblings, four brothers and three sisters. At a young age, she moved to the Christie Pits area in Toronto, Ontario, with her mother and siblings, though as a teenager she frequently moved between both Toronto and Montreal. In her free time, her favourite things to do were playing golf and making charcoal drawings.

== Foster in the Second World War ==
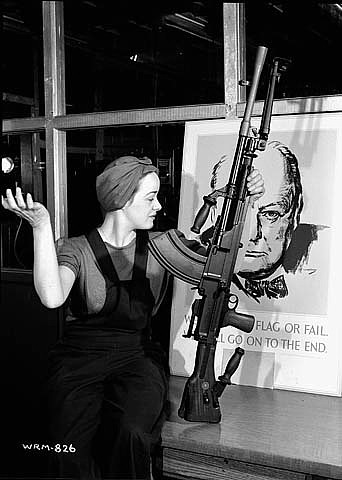
Veronica Foster holding a newly assembled Bren Gun

In 1941, at the age of nineteen, Veronica Foster started working at the John Inglis Company Ltd. on Strachan Avenue in Toronto. John Inglis Company Ltd. was a massive facility that covered 23 acres, with thousands of other women working alongside Veronica in the manufacturing of Bren light and reliable machine guns used by Canadian and British soldiers. Between 1939 and 1945, the company produced over 40,000 Bren light guns. Prior to the outbreak of the Second World War, the factory focused on creating appliances and machinery. Later on, the factory transformed and focused on the creation of guns due to a change in ownership. In 1939, when the Second World War broke out, the Canadian government was desperately looking to solve the labour supply shortages that came with men vacating positions to fight in the war. As a result, Canada turned to extending factory jobs to women. In May 1941, Foster then began working in the John Inglis Company making Bren Light Machine guns. She was discovered by the National Film Board (NFB), which had recently been assigned as the official photographer for the Canadian Government. The NFB chose Foster as the poster girl of their new campaign.

Foster's family also contributed to the war efforts, as three of her four brothers enlisted to be a part of the Canadian armed forces during the war.

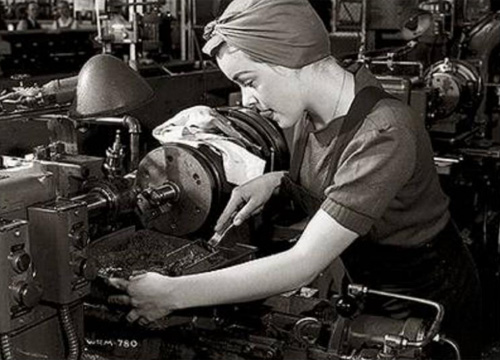
Veronica Foster working hard and creating guns for John Inglis Company Ltd. to aid Canada during WWII

=== "Ronnie, the Bren Gun Girl" ===
The National Film Board was assigned the task of running a poster campaign to attract women to work in the factories. Foster was chosen to be the poster girl for the NFB campaign that would later make her into a national icon, representing many more Canadian women who worked manufacturing jobs during the war. The photo series that was featured in Star Weekly magazine showing Foster with recently assembled Bren guns earned her the nickname of "Ronnie, The Bren Gun Girl." The National Film Board crafted a series of photographs of Foster not only being hard at work, but also doing other activities outside of machine gun manufacturing. The photographs depicted her going to dinner parties in lavish clothes, dancing the jitterbug at the Glen Eagle Country Club, and playing baseball. The most famous photographs from the "Ronnie, The Bren Gun Girl" shoot showed her with her hair tied up in a headscarf, wearing a worker's uniform and smoking beside a Bren machine gun. Foster's daughter revealed that despite being photographed as smoking in the pictures, Veronica Foster never smoked outside of shooting pictures as "Ronnie" for NFB.

The NFB's primary aim for the campaign was to encourage all women to participate in the war efforts by working. while also displaying the maintenance of women's glamour and femininity. Canadian national identity and patriotism were instilled and promoted through these photos, which captured everyday Canadian life, rather than nationalistic photographs of Canadian monuments, territories, or significant political events. These images provided a sense of familiarity and collectivity among Canadian society, thus motivating women to join the war industry to show their continuous support for Canada. The campaign turned her into a national icon, representing a glamourized and ideal patriotic image of Canadian women working in the munition manufacturing industries during the Second World War. Foster would inspire more than one million women all across Canada to join the war industry's workforce in support of Canada.

== Later life ==
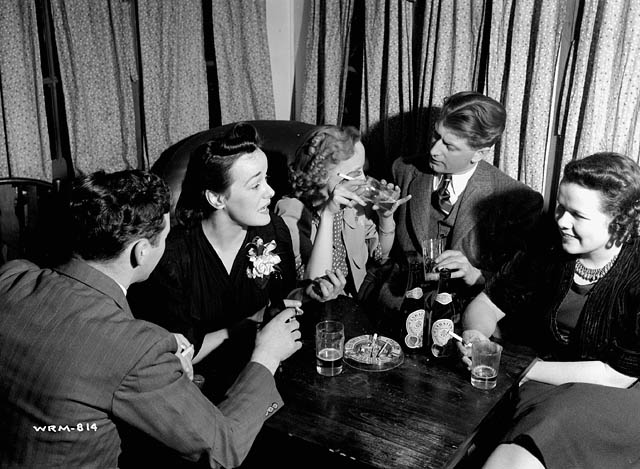
Veronica Foster enjoying a beer with friends at the Glen Eagle Country Club

Once the war had ended, men returned to the workforce, displacing a majority of women who had found careers during the war, including Foster. Around the year 1943, Foster joined the Canadian band, Mart Kenney and his Western Gentlemen, as their new vocalist. Although she was not part of any commercial recordings, the Western Gentlemen and she made appearances on the CBC radio program, 'Sweet and Low,' until 1949. There was increased exposure for the band through this program, resulting in tours and recurring performances at the Royal York Hotel in Toronto.

Through the band, Foster fell in love with George Guerette, the band's trombonist. By 1944, Foster decided to depart from Kenney's band. She continued to perform with other musical groups, such as the Trump Davidson Orchestra, while also pursuing a career in modeling. Foster and Guerrette eventually got married in 1945, settling in Guerette's hometown in Edmundston, N.B. Together, they have five children. Music played an important role in the Foster-Guerette family, with one of their sons, George Guerrette going into the film industry and also playing the trombone, like his father. After Foster's husband's death in 1963, she decided to move back to Toronto. There, she changed career paths from a vocalist and model to become a real estate agent. She worked as a real estate agent until her death in May, 2000.

== Her influence ==
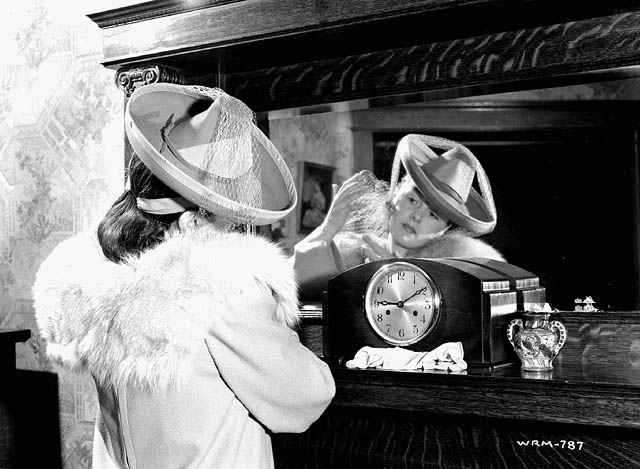
Veronica Foster getting ready to attend a party at the Glen Eagle Country Club

Foster's representation as "the Bren Gun Girl", wearing her iconic red headscarf and overalls, is often seen as embodying the perfect blend of femininity and female liberation, so much so that she presented the basis of inspiration for America's own propaganda image of "Rosie, the Riveter."

Today, many refer to Ronnie, the Bren Gun Girl in relation to third-wave feminist ideologies, with her representation seen as embodying women's choice to express their femininity, beauty, and sexuality as they please as a way to resist oppression and objectification. Although Foster is often referred to as being a symbol of women empowerment during the Second World War, she is also perceived as upholding the narrative of women as primarily through their beauty and femininity, and not necessarily by the jobs they occupied. This image, to some extent, would help maintain the dominance of the patriarchal system and the gender dynamics it promoted. Indeed, Foster showed the public, and fellow women in particular, that they could still be beautiful in their uniforms. Her handkerchief became an important part of this narrative as it was a central part of women's industry uniform, protecting them from exposure to chemicals and from getting their hair caught in machinery. It also allowed them to tap into their femininity while on the job, as well as served to further differentiate them from men who wore hats. The National Film Board also captured her outside of the factory, posing in elegant civilian clothing, drinking beer and dancing with her coworkers. This showed that although she worked in a factory, her femininity remained intact. These images glamourized working in the war industry, and served to entice other women to also join, while reminding them that they should remember to honour their femininity.

While her image promoted the new role for women's involvement in the workforce, it also emphasized the idea that women should still be feminine while working in the war industry and that their roles were not directly comparable to that of their male counterparts. This would later facilitate their transition back into the private domestic sphere and back to pink-collar jobs as men came back from the war, taking back the positions they had left behind in wartime.

== Women's role in the Second World War ==
During the Second World War, Veronica Foster joined around 1,200,000 women in holding permanent jobs during the war, 50,000 of which served in the Canadian armed force. Canadian women were largely solicited to replace the men who had left vacant positions behind to go fight at the forefront of the war. Women, thus, came to occupy positions that were traditionally held by men. They filled positions in munitions factories and other industries, such as agriculture, textile and service industries in record numbers. Approximately 261,000 women took part in the production of war goods, representing around 30 per cent of the aircraft industry, close to 50 percent of gun plant employees, and a majority in munition inspections. Women enthusiastically embraced their new roles and responsibilities as gendered spaces seemingly started changing, which allowed women to play a greater role in society for the time being. However, working-class women had started taking part in the industrial workforce far before the war, and the shift in representation in the workforce came mainly from middle-class women taking on factory jobs.

Despite women's significant role in operating behind the scenes of the war, their role is largely undocumented or unknown. Ronnie, the Bren Gun Girl, for example, is rarely mentioned in documentations of the war, with her role often being overshadowed by her American counterpart – Rosie, the Riveter. Although the propaganda images created during the Second World War were perceived as a popular representation of women's power to create change, the intent behind these images was not to challenge the pre-war gendered social dynamics. Instead, many images of women during the war were "glamourized, feminized, and sexualized [...] in order to defuse potential threat that women, who were temporarily taking new roles, might pose to the stability of society and the dominance of patriarchy".

Furthermore, much of the training women were subjected to in factory jobs involved de-skilling – in other words the breaking down of a job into smaller, more manageable tasks and then assigning those smaller tasks to women. This would make it easier to replace these women by more skilled workers (i.e. men returning from war). Beauty contests, like the Miss War Beauty contest, were also very common for women munition workers to prove that women could still be beautiful and feminine even in their factory uniform. Some media would explicitly refer to women's beauty as a form of patriotism, claiming that the best way for women to express patriotism was "by having beautiful bodies". This and many other propaganda efforts served to remind society of women workers' different status when compared to men: they were not just workers but "special, temporary, feminized workers". After the war ended, many women would therefore end up returning to their pre-war occupations as housewives and mothers, and return to pink-collar jobs as nurses, midwives, secretaries and telephone operators.

== Death and legacy ==
Foster died on May 4, 2000, in Toronto, Ontario, at the age of 78. On May 8, 2020, which marked the 75th anniversary of the Victory in Europe (V-E) day, Foster's achievements were commemorated through Canada Posts' creation of stamps in her honour. Foster's and other Canadian women's stories of participation in the Second World War were referenced in the National Film Board of Canada documentary, Rosies of the North. Her photos were available for viewing at the Robert McLaughlin Gallery in Oshawa from March to May 2016, in order to highlight her profound influence in the Second World War in inspiring women to join the workforce.

In 2014, Canada's Broadcast Corporation (CBC) Radio produced a six part series on Love, Hate, and Propaganda that featured a segment on Veronica Foster and her contribution in the Second World War in the third episode, "Meet the Enemy." Though, the excerpt was later edited by Foster's son to include more information about her life and work.

Moreover, in 2016, Foster was also featured in an exhibition titled, "the other NFB" curated by Carol Payne, an arts history professor at Carleton University and Sandra Dyck, the director of the Carleton Gallery. The exhibition displayed the life of Canadians through showcasing an extensive photograph collection containing 89 pictures from years 1941–1984 taken by NFB during their role as the "official photographer" for the Canadian government.

== Gallery ==
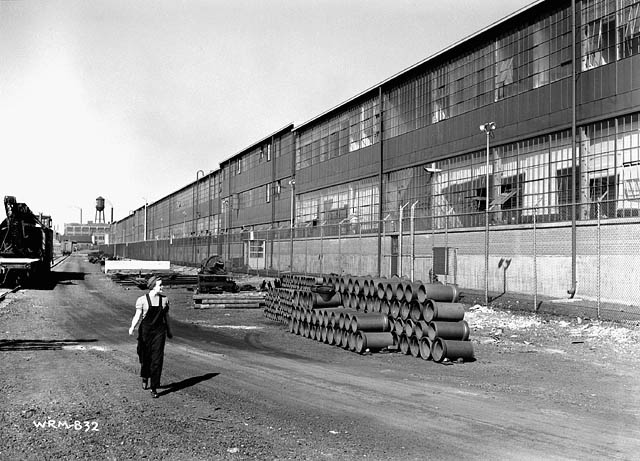
Foster outside the John Inglis Plant

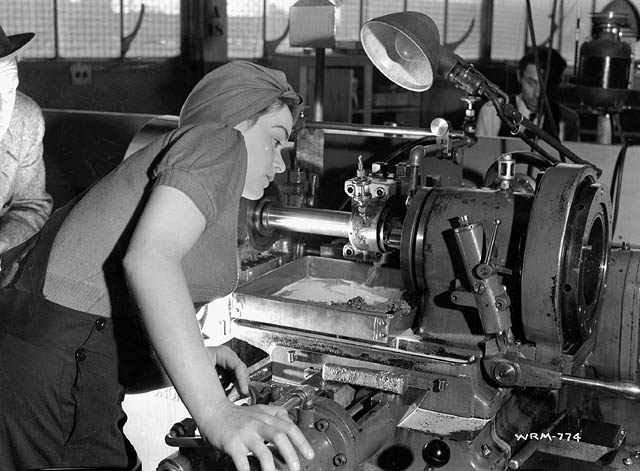
Veronica Foster inspects a lathe at the John Inglis & Co. Bren gun plant, May 1941

== See also ==
- Naomi Parker Fraley
- Pasha Angelina

== Bibliography ==
- "BC Radio History and Mart Kenney." Accessed March 18, 2022. https://bcradiohistory.com/Biographies/Kenney.htm.
- Fonow, Mary Margaret. Union Women: Forging Feminism in the United Steelworkers of America. U of Minnesota Press, 2003.
- "Guest Post: Rosie the Riveter and Ronnie the Bren Gun Girl: Exploring the Historical Roots of a Gendered Visual Symbol." Unwritten Histories. February 7, 2017. http://www.unwrittenhistories.com/guest-post-rosie-the-riveter-and-ronnie-the-bren-gun-girl-exploring-the-historical-roots-of-a-gendered-visual-symbol/.
- Films, Memoir. Ronnie The Bren Gun Girl. YouTube. October 6, 2012. Video, 5:20. https://www.youtube.com/watch?v=-E0KvWve-9g.
- "Mart Kenney and His Western Gentlemen." The Canadian Encyclopedia. Accessed March 18, 2022. https://www.thecanadianencyclopedia.ca/en/article/mart-kenney-and-his-western-gentlemen-emc.
- "Ronnie -The Bren Gun Girl." Canadians At Arms. Accessed March 18, 2022 https://canadiansatarms.ca/ronnie-the-bren-gun-girl/.
- "Shifting Representation: Ronnie the Bren Gun Girl." CanLit Guides. Accessed March 18, 2022. https://canlitguides.ca/canlit-guides-editorial-team/shifting-representation-ronnie-the-bren-gun-girl/.
- "Stamps Honour Bravery on the Battlefield and Support on the Home Front." Canada Post Magazine. Accessed March 18, 2022. https://www.canadapost-postescanada.ca/blogs/personal/perspectives/stamps-honour-bravery-on-the-battlefield-and-support-on-the-home-front/.
- "The Bren Gun Girl." Canada's History. Accessed March 18, 2022. http://www.canadashistory.ca/explore/military-war/the-bren-gun-girl.
- "The Other NFB: Canada's 'Official' Portrait." National Gallery of Canada. Accessed March 18, 2022. https://www.gallery.ca/magazine/your-collection/the-other-nfb-canadas-official-portrait.
- "The Other NFB: The National Film Board of Canada's Still Photography Division, 1941-1971." The RMG. Accessed March 18, 2022. https://rmg.on.ca/exhibitions/the-other-nfb/.
- "The Story of Veronica Foster, Canada's Precursor to Rosie the Riveter." Jazz.FM91. Accessed March 18, 2022. https://jazz.fm/veronica-foster-ronnie-the-bren-gun-girl/.
- "Veronica Foster." The Canadian Encyclopedia. Accessed March 18, 2022. https://www.thecanadianencyclopedia.ca/en/article/veronica-foster.
