= Naomi Parker Fraley =

American war worker (1921–2018)

- Parker in 2017
- Born: Naomi Fern Parker; August 26, 1921; Tulsa, Oklahoma, U.S.
- Died: January 20, 2018 (aged 96); Longview, Washington, U.S.
- Occupations: War worker; waitress
- Spouses: Joseph Blankenship (divorced); John Muhlig (died 1971); Charles Fraley (m. 1979; died 1998)

Naomi Fern Parker Fraley (August 26, 1921 – January 20, 2018) was an American war worker who is considered the most likely model for the iconic "We Can Do It!" poster. During World War II, she worked on aircraft assembly at the Naval Air Station Alameda.

Though Geraldine Hoff Doyle was initially credited as the subject of the iconic poster, a popular photograph of Fraley operating a machine tool at the Naval Air Station is now believed to be the inspiration.

After the war, Fraley worked as a waitress in Palm Springs, California, and married three times. She died aged 96 in 2018.

== Early life ==
1942 photograph of Naomi Parker

Naomi Fern Parker was born in Tulsa, Oklahoma, in 1921. She is the third of eight children to Joseph Parker and Esther Leis. Her father was a mining engineer and her mother was a homemaker. The family moved across the country from New York to California, living in Alameda at the time of the attack on Pearl Harbor. Naomi and her younger sister Ada subsequently went to work at the Naval Air station, where they were assigned to the machine shop for aircraft assembling duties.

== We Can Do It! ==
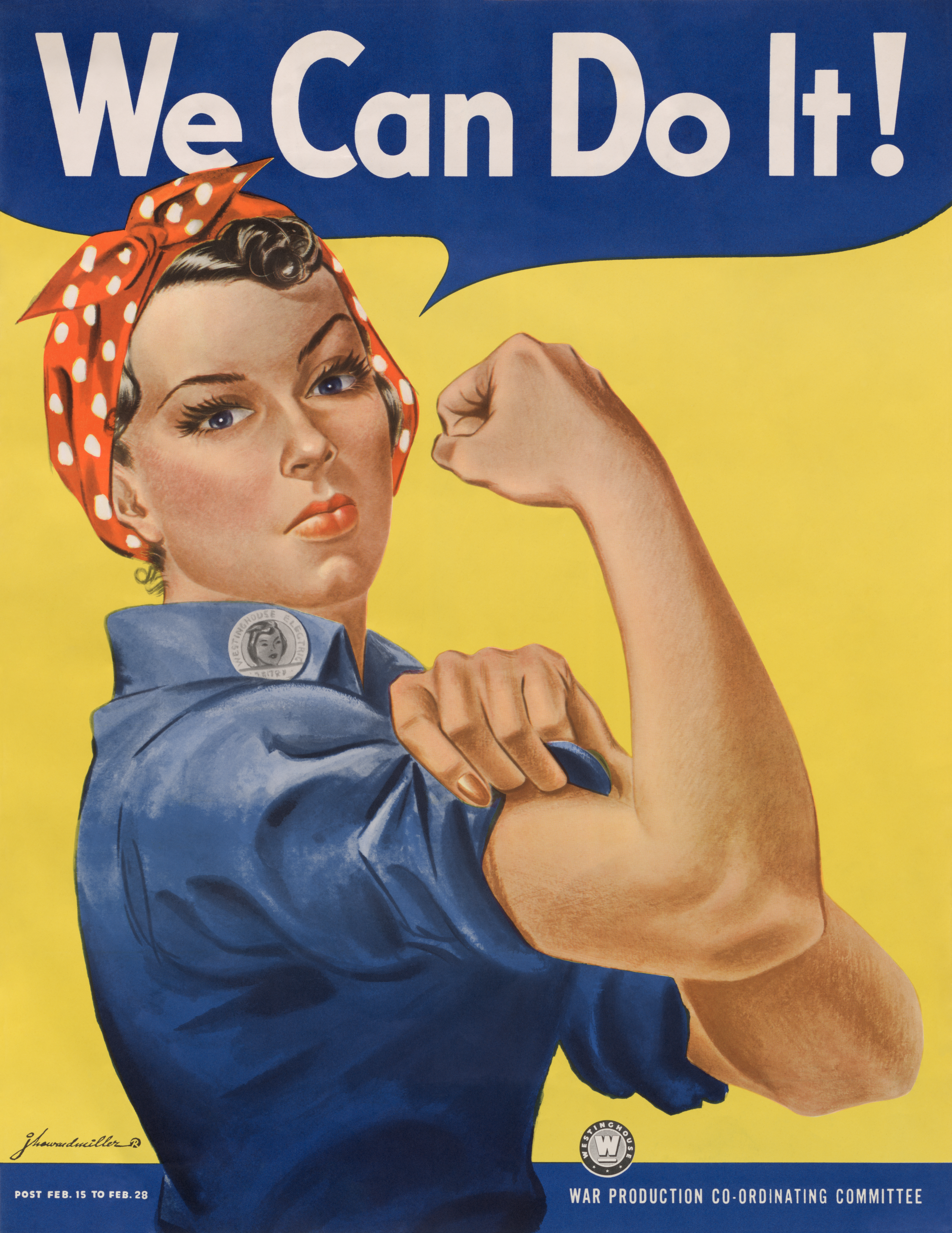
The "We Can Do It!" poster appeared in a few factories in 1943.

In 1942, Parker's photo, taken at a Pratt & Whitney horizontal shaper, appeared in local press on July 5, 1942. The following year, J. Howard Miller's "We Can Do It!" poster was one of a series that appeared in factories at Westinghouse in a worker morale campaign. It is presumed that the newspaper photo was the source of his image.

In 2011, Parker attended a reunion held at the Rosie the Riveter/World War II Home Front National Historical Park and spotted her photograph from 1942. She was surprised to find that the caption credited the model as Geraldine Hoff Doyle, and wrote to the park to correct their mistake. However, her attempts to correct the mistake were ignored.

Seton Hall University professor James J. Kimble become interested in the poster as an icon of the feminist movement. He tracked down the original photo and that it was credited to Naomi Parker in 1942. When he tracked down Parker in 2015 to show her the photo, she still had the original newspaper clipping from 1942. Kimble was certain that Parker was the woman in the photo and considered her to be the strongest candidate behind the inspiration for the poster, but noted that Miller did not leave any writings which could identify his model.

In February 2015, Kimble interviewed the Parker sisters, known as Naomi Fern Fraley (Parker) and Ada Wyn Morford, aged 93 and 91 respectively, and found that they had known for five years about the incorrect identification of the photo, and had been rebuffed in their attempt to correct the historical record.

== Later life ==
After the war, Parker worked as a waitress at The Doll House, a restaurant in Palm Springs, California. She was married three times, first to Joseph Blankenship (divorced), second to John Muhlig (d. 1971), and third to Charles Fraley (d. 1998), whom she married in 1979. In February 2017 she moved to the Longview, Washington area before moving into an assisted care home there later that year.

== Death ==
On January 20, 2018, Parker died in Longview, Washington, at the age of 96. The following month, her life was celebrated on BBC Radio 4's obituary program Last Word.

== See also ==
- American women in World War II
- Pasha Angelina
- Veronica Foster
