= Women in the United States labor force from 1945 to 1950 =

In World War II, many working-age men were drafted into the armed forces to fight abroad. During this time, women were drafted in to take their places in factories and construction. When WWII ended, most men came home; while many were unable or unwilling to return to their old jobs, there was not the same urgency for women to be in the workplace. As such, society had to deal with new attitudes and expectations regarding women’s employment.

Educated women who were married and had children were most impacted by the mobilization during WWII. Women's Labor Force participation post-WWII was correlated with mobilization rates in their respective states and was also due to the rise of the tertiary sector, increase in part-time jobs, adoption of labor-saving household technologies, and education.

== Prior to WWII ==
Before World War II, there was persistent and systematic discrimination against women workers. The women working the labor force prior to the war were usually impoverished and minorities. Women who worked outside their homes prior to World War II, had jobs as receptionists, secretaries, and department store clerks. There was a belief in US society that women of the middle and upper classes should never go into the outside workforce, because it was beneath them. This allowed for the inclusion of legal bars to married women working in many professions.

During the high unemployment of the Great Depression, many thought men should have hiring preference, to allow at least one provider for every family. The U.S. culture encouraged women to gain employment before marriage, but upon marriage they were expected to dedicate themselves to their main duty - maintaining the family home. The important anti-discrimination legislation Equal Pay Act of 1963 would not be passed until 1963. In 1940, 28% of women over the age of 14 participated in the labor force while men over the age of 10 had a 96% workforce participation rate.

== During WWII ==
The war caused the mobilization of 16 million American men. Each states’ contribution of eligible men varied, from 40% of all eligible men being mobilised (Georgia), to 53.6% (Maine). As such the impact on other demographic groups was varied.

=== Numbers and types of jobs ===
By 1945, 37% of women were in employment, encouraged by factors such as war time propaganda or needing more financial income with their husbands either in low-earning military posts, or having been killed or injured in action. The government had created posters and films of women in the workplace in order to persuade American women to serve their country by joining the workforce, taking over for the men while they were away. Virtually 1 in 4 married women were working in the outside workforce by 1945, in jobs such as steel workers, lumber workers, office workers, and construction workers as well as non-combat pilots. Women worked long hours for less pay in dangerous conditions and often experienced sexual harassment on the job.

By 1945 there were 4.7 million women in clerical positions - this was an 89% increase from women with this occupation prior to World War II. In addition, there were 4.5 million women working as factory operatives - this was a 112% increase since before the war. The aviation industry saw the highest increase in female workers during the war. By 1943 there were 310,000 women working in the US aircraft industry, which made up 65% of the industry's total workforce. This was a huge increase since the number of women working in the aircraft industry prior to the war was only 1%.

During the war, 350,000 women worked for the US Armed Forces. By 1945 the Women’s Army Corps had more than 100,000 members and 6,000 female officers who worked more than 200 non-combatant jobs stateside. Women's Airforce Service Pilots were the first female pilots to fly military aircraft. These women transported cargo and assisted with target missions. More than 1,000 women served as Women's Airforce Service Pilots throughout the war; 38 lost their lives.

=== Effective on women and society ===
As a result of higher-paying jobs being filled by women, the number of domestic workers dropped dramatically. It became extremely difficult to get women to fill lower-paying jobs in restaurants and laundromats. During the war, nearly 6 million women joined the workforce.

Additionally, women in the workforce struggled with housework and finding childcare. Many women left their children at home without adult supervision or any form of childcare. Some women left their children at home with their husbands if they had different shifts, or with their older children or relatives. Only 5% of American women had their children in daycare centers towards the beginning of the war. As a result, the government provided funding for childcare and welfare committees so that more women could enter the workforce.

While women's wages rose more relative to men's during this period, real wages did not increase due to higher wartime income taxes. Although jobs that had been previously closed to women opened up, demographics such as African American women who had already been working experienced less change. Their husbands' income effect was historically even more positive than white women's. During the war, African American women's engagement as domestic servants decreased from 59.9% to 44.6%, but Karen Anderson in 1982 characterized their experience as “last hired, first fired.”

== After WWII ==
There has been controversy about the significance of World War II's higher-paying increase of women in the workplace. William Chafe in 1972 called the war a "watershed event" forcing a change in attitudes about women in the workforce. However, women were also employed during World War I, and no such change in attitude occurred after that.

By 1950 the portion of all women in the labor force was down to 32%. However, married women had joined in extraordinary numbers over the previous decade, with most age groups increasing their labor participation by an unprecedented 10 percentage points.

Claudia Goldin used Gladys Palmer's retrospective surveys of women and men's work history from 1940 to 1951 to track changes in weeks worked and labor force participation rate and correlated that with states’ mobilization rates. World War II mobilization had little impact on the long-term labor force participation of women without a high school diploma; however, it did have some positive effect on the long-term participation of more highly educated white women, especially those who were married during the war.

Nevertheless, the bulk of evidence suggests that the influx of women into the workforce during and after the war was primarily due to other longer-term trends. Other important factors at the time that led to general increases in women's participation in the workforce include the rise of the tertiary sector (see table), increases in part-time jobs, adoption of labor-saving household technologies, increased education, and the elimination of "marriage bar" laws and policies. "Marriage bars" forbidding the employment of married women in various government and white-collar positions were especially common during the Depression, but in the early 1940s they were largely eliminated. Part-time jobs gave added flexibility with raising children. Labor-saving devices lowered the time cost of homemaking. Expanding high school and college education better prepared women for employment. There was also a decline in the stigma that a husband's worth was less if the wife worked. The divorce rate was still low in the 1940s and '50s and less important as a factor. Labor force participation was no longer only a transitory phase of a woman's life, as women transitioned to a role of both mothers and workers. Middle-class mothers as well as those from the working class were faced with the double shift of working a job and in the home.

The table below shows a breakdown by sector of jobs held by women in 1940 and 1950. Women overwhelmingly worked in jobs segmented by sex. Women were still highly employed as textile workers and domestic servants, but the clerical and service field greatly expanded. This tertiary sector was more socially acceptable, and many more educated women entered. Wages were low, averaging roughly 60% of men's and there was little room for advancement.

Occupation	1940	1950	Increase	Percentage of Total Increase
Professional, technical	1,608	2,007	399	24.8%
Managers, officials, proprietors	414	700	286	69.1
Clerical	2,700	4,502	1,802	66.7
Sales	925	1,418	493	53.3
Manual	2,720	3,685	965	35.5
Craftswomen, forewomen	135	253	118	87.4
Operatives	2,452	3,287	835	34
Laborers	133	145	12	9
Service Workers	2,699	3,532	833	30.9
Farm Workers	508	601	93	18.3

== See also ==
- United States home front during World War II
- Rosie the Riveter
- Women in the workforce
