= We Can Do It! =

American World War II wartime poster

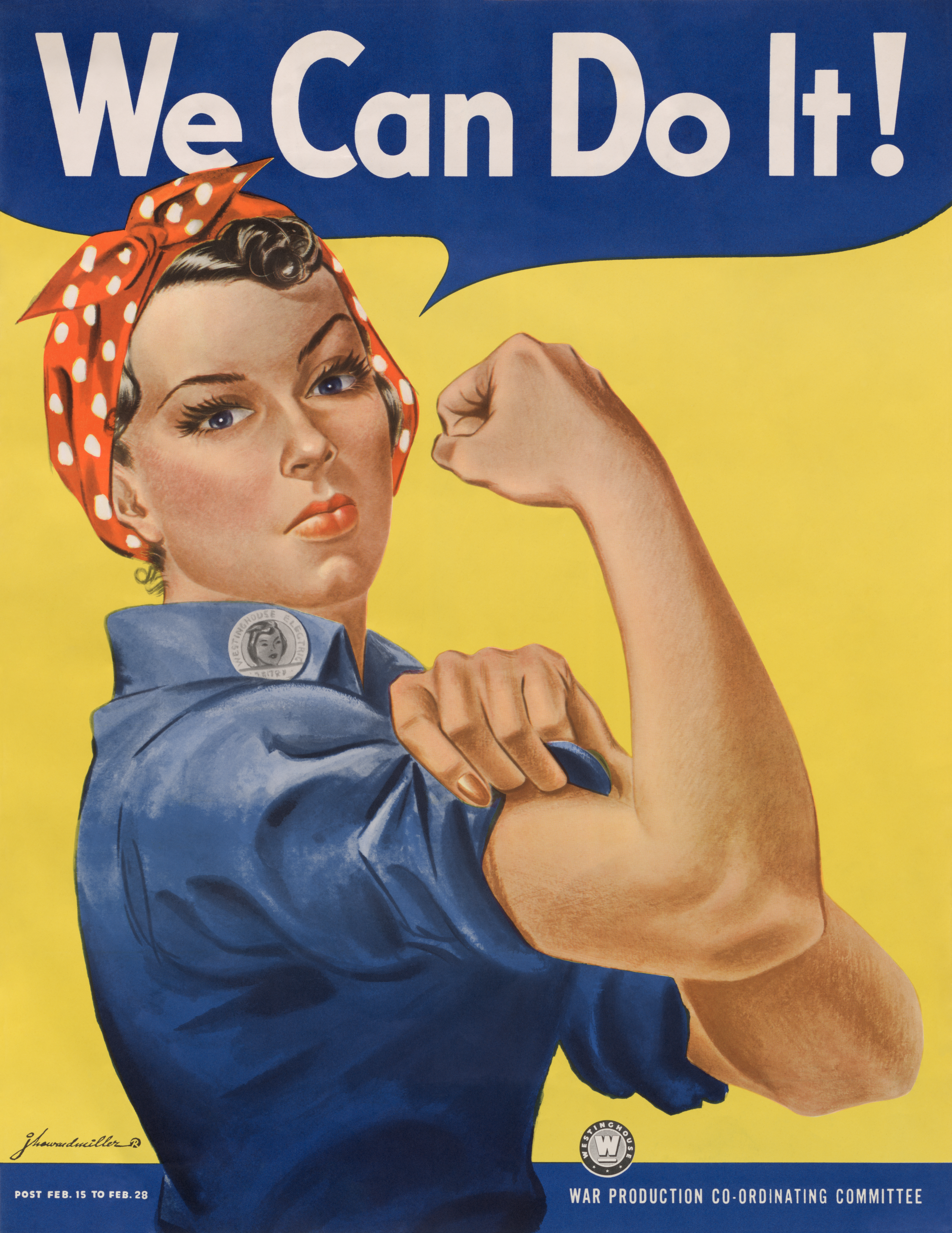
J. Howard Miller's "We Can Do It!" poster from 1943

"We Can Do It!" is an American World War II wartime poster produced by J. Howard Miller in 1943 for Westinghouse Electric as an inspirational image to boost female worker morale.

The poster was little seen during World War II. It was rediscovered in the early 1980s and widely reproduced in many forms, often mistakenly called "Rosie the Riveter", which is a different depiction of a female war production worker. The "We Can Do It!" image was used to promote feminism and other political issues beginning in the 1980s. The image made the cover of the Smithsonian magazine in 1994 and was fashioned into a US first-class mail stamp in 1999. It was incorporated in 2008 into campaign materials for several American politicians, and was reworked by an artist in 2010 to celebrate the first woman becoming prime minister of Australia. The poster is one of the ten most-requested images at the National Archives and Records Administration.

After its rediscovery, observers often assumed that the image was always used as a call to inspire women workers to join the military war effort. However, during the war the image was strictly internal to Westinghouse, displayed only during February 1943, and was not for recruitment but to exhort already-hired women to work harder. People have seized upon the uplifting attitude and apparent message to remake the image into many different forms, including self-empowerment, campaign promotion, advertising, and parodies.

After she saw the Smithsonian cover image in 1994, Geraldine Hoff Doyle mistakenly said that she was the subject of the poster. Doyle thought that she had also been captured in a wartime photograph of a woman factory worker, and she assumed that this photo inspired Miller's poster. Conflating her as "Rosie the Riveter", Doyle was honored by many organizations including the Michigan Women's Historical Center and Hall of Fame. However, in 2015, the woman in the wartime photograph was identified as then 20-year-old Naomi Parker, working in early 1942 before Doyle had graduated from high school. Doyle's notion that the photograph inspired the poster cannot be proved or disproved, so neither Doyle nor Parker can be confirmed as the model for "We Can Do It!".

== Background ==
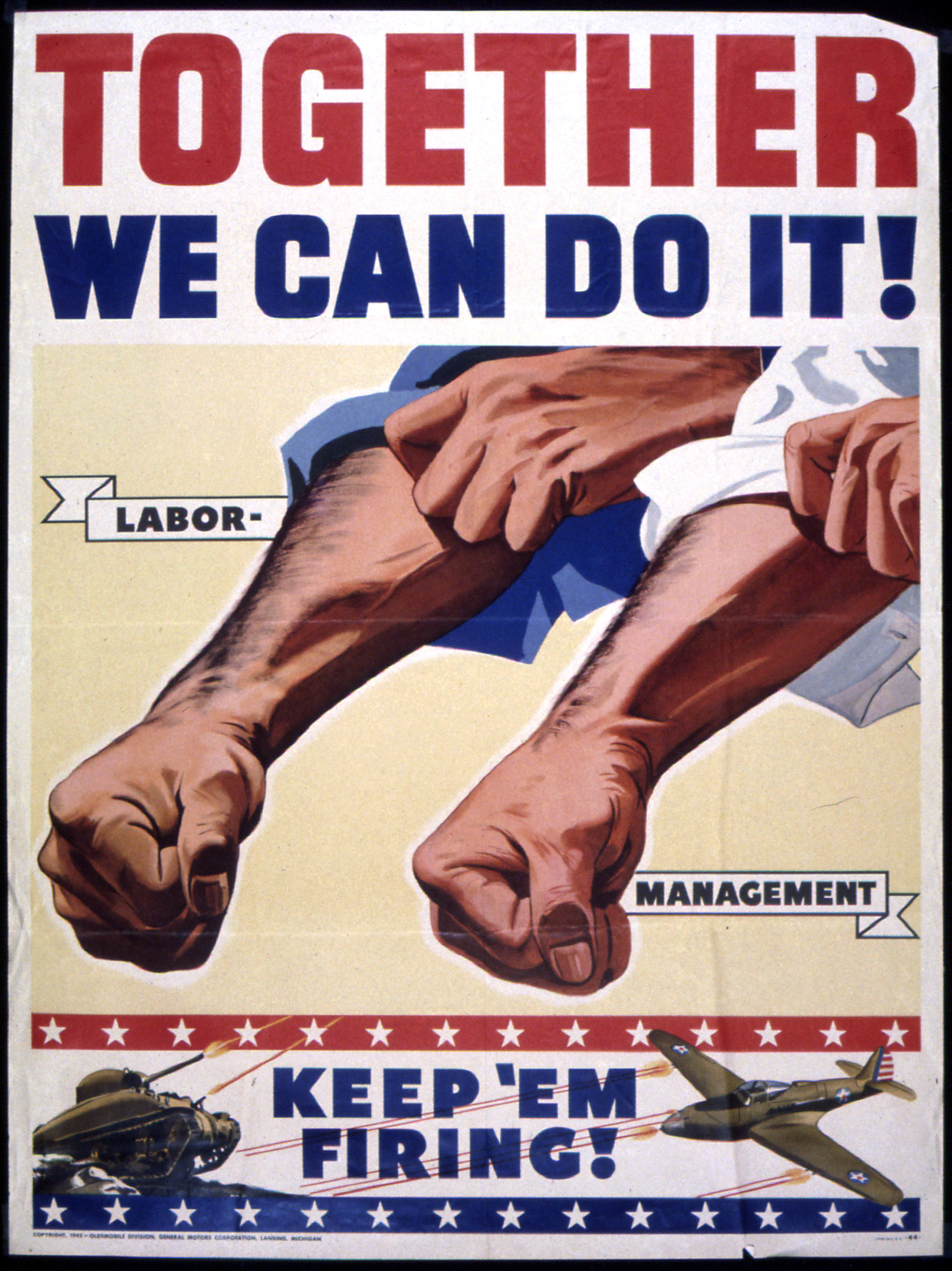
A propaganda poster from 1942 encouraging unity between labor and management of GM

After the Japanese attack on Pearl Harbor, the U.S. government called upon manufacturers to produce greater amounts of war goods. The workplace atmosphere at large factories was often tense because of resentment built up between management and labor unions throughout the 1930s. Directors of companies such as General Motors (GM) sought to minimize past friction and encourage teamwork. In response to a rumored public relations campaign by the United Auto Workers union, GM quickly produced a propaganda poster in 1942 showing both labor and management rolling up their sleeves, aligned toward maintaining a steady rate of war production. The poster read, "Together We Can Do It!" and "Keep 'Em Firing!" In creating such posters, corporations wished to increase production by tapping popular pro-war sentiment, with the ultimate goal of preventing the government from exerting greater control over production.

=== J. Howard Miller ===
J. Howard Miller was the American graphic artist who painted the famous "We Can Do It!" poster. He painted posters during World War II in support of the war effort. Aside from the iconic poster, Miller's work remains largely unknown. For many years, little had been written about Miller's life, with uncertainty extending to his birth and death dates. In 2022, Professor James J. Kimble uncovered more of Miller's personal information, setting the birth year in 1898, and the death in 1985. Miller was married to Mabel Adair McCauley. Their marriage was childless; surviving family members are related through Miller's siblings.

Miller studied at the Art Institute of Pittsburgh, graduating in 1939. He lived in Pittsburgh during the war. His work came to the attention of the Westinghouse Company (later, the Westinghouse War Production Co-Ordinating Committee), and he was hired to create a series of posters. The posters were sponsored by the company's internal War Production Co-Ordinating Committee, one of the hundreds of labor-management committees organized under the supervision of the national War Production Board. Aside from his commercial work, Miller painted landscapes and studies in oil; Miller's family kept all of his works in their homes.

=== Westinghouse Electric ===
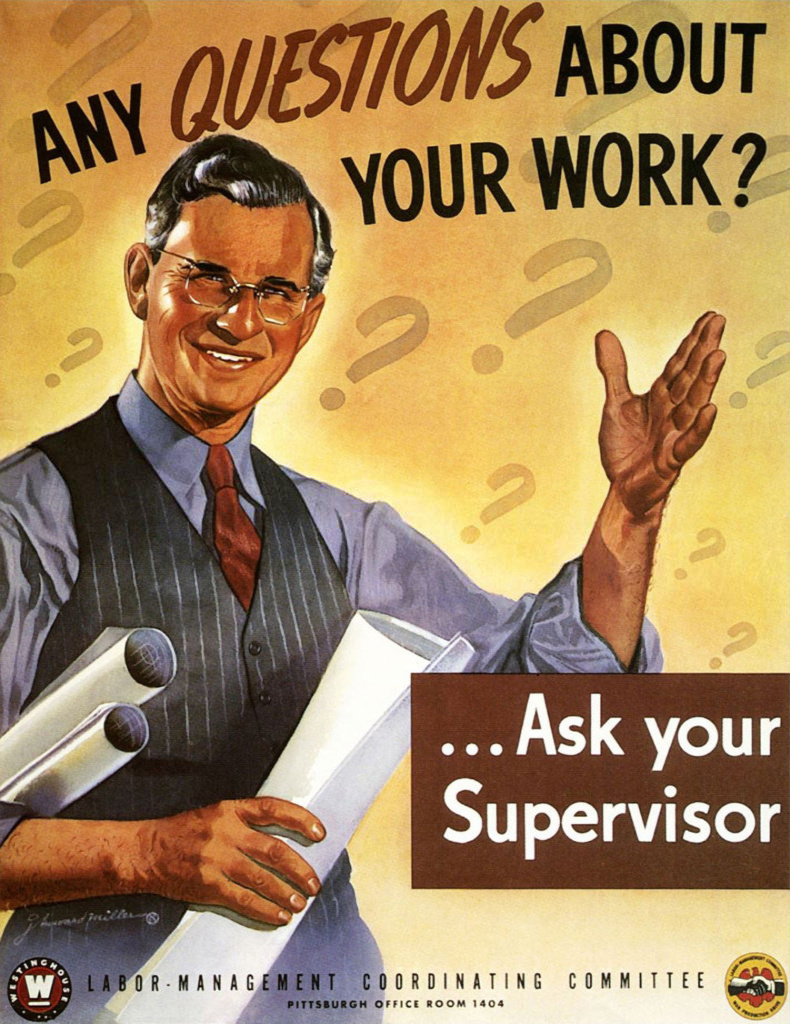
Another poster by J. Howard Miller from the same series as "We Can Do It!"

In 1942, Miller was hired by Westinghouse Electric's internal War Production Coordinating Committee, through an advertising agency, to create a series of posters to display to the company's workers. The intent of the poster project was to raise worker morale, to reduce absenteeism, to direct workers' questions to management, and to lower the likelihood of labor unrest or a factory strike. Each of the more than 42 posters designed by Miller was displayed in the factory for two weeks, then replaced by the next one in the series. Most of the posters featured men; they emphasized traditional roles for men and women. One poster depicted a smiling male manager with the words "Any Questions About Your Work? ... Ask your Supervisor."

No more than 1,800 copies of the 17-by-22-inch (559 by 432 mm) "We Can Do It!" poster were printed. It was not initially seen beyond several Westinghouse factories in East Pittsburgh, Pennsylvania, and the midwestern U.S., where it was scheduled to be displayed for two five-day work weeks starting Monday, February 15, 1943. The targeted factories were making plasticized helmet liners impregnated with Micarta, a phenolic resin invented by Westinghouse. Mostly women were employed in this enterprise, which yielded some 13 million helmet liners over the course of the war. The slogan "We Can Do It!" was probably not interpreted by the factory workers as empowering to women alone; they had been subjected to a series of paternalistic, controlling posters promoting management authority, employee capability and company unity, and the workers would likely have understood the image to mean "Westinghouse Employees Can Do It", all working together. The upbeat image served as gentle propaganda to boost employee morale and keep production from lagging. The badge on the "We Can Do It!" worker's collar identifies her as a Westinghouse Electric plant floor employee; the pictured red, white and blue clothing was a subtle call to patriotism, one of the frequent tactics of corporate war production committees.

== Rosie the Riveter ==
During World War II, the "We Can Do It!" poster was not connected to the 1942 song "Rosie the Riveter", nor to the widely seen Norman Rockwell painting called Rosie the Riveter that appeared on the cover of the Memorial Day issue of the Saturday Evening Post, May 29, 1943. The Westinghouse poster was not associated with any of the women nicknamed "Rosie" who came forward to promote women working for war production on the home front. Rather, after being displayed for two weeks in February 1943 to some Westinghouse factory workers, it disappeared for nearly four decades. Other "Rosie" images prevailed, often photographs of actual workers. The Office of War Information geared up for a massive nationwide advertising campaign to sell the war, but "We Can Do It!" was not part of it.

Rockwell's emblematic Rosie the Riveter painting was loaned by the Post to the U.S. Treasury Department for use in posters and campaigns promoting war bonds. Following the war, the Rockwell painting gradually sank from public memory because it was copyrighted; all of Rockwell's paintings were vigorously defended by his estate after his death. This protection resulted in the original painting gaining value—it sold for nearly $5 million in 2002. Conversely, the lack of protection for the "We Can Do It!" image is one of the reasons it experienced a rebirth.

Ed Reis, a volunteer historian for Westinghouse, noted that the original image was not shown to female riveters during the war, so the recent association with "Rosie the Riveter" was unjustified. Rather, it was targeted at women who were making helmet liners out of Micarta. Reis joked that the woman in the image was more likely to have been named "Molly the Micarta Molder or Helen the Helmet Liner Maker."

== Rediscovery ==
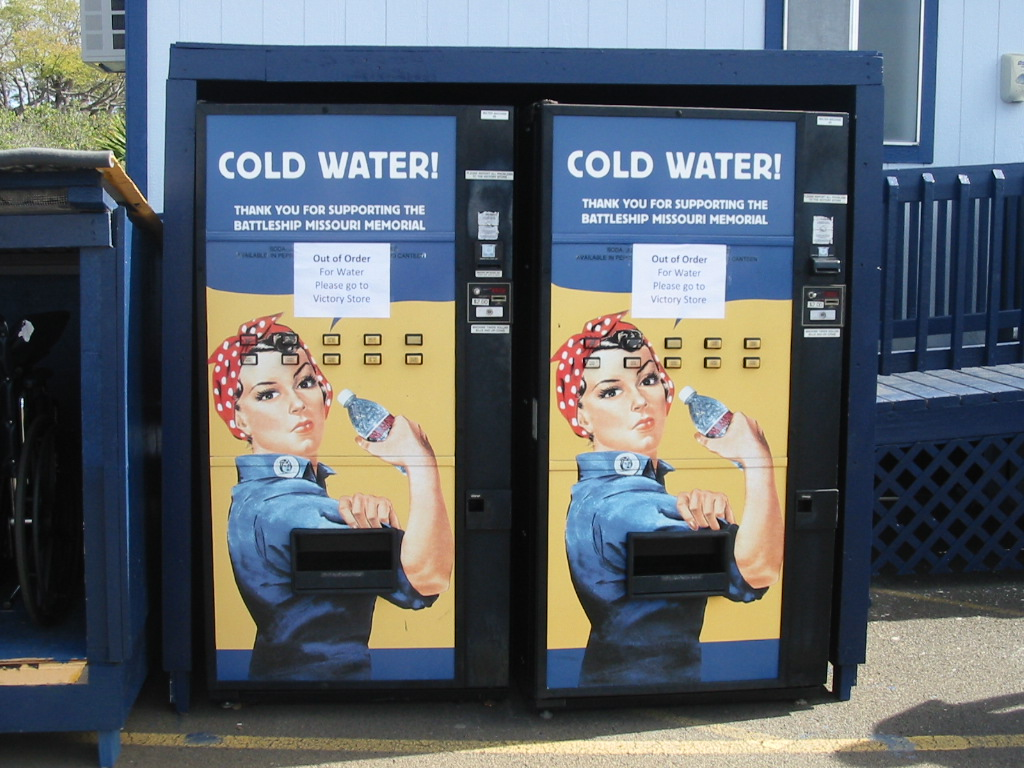
An example of commercial use on a pair of vending machines for bottled water at a WWII Battleship Museum

In 1982, the "We Can Do It!" poster was reproduced in a magazine article, "Poster Art for Patriotism's Sake", a Washington Post Magazine article about posters in the collection of the National Archives.

In subsequent years, the poster was re-appropriated to promote feminism. Feminists saw in the image an embodiment of female empowerment. The "We" was understood to mean "We Women", uniting all women in a sisterhood fighting against gender inequality. This was very different from the poster's 1943 use to control employees and to discourage labor unrest. History professor Jeremiah Axelrod commented on the image's combination of femininity with the "masculine (almost macho) composition and body language."

Smithsonian magazine put the image on its cover in March 1994, to invite the viewer to read a featured article about wartime posters. The US Postal Service created a 33¢ stamp in February 1999 based on the image, with the added words "Women Support War Effort". A Westinghouse poster from 1943 was put on display at the National Museum of American History, part of the exhibit showing items from the 1930s and '40s.

== Wire service photograph ==
1942 photograph of Naomi Parker

In 1984, former war worker Geraldine Hoff Doyle came across an article in Modern Maturity magazine which showed a wartime photograph of a young woman working at a lathe, and she assumed that the photograph was taken of her in mid-to-late 1942 when she was working briefly in a factory. Ten years later, Doyle saw the "We Can Do It!" poster on the front of the Smithsonian magazine and assumed the poster was an image of herself. Without intending to profit from the connection, Doyle decided that the 1942 wartime photograph had inspired Miller to create the poster, making Doyle herself the model for the poster. Subsequently, Doyle was widely credited as the inspiration for Miller's poster. From an archive of Acme news photographs, Professor James J. Kimble obtained the original photographic print, including its yellowed caption identifying the woman as Naomi Parker. The photo is one of a series of photographs taken at Naval Air Station Alameda in California, showing Parker and her sister working at their war jobs during March 1942. These images were published in various newspapers and magazines beginning in April 1942, during a time when Doyle was still attending high school in Michigan. In February 2015, Kimble interviewed the Parker sisters: Naomi Fern Fraley, 93, and her sister Ada Wyn Morford, 91; he found that they had known for five years about the incorrect identification of the photo, and had been rebuffed in their attempt to correct the historical record. Naomi died at age 96 on January 20, 2018.

Although many publications have repeated Doyle's unsupported assertion that the wartime photograph inspired Miller's poster, Westinghouse historian Charles A. Ruch, a Pittsburgh resident who had been friends with J. Howard Miller, said that Miller was not in the habit of working from photographs, but rather live models. However, the photograph of Naomi Parker did appear in The Pittsburgh Press on July 5, 1942, making it possible that Miller saw it as he was creating the poster.

== Legacy ==
The "We Can Do It!" poster was used by the Ad Council for its 70th anniversary celebration, through a Facebook app called "Rosify Yourself".

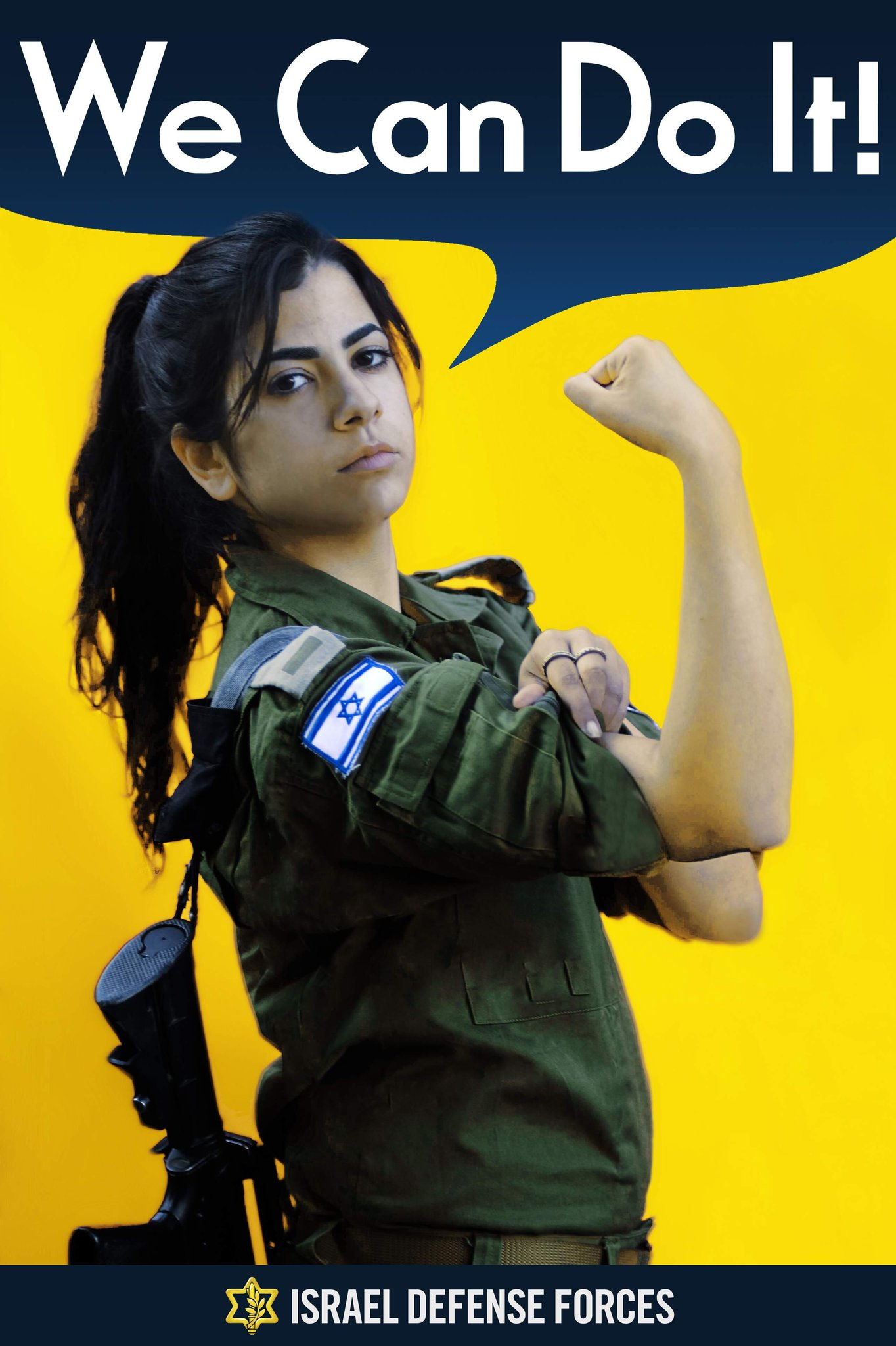
A 2013 military propaganda poster of the Israel Defense Forces based on the "We Can Do It!" poster

Today, the image has become very widely known, far beyond its narrowly defined purpose during World War II. It has adorned T-shirts, tattoos, coffee cups and refrigerator magnets—so many different products that The Washington Post called it the "most over-exposed" souvenir item available in Washington, D.C. It was used in 2008 by some of the various regional campaigners working to elect Sarah Palin, Ron Paul and Hillary Clinton. Michelle Obama was worked into the image by some attendees of the 2010 Rally to Restore Sanity and/or Fear. The image has been employed by corporations such as Clorox who used it in advertisements for household cleaners, the pictured woman provided in this instance with a wedding ring on her left hand. Parodies of the image have included famous women, men, animals and fictional characters. A bobblehead doll and an action figure toy have been produced. The Children's Museum of Indianapolis showed a four-by-five-foot (1.2 by 1.5 m) replica made by artist Kristen Cumings from thousands of Jelly Belly candies.

After Julia Gillard became the first female prime minister of Australia in June 2010, a street artist in Melbourne calling himself Phoenix pasted Gillard's face into a new monochrome version of the "We Can Do It!" poster. AnOther Magazine published a photograph of the poster taken on Hosier Lane, Melbourne, in July 2010, showing that the original "War Production Co-ordinating Committee" mark in the lower right had been replaced with a URL pointing to Phoenix's Flickr photostream. In March 2011, Phoenix produced a color version which stated "She Did It!" in the lower right, then in January 2012 he pasted "Too Sad" diagonally across the poster to represent his disappointment with developments in Australian politics.

Geraldine Doyle died in December 2010. Utne Reader went ahead with their scheduled January–February 2011 cover image: a parody of "We Can Do It!" featuring Marge Simpson raising her right hand in a fist. The editors of the magazine expressed regret at the passing of Doyle.

A stereoscopic image of "We Can Do It!" was created for the closing credits of the 2011 superhero film Captain America: The First Avenger. The image served as the background for the title card of English actress Hayley Atwell. In the chronologically-later 2025 film Thunderbolts*, the character of Yelena Belova portrayed by Florence Pugh is depicted in the same pose for Pugh's title card.

The Ad Council claimed the poster was developed in 1942 by its precursor, the War Advertising Committee, as part of a "Women in War Jobs" campaign, helping to bring "over two million women" into war production. In February 2012 during the Ad Council's 70th anniversary celebration, an interactive application designed by Animax's HelpsGood digital agency was linked to the Ad Council's Facebook page. The Facebook app was called "Rosify Yourself", referring to Rosie the Riveter; it allowed viewers to upload images of their faces to be incorporated into the "We Can Do It!" poster, then saved to be shared with friends. Ad Council President and CEO Peggy Conlon posted her own "Rosified" face on Huffington Post in an article she wrote about the group's 70-year history. The staff of the television show Today posted two "Rosified" images on their website, using the faces of news anchors Matt Lauer and Ann Curry. However, Seton Hall University professor James J. Kimble and University of Pittsburgh professor Lester C. Olson researched the origins of the poster and determined that it was not produced by the Ad Council nor was it used for recruiting women workers.

In 2010, American singer Pink recreated the poster in the music video for her song "Raise Your Glass".

The poster continues to inspire artists such as Kate Bergen. She has painted images of COVID-19 medical workers in a similar style, initially to cope with the stress of her work but also to encourage others and support front line workers.

== See also ==
- American propaganda during World War II
- Bras d'honneur
- Keep Calm and Carry On, another WWII poster that became famous only decades later
