= John William Horsley =

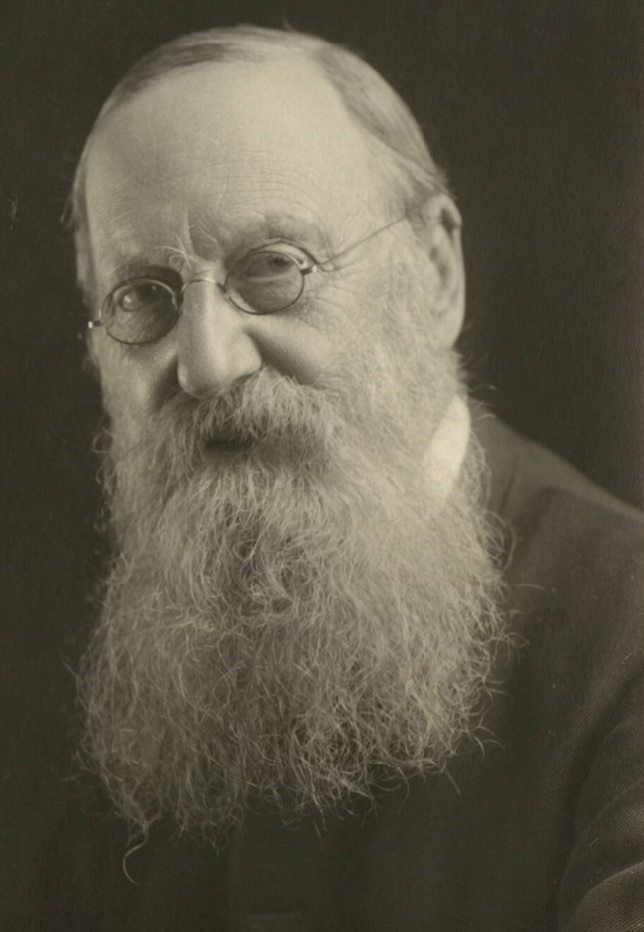
Horsley by Elliott & Fry at an unknown date (NPG x89823).

John William Horsley (14 June 1845 - 25 November 1921) was a Church of England priest, campaigner and philanthropist. He was also granted honorary canonries of Rochester Cathedral (1903) and Southwark Cathedral (1905).

He was a totally abstained from alcohol and was active on the Church of England Temperance Society's council, along with serving as the National Anti-Gambling League's vice-president. In his spare time he was a mountain-climber, botanist, zoologist and mollusc-expert.

== Life ==
He was born in Dunkirk, Kent to that parish's first incumbent, the Rev. John William Horsley, and his wife Susannah Sankey, daughter of Dr William Sankey. Attending King's School, Canterbury and Pembroke College Oxford, he was ordained priest by John Mackarness, Bishop of Oxford at Cuddesdon parish church on 22 September 1872 and spent curacies in Witney and St Michael Shoreditch.

On Shoreditch he began his work to alleviate poverty and improve conditions for prisoners. His next post was as Clerkenwell Prison's chaplain (1876–1886), only leaving the post when that prison was demolished, then becoming secretary to the Waifs and Strays Society (1886–1889). He also married Mary Sophia (1855–1890), daughter of that prison's governor Captain Rowland Bentinck Codd (1824–1880) in 1877.

In 1889 he became Vicar of Holy Trinity Woolwich, remaining there until 1894, when he was made Vicar of St Peter's Walworth in south London (1891–1911). Whilst in Walworth he emptied the church's crypt to provide a play-area for local children. He was also chairman of the Metropolitan Borough of Southwark's public health committee and of its largest workhouse.

He became a member of the Quatuor Coronati Lodge of freemasons in 1891 and its master in 1905. He was also chaplain for many years to the Saye and Sele Lodge, and in 1906 was appointed grand chaplain of the United Grand Lodge of England. He was elected mayor of Southwark in 1910 before finally serving as Vicar of St Martin of Tours Church, Detling (1911–1921). He died in Kingsdown and was granted his dying wish of being buried in Detling in the same grave as his daughter (killed there by a lorry whilst working as a milkwoman during the First World War).

== Works ==
- Practical Hints for Parochial Missions (1877, with Nathaniel Dawes (Note: The following year Dawes married another daughter of Rowland Bentinck Codd.))
- Jottings from Jail: Notes and Papers On Prison Matters (1887)
- What Doctors say about Alcohol (1891)
- Prisons and Prisoners (1898)
- Sporting Prophets. A letter on the betting mania. (1902)
- The return to the Father : seven sermons on a part of the parable of the prodigal son (1904, in collaboration with the Rev Thomas Hancock)
- Introduction to Masonic Jurisprudence and Symbolism as interpreted by Grand Lodge Decisions by John Thomas Lawrence (1908)
- "I Remember" : Memoirs of A "Sky Pilot" in the Prison and the Slum (1911)
- How Criminals are Made and Prevented: a retrospect of forty years (1912)
- A Commentary on the Litany (1915)
- Our British Snails (1915)
- Place Names in Kent (1921)
