= Thomas Hancock (priest) =

Church of England priest (1832–1903)

Thomas Hancock (19 July 1832 - 24 September 1903) was a Church of England priest, journalist and historian of the mid-17th century. He was also a leading activist in the Christian Socialist movement, and a major member of the Guild of St Matthew.

== Life ==
He was schooled at Merchant Taylors' School. He wrote The Peculium for Joseph Rowntree's prize competition and it was noticed by one of the prize judges Frederick Denison Maurice, who suggested he seek ordained ministry. He was ordained in 1863 by Samuel Wilberforce, followed by a series of curacies in Buckinghamshire, Leicester, Holy Trinity Westminster and Lewisham.

These lasted until 1875, when he was given a Society for the Propagation of the Gospel chaplaincy in Seelisberg, Champfèr and Axenstein for five years. In 1883 Henry Cary Shuttleworth made him lecturer of St Nicholas Cole Abbey in the City of London, a post he held until his death.

As a journalist he was a contributor to the Saturday Review, Church Times, Athenaeum, Weekly Times and the journal of the Church Historical Society among others and wrote special leader pieces for the Echo during the Russo-Turkish War. He died in Harrow-on-the-Hill (whither he had moved in 1879), leaving a widow (daughter of John Farmer), a son and two daughters.

== Selected works ==
=== Sermons ===
- A Bishop must have the good report of those who are without the Church. A sermon [on 1 Tim. iii. 7] preached on the Sunday after the confirmation of Dr. Temple ..., 1869
- The Resurrection of Jesus Christ the hope of mankind. A sermon [on 1 Pet. i. 3], etc., 1869
- The Return to the Father. Sermons on a part of the parable of the Prodigal Son, etc., 1873
- Christ and the people : sermons, chiefly on the obligations of the Church to the State and to humanity, 1882
- Salvation by Mammon. Two sermons [on John vi. 7, and Phil. iii. 19, 20 respectively] on Mr. Booth's scheme [as set forth in his book “In Darkest England”] ... Reprinted from the “Church Reformer”, Dec., 1890 & Jan. 1891
- The return to the Father : seven sermons on a part of the parable of the prodigal son., 1904 (with John William Horsley)
- The pulpit and the press : and other sermons ; most of which were preached at S. Nicholas Cole Abbey, 1904

=== History ===
- The Peculium; an Endeavour to Throw Light on Some of the Causes of the Decline of the Society of Friends, Especially in Regard to Its Original Claim of Being the Peculiar People of God, 1859e
- The act of uniformity : a measure of liberation, 1898
- The Puritans and the Tithes., 1905
