= Echo (newspaper) =

Echo or The Echo may refer to the following newspapers:

- The Echo (Cork), formerly the Evening Echo, founded in 1892 in Cork, Ireland
- The Echo (Dublin), formerly the Tallaght Echo based in Dublin, Ireland
- The Echo (London), a London newspaper published 1868–1905
- The Echo (Essex), an evening newspaper which serves South Essex
- L'Echo, a French-language financial newspaper published in Belgium
- L'Écho de Paris, a daily newspaper in Paris from 1884 to 1944
- The Blue Mountain Echo, published from 1909 to 1928 in Katoomba, New South Wales, Australia
- Byron Shire Echo, based in Byron Bay, New South Wales, Australia
- Cavan Echo, based in Cavan Town, County Cavan, Ireland
- Dorset Echo, serving the county of Dorset, England
- Enniscorthy Echo, based in Enniscorthy, County Wexford, Ireland
- Gloucestershire Echo, based in Cheltenham, England
- Kimberley Echo, a community newspaper based in Kununurra, Kimberley, Western Australia
- Lincolnshire Echo, based in Lincolnshire, England
- Liverpool Echo, based in Liverpool, England
- Loughborough Echo, based in Loughborough, Leicestershire, England
- Mayo Echo, a controversial free, weekly tabloid newspaper circulated in County Mayo, Ireland, during the 2000s
- The Northern Echo, based in Darlington, England
- The Sofia Echo, Bulgaria's national English-language newspaper
- South Wales Echo, based in Cardiff, Wales
- Echo Weekly, an alternative weekly newspaper based in Kitchener, Ontario
- Bournemouth Daily Echo, based in Bournemouth, England
- The Irish Echo, based in New York City
- Southern Daily Echo, based in Hampshire, England
- Echo (Azerbaijani newspaper)

== See also ==
- Express & Echo, serving Exeter, England, and the surrounding area
