= Henry Cary Shuttleworth =

Henry Cary Shuttleworth (20 October 1850 - 24 October 1900) was a Church of England priest, theologian and hymn writer, two of them being 'Father, ere yet another day is ended' and 'Father of men, in Whom are one.'. He also lectured in church history and pastoral and liturgical theology at King's College London.

== Life ==
He was born in the vicarage at Egloshayle in Cornwall to the Rev. Edward Shuttleworth, a Canon of Truro Cathedral and Mary Elizabeth Symons Fuller (1856 - 1922). He studied at St Mary's Hall in Oxford, graduating BA in 1873, the same year as he was ordained deacon by John Mackarness, Bishop of Oxford.

He was priested in 1874 and his first posts were as curate at St Barnabas Church, Oxford and chaplain to Christ Church Oxford, before in 1876 he became a Minor Canon of St Paul's Cathedral. He was appointed Rector of St Nicholas Cole Abbey in the City of London in 1883 and the same year made Thomas Hancock lecturer of that parish.

== Works ==
- The Last Words of the Saviour. Addresses delivered at St. Barnabas, Oxford, etc., 1875
- The Last Words of Our Saviour. Addresses delivered in St. Paul's Cathedral on Good Friday, 1878, 1879
- Our Vicar's Stories, 1883
- Songs, 1885
- Social Repentance. A sermon on Luke xix. 42., 1888
- The Place of Music in Public Worship, 1892
- The Christian Church and the Problem of Poverty, 1894
- Hymns for Private Use, 1896
- Addresses to Lads ..., 1897 and 1907
- “Be Ye Good Bankers", 1899
- The Two Crowns, and other stories, 1904
- Poems and hymns, 1907 (with Edward H A Koch and Henry Scott Holland)

=== Editor ===
- The Diary of an Actress, or, Realities of stage life., 1885
- Some Aspects of Disestablishment. Essays by Clergymen of the Church of England., 1894

=== Other ===
- Supplemental Hymns. For use in the Church of St. Nicholas Cole-Abbey, preface by H C Shuttleworth, 1890
- Hymns for Private Use, brought together by H. C. Shuttleworth., 1895
- St. Nicholas Cole-Abbey. Hymnal appendix: compiled by H. C. Shuttleworth, 1897

== Bibliography ==
- Henry Cary Shuttleworth. A memoir. Edited by G. W. E. Russell, 1903
