= Kent County Show =

Coordinates: 51°18′6″N 0°34′54″E

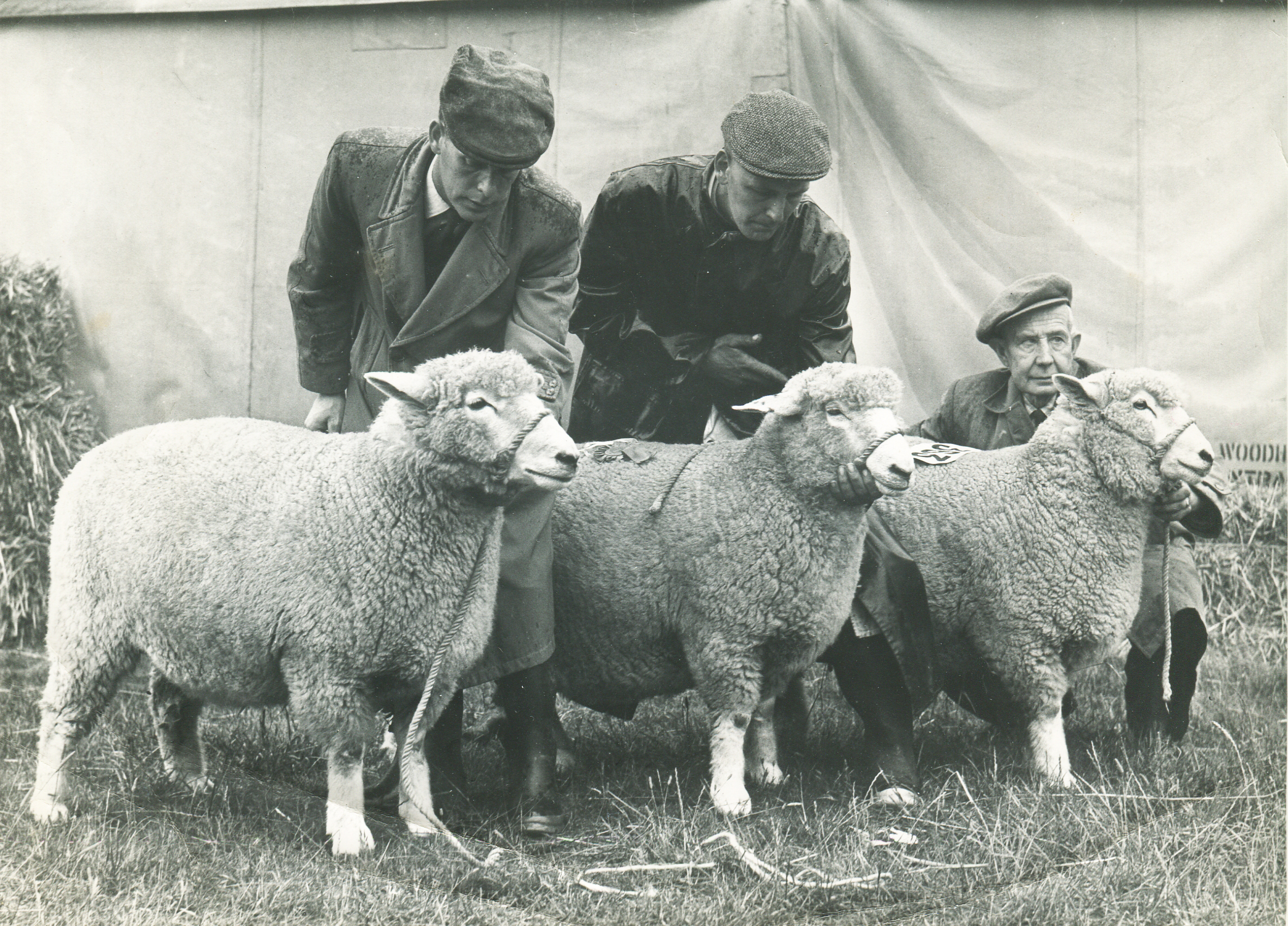
- 1954 Kent County Show
- Type: Agricultural Show
- Established: 19 June 1923
- Location: Kent Showground
- Website: https://kcas.org.uk/

The Kent County Show is an event hosted annually by the Kent County Agricultural Society at their Kent Showground headquarters at Detling near Maidstone in Kent, England. The event is primarily an agricultural show, showcasing the produce of Kent farmers such as soft fruit, alongside a livestock show and various other attractions such as demonstrations of traditional skills like blacksmithery and displays from the Royal Artillery.

First held from 19 to 21 June 1923, the Show remains a shop window for rural Kent life, attracting around 80,000 visitors each year.

== History ==
The Kent County Agricultural Society was formed in 1923 with the amalgamation of the Mid Kent and East Kent Show Societies. The Society’s primary objective was to host an annual agricultural show.

This led to the very first 'Kent County Agricultural Show' being held that year at Wombwell Park in Gravesend. The Show was declared by Gravesend's mayor of the time as "the greatest advertisement the town had been privileged to enjoy."

The official programme listed details of a band and smoking concerts with a sports gala and carnival as a Saturday night grand finale. There were 833 livestock, entries and 15,000 people turned out to watch the prize cattle, sheep, pigs, and horses take the rosettes.

The first county show turned out not to be profitable, and the Society relocated the event to Ashford in 1924. This year marked the first royal attendee when Prince Henry visited to peruse the livestock. This time, the event turned a profit.

In 1927, the county show moved on to Knole Park in Sevenoaks. Up to the outbreak of the Second World War in 1939, a three-day Show was held in various parts of the County. In the years immediately preceding WWII it was held at Canterbury before then moving to Mote Park in Maidstone. From 1939 to 1945 it was cancelled as Kent farmers agreed that they needed to focus their energies on producing food for the nation.

After the war, the event was restarted. From 1947–1963 two-day shows were held at Mote Park. In 1949 Winston Churchill arrived personally in Maidstone to collect his rosette and cup for breeding the first prize winner in a 'cow in calf' category at his farm in Westerham.

A permanent site, now known as the Kent Showground, was acquired in Detling in time for the 1964 Show. The Kent County Show has been held annually there ever since.

Other royal visitors have since followed in Prince Henry's footsteps. In 1973 Princess Anne paid a visit. At the 50th anniversary of the show in 1979, another Duke of Gloucester, Prince Richard, cut the ribbon and for the diamond anniversary, the Queen herself saw the agricultural pride of Kent with the Duke of Edinburgh in 1989.

In 2004, the Duke of Kent enjoyed the newly built Kent pavilion to celebrate the 75th anniversary. The 2009 show saw Prince Edward and the Countess of Wessex visit to salute the 80th holding of the show.

In 2012, over 25,000 visitors were expected each day, but for the first time since 1964, the show was closed by bad weather - mainly severe rain over the preceding weeks. The first day of the show was closed due to the difficulty in getting vehicles into the car parks, after 8,000 visitors had been admitted. A similar situation allowed only 9,000 on the second day, despite over 400 tonnes of bark chippings being used to try to keep roads and entrances open. The third day, Sunday 15 July, was open only to those with pre-booked tickets.

The Kent County Show 2013 took place from 12-14 July 2013. New areas including a Canine Area hosted by the Kennel Club and a Country and Game Area hosted by the CLA were introduced. The Show enjoyed excellent weather, but many stands were missing after the poor weather of the previous year.

In July 2015 the show was featured on the BBC One programme Countryfile.

In 2019, the Society celebrated the 90th Kent County Show, with a visit from their Patron, HRH the Duke of Kent, KG on Friday 5 July, taking particular interest in the heritage vehicle display, Kent farriers, livestock and the young farmers who compete across all three days. He also planted a tree in the Woodland Area to commemorate the 90th Show.

== The Charity Behind the Show ==
Throughout its history, the Kent County Agricultural Society's mission has been embedded in the endorsement of agriculture, improvement in the breeding and rearing of livestock and encouragement of the invention and development of agricultural implements and machinery. In 1990 the Society made an application to The Charity Commission, and on 17 December that year the Kent County Agricultural Society was officially registered as a charity.

100 years on from its establishment, the Society's core ambitions remain the same. It now holds six events annually, the Kent Farming Conference, Farm Expo, Heritage Transport Show, Living Land, Biddenden Tractorfest, and its flagship event, the Kent County Show.

In 2015 the Society established the Kent Rural Scholarship Scheme, supporting up to 3 new students a year studying a farming or land-based degree. In the 7 years of running the scheme, the Society has sponsored 20 scholars, totally a donation of £60,000 in scholarship funds. The Society has also donated between £9,000 and £20,000 a year in grants to Kent Young Farmers Clubs, providing essential funding for services and materials necessary to the running of the clubs.

In 2023, the Society celebrated its 100 year anniversary.
