= RAF Detling =

Former Royal Air Force station in Kent, England

RAF Detling
- Near Detling, Kent in England
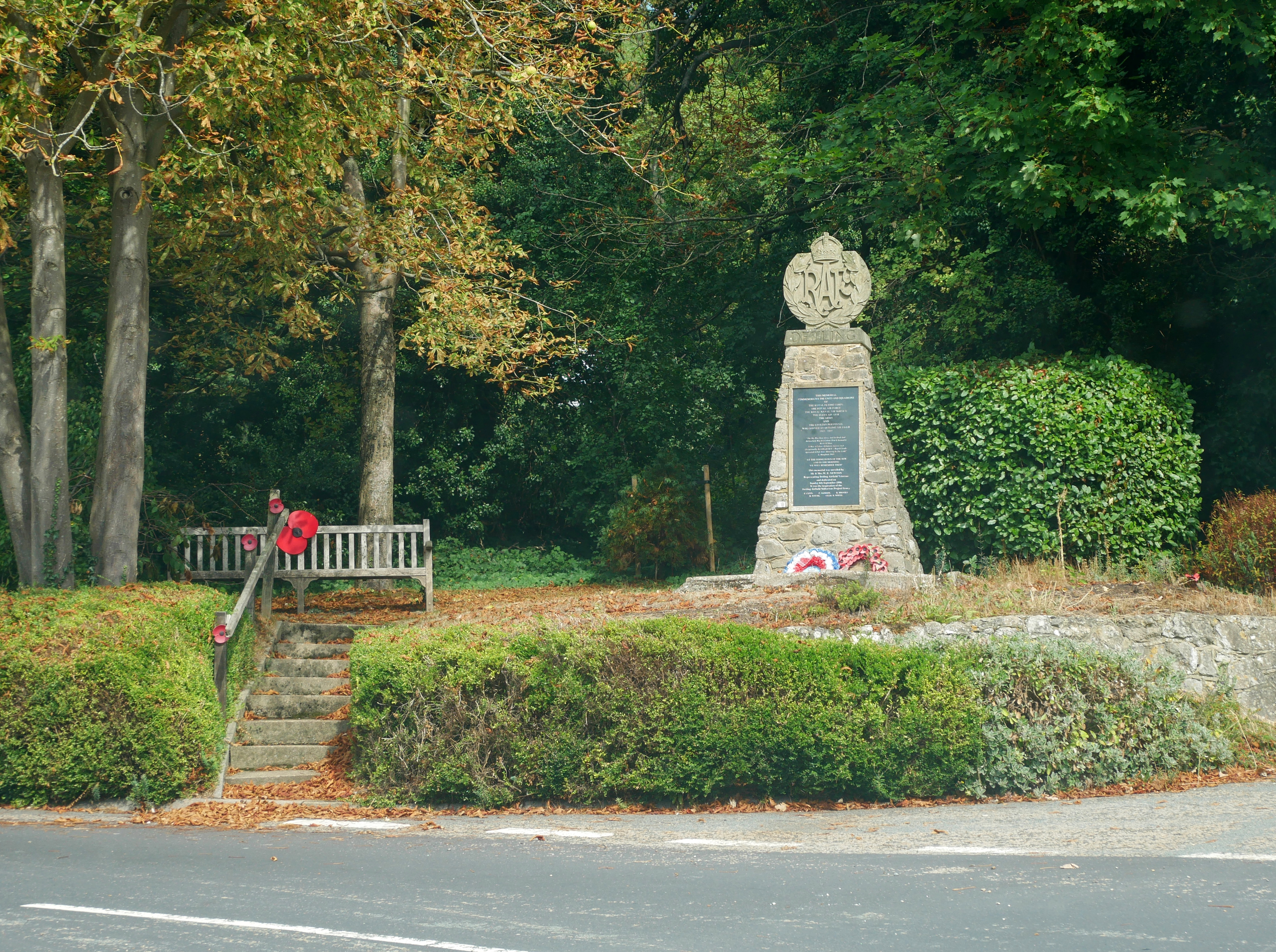
- This memorial commemorates the units and squadrons of the Royal Flying Corps, the Royal Air Force, the Royal Naval Air Service, the Fleet Air Arm, the army and civilian personnel who served at Detling Air Field

Site information
- Type: Royal Air Force station
- Code: DQ
- Owner: Air Ministry
- Operator: Royal Air Force
- Controlled by: RAF Bomber Command 1938 * No. 6 Group RAF; RAF Coastal Command 1938–43 * No. 16 Group RAF; RAF Army Cooperation Command 1943; RAF Fighter Command 1943 * No. 11 Group RAF; Second Tactical Air Force * No. 83 Group RAF; Air Defence of Great Britain

Location
- Shown within Kent RAF Detling (the United Kingdom)
- Coordinates: 51°18′18″N 000°35′36″E

Site history
- Built: 1937/38
- In use: September 1938 – October 1959
- Battles/wars: European theatre of World War II; Cold War

Airfield information
- Elevation: 161 metres (528 ft) AMSL
Runways
Direction	Length and surface
04/22	1,280 metres (4,199 ft) Grass
00/00	Grass
00/00	Grass

Royal Air Force Detling or more simply RAF Detling is a former Royal Air Force station situated 600 feet (180 m) above sea level, located near Detling, a village about 4 miles (6.4 km) miles north-east of Maidstone, Kent.

It was a station of the Royal Naval Air Service (RNAS) in the First World War and the Royal Air Force (RAF) in the Second World War. The airfield suffered several raids by the Luftwaffe, especially during the period of the Battle of Britain.

== History ==
RNAS Detling airfield was 4 miles (6.4 km) north east of Maidstone, and was used jointly by the Navy and Air Force between 1916 and 1919. The Fleet Air Arm aircraft also shared some facilities during the second World War. The site was developed in April 1915, covering some 95 acres (38 ha), although it was April 1917 before the first occupants, No. 50 Squadron arrived from Dover. The airfield closed in December 1919 to military flying, and after the war it was used by the Short factory at Rochester to test aircraft, and civilian gliding also started in 1930.

RAF Detling opened in September 1938 and was assigned to No. 16 Group RAF (headquartered in Chatham) in Coastal Command, for patrols protecting coastal shipping. Although the site was prone to fog, it was re-activated as it had an excellent view over the Medway towns. The airfield consisted of grassed fields, with the longest runway being 4,200 feet (1,300 m) long orientated in a north east/south west direction. No. 500 Sqn were the first squadron to move in from RAF Manston. During the Battle of Britain, the base was subject to several raids by enemy aircraft, but also provided a useful stopover location for aircraft from No. 11 Group who could return to their home bases later. On 13 August 1940, a day the Luftwaffe codenamed Adlertag (Eagle Day), at least 50 bombers set out to bomb Detling and RAF Rochford. This resulted in several casualties at Detling, but had little effect on Fighter Command, as the base was an asset of Coastal Command. Twenty-two aircraft were destroyed on the ground, the hangars were set alight and a direct hit on the operations room killed the commanding officer. In total, 67 service and civilian personnel were killed in the raid. The base suffered several attacks during August and September 1940.

In 1943, it was transferred first to RAF Army Cooperation Command, then to Fighter Command, ahead of the D Day landings. By December 1944, all flying had ceased, and being a grassed airfield, which were surplus to requirements, Detling was placed on a care and maintenance basis from 1 January 1945. Fears of Nazi fanatics not abiding by a surrender, led to the RAF Regiment setting up a disarmament school, teaching students about booby-trapped buildings and dealing with German prisoners. RAF gliding schools used the site after the war, with the Air Training Corps gliders using the airfield alongside civilian gliding clubs. However, these all had to leave when the RAF disposed of the site back to its original owners who were not interested in running it as a gliding site, eventually closing in 1959.

The site of the airfield is now home to the annual Kent County Show, which takes place for three days every July, and a number of other shows and events.

== Notable personnel ==
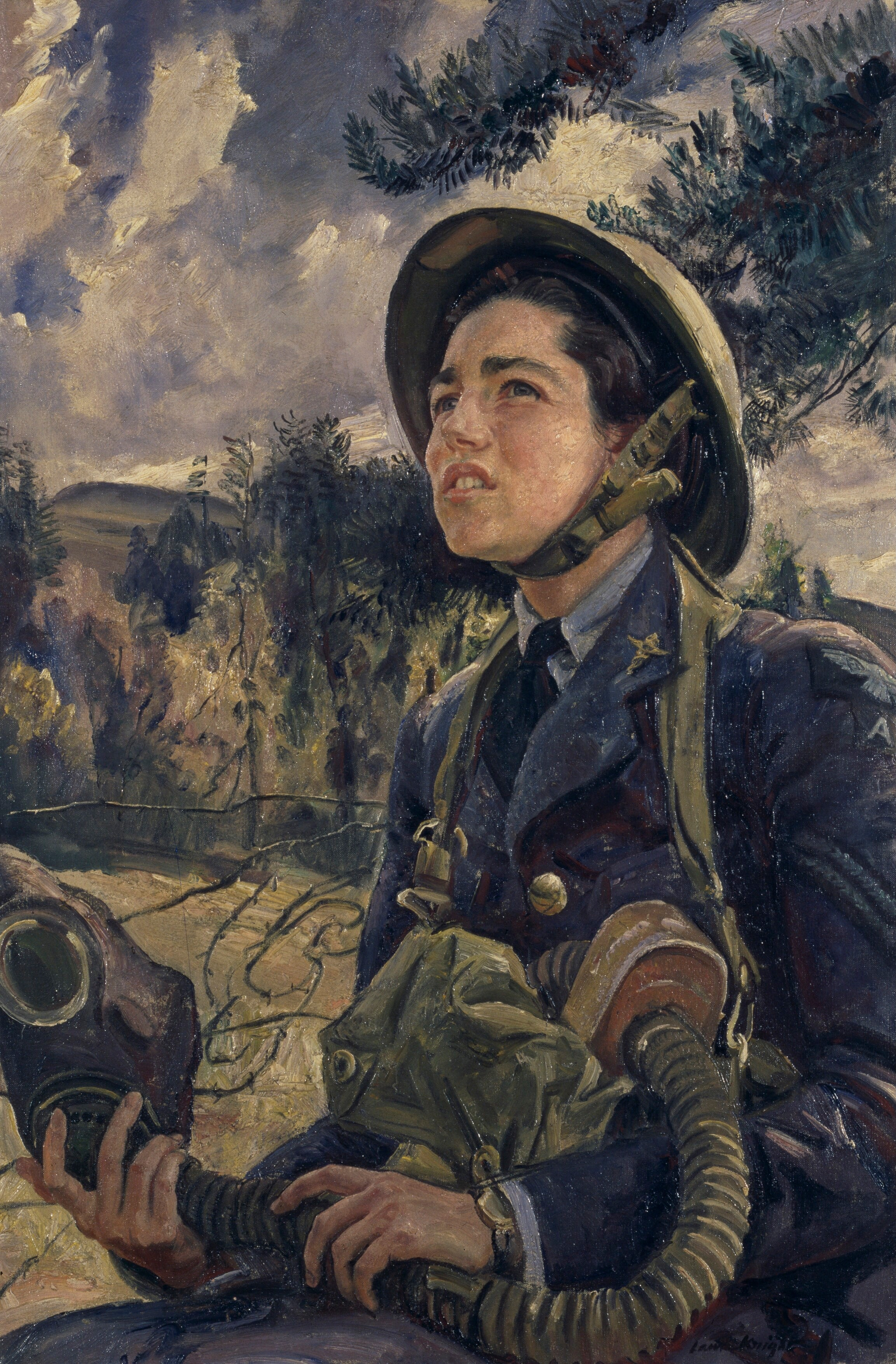
Corporal J. D. M. Pearson, GC, WAAF by Laura Knight (1940)

- Ronald Cuthbert Hay – Served with No. 801 Squadron NAS in 1940 at the base.
- Daphne Pearson – Pearson was billeted at Detling in 1940 when she was awarded a George Cross for an act of bravery in rescuing a pilot from a burning aircraft which had crashed on the airfield. Pearson had just got him to safety when the bombs on board exploded. Initially awarded the Empire Gallantry Medal, this was changed to the George Cross later.

== Operational units and aircraft ==
First World War

- No. 50 Squadron RFC Detachment (1916) – Vickers E.S.1
- No. 112 Squadron RFC (1917) – Vickers E.S.1
- No. 143 Squadron RFC/RAF (1918–1919) – Armstrong Whitworth FK.8, Royal Aircraft Factory SE.5A, Sopwith Camel & Sopwith Snipe

Inter war period and Second World War

- No. 500 (County of Kent) Squadron AAF (1938–1939) – Hawker Hind, Avro Anson I
- No. 48 Squadron RAF Detachment (1939) – Avro Anson I – provided support to 500 Squadron
- No. 4 Squadron RAF Detachment (1940) – Westland Lysander II
- No. 53 Squadron RAF (1940) – Bristol Blenheim IV
- No. 235 Squadron RAF (1940) – Bristol Blenheim 1F
- 806 Naval Air Squadron's Detachment No. 9 between 7 and 31 May 1940 with the Skua II
- 825 Naval Air Squadron initially between 18 and 28 May 1940 then again between 1 and 5 July 1940 with the Swordfish I
- 819 Naval Air Squadron's Detachment No. 6 between 21 and 23 May 1940 with the Swordfish I
- 815 Naval Air Squadron between 27 May and 2 June 1940 with the Swordfish I
- 826 Naval Air Squadron between 31 May and 1 June 1940 with the Albacore I
- 801 Naval Air Squadron between 31 May and 23 June 1940 with the Skua II
- 812 Naval Air Squadron's Detachment No. 7 between 27 and 28 August 1940 with the Swordfish I
- 812 Naval Air Squadron's Detachment No. 2 between 27 December 1940 and 12 March 1941 with the Swordfish
- No. 13 Squadron RAF Detachment (1941) – Bristol Blenheim IV
- No. 26 (South African) Squadron RAF (1941) – Curtiss Tomahawk II
- No. 59 Squadron RAF (1941) – Bristol Blenheim IV
- 816 Naval Air Squadron's Detachment No. 2 initially between 12 March and 4 April 1941 and then between 11 and 16 April 1941. 'X' Flight joined on 23 April 1941 until being redesignated as 821 NAS on 1 July 1941
- 821 Naval Air Squadron between 1 July and 14 July 1941 with the Swordfish I
- No. 239 Squadron RAF (1942) – North American Mustang I
- No. 280 Squadron RAF (1942) – Avro Anson I
- No. 26 (South African) Squadron RAF (1943) – North American Mustang II
- No. 318 Polish Fighter-Reconnaissance Squadron (1943) – Hawker Hurricane I
- No. 567 Squadron RAF (1943–1944) – Fairey Barracuda, Miles Martinet, Hawker Hurricane IV & Airspeed Oxford
- No. 655 Squadron RAF (1943) – Taylorcraft Auster III
- No. 125 Airfield Headquarters RAF (October 1943 – May 1944)
  - No. 132 (City of Bombay) Squadron RAF (1943) – Supermarine Spitfire IXB
  - No. 184 Squadron RAF (1943) – Hawker Hurricane IV
  - No. 602 (City of Glasgow) Squadron AAF (1943) – Supermarine Spitfire IXB
- No. 1 Squadron RAF (1944) – Supermarine Spitfire IXB
- No. 118 Squadron RAF (1944) – Supermarine Spitfire IX
- No. 124 (Baroda) Squadron RAF (1944) – Supermarine Spitfire VII & HF.IXE
- No. 165 (Ceylon) Squadron RAF (1944) – Supermarine Spitfire IXB
- No. 453 Squadron RAAF (1944) – Supermarine Spitfire IXB
- No. 504 (County of Nottingham) Squadron AAF (1944) – Supermarine Spitfire IXE
- Unknown Fighter Wing
  - No. 80 Squadron RAF (1944) – Supermarine Spitfire IX
  - No. 229 Squadron RAF (1944) – Supermarine Spitfire IX
  - No. 274 Squadron RAF (1944) – Supermarine Spitfire IX
- No. 651 Squadron RAF (No. 1903 Flight) (1951–1955) – Bristol Sycamore HC.11
- No. 651 Squadron RAF (No. 1902 Flight) (1955–1957) – Auster AOP.6

The following units were also here at some point:

- No. 1 Coast Artillery Co-operation Unit RAF (September 1939 – May 1940) became No. 1 Coast Artillery Co-operation Flight (May 1940 – April 1941)
- 'K' Flight of No. 1 Photographic Reconnaissance Unit RAF (January – August 1942)
- 'D' Flight of No. 2 Anti-Aircraft Co-operation Unit RAF (June 1941 – February 1943) became No. 1624 (Anti-Aircraft Co-operation) Flight RAF (February – December 1943)
- No. 3 Aircraft Delivery Flight RAF (July – September 1943)
- No. 4 Aircraft Delivery Flight RAF (September – October 1943)
- No. 6 Anti-Aircraft Co-operation Unit RAF (September – November 1943)
- No. 16 Group Communication Flight RAF (June 1941 – January 1945)
- No. 75 (Signals) Wing RAF (December 1945 – November 1946)
- No. 141 Gliding School RAF (October 1951 – September 1955)
- No. 168 Gliding School RAF (June 1949 – September 1955)
- No. 403 Repair & Salvage Unit (September – October 1943)
- No. 405 Repair & Salvage Unit (January – March 1944)
- No. 410 Repair & Salvage Unit (November 1943 – January 1944)
- No. 615 Gliding School RAF (? – June 1962)
- No. 1338 Wing RAF Regiment
- No. 1493 (Fighter) Gunnery Flight RAF (July – October 1943)
- No. 1903 Air Observation Post Flight RAF (February 1955 – January 1956)
- No. 2709 Squadron RAF Regiment
- No. 2733 Squadron RAF Regiment
- No. 2746 Squadron RAF Regiment
- No. 2751 Squadron RAF Regiment
- No. 2753 Squadron RAF Regiment
- No. 2768 Squadron RAF Regiment
- No. 2769 Squadron RAF Regiment
- No. 2773 Squadron RAF Regiment
- No. 2793 Squadron RAF Regiment
- No. 2822 Squadron RAF Regiment
- No. 2828 Squadron RAF Regiment
- No. 2877 Squadron RAF Regiment
- No. 4018 Anti-Aircraft Flight RAF Regiment
- No. 4138 Anti-Aircraft Flight RAF Regiment
- Reserve Command Gliding Instructors School RAF (1949–50) became Home Command Gliding Instructors School RAF (1950–55) became Home Command Gliding Centre RAF (1955)
- No. 1336 Wing RAF Regiment
  - No. 2814 Squadron RAF Regiment
  - No. 2878 Squadron RAF Regiment
  - No. 2749 Squadron RAF Regiment
