= Detling Summer Conference =

Detling Summer Conference, or Detling, is an annual summer gathering of Christians at the Kent Showground, near the village of Detling, Kent, UK, from which the conference takes its current name. It was formerly known as Revival Fire.

== Event ==
The event was founded by the Rev. Eric Delve and Christian musician Russ Hughes in 2000. Hughes left the organisation in 2006.

The conference consists of music, seminars, keynote speakers and groups for children of all ages, attracting families. Late night music events and comedy are also featured. Although people choose to visit daily, half of the 5000 daily visitors camp on site. Each year's event has a different theme including The Spirit and the Bride, Your Kingdom Come, After God's Own Heart (2008) and in 2009 Nothing is impossible.

Over the years Detling has attracted many well known Christian speakers including the former Westminster Chapel pastor Dr. RT Kendall, the General Director of Evangelical Alliance Rev. Joel Edwards, missionary Jackie Pullinger MBE, Adrian Plass and J John.

== Music ==
A number of 'live worship' music CDs have been released, including Let Every Step We Take, Your Kingdom Come, "As It Is In Heaven", Rhythms of Grace, "Nothing Is Impossible" and "Rise, Run, Reign". Also released are recordings of live 'ministry' music from the River Event, The River (2002) and Return to the River.

== Organisation ==
The event was jointly organised by a UK Limited Company - Revival Fire Conferences Ltd - and a Registered UK Charity, The Spirit and the Bride Trust. The main aims of the charity were to 'make grants to other organisations'. From 2008 a non-profit company limited by guarantee called People without Limits took over.

In July 2008 to raise funds for the event, Eric Delve spoke for 24 hours, setting a world record for the longest outdoor preach.

The organisation has created several offshoot organisations, including All Saints Praise and Eurofire. All Saints Praise has been held on Halloween at Canterbury Cathedral since 2000 and consists of singing and a speaker. In 2008, it was also held at Guildford Cathedral, led by Rev. Andrew Delaney.

== See also ==
- New Wine
- Spring Harvest
