= St Nicholas Olave =

Coordinates: 51°30′43″N 0°5′36″W

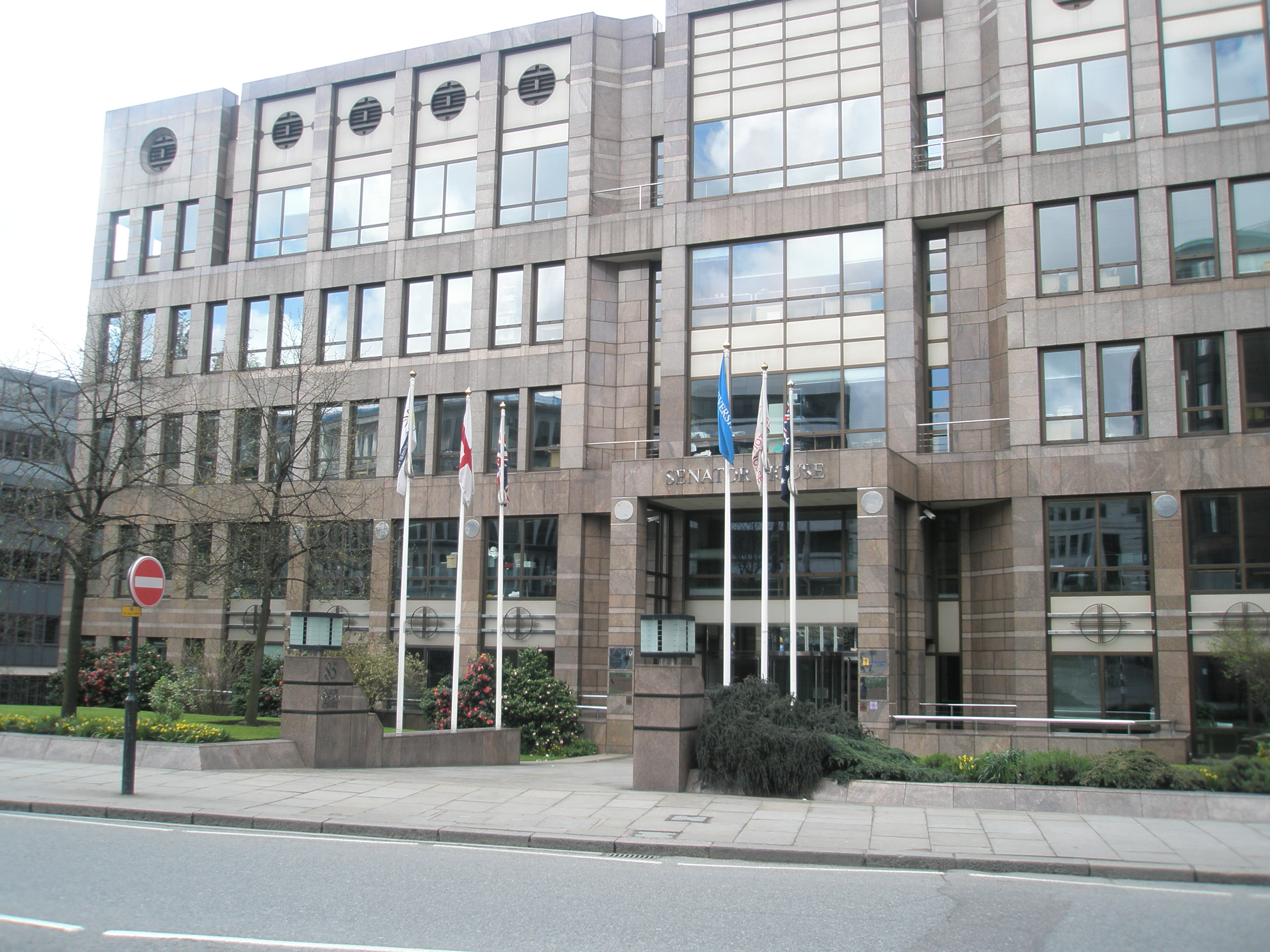
- Current photo of site
- St Nicholas Olave
- Location: Bread Street Hill, London
- Country: England
- Denomination: Anglican, originally Roman Catholic

History
- Founded: 11th century

Architecture
- Demolished: 1666

St Nicholas Olave was a church in the City of London, on the west side of Bread Street Hill in Queenhithe Ward. It was destroyed in the Great Fire of London and was never rebuilt. Instead the parish was united with that of St Nicholas Cole Abbey.

== History ==
The dedication of the church derives from the earlier amalgamation between two parishes: St Nicholas and St Olave Bradestrat, which was removed by the Austin Friars for the erection of their monastic buildings. Described by John Stow as a “convenient church” the parish had strong connections with the Worshipful Company of Fishmongers, many members of which were buried in the churchyard. Its eminent organist William Blitheman also lay here. Following the fire the parish was united with that of St Nicholas Cole Abbey Some parish records survive.

The site is currently occupied by Senator House.
