= No. 500 Squadron RAuxAF =

Royal Air Force flying squadron

No. 500 (County of Kent) Squadron RAuxAF
- Active: 16 Mar 1931 – 11 Jul 1944; 1 Aug 1944 – 23 Oct 1945; 10 May 1946 – 10 Mar 1957
- Country: United Kingdom
- Branch: Royal Air Force
- Role: Various
- Part of: Royal Auxiliary Air Force
- Nickname: County of Kent
- Mottos: Latin: Quo fata vocent (Translation: "Whither the fates may call")
- Battle honours: Channel and North Sea, 1939–41; Dunkirk; Biscay ports, 1941; Atlantic, 1941–42; North Africa, 1942–43; Mediterranean, 1942–44; Italy, 1944–45. These honours are all emblazoned on the squadron standard

Commanders
- Honorary Air Commodores: The Duke of Kent; Anthony Eden
- Notable commanders: Denis Spotswood

Insignia
- Squadron Badge heraldry: A horse forcene The white horse of Kent was adopted to commemorate the squadron's association with that country
- Squadron Codes: SQ (Apr 1939 – Sep 1939); MK (Sep 1939 – Apr 1944); RAA (May 1946 – 1950); S7 (1950–1951)
- Post-1950 squadron roundel

No. 500 (County of Kent) Squadron AAF was a Royal Air Force flying squadron. It was initially formed in 1931 as a Special Reserve squadron and in 1936 became part of the Auxiliary Air Force, at this time based at Manston and Detling.

During the Second World War, the squadron served in both Coastal Command and Bomber Command. In the coastal role, the squadron undertook operations over the English Channel in 1940–1941, before moving to North Africa in late 1942. It undertook anti-submarine operations in support of Operation Torch and then continued operations in the Mediterranean, operating various aircraft types during this period. In July 1944, the squadron disbanded before being reformed as a bomber squadron in Algeria in August, later operating in Italy in the final years of the war.

Following the war, the squadron was disbanded in October 1945. In May 1946, it was re-formed as an auxiliary squadron within Fighter Command. Initially it operated in the night fighter role and then later as a day fighter unit equipped with jet aircraft before being disbanded in 1957.

== History ==
=== Formation and early years ===
The Squadron was formed at RAF Manston on 16 March 1931 as the first Special Reserve night-bomber squadron with Vickers Virginia Mk.X aircraft. On 25 May 1936 the role changed to day-bombing and the squadron became part of the Auxiliary Air Force, flying Hawker Harts, later replaced with Hawker Hinds.

=== To Coastal Command ===
On 7 November 1938 the squadron saw another role change as it was transferred to RAF Coastal Command and became a general reconnaissance squadron as part of 16 Group. It re-equipped with Avro Anson Mk. I twin-engine monoplanes from March 1939. The outbreak of the Second World War in September 1939 saw the squadron deployed on patrols and convoy escort operations off the coast of Essex and East Anglia, transferring to operations over the English Channel in January 1940. The Battle of France saw 500's aircraft being involved in increasingly heavy action, covering the evacuation of British and French troops from Dunkirk, and attacking German-held harbours. In the night of 30/31 May a 500 Squadron Anson crash-landed at the squadron's base at RAF Detling on returning from a raid on the Channel ports. The aircraft caught fire, and Corporal Daphne Pearson, a member of the WAAF was awarded the George Cross for rescuing the pilot from the burning aircraft before it exploded. On 1 June, three of the squadron's Ansons were patrolling off Dunkirk when they came under attack by as many as nine German Messerschmitt Bf 109 fighters. The Ansons had been modified to improve their armament by adding two beam machine guns, and one of the Ansons claimed two Bf 109s shot down. While the squadron further modified the armament of some of its Ansons in August for use against German E-boats by adding a 20 mm cannon firing through the floor, it was increasingly deployed on convoy escort duties.

In April 1941 the Ansons were replaced with Bristol Blenheims which were deployed on anti-shipping and air-sea rescue duties, as well as night intruder operations over German-occupied Europe. The squadron moved from Detling to RAF Bircham Newton in May that year and converted to Lockheed Hudsons in November 1941. In March 1942, the squadron moved to RAF Stornoway in Scotland, with detachments at Limavady in Northern Ireland for anti-submarine patrols over the Western Approaches. It moved again in at the end of August to RAF St Eval in Cornwall, but this was only a brief stopover before moving to Gibraltar on 5 November 1942 in preparation for the Allied invasion of French North-West Africa.

=== Mediterranean operations ===
The Allied landings saw 500 Squadron being very heavily deployed to protect the invasion shipping, making many attacks against German submarines attempting to interfere with the landings. On 8 November, half of the 500 Squadron ground crew landed along the beaches of Algeria, Oran and Arzeu, after having been dispatched to the Clyde River to board the SS Strathallan. The Strathallan made a second trip, also carrying 500 Squadron members but was sunk by a U-boat off Oran. Meanwhile, also on the first day of the landings, the squadron flew patrols in their newly painted, desert colours, Hudsons. These were mainly over the invasion beaches at Oran, with one of its Hudsons slightly damaged by gunfire from a German Heinkel He 111 bomber. On 11 September the Squadron established an advanced base at Tafraoui near Oran, Algeria, and on the same day, one of the squadron's Hudsons claimed a Junkers Ju 52 transport shot down near Alboran Island. (Note: Owing to the location, far from German supply routes, it is possible this may have been a neutral Spanish aircraft en route between mainland Spain and Spanish Morocco.) On 13 November, a 500 Squadron Hudson attacked the German submarine U-458 with depth charges and machine gun fire, badly damaging it and forcing it to return to base. The next day, six 500 Squadron Hudsons attacked the German submarine U-595, which had been damaged earlier in the day by aircraft from 608 Squadron north of Oran and was unable to dive. U-595 survived, and four of the Hudsons were hit by anti-aircraft fire from the submarine, but as a result of the damage, U-595's commander deliberately ran the submarine aground. Also that day, U-411 was sunk by one of the squadron's Hudsons west of Gibraltar. On 15 November one of the squadron's aircraft, piloted by Mick Ensor, bombed and sunk U-259. The explosion badly damaged the Hudson, forcing it to ditch, with only Ensor and the rear gunner being rescued. Two more U-boats were attacked that day, and another on 16 November. On 17 November, an attack by three 500 Squadron Hudsons badly damaged U-331, which signalled surrender, but the submarine was sunk by a Fleet Air Arm Albacore torpedo bomber, which was unaware of U-331's surrender. On 17 December, one of the squadron's Hudsons attacked an Italian submarine without result, while another shot down an Italian Cant Z.1007 bomber. On 27 December, one of the squadron's Hudsons attacked the German submarine U-73, but was badly damaged by anti-aircraft fire from the U-boat, and was forced to ditch.

The squadron's aircraft continued to fly anti-submarine patrols over the Mediterranean, sinking U-83 on 4 March 1943. On the night of 23/24 April, a Hudson was badly damaged while attacking U-453, the pilot being killed. The aircraft was flown back to base by its radio operator, where the surviving crew bailed out. On 26 May 1943, a 500 Squadron Hudson spotted U-755 north of Alboran Island. Despite being hit on its first pass, the Hudson made a further two attacks, badly damaging the submarine, which was forced to abort its patrol. U-755 was sunk on 28 May by a rocket attack by a Hudson of 608 Squadron before reaching port. In late September 1943, and working closely with the Special Operations Executive (SOE), who were also stationed at La Senia developing underwing rockets and radar for the Hudsons, a Hudson and crew from 500 Squadron was chosen to fly into occupied Corsica at Ghisonaccia Gare aerodrome, with the orders to "establish squatters' rights" under the command of Colonel McKenzie of 458 Squadron. Later, from December 1943, the squadron's Hudsons began to be replaced with Lockheed Venturas. This process continued until the squadron was completely equipped with them in April 1944. The squadron operated from a range of bases over the Western Mediterranean, including bases on Sicily, mainland Italy and Corsica. On 17 May 1944, the German submarine U-960 launched an unsuccessful torpedo attack against the American destroyer USS Ellyson off Mers-el-Kébir, which resulted in a large-scale air and sea operation to hunt the submarine, involving five American destroyers and saturation air cover from the Wellingtons of 36 Squadron and the Venturas of 500 Squadron. Early on 19 May the submarine was spotted by a Wellington, which directed the destroyers USS Ludlow and USS Niblack as they carried out a sustained series of depth charge attacks that drove the submarine to the surface. The submarine was then bombed by a Ventura of 500 Squadron and shelled by the two destroyers before being sunk by Niblack. The squadron disbanded on 11 July 1944, handing over its Venturas to No. 27 Squadron SAAF.

=== Back in Bomber Command ===
The Squadron was reformed on 1 August 1944 at La Sénia as a bomber squadron, employing many of the personnel of the squadron's previous incarnation. It operated Martin Baltimore light bombers as part of the Desert Air Force, flying from bases in Italy by day and later by night for the remainder of the war in Europe. In September 1945, No. 500 Squadron left Italy and headed for Kenya, being renumbered on arrival 23 October 1945 at RAF Eastleigh to No. 249 Squadron RAF. During World War II the squadron members had been awarded with 1 GC, 2 DSOs, 21 DFCs, 1 bar the DFC, 9 DFMs and one CGM. Beside these, the squadron was mentioned in dispatches 25 times.

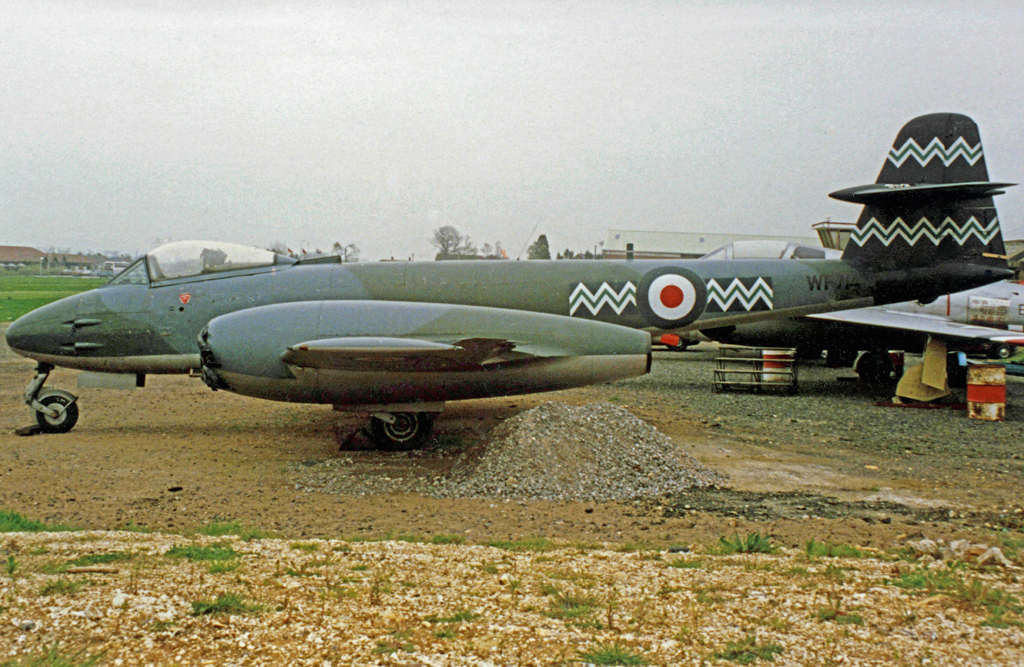
Gloster Meteor preserved wearing the postwar unit markings of No. 500 Squadron.

=== To Fighter Command ===
The Squadron was reformed again on 10 May 1946 at RAF West Malling, equipped with Mosquito NF.19s and later NF.30s, as a night fighter squadron in the Royal Auxiliary Air Force. Later, following an Air Ministry decision to convert all RAuxAF units to day fighter roles, the squadron became equipped with Meteor F.3s. The squadron disbanded finally on 10 March 1957, along with all other flying squadrons of the RAuxAF.

== Notable squadron members ==
- Daphne Pearson
- Denis Spotswood

== Aircraft operated ==
Aircraft operated by no. 500 Squadron RAuxAF
From	To	Aircraft	Version
March 1931	January 1936	Vickers Virginia	Mk.X
January 1936	May 1937	Hawker Hart	
February 1937	March 1939	Hawker Hind	
March 1939	April 1941	Avro Anson	Mk.I.
April 1941	November 1941	Bristol Blenheim	Mk.IV
November 1941	April 1944	Lockheed Hudson	Mks.III, V.
December 1943	July 1944	Lockheed Ventura	Mk.V
September 1944	February 1945	Martin Baltimore	Mk.IV
September 1944	October 1945	Martin Baltimore	Mk.V
February 1947	August 1947	de Havilland Mosquito	NF.19
April 1947	October 1948	de Havilland Mosquito	NF.30
May 1948	October 1948	Supermarine Spitfire	F.22
July 1948	October 1951	Gloster Meteor	F.3
July 1951	February 1952	Gloster Meteor	F.4
November 1951	March 1957	Gloster Meteor	F.8

== Squadron bases ==
Bases and airfields used by no. 500 Squadron AAF, data from
From	To	Base
16 March 1931	28 September 1938	RAF Manston, Kent
28 September 1938	30 July 1939	RAF Detling, Kent
30 July 1939	13 August 1939	RAF Warmwell, Dorset
13 August 1939	30 May 1941	RAF Detling, Kent
30 May 1941	2 April 1942	RAF Bircham Newton, Norfolk
2 April 1942	31 August 1942	RAF Stornoway, Western Isles, Scotland
31 August 1942	5 November 1942	RAF St Eval, Cornwall
5 November 1942	11 November 1942	RAF Gibraltar
11 November 1942	19 November 1942	RAF Tafaraoui, Algeria
19 November 1942	3 May 1943	RAF Blida, Algeria
3 May 1943	6 January 1944	RAF Tafaraoui, Algeria
28 September 1943	January 1944	RAF Ghisonaccia Gare, Corsica
6 January 1944	11 July 1944	RAF La Senia, Algeria
1 August 1944	24 August 1944	RAF La Senia
24 August 1944	14 September 1944	en route to Italy
14 September 1944	15 October 1944	Pescara, Italy
15 October 1944	9 December 1944	Perugia, Italy
9 December 1944	10 May 1945	Cesenatico, Italy
10 May 1945	28 September 1945	RAF Eastleigh, Kenya
10 May 1946	10 March 1957	RAF West Malling, Kent

== Commanding officers ==
Officers commanding no. 500 Squadron RAuxAF, data from
From	To	Name
March 1931	July 1931	S/Ldr. S.R. Watkins, AFC
July 1931	July 1933	W/Cdr. L.F. Forbes, MC
July 1933	May 1935	W/Cdr. R. Halley, DFC, AFC
May 1935	April 1936	S/Ldr. G.M. Lawson, MC
April 1936	October 1936	F/Lt. W.G. Wooliams
October 1936	October 1939	S/Ldr. G.K. Hohler, Aux.AF
October 1939	June 1940	S/Ldr. W. LeMay, Aux.AF
June 1940	March 1941	W/Cdr. G.H. Turner
March 1941	July 1941	W/Cdr. M.Q. Candler
July 1941	April 1942	W/Cdr. G.T. Gilbert
April 1942	April 1943	W/Cdr. D.F. Spotswood, DSO, DFC
April 1943	April 1944	W/Cdr. D.G. Keddie
April 1944	June 1944	W/Cdr. C.K. Bonner
June 1944	July 1944	W/Cdr. C.E.A. Garton
July 1944	August 1945	W/Cdr. H.N. Garbett
August 1945	October 1945	W/Cdr. Matson
August 1946	February 1949	S/Ldr. P. Green, OBE, AFC, R.Aux.AF
February 1949	March 1952	S/Ldr. M.C. Kennard, DFC, R.Aux.AF
March 1952	August 1954	S/Ldr. D. de Villiers, R.Aux.AF
August 1954	October 1954	S/Ldr. D.M. Clause
October 1954	March 1957	S/Ldr. D.H.M. Chandler

== See also ==
- List of Royal Air Force aircraft squadrons
- Royal Auxiliary Air Force
