= Corporal J. D. M. Pearson, GC, WAAF =

1940 painting by Laura Knight

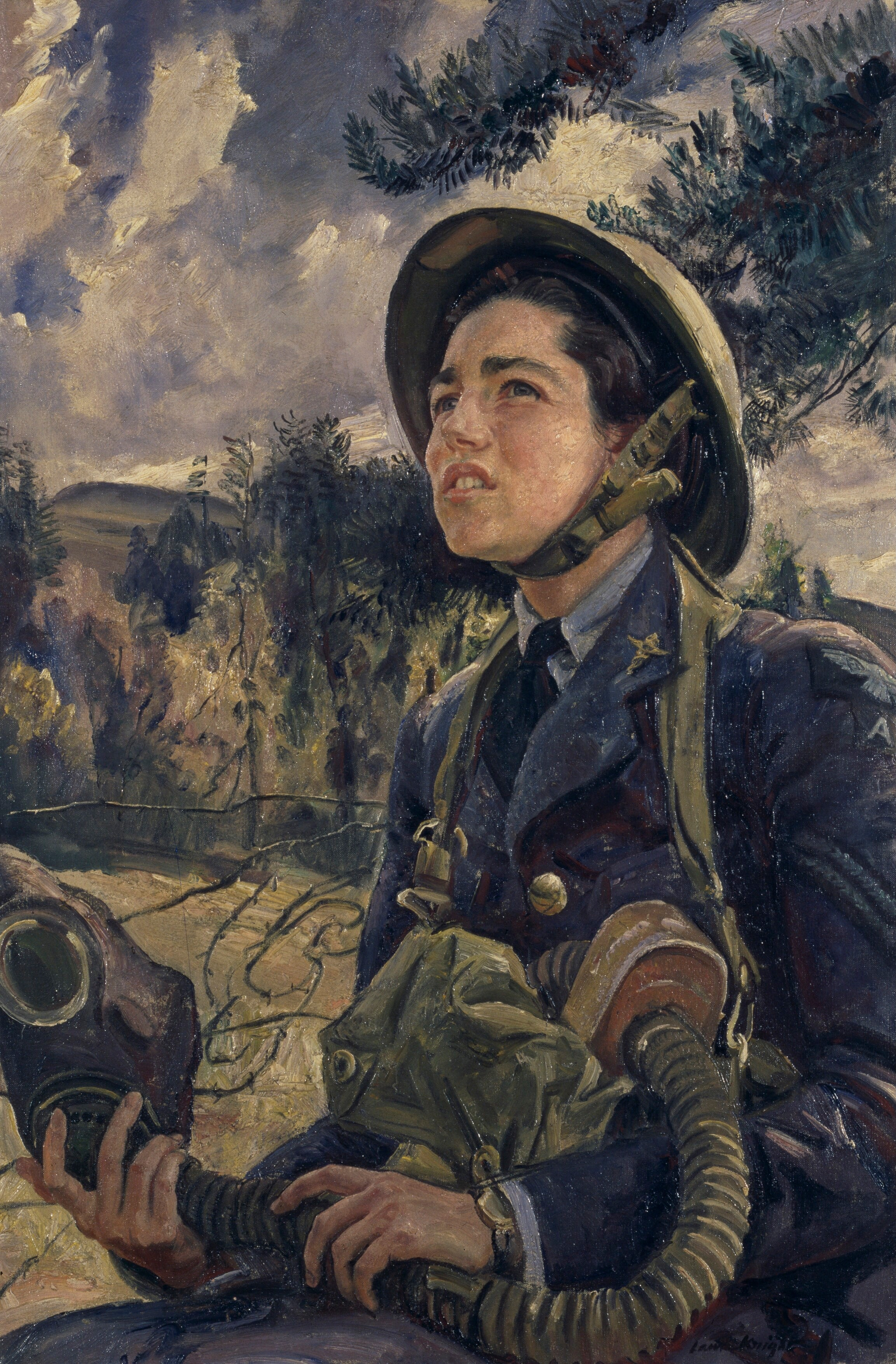
- Artist: Laura Knight
- Year: 1940
- Medium: Oil on canvas
- Dimensions: 91.4 cm × 60.9 cm (36.0 in × 24.0 in)
- Location: Imperial War Museum, London

Corporal J. D. M. Pearson, GC, WAAF is a 1940 oil-on-canvas painting by English artist Laura Knight. The painting was made in tribute to Corporal Daphne Pearson, who had been involved in the rescuing of a pilot of a crashed airplane the same year. It is held at the Imperial War Museum, in London.

== History and description ==
English corporal Daphne Pearson was serving in the WAAF at the beginning of World War II when she was involved in the rescuing of the pilot of an Avro Anson, who had crashed in Detling, Kent, in the early hours of 31 May 1940. While she helped the pilot escape from the wreckage of the airplane, one of his bombs exploded. She protected the pilot from the explosion by throwing herself upon him. She wasn't able to save the other two crew members, who had died. Pearson was one the first members of the WAAF to be given an award for her heroic act, first the Empire Gallantry Medal, shortly replaced by the George Cross.

Knight made this portrait the same year, as a tribute to Pearson and her heroism. She decided not to depict the actual incident. Pearson is instead portrayed in the countryside, seated, in uniform, looking to the sky, with an expectant expression, while holding a respirator. Knight originally had decided to paint Pearson holding a rifle. It was found that women in the WAAF at the time weren't allowed to carry weapons, so Knight replaced it by a respirator, which Pearson still holds in a similar position to the original rifle.

Catherine Speck states that this painting "is a rather saccharine composition in comparison with the drama of the occasion".
