= Listed buildings in Detling =

Historic structures in Kent, England

Detling is a village and civil parish in the Borough of Maidstone of Kent, England It contains one grade I and 24 grade II listed buildings that are recorded in the National Heritage List for England.

This list is based on the information retrieved online from Historic England.

== Key ==
Grade	Criteria
I	Buildings that are of exceptional interest
II*	Particularly important buildings of more than special interest
II	Buildings that are of special interest

== Listing ==
Name	Grade	Location	Type	Completed (Note: The date given is the date used by Historic England as significant for the initial building or that of an important part in the structure's description.)	Date designated	Grid ref. (Note: The grid reference is based on the British national grid reference system, sometimes known as OSGB36, used by the Ordnance Survey.) Geo-coordinates	Notes	Entry number (Note: The "List Entry Number" is a unique number assigned to each listed building and scheduled monument by Historic England.)	Image	Wikidata
Harpole	II	Harple Lane			21 June 1977	TQ7858558306; 51°17′45″N 0°33′36″E		1336269	Upload Photo	Q26620777
The Old Cottage	II	Hermitage Lane			20 July 1984	TQ7979659782; 51°18′32″N 0°34′41″E		1086220	Upload Photo	Q26376263
Cockhill Farmhouse	II	Lower Cox Street			20 July 1984	TQ8154961696; 51°19′31″N 0°36′15″E		1336258	Upload Photo	Q26620769
Lower Cox Street Farmhouse	II	Lower Cox Street			20 July 1984	TQ8114260982; 51°19′09″N 0°35′53″E		1186023	Upload Photo	Q26481295
Park Valley House	II	Lower Cox Street			26 April 1968	TQ8116260956; 51°19′08″N 0°35′54″E		1336270	Upload Photo	Q26620778
Caresend	II	Pilgrims Way			20 July 1984	TQ7937258301; 51°17′44″N 0°34′17″E		1299387	Upload Photo	Q26586795
Dovecot in Garden of Medway House	II	Pilgrims Way			20 July 1984	TQ7940258332; 51°17′45″N 0°34′19″E		1186028	Upload Photo	Q26481300
The Cottage	II	Pilgrims Way			20 July 1984	TQ7935758315; 51°17′45″N 0°34′16″E		1086221	Upload Photo	Q26376268
Gateway and Garden Wall of East Court, with Mounting Block Attached	II	Pilgrims Way			26 April 1968	TQ7933058348; 51°17′46″N 0°34′15″E		1086222	Upload Photo	Q26376274
Polehill Farmhouse	II	Scragged Oak Road			20 July 1984	TQ8005060340; 51°18′49″N 0°34′56″E		1336271	Upload Photo	Q26620779
Pollyfields Farmhouse	II	Scragged Oak Road			26 April 1968	TQ7998760266; 51°18′47″N 0°34′52″E		1186062	Upload Photo	Q26481335
Scragged Oak Farmhouse	II	Scragged Oak Road			20 July 1984	TQ8048761157; 51°19′15″N 0°35′20″E		1086223	Upload Photo	Q26376279
26, the Street	II	26, The Street			20 July 1984	TQ7930558267; 51°17′43″N 0°34′13″E		1336272	Upload Photo	Q26620780
42 and 44, the Street	II	42 and 44, The Street			26 April 1968	TQ7932358338; 51°17′45″N 0°34′14″E		1299372	Upload Photo	Q26586780
Church of St Martin of Tours	I	The Street			26 April 1968	TQ7919658159; 51°17′40″N 0°34′08″E		1086225	Church of St Martin of Tours More images	Q7594221
Coopers Cottage	II	40, The Street			26 April 1968	TQ7932058331; 51°17′45″N 0°34′14″E		1086224	Upload Photo	Q26376286
Headstone to Parkers, 1 Yard East of South Porch of Church of St Marting of Tours	II	The Street			20 July 1984	TQ7919958150; 51°17′39″N 0°34′08″E		1186102	Upload Photo	Q96090779
Holly Cottage	II	1, 2 and 3, The Street			20 July 1984	TQ7927958259; 51°17′43″N 0°34′12″E		1086226	Upload Photo	Q26376291
K6 Telephone Kiosk	II	The Street			17 February 1989	TQ7929158226; 51°17′42″N 0°34′13″E		1254141	Upload Photo	Q26545826
Table Tomb Circa 12 Yards South of Church of St Martin of Tours	II	The Street			20 July 1984	TQ7919958138; 51°17′39″N 0°34′08″E		1336273	Upload Photo	Q96090778
The Cock Horse Public House and Cottage Adjoining to North West	II	The Street			20 July 1984	TQ7930558365; 51°17′46″N 0°34′14″E		1086185	The Cock Horse Public House and Cottage Adjoining to North West More images	Q26376111
The Homestead	II	36 and 38, The Street			26 April 1968	TQ7931458311; 51°17′44″N 0°34′14″E		1186067	Upload Photo	Q26481340
Vine House	II	The Street			20 July 1984	TQ7929158341; 51°17′45″N 0°34′13″E		1336274	Upload Photo	Q26620781
Well Cottage	II	The Street			20 July 1984	TQ7929258353; 51°17′46″N 0°34′13″E		1086184	Upload Photo	Q26376105
West Court	II	The Street			26 April 1968	TQ7925858222; 51°17′42″N 0°34′11″E		1186134	Upload Photo	Q26481407

== See also ==
- Grade I listed buildings in Kent
- Grade II* listed buildings in Kent

== Sources ==
- Newman, John (2012) [1969], Kent: West and the Weald, The Buildings of England, New Haven and London: Yale University Press, ISBN 978-0-300-18509-6
