= Kent Showground =

Coordinates: 51°18.1′N 0°35′E

The Kent Showground, formerly (and still colloquially) known as the Kent County Showground is an area of land in Detling, Kent, England, north of the county town of Maidstone. Stretching along the north side of the A249 from the top of Detling Hill on land that formerly comprised RAF Detling, it is home to the Kent County Agricultural Society which hosts the venue's best-known event, the Kent County Show, each July. However the venue also hosts many other fairs, conferences and events throughout the year. The site covers over 200 acres (0.81 km^{2}) and has been an event site for over 50 years.
