= Daphne Pearson =

Women's Auxiliary Air Force officer during WWII (1911–2000)

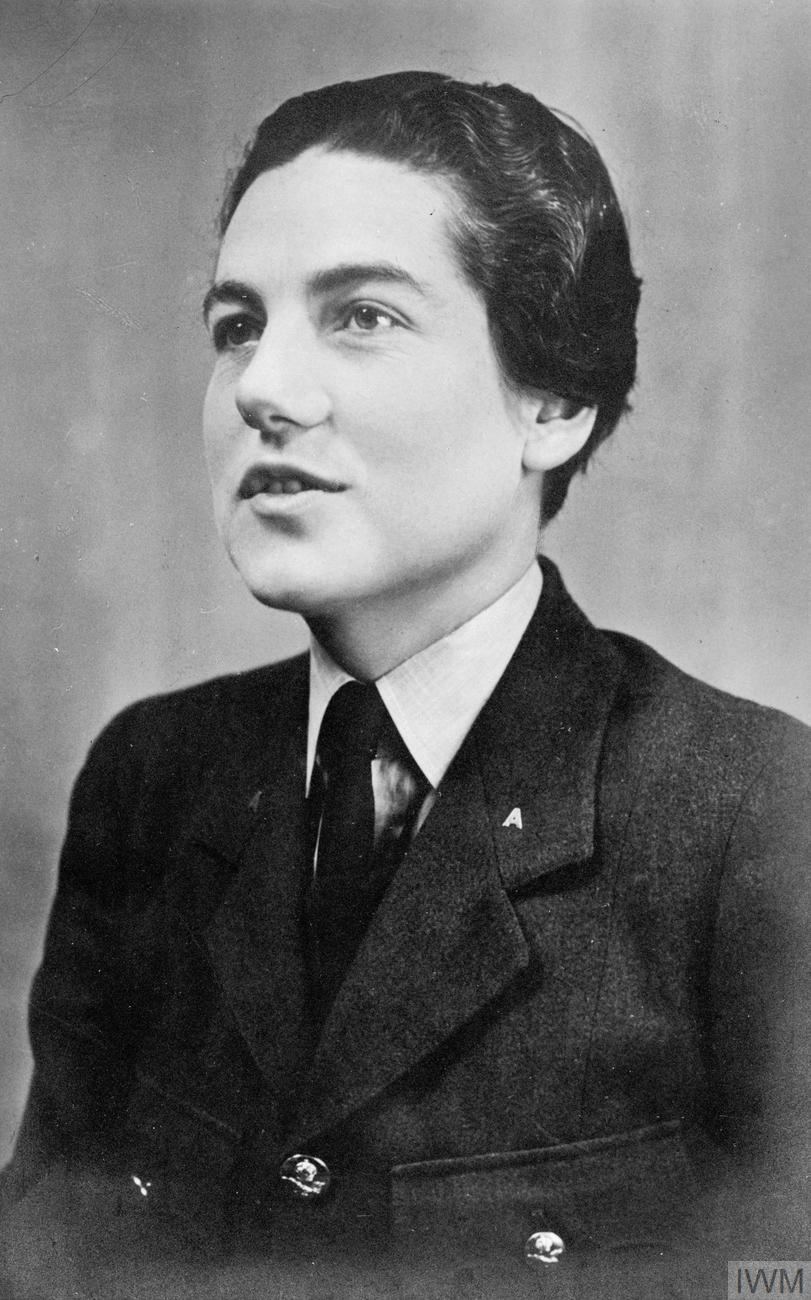
- Born: 25 May 1911; Christchurch, Hampshire, England
- Died: 25 July 2000 (aged 89); Melbourne, Victoria, Australia
- Military career
- Allegiance: United Kingdom
- Branch: Women's Auxiliary Air Force
- Service years: 1939–1946
- Rank: Section Officer
- Service number: 880538
- Conflicts: Second World War
- Awards: George Cross

Joan Daphne Mary Pearson, GC (25 May 1911 – 25 July 2000) was a Women's Auxiliary Air Force officer during the Second World War and one of only thirteen female recipients of the George Cross, the highest decoration for gallantry not in the face of an enemy that can, or could, be awarded to a citizen of the United Kingdom or the Commonwealth.

== Early life ==
Joan Daphne Mary Pearson was born at Christchurch, near Bournemouth. When her father was appointed as vicar of a parish in St Helens, Isle of Wight, her family moved there, to a house facing France across the English Channel. She later said that was the first time in her life she considered joining the Royal Navy. She boarded at St Brandon's School, Bristol, away from her parents who lived in the parishes her father looked after. After leaving school, she worked as a photographer and photographic assistant, with her own studio, before giving it up because of ill health. She then had a variety of jobs while learning to fly in her spare time.

== Second World War ==
Pearson joined the Women's Auxiliary Air Force (WAAF) as a medical orderly shortly after the outbreak of the Second World War in 1939.

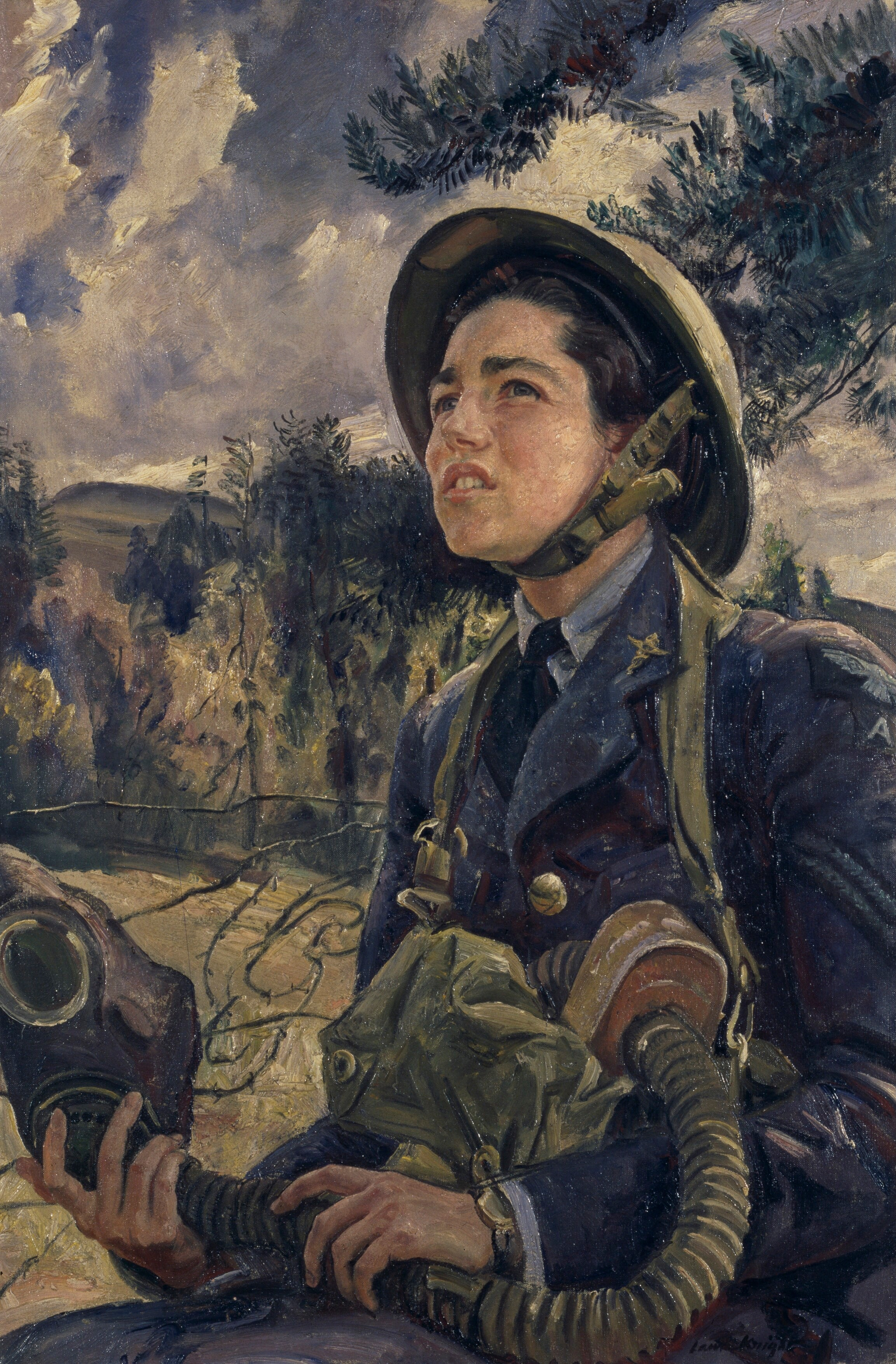
Corporal J. D. M. Pearson, GC, WAAF by Laura Knight (1940)

In the early hours of the morning on 31 May 1940, Avro Anson bomber R3389 (MK-W) of No. 500 Squadron RAF undershot on approach to an airstrip near the WAAF quarters in Detling, Kent, crashing into a field. Upon landing, a bomb exploded, killing the navigator instantly, and leaving the pilot seriously injured. Corporal Pearson entered the burning fuselage, released the pilot from his harness and removed him from the immediate area around the aircraft. After she was 27 metres (30 yards) from the aircraft, a bomb exploded. She flung herself on top of the pilot to protect him. After medical staff had removed the pilot, she went back to the plane to look for the fourth crew member, the radio operator. She found him dead. For her deeds, Pearson was awarded the Empire Gallantry Medal (EGM). The full citation for the award was published in the London Gazette on 19 July 1940 and reads:

CENTRAL CHANCERY OF THE ORDERS OF KNIGHTHOOD - St. James's Palace, S.W.1. 19th July 1940.

The KING has been graciously pleased to approve the following Awards: The Medal of the Military Division of the Most Excellent Order of the British Empire, for Gallantry:—

880538 Corporal (now Assistant Section Officer) Joan Daphne Mary Pearson, Women's Auxiliary Air Force

On 31 May 1940, an hour after midnight, an aircraft crashed near the Women's Auxiliary Air Force quarters at Detling in Kent, the pilot being seriously injured, another officer killed outright and two airmen slightly injured. Upon hearing the crash Corporal Pearson rushed out and, although she knew there were bombs on board, she stood on the wreckage, roused the pilot who was stunned, released his parachute harness and helped him to get clear. When she got him about 30 yards from the wreckage, a 120 lb bomb went off and Corporal Pearson threw herself on top of the pilot to protect him from the blast and splinters. She remained with him until a stretcher party arrived and then returned to the burning aircraft to look for the fourth member of the crew. She found him - the wireless operator - dead in the bomber. Her prompt and courageous action undoubtedly helped to save the pilot's life.

After the revocation of the EGM, King George VI invested Pearson on 31 January 1941 with its replacement, the George Cross. Four women became GC recipients overnight as they held the EGM. However, Pearson may have been the first woman to be invested with the new award. A portrait of Pearson at the time of the incident was commissioned and painted by the artist Laura Knight. Several weeks after the incident, Pearson was commissioned as an officer in the WAAF and served in RAF Bomber Command until the end of the war, working mainly as a recruiter.

== Later life ==
After demobilisation in 1946, Pearson became the assistant governor of a women's Borstal. She later worked at the Royal Botanical Gardens, Kew and owned a shop in Kew, selling gardening equipment, produce and flowers.

Pearson visited Australia in November 1969, on the first flight of the Comet IV on the Heathrow to Darwin route. She decided to emigrate there, working in the Victoria region as a horticulturist, first at the Department of Agriculture and later at the Commonwealth Department of Civil Aviation. She attended reunions of the Victoria Cross and George Cross Association until her late eighties.

Pearson's attendance of a meeting of the Victoria Cross and George Cross Association led to a report about her in a Sunday newspaper in 1995, and eventually to her meeting the family of the pilot whose life she had saved, after his son recognised the circumstances surrounding his rescue. The pilot was David Bond who went on to found Bond helicopters and died in 1977.

Pearson died on 25 July 2000, aged 89, in Melbourne, Australia. She was interred in "The Garden of No Distant Place" located in the grounds of Springvale Cemetery, in south-east Melbourne.

== Affiliations ==
Pearson was a member of the Victoria Cross and George Cross Association (London), Australian Red Cross Society (Victorian Division), Women's Royal Air Force Officers Association (UK), she was a Life Member of the Royal Air Forces Association (UK) and Honorary Life Member of the Returned Services League (RSL), Royal Air Force Club (UK) and the Royal British Legion (UK).
