= St Nicholas Cole Abbey =

Coordinates: 51°30′43″N 0°5′48″W

- Church of Saint Nicholas Cole Abbey
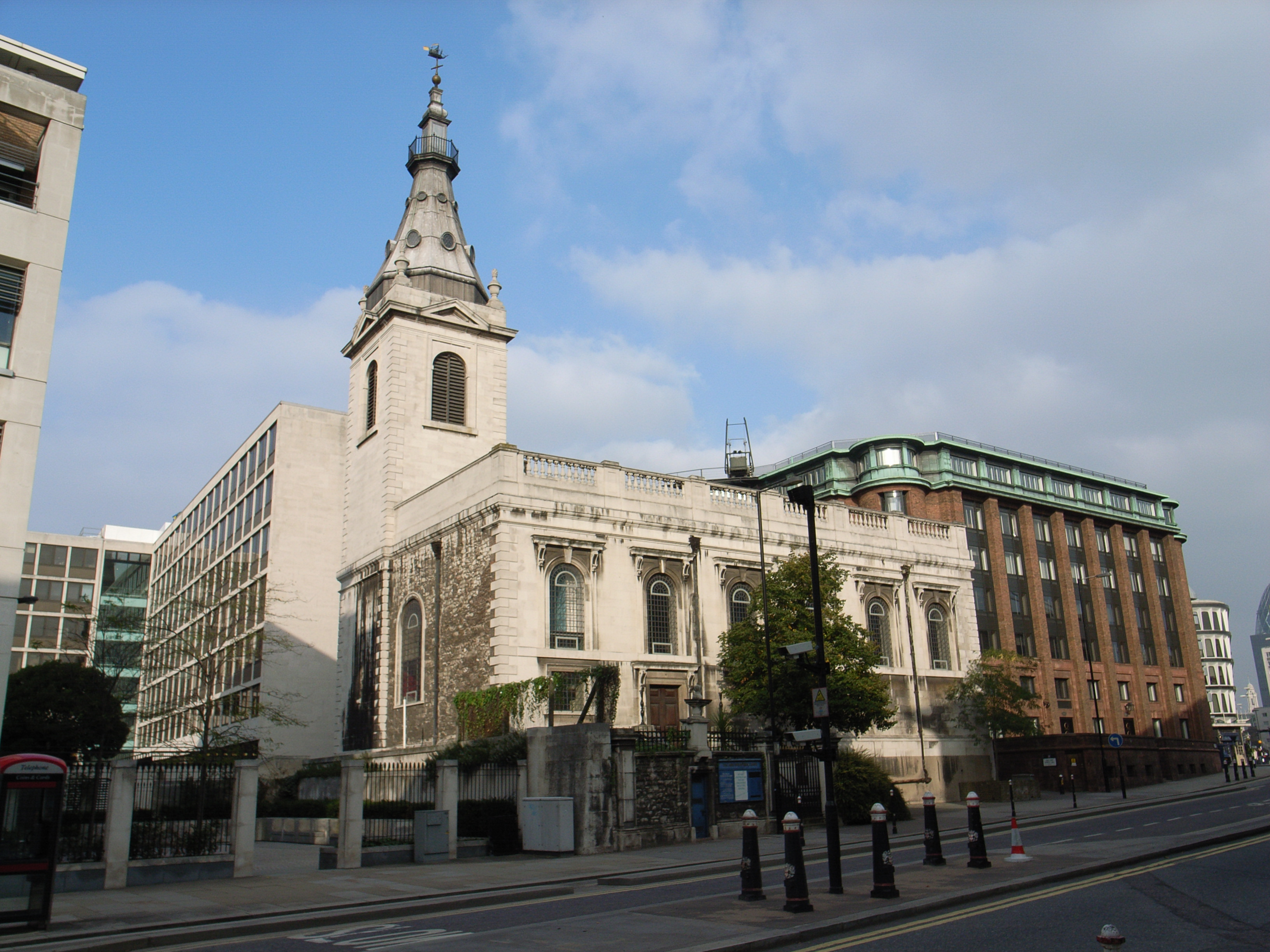

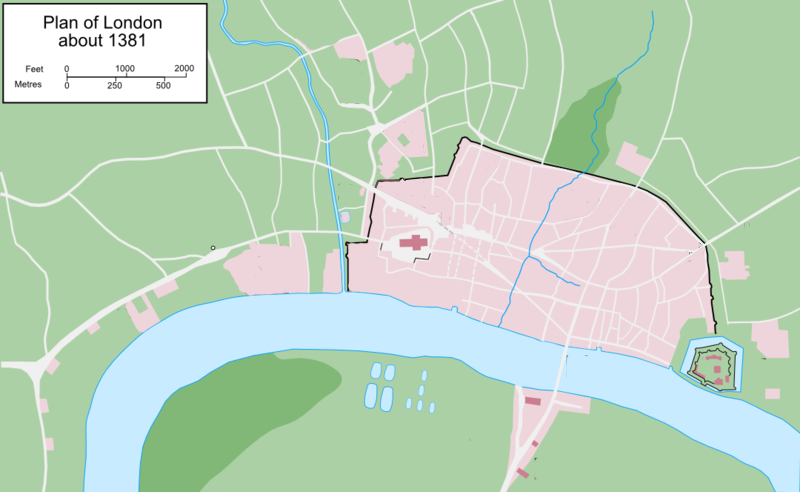
- Location within City of London Location within City of London in 1300
- OS grid reference: TQ 32161 80959
- Location: 114 Queen Victoria Street, London, EC4
- Country: England
- Language: English
- Denomination: Church of England
- Previous denomination: Roman Catholic (to 1538); Free Church of Scotland (1982–2003)
- Churchmanship: Conservative evangelical
- Website: www.stnicholascenter.org/gazetteer/547

History
- Founded: Before 1144
- Dedication: Nicholas of Myra

Architecture
- Architect: Sir Christopher Wren
- Style: English Baroque

Administration
- Diocese: London

St Nicholas Cole Abbey is a church in the City of London located on what is now Queen Victoria Street. Recorded from the twelfth century, the church was destroyed in the Great Fire of London in 1666 and rebuilt by the office of Sir Christopher Wren. The church suffered substantial bomb damage from German bombs during the London Blitz in the Second World War and was reconstructed by Arthur Bailey in 1961–62.

== History ==
The church is dedicated to the 4th-century Saint Nicholas of Myra. The name "Cole Abbey" is derived from "coldharbour", a medieval word for a traveller's shelter or shelter from the cold. The church was never an abbey. The earliest reference to the church is in a letter of Pope Lucius II in 1144–5.

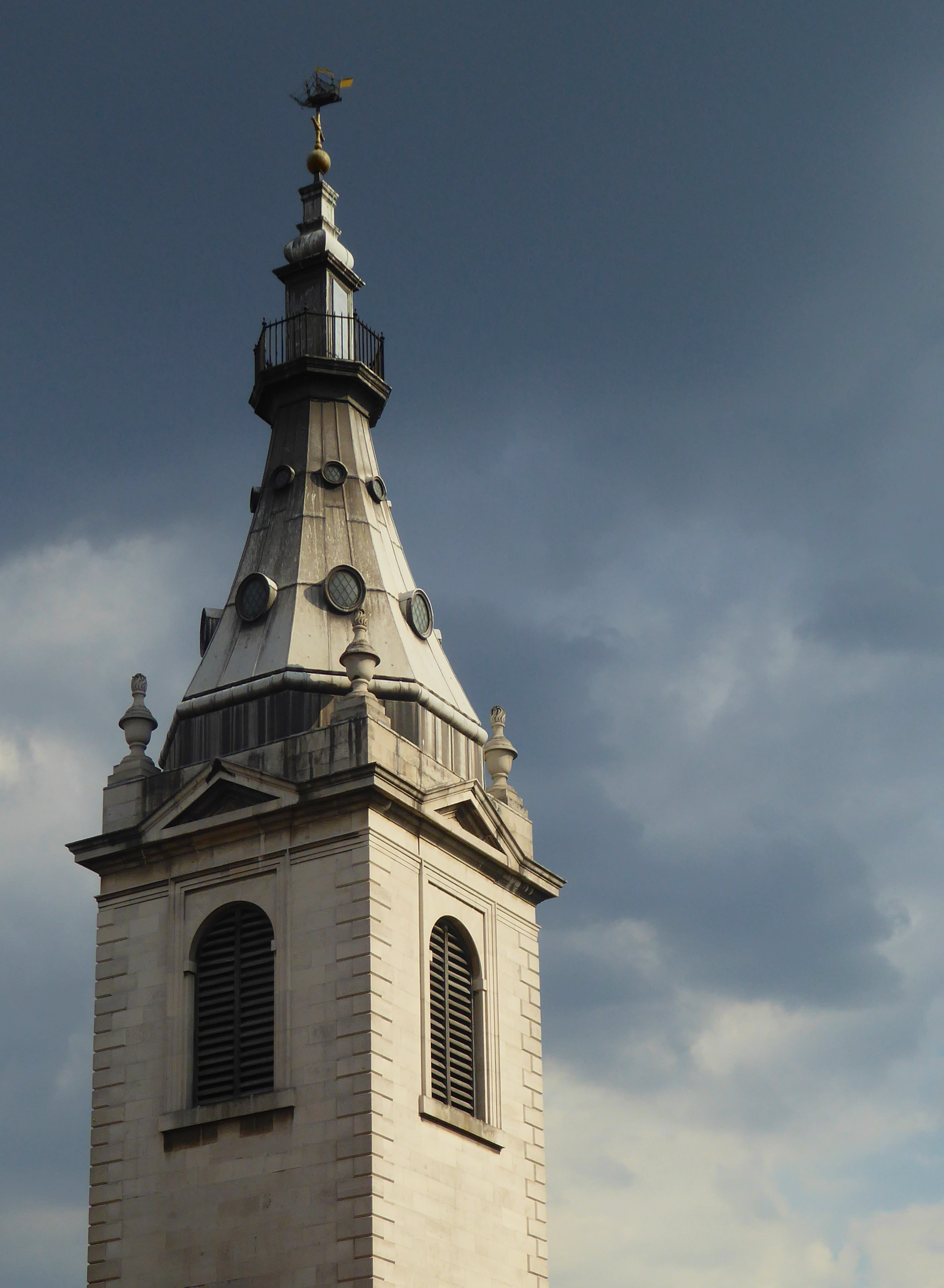
The spire

Saint Nicholas of Myra is patron saint of, among other groups, children and fishermen, and the church has special ties with both. An inventory of the church's possessions taken at the time of the Protestant Reformation includes vestments for children, suggesting that the church maintained the tradition of electing a boy bishop on Saint Nicholas Day. Deeds in the reign of Richard the Lionheart refer to a new fish market near St Nicholas Cole Abbey. In a Charter of 1272, the church is referred to as "St Nick's behind Fish Street". During the 16th century, several fishmongers were buried here and John Stow records that, during the reign of Elizabeth I, a lead and stone cistern, fed by the Thames, was set up against the north wall "for the care and commodity of the Fishmongers in and about Old Fish Street".

Like all English churches, St Nicholas Cole Abbey became Protestant during the Reformation. Upon the accession of Queen Mary I, it was the first church to celebrate Mass (on 23 August 1553). The incumbent rector, Thomas Sowdley, had obtained a licence to marry during the reign of Edward VI and was deprived of his living as a result. In the same month as the coronation of Mary I, John Strype recorded "Another priest called sir Tho. Snowdel, [i.e. Sowdley] whom they nicknamed 'Parson Chicken', was carted through Cheapside, for assoiling an old acquaintance of his in a ditch in Finsbury field; and was at that riding saluted with chamber-pots and rotten eggs". Sowdley regained his living on the accession of Elizabeth I.

A century later, the living of St Nicholas Cole Abbey was owned by Colonel Francis Hacker, a Puritan who commanded the execution detail of Charles I.

The church was destroyed in the Great Fire. Charles II promised the site to the Lutheran community but lobbying prevented this from being granted and the parish was combined with that of St Nicholas Olave, a nearby church also destroyed but not rebuilt. The church was rebuilt between 1672 and 1678 at a cost of £5042. Included in the building accounts are the items "Dinner for Dr Wren and other Company – £2 14s 0d" and "Half a pint of canary for Dr Wren's coachmen – 6d". It was the first church of the fifty-one lost in the Great Fire to be rebuilt.

In 1737, the early Methodist leader George Whitefield preached a sermon on "Profane swearing in church" at St Nicholas Cole Abbey.

The post-Fire church was built with its façade to the north on what was then Fish Street (and what is now Distaff Lane) and the east on Old Fish Street Hill. Victorian urban redevelopment changed the local street plan and the south wall of the church, instead of being hemmed in by buildings, now overlooked the newly built Queen Victoria Street. This necessitated a reordering of the church, in 1874, with windows being opened up to the south and the main doorway moving from the northwest tower to the south.

Smoke generated by underground trains so blackened the exterior that in the late 19th century, the church became known as "St Nicholas Cole Hole Abbey".

In May 1881, church attendance under the Reverend Henry Stebbing was down to one man and one woman. Then, in 1883, Henry Cary Shuttleworth was appointed rector, a position he held until 1900. Shuttleworth was a Christian Socialist who installed a bar, established a prodigious musical programme and made the church a centre for debate. This had an effect, as by 1891 St Nicholas Cole Abbey had the largest congregation of any City church, numbering up to 450 worshippers on a Sunday evening. A contemporary vicar commented: "In St. Nicholas Cole Abbey there is good preaching and divine worship is also carried out in the most reverential manner. In other City churches ... as a rule, they [the rectors] are themselves the most wretched preachers and bad readers."

On 10 May 1941, London suffered its worst air raid during the entire Second World War, with 1,436 people killed and several major buildings destroyed or severely damaged. Among them was St Nicholas Cole Abbey. The church remained a shell until restored under Arthur Bailey and reconsecrated in 1962.

=== Recent history ===
The parish was combined with that of St Andrew-by-the-Wardrobe. St Nicholas Cole Abbey became the headquarters of the Diocesan Council for Mission and Unity. Between 1982 and 2003, the church was leased to the Free Church of Scotland (Presbyterian).

In 2006, the Church of England announced that St Nicholas Cole Abbey would become a national centre for Religious Education: the Culham Institute, a Church of England educational body which promotes and develops RE in schools, would move its headquarters to St Nicholas Cole Abbey from Oxford. This did not come to pass.

In 2014, the building reopened as the home of the St Nicholas Cole Abbey Centre for Workplace Ministry, with a supporting cafe known as The Wren.

=== Present day ===
In November 2016, Sunday services re-started, alongside midweek meetings, under the name St Nick's Church.

The parish is within the conservative evangelical tradition of the Church of England, and it has passed resolutions to reject the ordination of women and/or female leadership.

In November 2022, St. Nicholas announced that it was making a "visible differentiation" from the Church of England's House of Bishops, in protest at the bishops' engagement with the Living in Love and Faith process which considered the possibility of blessing same-sex sexual relationships. In March 2023, after the church's General Synod approved the principle of blessings for same-sex couples, the Senior Minister of St Nicholas, along with the guild vicar of St Botolph's, Aldersgate, announced they had established a new "deanery chapter", separate from the official diocesan structures, for clergy who felt "compelled to resist all episcopal leadership from the House of Bishops". This move was described by the Diocese of London as a "unilateral move" with "no legal substance", and by the Church Times as "schismatic".

== Architecture ==
The church was designated a Grade I listed building on 4 January 1950.

=== Exterior ===
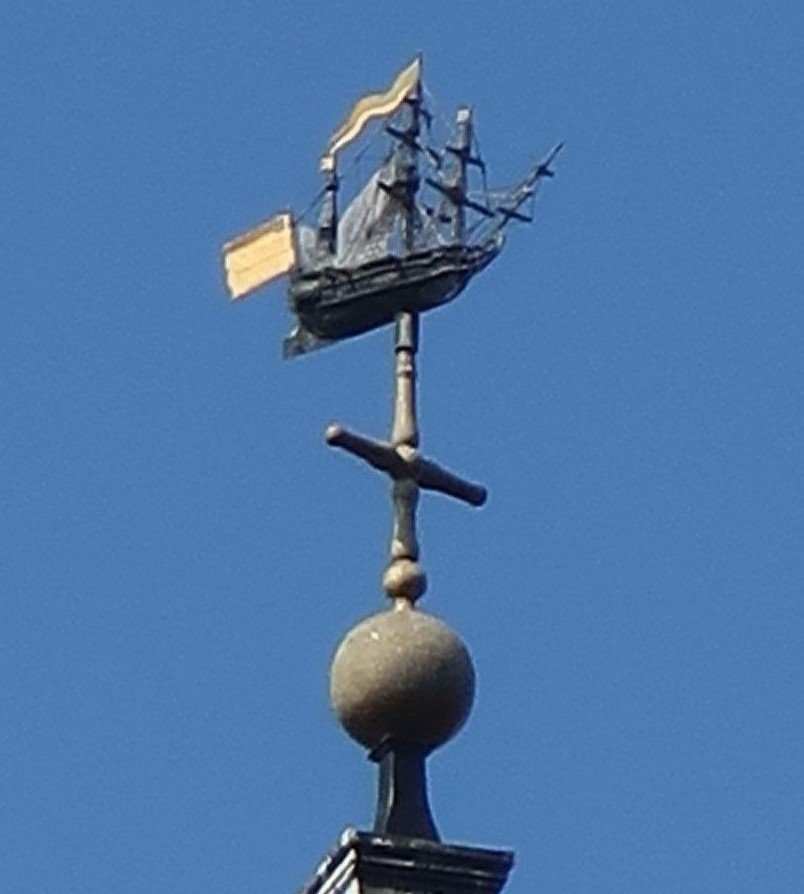
Weathervane

The church is a stone box with quoins. Some medieval work remains in the south and west walls, the latter of which is of brick and rubble. On top of the body of the church is a balustrade. The windows are arched with square brackets – a favourite device of Wren.

On the northwestern corner of the church is a square tower surmounted by a lead spire in the shape of an upside down octagonal trumpet. On each corner of the tower is a small flaming urn. The spire has two rows of lunettes and a small balcony near the top, resembling a crow's nest. At the very top is a vane in the shape of a three-masted barque in the round. This came from St Michael Queenhithe (demolished 1876), and was added to the spire in 1962. The pre-War vane was in the shape of a pennant with 4 "S" shapes back to back.

The tower is 135 feet (41 m) tall and contains one bell.

=== Interior ===
The east wall is dominated by three stained glass windows designed by Keith New, who also helped design the stained glass windows of Coventry Cathedral. They are reminiscent of the work of Marc Chagall. They replace windows designed by Edward Burne-Jones which were destroyed in 1941. From left to right they depict St Nicholas Cole Abbey as the centre of the world with crosses pointing to the four corners of the world; the Rock of Christ with the ark (representing the church) on four rivers (representing the Gospels); seven lamps, representing the extension of the church around the world.

Swags have been recreated over the east windows. The interior is otherwise plain, other than Corinthian pilasters. In the vestry to the north west is crazy paving made from shattered tombstones.

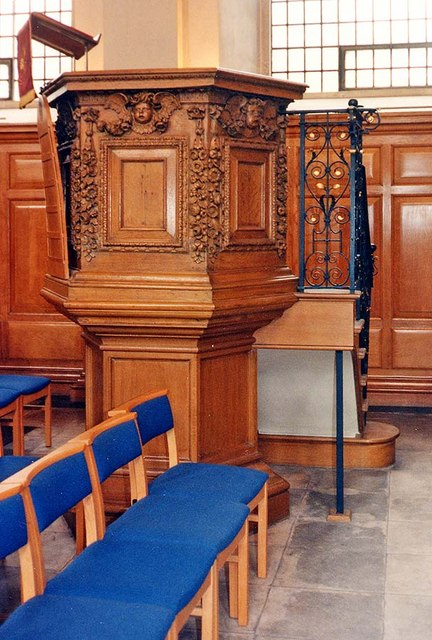
Pulpit

Surviving from the 17th century are the carved pulpit, (although on a modern base and lacking its tester), the font cover, part of the communion rail, parts of the original Wren era reredos, now installed on the south wall and the Charles II coat of arms.

Behind a panel near the south door is a medieval stone head found during the restoration.

The organ was built by Noel Mander for the restored church.

In 2006, as part of a planned redevelopment of the church as a centre for Religious Education, it was announced that a free-standing glass box would be built inside the shell of the church. This redevelopment did not come to pass.

== Services and other activities ==
St Nick's Church meets each Sunday at 11 am. Services are contemporary in style and there are Sunday clubs and a crèche for youth and children. Before the service, coffee and pastries are served from 10:30 and there is an informal lunch afterwards.

Small groups are held on Wednesday evenings, at 6:15 pm for a meal and 7 pm for bible study and prayer. St Nick's Talks run every Thursday lunchtime at 1:05 pm. The aim of the talks is to explain, from the Bible, the good news of Jesus Christ to those working nearby.

== St Nicholas Cole Abbey in culture ==
- Henry Shuttleworth is the model for James Morrell, the Socialist preacher in George Bernard Shaw's 1898 play Candida.
- The gutted shell of St Nicholas Cole Abbey is the scene of the gold bullion heist in the 1951 Ealing comedy The Lavender Hill Mob.
- The church features in Iris Murdoch's first novel Under the Net, published in 1954.
- St Nicholas Cole Abbey was used as a location in 1968 Doctor Who serial The Invasion.

== See also ==
- List of churches and cathedrals of London
- List of Christopher Wren churches in London
