= Mayo Echo =

Newspaper

- Type: Weekly newspaper
- Format: Tabloid
- Owner: We Shout Loudest Limited
- Editor: Tony Geraghty
- Founded: 2004
- Headquarters: Castlebar, County Mayo
- Website: www.mayoecho.com

The Mayo Echo was a controversial, free, weekly tabloid newspaper circulated in County Mayo, Ireland during the 2000s. The paper was first published in 2004 and closed in April 2009.

== Circulation ==
The newspaper claimed to have one of the largest distributions of the 'five county' newspapers, "eventually reaching more than 24,000 copies every week." (from page 2 of the last online edition - edition 221, 15 April 2009). The paper was delivered door-to-door in Ballina, Castlebar, Westport and Claremorris and was also published online every week in PDF format.

== Style ==
The newspaper formed a reputation for tackling controversial subjects using blunt language, and publishing articles criticising what it considered to be examples of corruption or malpractice in local government and other local organisations - in fact, the last online issue had an apology on the front cover relating to an earlier story (dated 30 April 2008) alleging that a local councillor acted improperly when handling planning matters relating to business premises.

As might have been expected, the relationship between the Mayo Echo and the local Mayo County Council was not amicable, and, in the last online edition, editor Tony Geraghty stated that there had been a three-year boycott of the paper by the Council. It is understood that the Mayo Echo was not available in the Mayo County Library and the Council operated an advertising boycott.

A Mayo Echo piece which claimed that hundreds of people would be relocated from troubled housing estates in Limerick to Mayo was described as "off the wall".

== Lough Lannagh article, May 2008 ==
In May 2008, the Mayo Echo published an article about alleged gay activity at a local beauty spot in the town of Castlebar. The article sparked hot debate in the local and national press, on national radio and online forums - mainly over its association of the word "pervert" with homosexuality, and the fact that photographs were printed of one person allegedly involved, with their vehicle number plate clearly visible.

Tony Geraghty, editor of the Mayo Echo, objected to some comments about the original article published on the regional bulletin board at http://www.castlebar.ie/. He contacted the website requesting that the comments be removed and that an apology be published. An apology was published and the comments were removed, but new comments appeared, including one allegedly threatening to burn the Mayo Echo's offices into the ground. Geraghty then issued a threat of legal action against the website and, as a result, the entire site was removed by the site managers and replaced with a commentary on the events. Geraghty then demanded a list of the names of all the site moderators and contributors, but the site managers refused this request. In quick succession, a campaign website was set up (savecastlebarie.org - no longer online), and groups were formed on Facebook and Myspace. Eventually, Geraghty dropped his threat of legal action and the full website at http://www.castlebar.ie/ returned shortly afterwards.
