= The Blue Mountain Echo =

1909–1939 newspaper in Australia

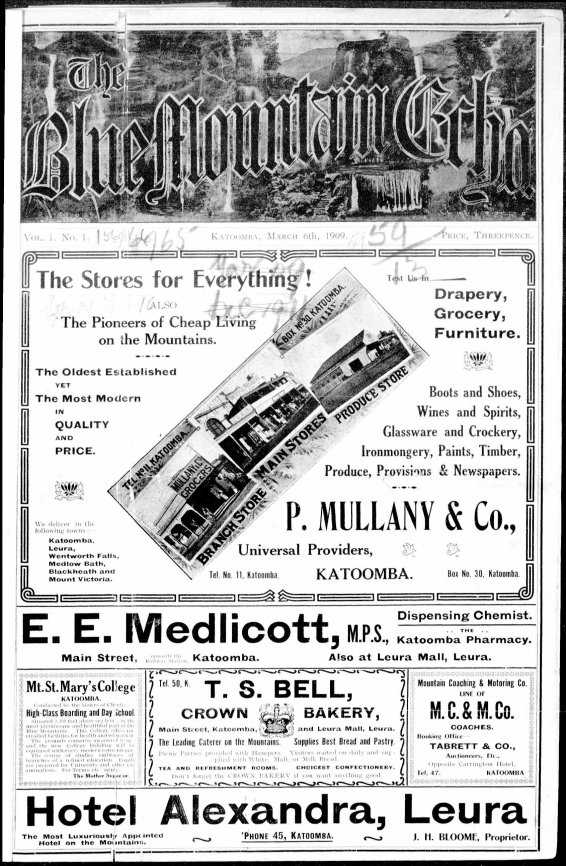
Front page of The Blue Mountain Echo newspaper on 6 March 1909.

The Blue Mountain Echo, also published as The Blue Mountain Star, The Katoomba Daily, The Blue Mountains Daily, and The Blue Mountains Echo was a semi-weekly English language newspaper published in Katoomba, New South Wales, Australia.

== History ==
The paper, published from 1909-1939, changed names several times in its history.

Title	Dates
The Blue Mountain Echo	1909-1928
The Blue Mountain Star	1929-1932
The Katoomba daily	1920-1939
The Blue Mountains Daily	1939
The Blue Mountains Echo	1939

The paper was initially published under the management of James C. Hart of Mountaineer Printing and Publishing Company. Following his retirement, Robert Villiers Smythe took over management and remained with the paper as editor until November 1928. With new management came a change of name, as the paper was published from 1929 as The Blue Mountain Star.

The Blue Mountain Star was edited by Victor Yeoman Mathias during its brief publication history, before it was absorbed into the Katoomba Daily in 1932. First published in 1920, in its early years the Katoomba Daily had been printed and published by Robert Clyde Packer before printing moved to Katoomba in 1924. Other editors included Austin Mays, Sydney Lochlan Ward and Edmund Joseph Collins.

The paper changed name twice in 1939, first to the Blue Mountains Daily in February and then in May to the Blue Mountains Echo, which ceased publication shortly afterwards.

== Digitisation ==
The Blue Mountain Echo has been digitised as part of the Australian Newspapers Digitisation Program project of the National Library of Australia.

== See also ==
- List of newspapers in New South Wales
- List of newspapers in Australia
