= Holy Trinity Woolwich =

Former church in Woolwich, England

Coordinates: 51°29′31.6″N 0°4′7.4″E

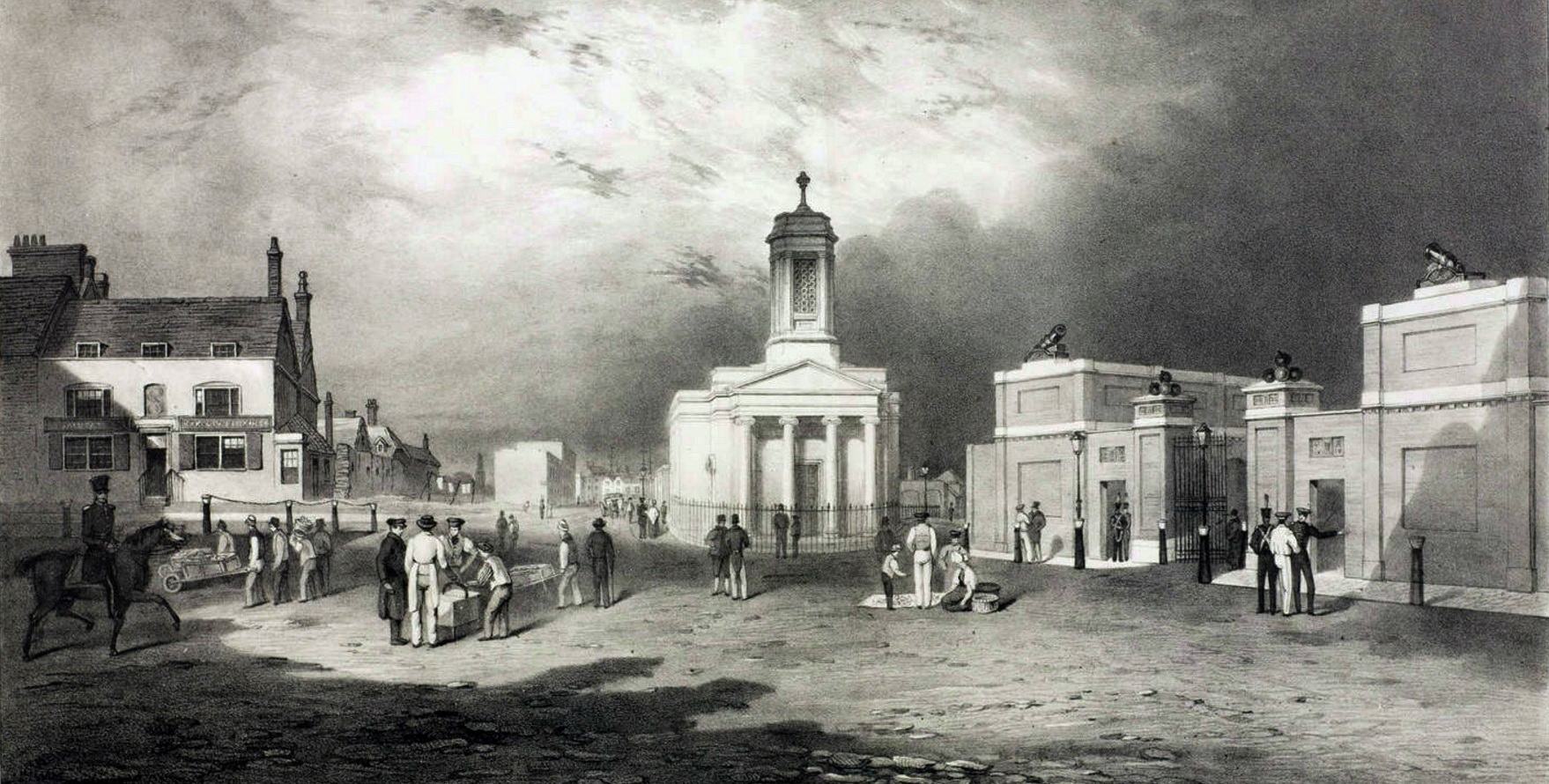
View from the east of Beresford Square in Woolwich around 1835, with Holy Trinity at centre and Beresford Gate at right.

Holy Trinity was a Church of England church on the corner of Ropeyard Rails, Beresford Street and Beresford Square in Woolwich. It was built in 1833 as a proprietary chapel. It later became a chapel of ease to St Mary Magdalene Woolwich to designs by John Douglas Hopkins. It was given its own parish from 1881 to 1953 before this was merged back into that of Saint Mary Magdalene. Its Ionic portico was removed to make room for tram queues in 1930-1931. The rest of the church closed in 1960 (with its parish merged back into St Mary Magdalene's) and was later demolished.
