= Cavan Echo =

Newspaper

The Cavan Echo is a newspaper based on College Street in the Irish town of Cavan, and has currently a circulation of 17,500 that serves all of County Cavan. The Cavan Echo is the only Irish-owned paper in County Cavan. It covers news, sport, entertainments, features and community news. It is tabloid in format, but not in style and is a free newspaper. Its sister paper, Monaghan Echo, began on 16 February 2007.

== Sources ==
- Cavan Echo owners look to expand
- Cavan Echo launch
