= St Martin of Tours Church, Detling =

Coordinates: 51.29436°N 0.568778°E

St Martin of Tours Church
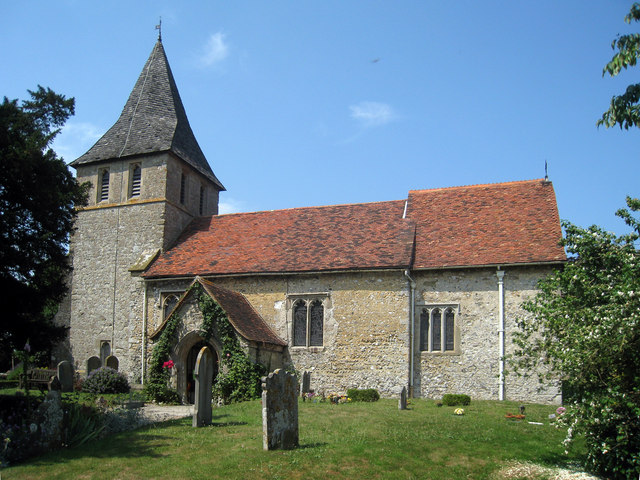
- Church from the south-east

- Location within Kent
- OS grid reference: TQ 79196 58159
- Location: Detling, Kent
- Country: England
- Denomination: Anglican
- Website: Detling Church

History
- Status: Parish church

Architecture
- Functional status: Active
- Heritage designation: Grade I
- Designated: 26 April 1968
- Style: Early Norman/ Perpendicular Gothic
- Completed: c. 1100, 13th and 15th centuries

Specifications
- Materials: Rag-stone, Flint

Administration
- Province: Canterbury
- Diocese: Canterbury
- Archdeaconry: Maidstone
- Deanery: North Downs
- Parish: St Martin of Tours Church, Detling

St Martin of Tours is a parish church in Detling, Kent. Dedicated to Martin of Tours, the building was constructed in the 12th century with 13th and 15th-century additions and restoration carried out in the late 19th century. It is a Grade I listed building.

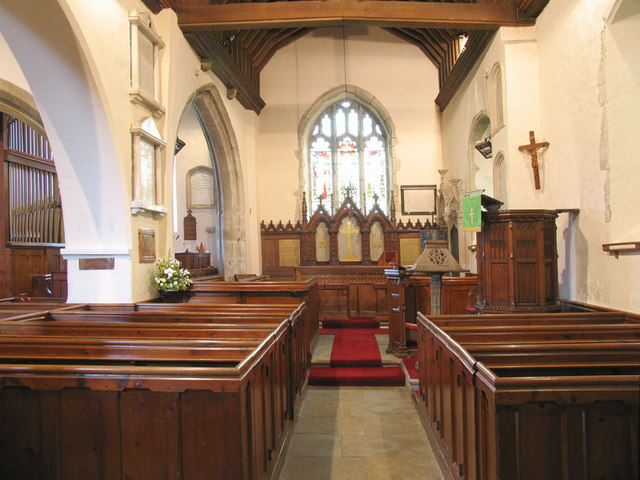
Nave looking towards the chancel and the east end

The nave and chancel are of early Norman construction and built of flint with a plain tiled roof. The aisle to the north of the nave is Early English and is constructed of flint and local rag-stone. It was enlarged in the 1880s. The adjacent chapel on the north side of the chancel and the porch on the south side of the nave are Perpendicular Gothic. The tower is built in two stages of galletted rag-stone with diagonal corner buttresses. The timber-shingled broach spire was added in 1861 by R. C. Hussey. The roof structure to the chapel is original, but the rest of the roof was replaced in the 19th century.

The church windows are of varying sizes and periods although mostly perpendicular in style. Over the doorway on the west side of the tower is a large rectangular three-lighted perpendicular window added in the 19th century. The windows to the nave, aisle and chapel are mainly two-lighted in design. Those to the south-east and east of the chancel and three-lighted. Internally, the nave and aisle are separated by a pair of wide plain arches and the chancel and chapel by a single arch.

The large twelve-sided font is early and plain and stands on a 20th-century base, having once been built into the wall of the tower. An ornately carved four-sided oak lectern dates from 1340–50. It probably came from Boxley Abbey and has been described as "the finest medieval fitting in any parish church in the county". The church's pipe organ dates from the 1850s and was brought from the Congregational Church in Maidstone in 1973, and was installed and to a large part funded by long time organist, Colin Savage, from East Court, Detling.

The churchyard contains a headstone and a table tomb that are Grade II listed.

== See also ==
- Grade I listed buildings in Maidstone
