= Lecturer (clergy) =

Church of England clerical title

In the Church of England, a lecturer is typically a junior or assistant curate serving in a parish. It is a historic title which has fallen out of regular use. Several churches in the UK have clergy identified by the ancient title lecturer, including many London churches, St. Mary's Church, Nottingham and Carlisle Cathedral.
