= Detling =

Village in Kent, England

Coordinates: 51.296°N 0.571°E

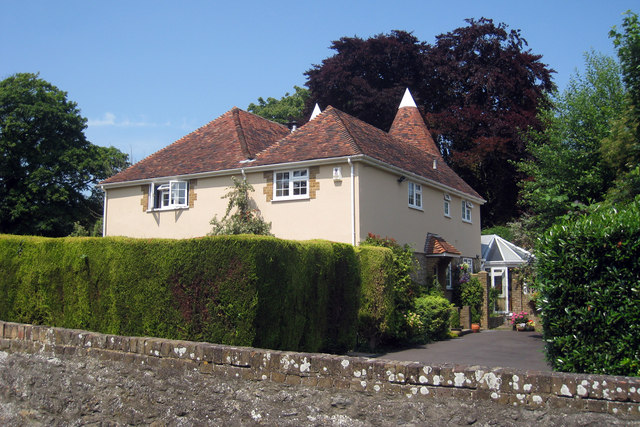
- West Court Oast

- Location within Kent
- Population: 796 (2011 Census)
- OS grid reference: TQ7958
- Civil parish: Detling
- District: Maidstone
- Shire county: Kent
- Region: South East
- Country: England
- Sovereign state: United Kingdom
- Post town: MAIDSTONE
- Postcode district: ME14
- Dialling code: 01622
- Police: Kent
- Fire: Kent
- Ambulance: South East Coast
- UK Parliament: Faversham and Mid Kent

Detling is a village and civil parish in the Borough of Maidstone in Kent, England. The parish is located on the slope of the North Downs, 4 miles (6.4 km) northeast of Maidstone, and on the Pilgrims' Way.

== History and features ==
The Cock Horse Inn was used to stable additional horses when required to take heavily laden coaches and wagons on the steep route up Detling Hill. The village is now bypassed by the A249 road, which opened in 1962. Jade's Crossing, a footbridge to the west of the village, opened in 2002 after a local resident, Jade Hobbs, was killed trying to cross the road.

The Grade I listed village church is dedicated to Martin of Tours.

The former airfield at the top of the hill was a Royal Navy Air Station during World War One, and an RAF station during World War Two. It was bombed by the Luftwaffe several times, with considerable loss of life. Its original area has been divided with some of the original hardstandings being used in a light industrial units area, part of the airfield is now farm land, and a significant part used by the Kent Showground – which hosts several annual events, such as the Kent County Show and the Detling Summer Conference, an event for evangelical Christians. A memorial in Detling Village commemorates the service personnel from the airfield. See RAF Detling for more details.

The village is also home to a Tudor gateway that has stood since the time of Henry VIII.

Detling Cricket Club have a ground on the Pilgrims' Way. They play on Saturdays and Sundays during the summer and hold practice sessions on Tuesday evenings. The team plays in the Kent Village League.

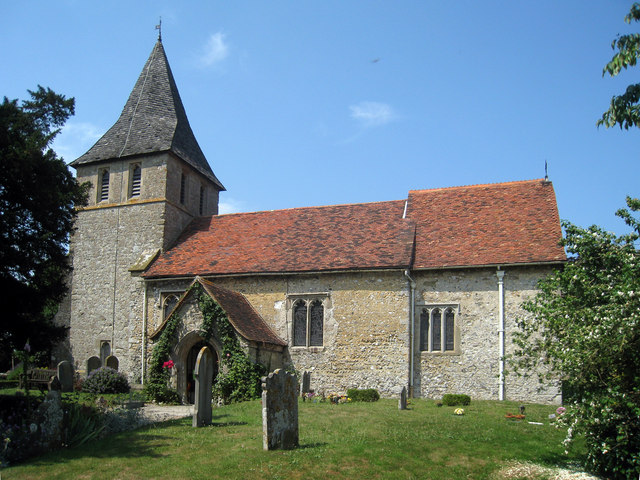
St Martin's Church

== See also ==
- Listed buildings in Detling
