= Tack strip =

Carpeting component

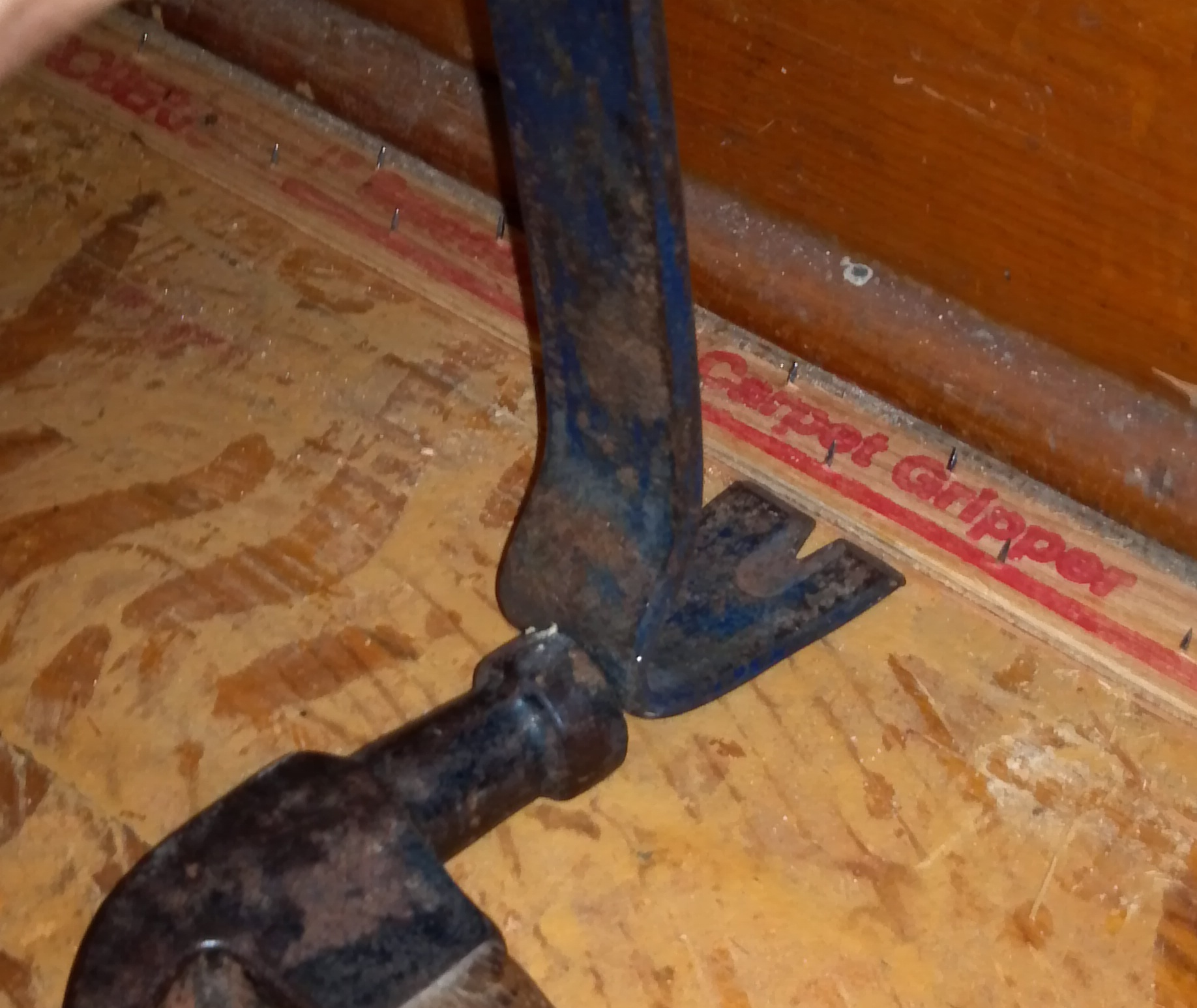
Tack strip being removed from a floor

Tack strip also known as gripper rod, carpet gripper, Smoothedge tackless strip, gripper strip or gripper edge is a thin piece of wood, between 1 and 2 metres (3.3 and 6.6 ft) long and about 3 centimetres (1.2 in) wide, studded with hundreds of sharp nails or tacks used in the installation of carpet. Tack strip is nailed, tack side up, to the perimeter of the area being carpeted to help keep it taut. After the underlay is installed, the carpet is cut to fit, stretched over the area and firmly anchored to the edges of floor by the tack strip. The strip has two functions: to grip the carpet and permanently hold it in place, and to jam the carpet edge into the gap between the tack strip and the wall, giving it a finished look with little effort. This method allows a high quality, long lasting installation to be completed quickly and easily.

Tack strip was invented by Roy Roberts in 1939. This product revolutionized the power stretch method still used today for installing tufted carpet. "Gripper Edge" and "Smoothedge" were original trademarks used by Roy Roberts and his companies.
