= Underlay =

Layer of cushioning material under a carpet or other soft flooring

Underlay may refer to flooring or roofing materials, bed padding, or a musical notation.

== Flooring ==
Underlay or underlayment generally refers to a layer of cushioning made of materials such as sponge rubber, foam, felt, crumb rubber, or recycled plastic; this material is laid beneath carpeting to provide comfort underfoot, to reduce wear on the carpet, and to provide insulation against sound, moisture, and heat. In general, it is a layer which is underneath another layer, so underlay is thus also used to describe many different surface-covering products.

In vinyl flooring or "linoleum", the underlay is the thin layer of plywood that is fastened over the structural subfloor to create a uniform, smooth platform for the sheet vinyl. For laminated wood flooring, the underlay provides a “vapor barrier” to prevent moisture from coming through the floor of the home and then migrating into the flooring; the underlayment may also have noise-dampening properties.

A self-leveling underlay is a concrete product that can be pumped in liquid form onto the floor in order to create a level floor.

=== Carpet Underlay ===
Popular carpet underlays are

- pu foam
- crumb rubber
- felt
- cork

More recent innovations in underlay materials include recycled plastic underlay, which can be made from plastic bottles and other single-use plastics for reduced environmental impact.

Carpet underlays are typically 6-12 mm thick. They primarily provide foot comfort, but they also reduce carpet wear and provide sound and thermal insulation.

=== Underfloor Heating Underlay ===
Underlays are also available for underfloor heating in either central heating pipes or electric applications which allow the heat to transmit through the underlay and carpet. Specialist underlays include ThermalStream which have air perforated holes to allow a faster heat transaction.

=== Wood floor ===
Underlay for timber floors is typically 3mm closed cell plastic foam. This primarily provides sound insulation and a vapour barrier.
A watertight vapour barrier should only be used though, when neither condensation from humid air coming from beneath nor water spillage coming from above are to be expected. Especially if there is spillage it will otherwise take a much longer time for the moisture to disperse and evaporate if it is prevented by the barrier from seeping through the wooden flooring. This might make it necessary to raise the temperature of the floor to facilitate evaporation and prevent rot.

== Roofing ==
Underlay is also the term for the material under roofing tiles; this roofing membrane is often made of rubber and is used to seal the roof and prevent leakage. Underlayment used with roofing shingles provides a second layer of water proofing to prevent leaks and is called tar paper, roofing felt, or since the 1990s synthetic underlayment. Roofing underlays can be breathable or non-breathable depending on the ventilation requirements of the building.

== Bedding ==
Bedding underlay (or mattress overlay) is a thick, extra layer of padding between the bed mattress and bedding. Underlays are designed to increase comfort and support, while extending the life of the mattress (or mattress protector). Common underlay materials include: Wool, foam, and latex.

== Music ==
In music, underlay refers to text intended for vocalization – positioned either directly or indirectly under notes on a musical staff.
