= Solva (disambiguation) =

Solva may refer to:

- Solva, a village in Pembrokeshire, Wales
  - River Solva, in Pembrokeshire, Wales
  - Solva Group, a geological structure in Pembrokeshire, Wales
- Solva (fly), a genus in the family Xylomyidae
- Solva (Hungary), an early name for Esztergom, a city
- Flavia Solva, an ancient Roman municipium in what is now southern Austria, previously named Solva

== See also ==
- Solfa (disambiguation)
