= Middle Mill =

Village in Pembrokeshire, Wales

Coordinates: 51°53′17″N 5°11′21″W

Middle Mill: Welsh: Felinganol
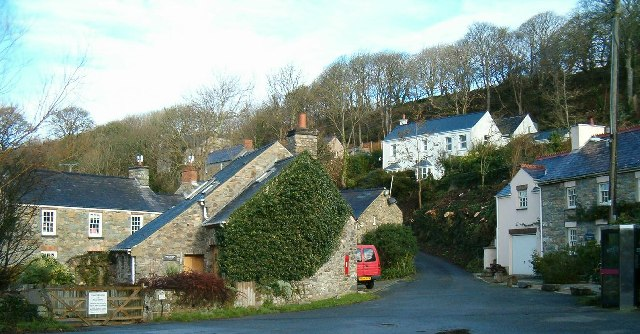
- Village Centre, Middle Mill

- Location within Pembrokeshire
- OS grid reference: SM806258
- Community: Solva
- Principal area: Pembrokeshire
- Country: Wales
- Sovereign state: United Kingdom
- Police: Dyfed-Powys
- Fire: Mid and West Wales
- Ambulance: Welsh
- UK Parliament: Mid and South Pembrokeshire

Middle Mill (Welsh: Felinganol) is a small settlement on the River Solva in the parish of Whitchurch, Pembrokeshire, Wales, approximately 1 mile upstream from the coastal village of Solva.

== Buildings and amenities ==
The settlement is centred on the water mill with its iron overshot millwheel. A mill in this location appears on a 1760 map, though the current mill dates to 1781. It is Grade II listed.

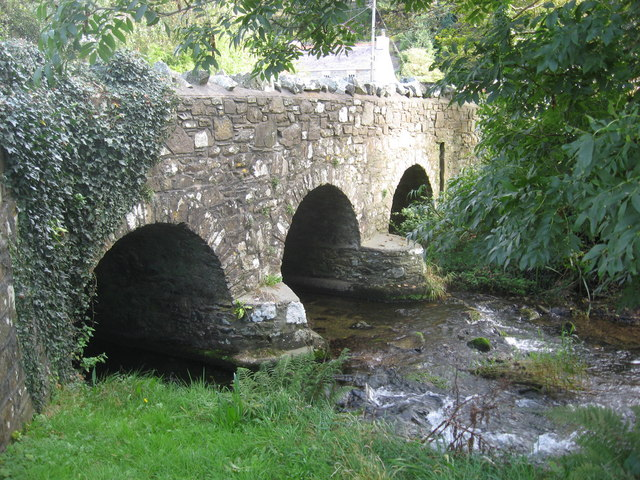
Bridge at the River Solva at Middle Mill

A three-arch stone road bridge crosses the river nearby, also Grade II listed and possibly dating back to the late 18th-century (one of its arches is over the mill leat).

There is also a Baptist chapel, originating in the 18th-century, though the existing building dates from 1833.

A commercial woollen mill is in operation in buildings behind the water mill, producing woven goods but currently specialising in making stair carpets. It made a carpet for the Carmarthenshire residence of Charles, Prince of Wales. Now called Solva Woollen Mill, it was originally opened in January 1907 and is the oldest working woollen mill in Pembrokeshire.
