= Carpet stretcher =

Tool used to install wall-to-wall carpet

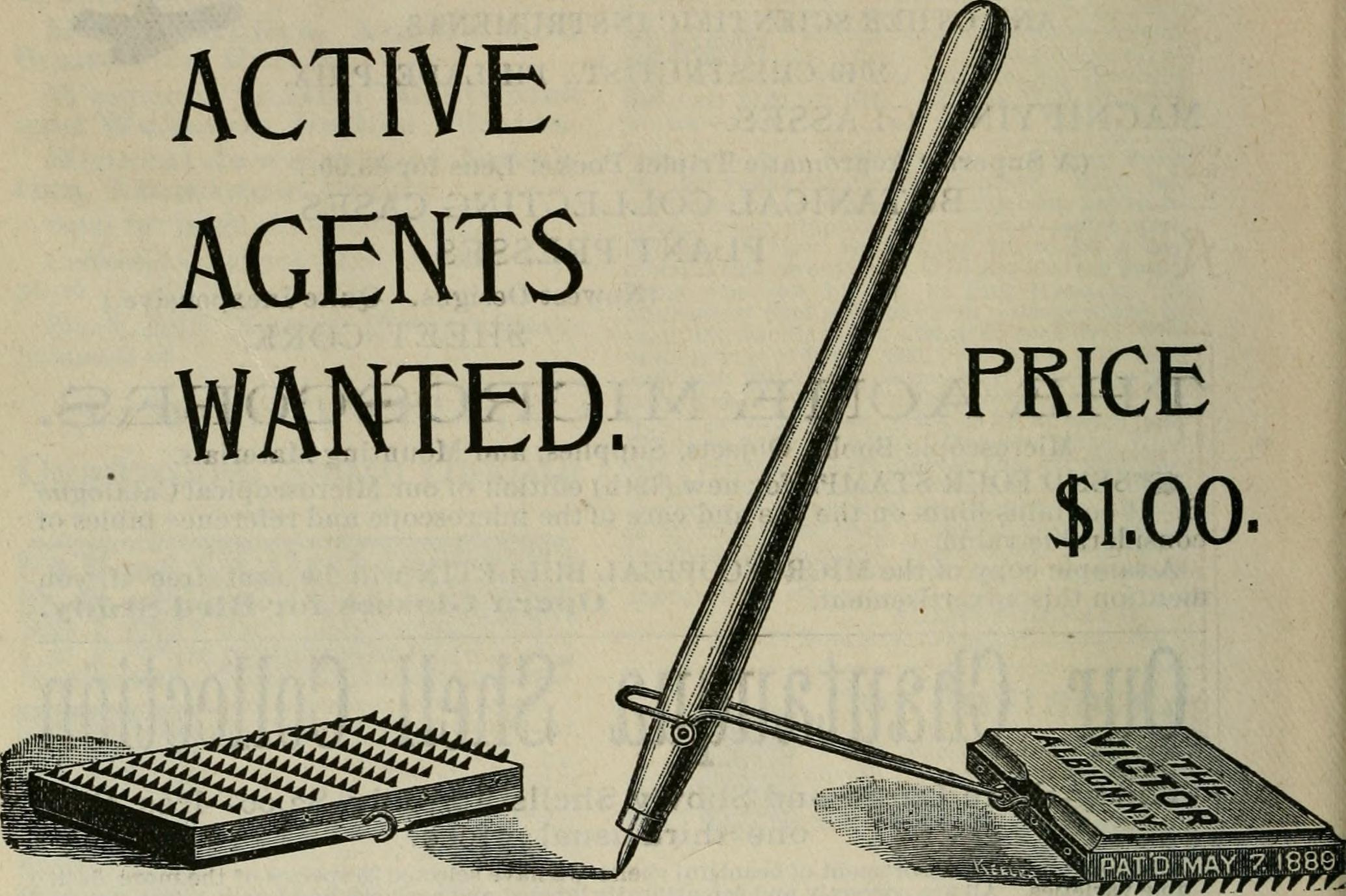
Advertisement for a carpet stretcher, dated 1894

A carpet stretcher is a specialized tool used to install wall-to-wall carpet. The tool grips the carpet with a set of tines on the head. A force applied to the tool then tensions the carpet and pulls it closer to the wall, where it can be fixed to a tack strip.

There are two main types of carpet stretchers: "power stretchers" and "knee kickers". Power stretchers apply tension with a lever, and use a pole, typically collapsible, to extend the tensioning force across the room. Power stretchers create more tension than knee kickers, and are used to tension carpeting in large rooms.

Knee kickers apply tension using a kick of the knee to the back of the tool. They are used to tension carpet in smaller spaces, such as closets, staircases, and rooms up to 10 feet (3.0 m) square. Failure to properly stretch carpet during installation can lead to the formation of wrinkles over time. According to industry standards, CRI 105 requires the use of a power stretcher on stretch-in carpet installations to ensure proper uniform tension and prevent long-term buckling.

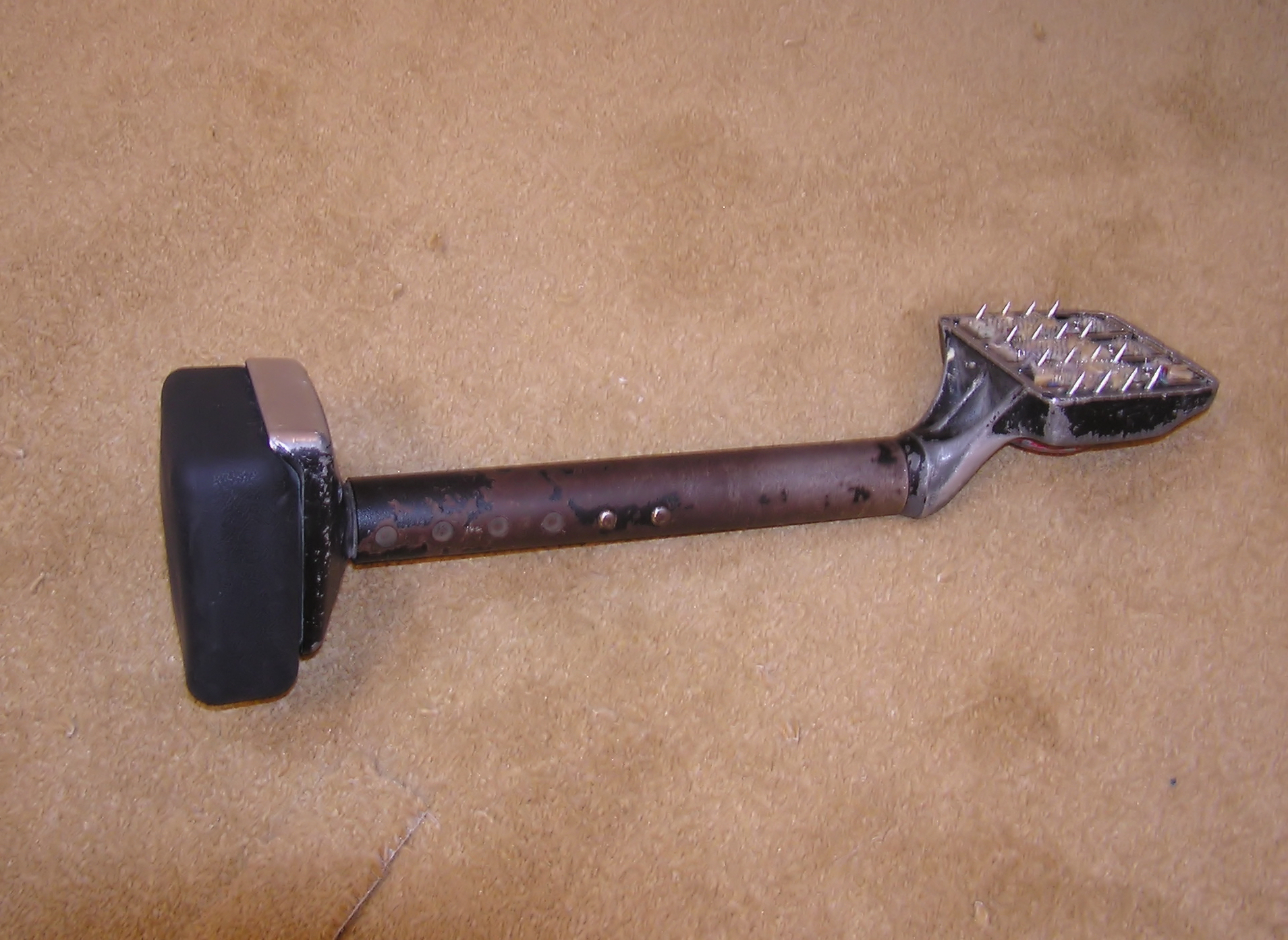
A "knee kicker"-type carpet stretcher

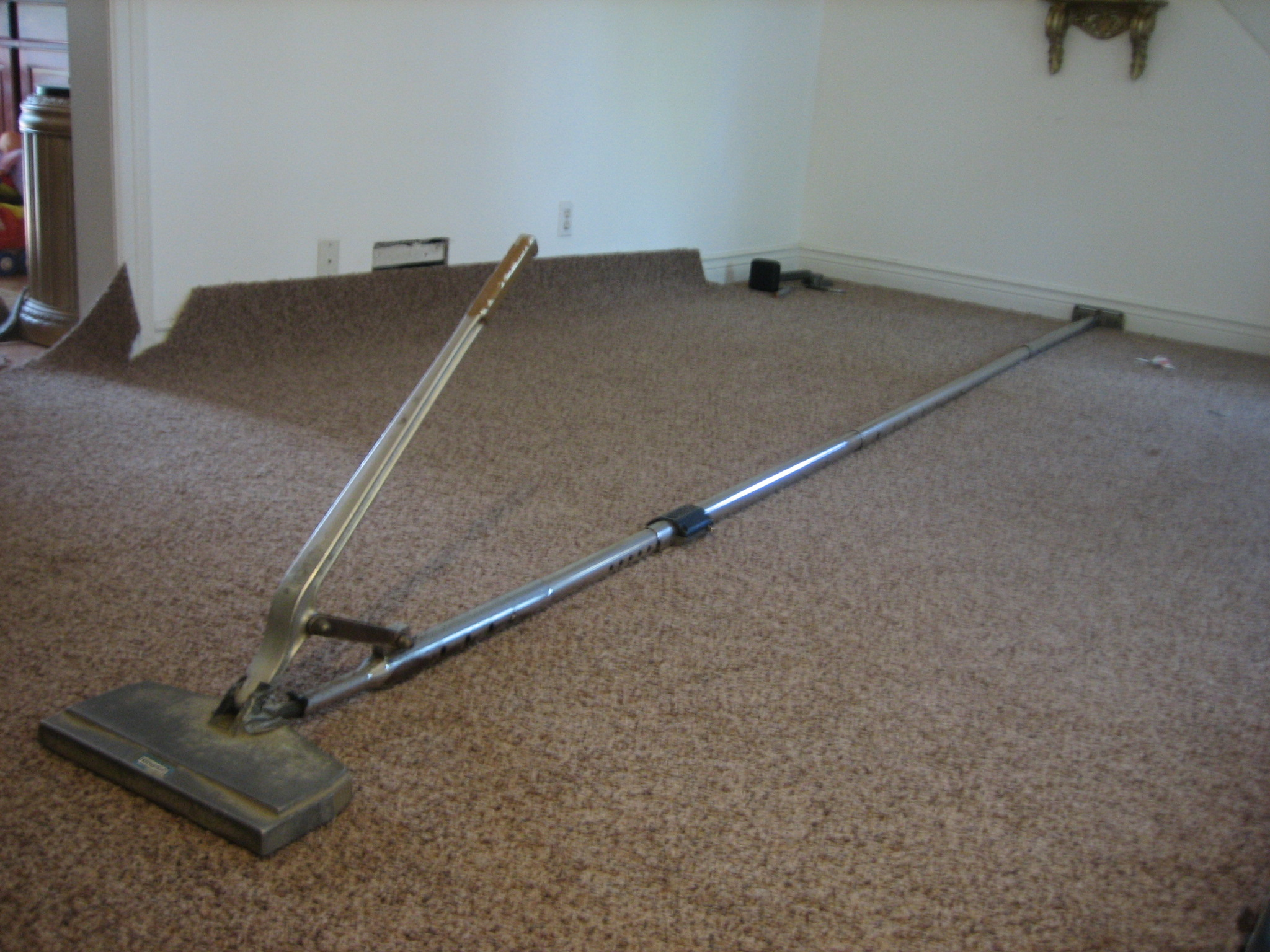
A power stretcher
