= Symphony in Slang =

- Directed by: Tex Avery
- Written by: Rich Hogan
- Story by: Rich Hogan
- Produced by: Fred Quimby
- Starring: John Brown
- Music by: Scott Bradley
- Animation by: Michael Lah; Grant Simmons; Walter Clinton
- Backgrounds by: John Didrik Johnsen
- Color process: Technicolor; Perspecta (re-released in 1958)
- Production company: MGM cartoon studio
- Distributed by: Metro-Goldwyn-Mayer
- Release dates: June 16, 1951 (U.S.); June 13, 1958 (U.S. re-release)
- Running time: 6 minutes, 43 seconds
- Language: English

Symphony in Slang is a 1951 cartoon short film directed by Tex Avery, written by Rich Hogan and released with the feature film No Questions Asked by Metro-Goldwyn-Mayer. Minimalist and abstract in style (many of the "gags" are created either with single, still frames or limited animation), it tells the story of a man (voiced by radio actor John Brown of My Friend Irma and The Life of Riley fame), who finds himself at the Pearly Gates explaining the story of his life to a bewildered Saint Peter and Noah Webster (also Brown) using slang of that era. The majority of the short is made up of sight gags based on Peter and Webster's literal interpretations of phrases such as "raining cats and dogs".

== Plot ==
A swing-savvy hep cat reaches Heaven and steps before Saint Peter. When asked to account for himself, his response is so peppered with slang that the Peter cannot understand him and seeks the help of the dictionary-penning Noah Webster. As the protagonist narrates his life story in his slang-heavy dialect, we see a series of sight gags based on literal interpretations (such as being born with a silver spoon in his mouth).

He grew up overnight, while the Night Sky cracked into a morning Background. The protagonist lived on the poverty line due an early failed career in foodservice. He went back to the cracked hole in the Wall, he's beside himself with an Anger emotion in a seat. He gets a train ticket to Texas to punch some Bulls, he travelled and met a girl named Mary in Chicago. When she gave him a date, he puts on his White Tie and Tails, so do Mary putting on a dog in her neck. He took her out dining, where she ate "like a horse" but he could not afford to pay the bill, upsetting a toothbrush-mustached restaurant proprietor. The narrator was incarcerated but eventually escaped and went to see Mary in New York City. She, however, was silent (due to the cat having her tongue). He walked out on her and went to pieces, so he heads down to Joe's Malt Shop where these men are hanging around. The protagonist saw a Soda Clerk while chewed on a rag. The protagonist learned from the Grapevine, that Mary was seeing an "old flame", who looks much like the stood-up waiter, cause he spends his money like water, connected with a Railroad, Mary and the groomer began to dance (while he couldn't make room for them), and the Man got in his hair.

Outside that he saw, it's Raining cats and dogs, the protagonist turned blue, before it fades to black, while he carried on to a Thousand Islands, while he combs in beach, he remembered Mary (due to a Tear ran down his cheek). The Protagonist sending Mary a cable, one day later, she sends him back a wire.

After another round of traveling, the protagonist went to make another plea to Mary. He was surprised to find her with many children, forcing her hubby to perform nonstop housework (to his chagrin). The narrator was so amused that he died laughing. Back in Heaven, the protagonist asks if Webster has followed him. Webster stammers, due to the cat having his tongue.

== Voice Cast ==
- John Brown as The Hep Cat / St. Peter / Noah Webster

== Availability ==
- Tex Avery Screwball Classics: Volume 1 (Blu-Ray)
