= Willo the Wisp =

- Willo the Wisp Titles (BBC Series)
- Genre: Children's animation
- Written by: Nick Spargo (1981 series); Bobbie Spargo (2005 series)
- Voices of: Kenneth Williams (1981 series); James Dreyfus (2005 series)
- Country of origin: England
- Original language: English
- No. of series: 2
- No. of episodes: 52

Production
- Running time: 5 minutes
- Production companies: Nicholas Cartoon Films (1981 series), Spargo Films & Double:Take (2005 series)

Original release
- Network: BBC1 (1981 series); Playhouse Disney (2005 series)
- Release: 14 September 1981 – 7 December 2005

Willo the Wisp is an English cartoon series originally produced in 1981 by the BBC and narrated by Kenneth Williams. It became popular with children and adults, as it bridged the gap between the end of weekday children's programming and the early evening news. A second series was produced in 2005. Both series 1 & 2 were released together on DVD and Blu-ray versions in the UK during late August 2024 by Fabulous Films.

== Original series (1981) ==
The series was written and directed by Nick Spargo and produced by Nicholas Cartoon Films, in association with the BBC and Tellytales Enterprises. The character of Willo the Wisp originated in an award-winning educational animation created by Spargo for British Gas in 1975 and the stories were set in Doyley Woods, a small beech wood located in Henley-on-Thames, Oxfordshire, near the director's home.

Kenneth Williams provided voices for all of the characters. The principal narrator, Willo the Wisp, was a blue floating creature drawn as a caricature of Williams, while the name refers to the ghostly light will-o'-the-wisp from folklore. The other main characters were Arthur the caterpillar, as a gruff cockney; Mavis Cruet, a plump, clumsy fairy with an erratic magic wand; and the principal antagonist, Evil Edna, a witch in the form of a walking, talking television set, who could zap people with her aerials.

Other characters included Carwash, a snooty bespectacled cat who was based on Noël Coward with the catchphrase "My eyes are not first-class, you know"; The Moog, a supposed dog who is not allowed to think for himself; Twit, a small bird; The Beast, a former human prince turned into a hairy shambling creature by Evil Edna; the Astrognats, a group of bugs who explore outer space by means of their toadstool rocket; the Bookworm; gnomes; and a regiment of toy soldiers.

Each of the original 26 episodes lasted approximately five minutes and was broadcast at 5:35pm on BBC1. This continued a tradition of short cartoons and stop-motion animation series, such as The Magic Roundabout and The Wombles, being shown on weekdays between the end of the main children's programming for that afternoon and the BBC Early Evening news at 5:40pm. The series was repeated on satellite channel Galaxy in 1989 and on Channel 4 during the early 1990s.

=== Credits ===
- The Voices of: Kenneth Williams
- Music by: Tony Kinsey
- Script and Direction: Nicholas Spargo
- Animation: Ron Murdoch, Ted Percival, Mike Pocock
- Devised and Designed by: Nick Spargo
- Editor: Michael Crane
- Backgrounds: Mary Spargo
- Camera: Chris King
- Production Assistant: Andrea Fontaine
- Trace & Paint: Lynne Sachs & Ian Sachs
- Produced by: Nicholas Cartoon Films Ltd
- Processed by: Rank Film Laboratories Ltd

== Revival series (2005) ==
A revival series of 26 episodes (5 minutes each) was produced by Bobbie Spargo in 2005, and voiced by James Dreyfus. Although it maintains the style of the original, alterations include:

- Willo no longer being a caricature of Williams, but rather one of Dreyfus.
- Mavis being slimmer (although still too heavy to fly).
- Evil Edna being a widescreen television, with a wheeled stand instead of the original's metal legs, and many more channels, and had more powers, one example is using her electricity to grab somebody, similar to Emperor Palpatine from Star Wars.

The revival series aired on Playhouse Disney UK.

== Episodes ==
=== Series 1 (1981) ===
No.	Title	Original release date
1	"The Bride-Groom"	14 September 1981
2	"Edna's Secret"	17 September 1981
3	"Food For Thought"	23 September 1981
4	"Holidays"	28 September 1981
5	"The Dragon"	21 September 1981
6	"The Wishbone"	30 September 1981
The Moog encounters a magic wishbone by chance and uses it to wish for the power of thinking so he can make all kinds of wishes. When the Moog wishes that Evil Edna was nice, Edna decides to take the wishbone from the Moog, only for the Moog to make one more wish.
7	"The Chrysalis"	24 September 1981
Inspired by the moths that appear in the Doyley Wood at night, Arthur builds a chrysalis and purchases a moth suit in order to become a moth himself. When his first time flying encounters a technical hitch, Evil Edna decides to "help" him with an evil spell.
8	"The Magnet"	22 October 1981
9	"Wugged Wocks"	29 October 1981
10	"The Flight of Mavis"	15 September 1981
11	"The Thoughts of Moog"	16 October 1981
When the Moog starts thinking for the very first time, he thinks about throwing a tomato in Evil Edna's face. Rather than turn him into a frog for such a thought, Edna decides to use the Moog's inexperience with thinking to her advantage.
12	"The Joys of Spring"	2 October 1981
13	"Games With Edna"	22 September 1981
When Evil Edna turns Mavis into a weeping willow tree, Arthur orders Edna to remove the spell and vows to use "Caterpillar Magic" on Edna as payback if she does not comply. The "magic" comes soon enough when Arthur purchases a video game controller from a traveling salesman, hooks it up to Edna, and uses her to play tennis.
14	"The Hot Hot Day"	18 September 1981
15	"Halloween"	30 October 1981
Halloween in the Doyley Woods just also happens to be Evil Edna's birthday. In order to prevent her from turning them all into frogs for the occasion, Mavis conjures up a witch kit so Edna can join the other witches up in the sky. The catch with Edna's present is that everyone (including Arthur) must think positive thoughts to keep Mavis' spell working, but when Edna, in gratitude for her birthday present, casts a "Stay as you are forever" spell on everyone (while they still have their Halloween masks on), it does not last long.
16	"The Gnome"	16 September 1981
17	"Boring Old Edna"	9 October 1981
18	"The "You Know What""	1 October 1981
19	"The Bean-Stalk"	25 September 1981
20	"Cats and Dogs"	6 November 1981
Evil Edna makes it "rain cats and dogs" quite literally, when she floods the forest with replicas of Carwash and the Moog.
21	"The Midas Touch"	15 October 1981
22	"The Viqueen"	29 September 1981
23	"The Potion"	8 October 1981
24	"The Beauty Contest"	5 November 1981
25	"Magic Golf"	23 October 1981
26	"Christmas Box"	24 December 1981
Christmas time arrives in Doyley Woods and everyone is in a festive mood, even Evil Edna. But when Santa doesn't appear Arthur and Mavis think Edna has done something to him.

=== Series 2 (2005) ===
No.	Title	Original release date
1	"Moon on a Stick"	31 October 2005
2	"The Toothache"	2005
3	"The Nature Walk"	2005
4	"Feed the Birds"	2005
5	"The Magic Bone"	2005
6	"The Knotted Handkerchief"	2005
7	"The Little Cloud"	2005
8	"The Mind Reader"	2005
9	"The Fancy Dress Ball"	2005
10	"Bowling for Carwash"	2005
11	"The Knee-Knocking Tree"	2005
12	"The Best Friend"	2005
13	"The Tiddle Me Wink"	2005
14	"The Makeover"	2005
15	"The Miracle"	2005
16	"The Love Bug"	2005
17	"The Wobbly Wood"	2005
18	"The Doyley Hunt"	2005
19	"The Cocoa Demon"	2005
20	"The Beauty Spot"	2005
21	"The Curse of Celebrity"	2005
22	"The Lost City of Polenta"	2005
23	"The Woodwind"	2005
24	"The Vegetable Garden"	2005
25	"The Art Class"	2005
26	"Here Comes the Judge"	7 December 2005

== Home media ==
On the Kult Kidz Gold DVD, there was an extra video "Do Not Touch" which featured the last part of "Cats and Dogs", where Evil Edna makes the screen blank.

In January 2008, a promotional DVD containing all 26 episodes from Series 1 was distributed by The Times newspaper.

In August 2024, the revival series was released on home media in the UK for the first time, together with the first series, on a two disc set with both DVD and Blu-ray versions available. Both versions contained a special feature on the first series disc: the full 1975 original appearance of Willo the Wisp in the award-winning Super Natural Gas animation.
