= Solva limekilns =

Coordinates: 51°52′21″N 5°11′26″W

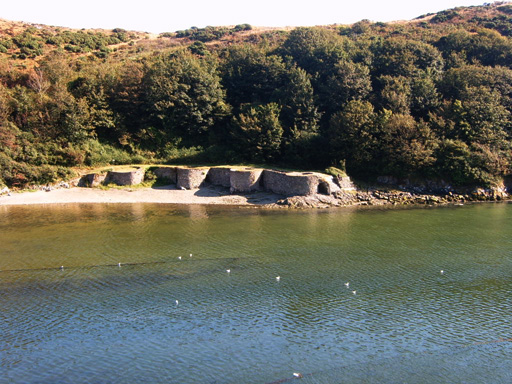
The row of limekilns on the harbour edge

The Solva limekilns are a row of disused limekilns in the harbour of the village of Solva, Pembrokeshire, Wales. The kilns have a Grade II heritage listing.

== Description ==
The row of four linked limekilns is located on the south side of the harbour above the high water line at the base of the Gribyn headland. The kilns are built from rubble stone and include the foundation outline of a watchman's hut.

The kilns are circular, with wall thickness ranging from 50 to 100 centimeters (20 to 39 inches). Each kiln has (or had) a circular hole at the top, approximately 2 meters (6.6 feet) across, and entrance holes at the base. There are straight sections of wall linking the row of kilns.

== History ==
There were originally twelve limekilns in Solva, and the burning of limestone was one of the main industries of the village. An 1811 report about the village describes "the hot vapor, "and the dirt and noise of carting incident to them, make them very offensive proving a great drawback on a residence". Initially on the harbor edge there were only three kilns, according to a watercolor painting dating from 1795. The village's limekilns were used until about 1900.

After decades of disuse, the row of kilns were restored in 1981-1982, and they now stand as a reminder of the village’s industrial heritage.
