= Solva Woollen Mill =

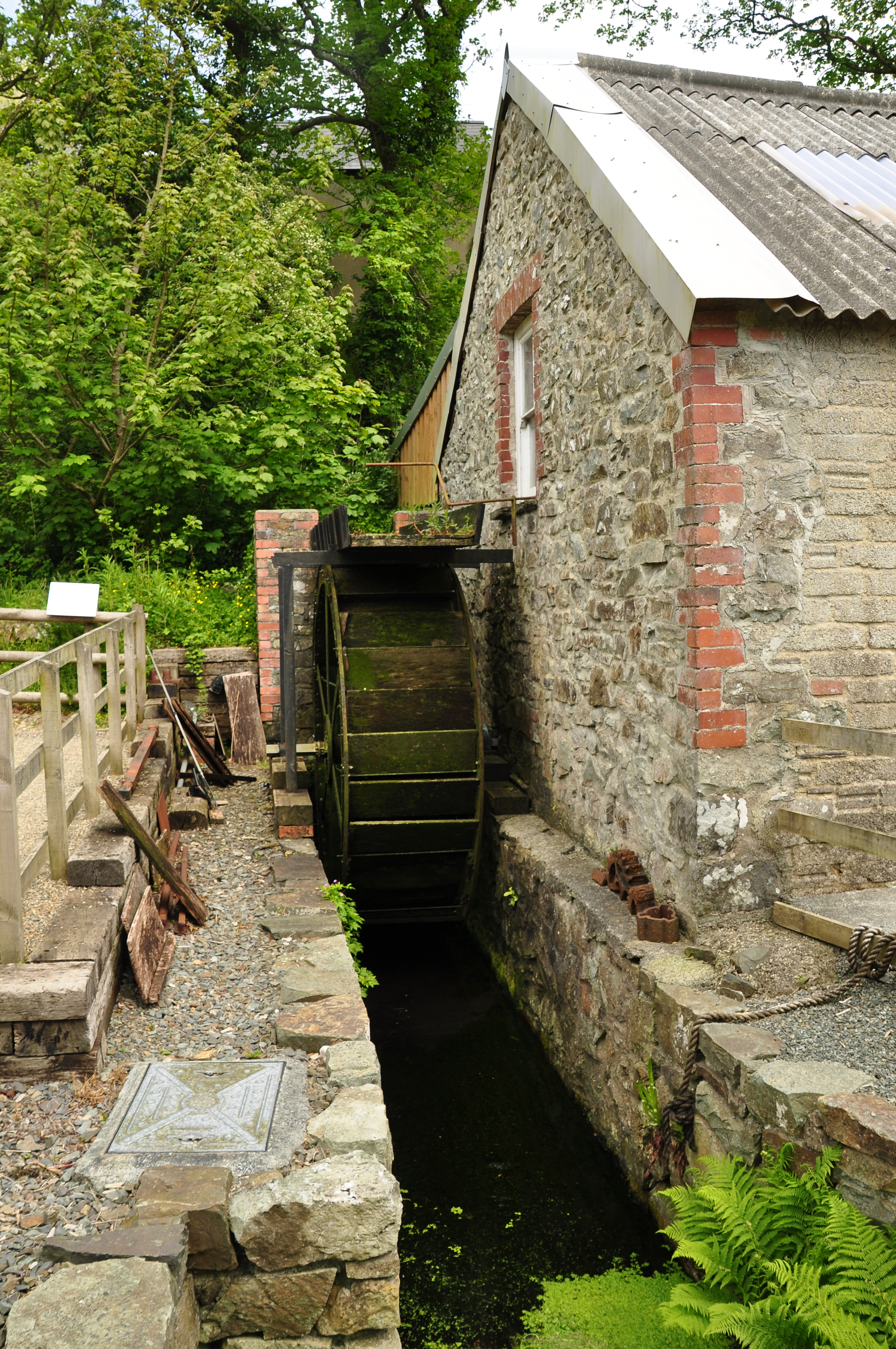
- Solva Mill waterwheel

- Location within Pembrokeshire
- Operated: 1907
- Location: www.solvawoollenmill.co.uk; Middle Mill, Pembrokeshire, Pembrokeshire, Wales
- Coordinates: 51.888557°N 5.190040°W
- Industry: Woollen industry in Wales
- Products: Woven rugs and runners

Solva Woollen Mill is a woollen mill in the village of Middle Mill, about one mile from Solva, Pembrokeshire, Wales, that has been in operation since 1907.

== History ==
Solva Woollen Mill claims to be the oldest working woollen mill in Pembrokeshire. There were 26 woollen mills in Pembrokeshire in 1900. Today Solva Woollen Mill is one of the two remaining woollen mills in the county. (Note: The other working woollen mill is Melin Tregwynt)

In 1907 Tom Griffiths moved his mill from St Davids to a new purpose-built building in Middle Mill powered by a 10 feet (3.0 m) diameter overshot water wheel. Equipment included machinery to process the fleece, several small powered looms, a hand loom for making stair carpets and a flannel press. At first the cloth was finished at a nearby fulling mill, but later the mill installed its own fulling machine. The mill made tweeds, blankets, flannel, stair carpets and knitting wool. Prime Minister Ramsay MacDonald had a Middle Mill tweed suit made in 1929.

Tom Griffith's son-in-law, Eric Hemmingway, took over the operation in 1950, began producing carpets on the power looms, then upgraded to larger and more modern machinery. An oil-fired engine replaced the water wheel. In the early 1960s another weaving shed was built and electrical looms installed using the newly available mains electricity. The carding and spinning plant was scrapped, and the mill began using pre-spun and dyed yarn. By the 1970s the bulk of the production was carpeting. The mill was sold to new owners in 1986.

== Today ==
The waterwheel was restored in 2007. The original mill building was renovated in 2011 and is now a shop and tea room. The mill today specializes in making flat woven rugs and runners. Their rugs are sold in the United Kingdom, Japan, the US and Australia. The Prince of Wales and Duchess of Cornwall have visited the Solva Woollen Mill and used rugs from the mill in furnishing their property at Llwynywermod.

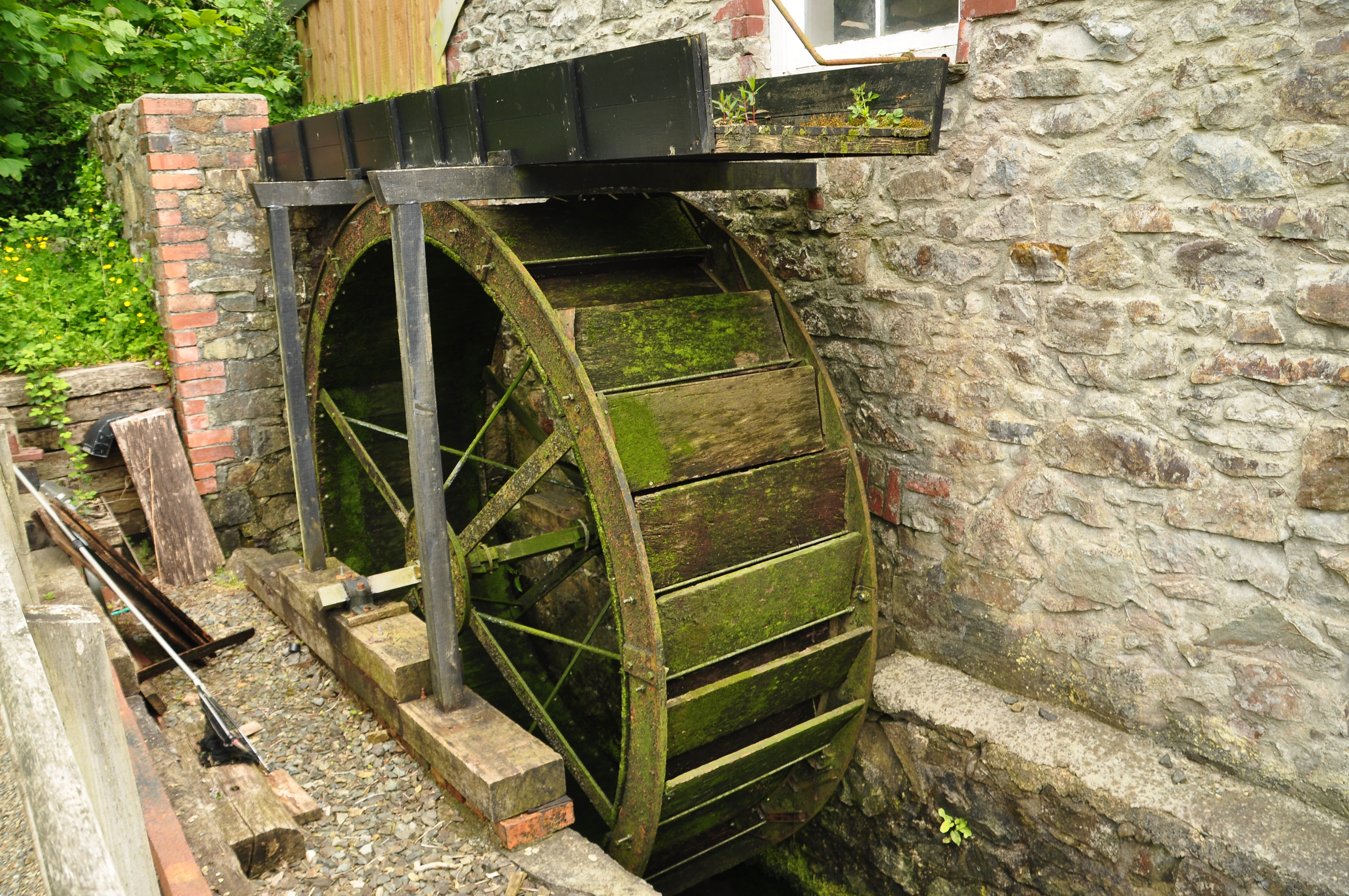
Water wheel

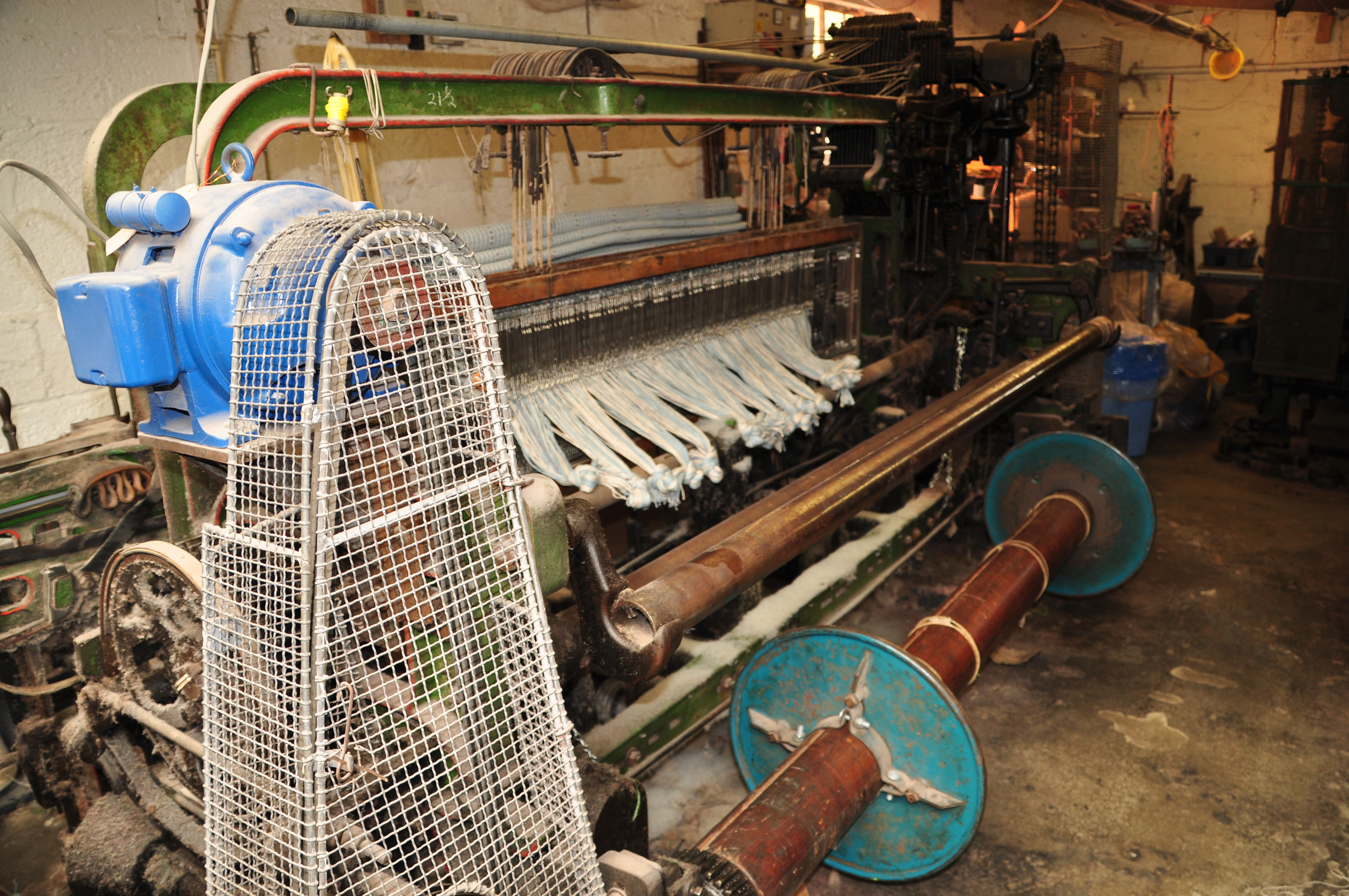
Loom

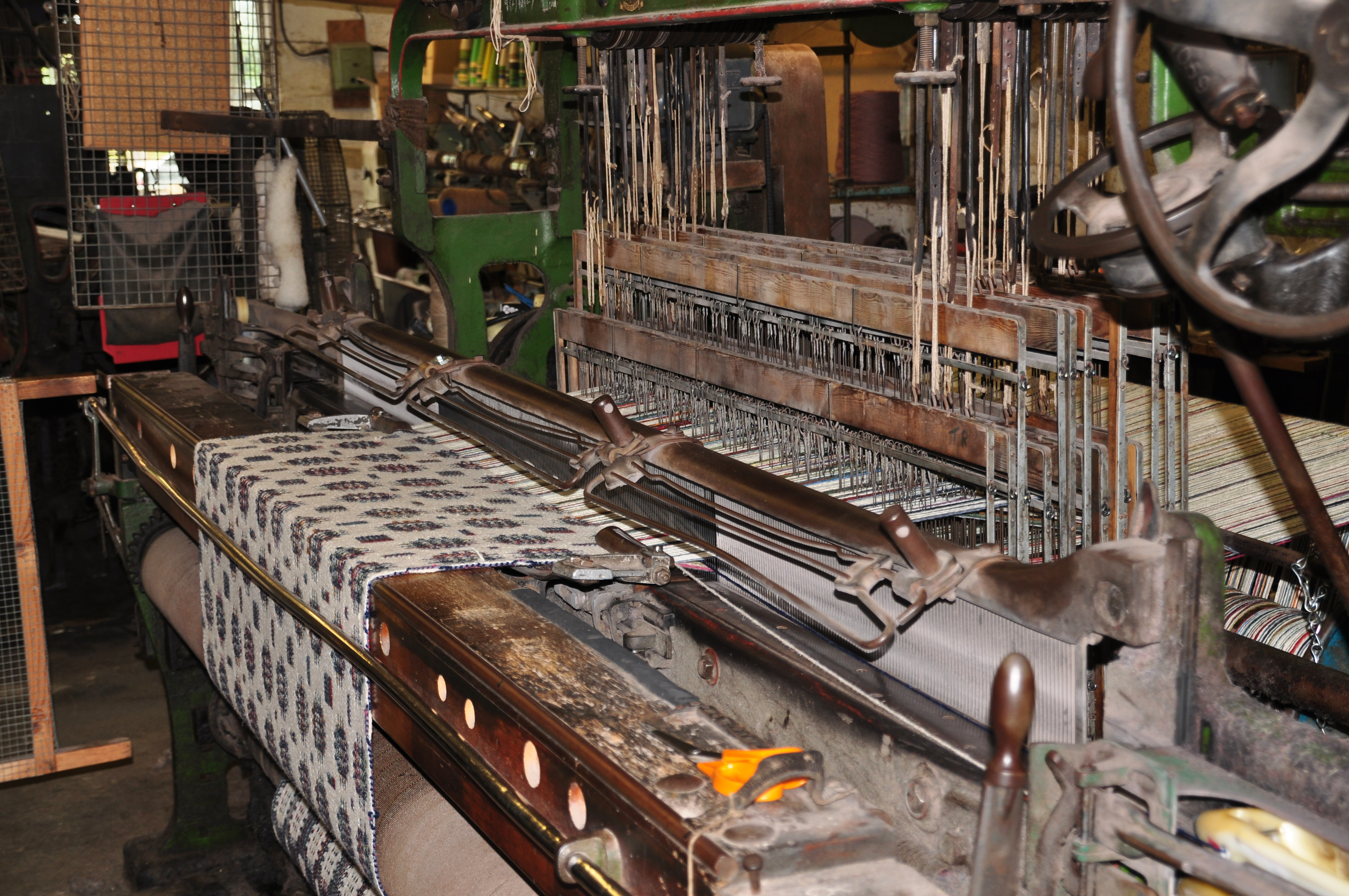
Loom

== Sources ==
- Home, Solva Woollen Mill
- Llwynywermod, Prince of Wales
- Melin Tregwynt, Welsh Mills Society – Cymdeithas Melinau Cymru
- Mill History, Solva Woollen Mill
- Morris, Jackie (5 July 2013), On the last day of #IBW2013: or, last, but by no means least. Solva Woollen Mill (blog)
- Solva – A Gem in Pembrokeshire, Morawel B & B
- "Solva", Solva Regattas
- "Solva Woollen Mill", Welsh Mills
- Solva Woollen Mill, Welsh Mills Society • Cymdeithas Melinau Cymru
