= Solfa =

Solfa may refer to:

- Solfège, a pedagogical solmization technique for the teaching of sight-singing
- Trade name for Amlexanox, a pharmaceutical drug

See also

- Solva (disambiguation)
