= Lluvia de peces =

Rain of fish in Yoro, Honduras

Location of the Yoro department

The lluvia de peces (lit. 'rain of fish'), also known as aguacero de pescado (lit. 'downpour of fish'), is a phenomenon in Yoro, Honduras, wherein fish are able to be found on the ground after large storms. It has been occurring for over a hundred years, said by residents to occur yearly in the mid-year rainy season. They have been described as a form of rain of animals, though they do not appear to fall from the sky.

== Festival ==
Beginning in 1998, locals of the department of Yoro, Honduras have held an annual Festival de Lluvia de Peces to celebrate the phenomenon. The date of the festival is variable, coinciding with the first major rainfall in May or June. The festival includes a parade and carnival.

== Explanations ==
=== Scientific ===
The explanation generally offered for the rain of fish is meteorological, often speculated to be strong winds or waterspouts, as is commonly proposed when attempting to explain similar occurrences of raining animals. The nearest marine source for the fish is the Atlantic Ocean, about 72 km (45 mi) away, though this explanation might be seen as unlikely due to the improbability of waterspouts collecting fish in the open sea every year in May or June and transporting them directly to Yoro.

Alternatively, the fish may have originated in fresh water and moved from a nearby river into a subterranean water current or cave system in response to seasonal changes. Subsequent heavy rains wash the fish up out of this habitat and the water recedes to leave the fish stranded.

=== Miraculous ===
To many in the area, naturalistic explanations are disregarded in favour of miraculous explanations. Spanish priest Father José Manuel de Jesús Subirana arrived in Honduras in 1855 and stayed until his death in 1864. In legend, it said that: "Father Subirana saw how poor the people of Honduras were and prayed three days and three nights asking God for a miracle to help the poor people and to provide them with food. After these three days and nights, God took note of this and there came a dark cloud. Many tasty fish fell from the sky, feeding all the people. Since then this wonder is repeated every year."
