= Rain of animals =

Reported meteorological phenomenon

Animal rain is a rare meteorological phenomenon in which flightless animals fall from the sky. Such occurrences have been reported in many countries throughout history, an example being the lluvia de peces, a phenomenon that has occurred many times in Honduras. One hypothesis is that tornadic waterspouts sometimes pick up creatures such as fish or frogs and carry them for up to several miles. However, this aspect of the phenomenon has never been witnessed by scientists.

== History ==
Rain of flightless animals and things has been reported throughout history. In the Bible, a rain of frogs is described as one of the ten plagues of Egypt. The Bible also mentions other similar events, such as quail falling from the sky to save the Hebrews from hunger in Exodus 16:13. In the fourth century BC, the Greek Athenaeus mentioned a rain of fish that lasted three days in the region of Chaeronea in the Peloponnese. In the Middle Ages, the frequency of the phenomenon in certain regions led locals to imagine that fish were born in the skies before falling into the sea.

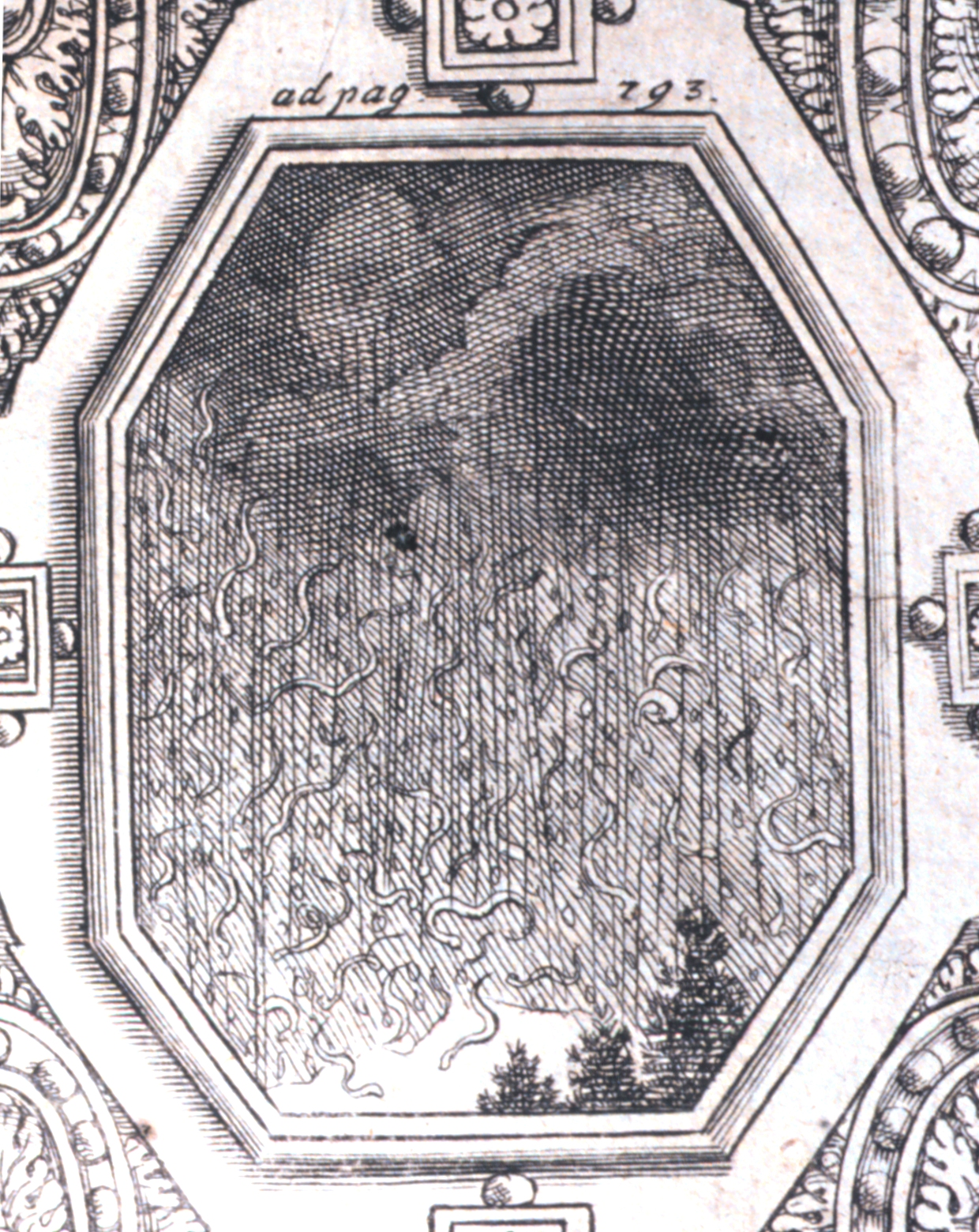
Raining snakes, 1680

In 1625, a rain of frogs was reported to have hit Tournai, Belgium. In 1794, French soldiers saw toads fall from the sky during heavy rain at Lalain, near the French city of Lille. Rural inhabitants in Yoro, Honduras claim "fish rain" happens there every summer, a phenomenon they call the lluvia de peces, although the name may be indoctrination from a Spanish missionary as the fish have only been found near tributaries after storms.

== Explanations ==
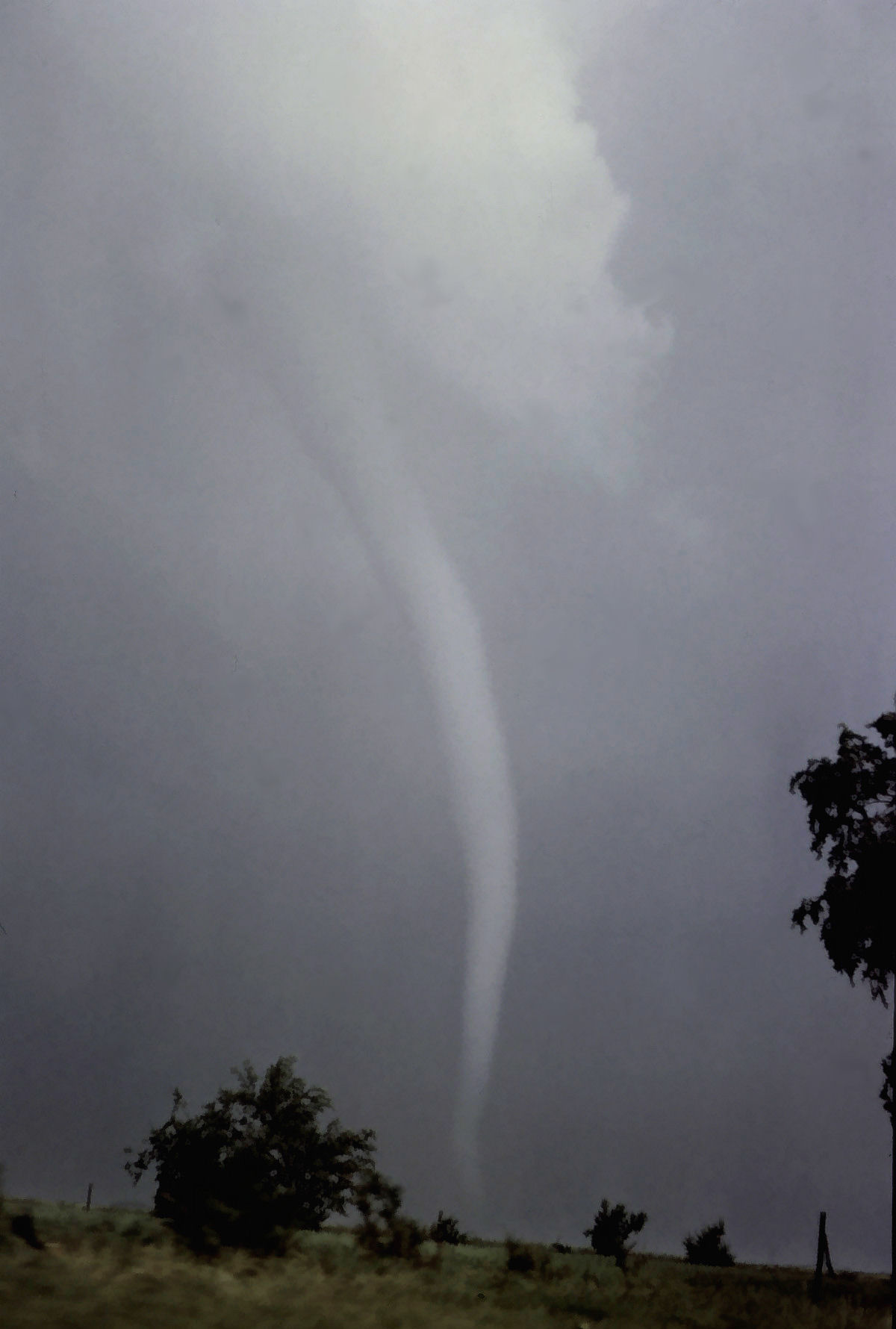
Tornadoes and waterspouts may lift up animals into the air and deposit them miles away.

French physicist André-Marie Ampère (1775–1836) was among the first scientists to take accounts of raining animals. Addressing the Society of Natural Science, Ampère suggested that at times frogs and toads roam the countryside in large numbers, and that violent winds could pick them up and carry them great distances.

After a reported rain of fish in Singapore in 1861, French naturalist Francis de Laporte de Castelnau speculated that a migration of walking catfish had taken place, dragging themselves over land from one puddle to another, following the rain.

The likeliest explanation for many of the supposed cases is that there is no falling happening at all and the animals are driven along by winds or a deluge of some sort. This explanation accounts for the prevalence of reports that just a single species or type of animal raining from the sky. On several occasions within two weeks during October, 1987, people in three towns of the English county of Gloucestershire reported bearing witness to the phenomena. Residents of Stroud, Cirencester, and Cheltenham reported heavy rainfall that also brought down dozens of tiny pink frogs. Some suggested strong winds, waterspouts, or tornados carried the frogs' eggs flying north across Africa, until falling on England.

A current scientific hypothesis involves tornadic waterspouts: a tornado that forms over the water. Under this hypothesis, a tornadic waterspout transports animals to relatively high altitudes, carrying them over large distances. This hypothesis appears supported by the type of animals in these rains: small and light, usually aquatic, and by the suggestion that the rain of animals is often preceded by a storm. However, the theory does not account for how all the animals involved in each individual incident would be from only one species, and not a group of similarly sized animals from a single area. Further, the theory also does not account for a genuine tornadic waterspout not actually sucking objects up and carrying them rather than flinging objects out to the sides.

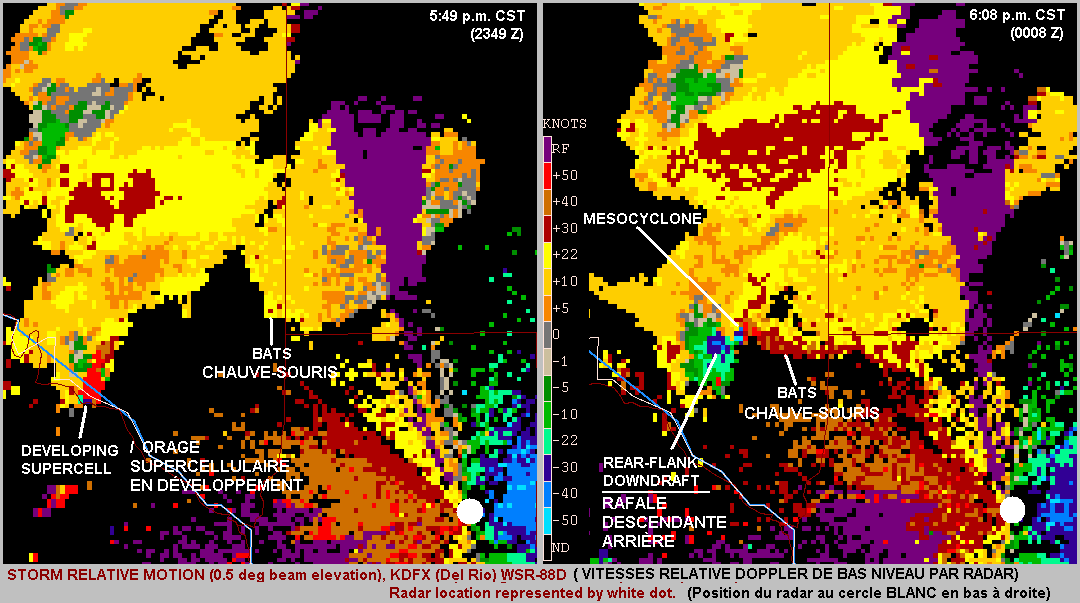
Doppler Image from Texas showing the collision of a thunderstorm with a group of bats in flight. The color red indicates the animals flying into the storm.

In the case of birds, storms may overcome a flock in flight, especially in times of migration. The Doppler image to the right shows an example wherein a group of bats is overtaken by a thunderstorm. In the image, the bats are in the red zone, which corresponds to winds moving away from the radar station, and enter into a mesocyclone associated with a tornado (in green). These events may occur easily with birds, which can get killed in flight, or stunned and then fall (unlike flightless creatures, which first have to be lifted into the air by an outside force). Sometimes this happens in large groups, for instance, the blackbirds falling from the sky in Beebe, Arkansas, United States, on 31 December 2010. It is common for birds to become disoriented (for example, because of bad weather or fireworks) and collide with objects such as trees or buildings, killing them or stunning them into falling to their death. The number of blackbirds killed in Beebe is not spectacular considering the size of their congregations, which can be in the millions. The event in Beebe, however, captured the imagination and led to more reports in the media of birds falling from the sky across the globe, such as in Sweden and Italy, though many scientists claim such mass deaths are common occurrences but usually go unnoticed. In contrast, it is harder to find a plausible explanation for rains of terrestrial animals.

Some cases are thought to be caused by birds dropping fish. With regard to a documented rain of fish that occurred on 29 December 2021 in Texarkana, Texas. Several residents of a landlocked city, in east Texas have reported a rare sight seeing fish all over the ground after they apparently fell from the sky during a rainstorm. Independent researchers, Sharon A. Hill and Paul Cropper, proposed that the fish had been dropped or possibly regurgitated by passing birds. The theory found some favor with airport workers who had cleaned up the fish; they noted that there were birds in the area around the same time, and the fish "were kind of chewed up". In June 2022 around the San Francisco coast, a boom of anchovies is likely to be the cause of fair weather falling of fish from birds' mouths, such as pelicans.

== Occurrences ==
The following list is a selection of examples.

=== Fish ===
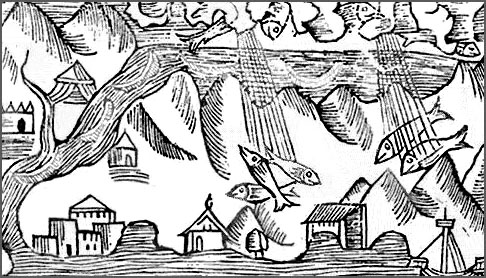
1555 engraving of rain of fish

- Singapore, 22 February 1861
- Tarai, Nepal, 15 May 1900
- Moose Jaw, Saskatchewan, Canada, 1 July 1903
- Marksville, Louisiana, 23 October 1947
- Ilorin, Kwara State, Nigeria, 19 May 1993
- Knighton, Powys, Wales, 18 August 2004
- Kerala State, India, 12 February 2008
- Bhanwad, Jamnagar, India, 24 October 2009
- Lajamanu, Northern Territory, Australia, 25 and 26 February 2010
- Loreto, Agusan del Sur, Philippines, 13 January 2012
- IIT Madras, Chennai, Tamil Nadu, India, 12 September 2013
- The annual lluvia de peces in Yoro, Honduras
- Chilaw, Sri Lanka, 6 May 2014
- Nandigama, Andhra Pradesh, India, 19 June 2015
- Guntur, Andhra Pradesh, India, 16 August 2015
- Dire Dawa, Ethiopia, 20 January 2016
- Pathapatnam, Srikakulam district, Andhra Pradesh, 19 May 2016
- Philadelphia, Pennsylvania, 9 September 2016
- Mexico, Tamaulipas, Tampico, 26 September 2017
- Oroville, California, 16 May 2017
- Jaffna, Sri Lanka, 7 November 2017
- Texarkana, Texas, 30 December 2021.

=== Spiders ===
- Albury, Australia, 1974
- Santo Antônio da Platina, Brazil, 3 February 2013
- Goulburn, Australia, 15 May 2015

=== Frogs and toads ===
- Stroud, Cirencester, and Cheltenham, three towns of Gloucestershire, England, 24 October 1987 (several occurrences within two weeks)
- Ishikawa Prefecture, Japan, June 2009 (occurrences reported throughout the month)
- Rákóczifalva, Hungary, 18–20 June 2010 (twice)
- Cabo Polonio, Uruguay, Since 2011 (twice)

=== Others ===
- Jellyfish: Bath, England, 1894
- Worms: Jennings, Louisiana, 11 July 2007
- Various marine animals, including octopuses, seashells and starfish: Qingdao, Shandong Province, China, 13 June 2018

== See also ==
- Blood rain
- Debris fallout
- Flying fish
- Kentucky meat shower
- Lluvia de peces, (Honduras, "fish rain")
- Raining cats and dogs
- Red rain in Kerala
- Star jelly
- Cloudy With a Chance of Meatballs
