= Fitted carpet =

Floor covering

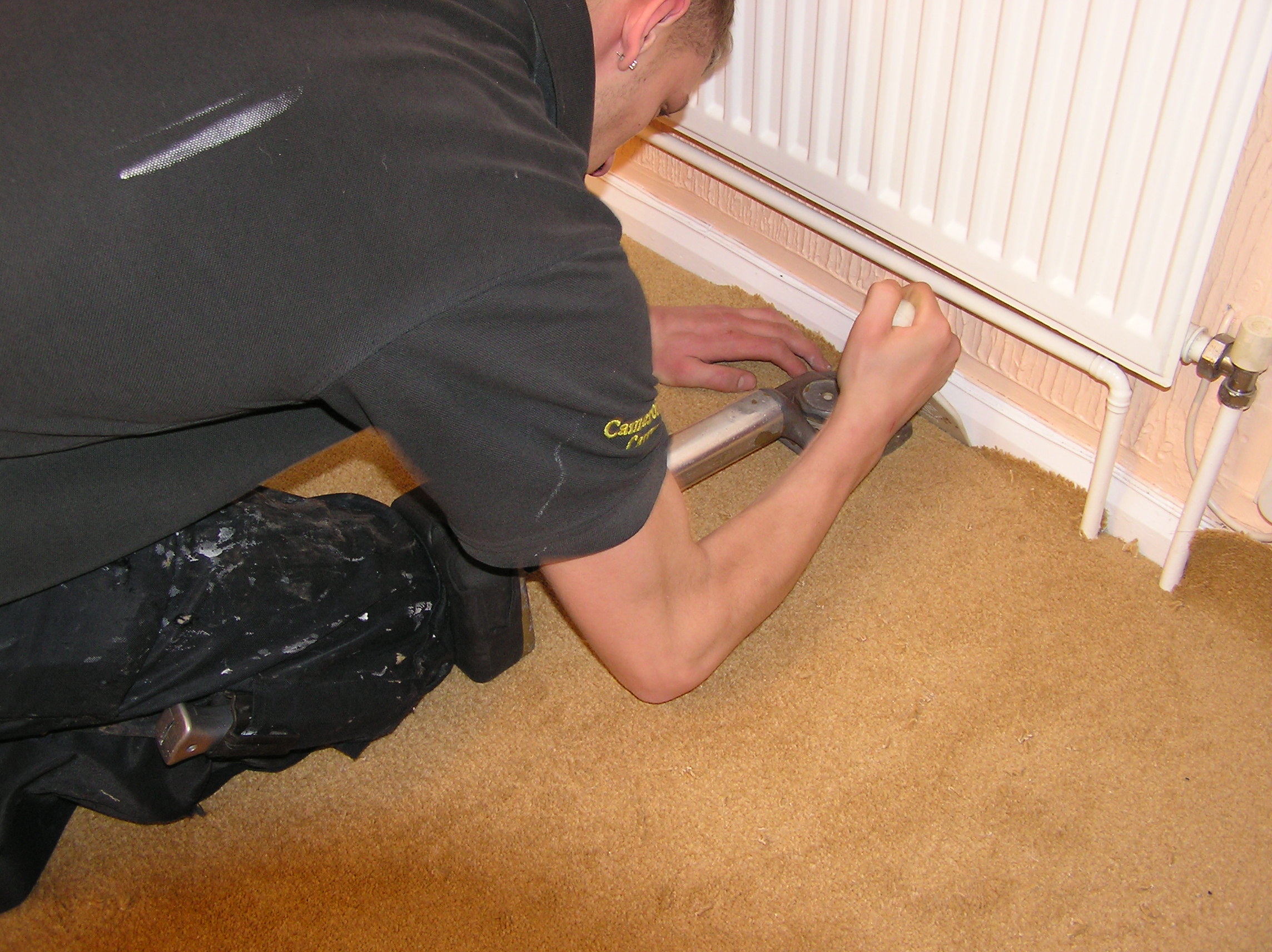
The carpet fitter is stretching a carpet onto gripper strip using a manual stretcher tool.

Fitted carpet, also wall-to-wall carpet, is a carpet intended to cover a floor entirely. Carpet over 4 meters in length is usually installed with the use of a power-stretcher (tubed or tubeless).

Fitted carpets were originally woven to the dimensions of the specific area they were covering. They were later made in smaller strips, around the time stair carpet became popular, and woven at the site of the job by the carpet fitter. These carpets were then held in place with individually nailed tacks driven through the carpet around the perimeter and occasionally small rings in the carpet which were folded over.

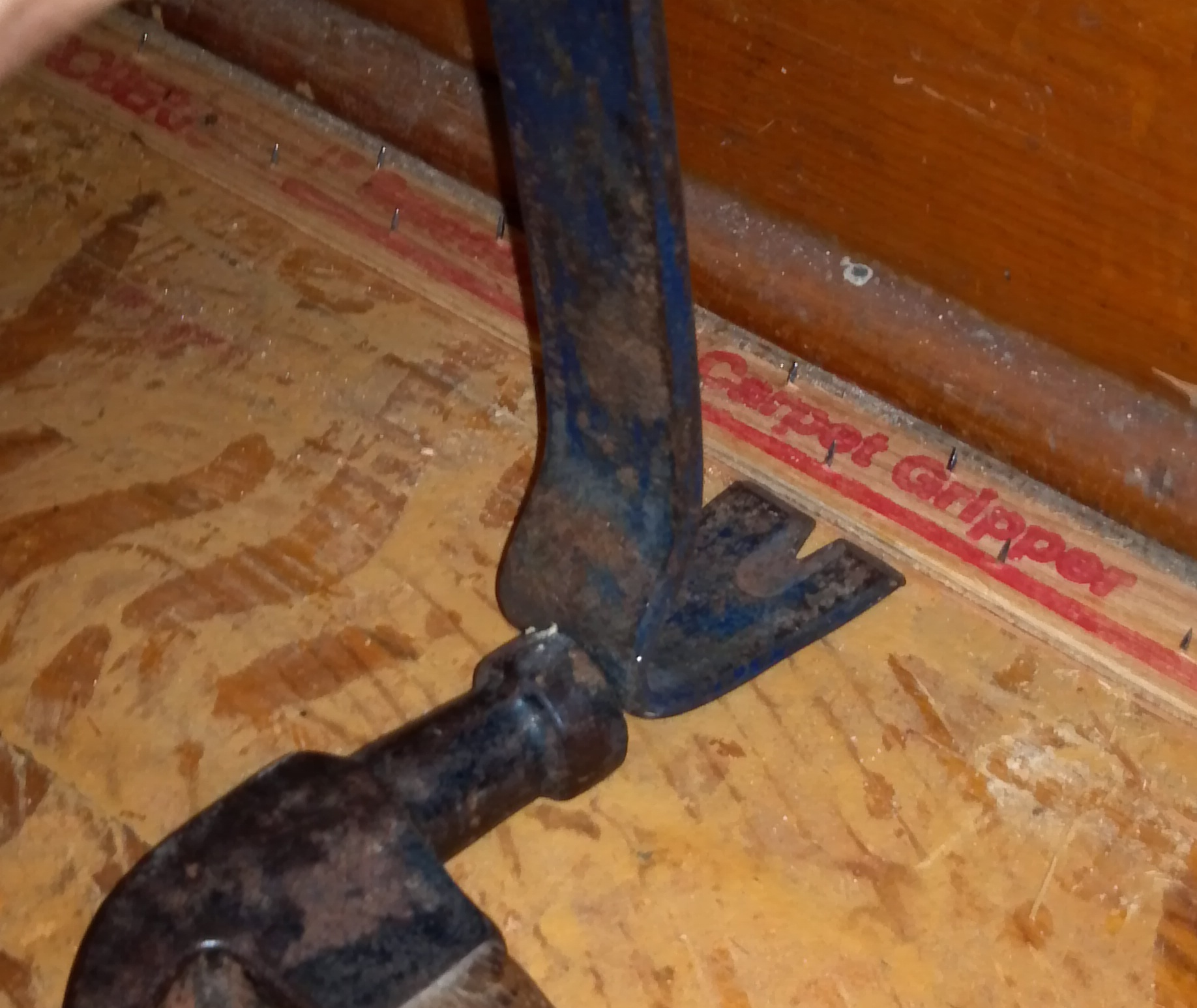
A "carpet gripper" tack strip, for a fitted carpet

The introduction of tack strip, "tackless strip", "gripper strip", or "Smoothedge" simplified the installation of wall-to-wall carpeting, increasing the neatness of the finish at the wall. Because gripper strips are essentially the same thickness as underlay, using gripper strips yields a level edge, whereas tacking gives an uneven edge.

There are three types of carpets: the loop pile carpet, the cut carpet and the structured carpet, combining the first two. Very popular in the sixties thanks to its colorful prints, most carpets took a decorative appearance inside houses.

== History ==
Thomas Sheraton wrote in 1806 that "since the introduction of carpets, fitted all over the floor of a room, the nicety of flooring anciently practiced in the best houses, is now laid aside". Fitted carpets, assembled from strips, had become popular by the second half of the 18th century, remaining so until the 1870s when loose carpets and varnished hardwood became the fashion.

One of the most famous carpets in history was given by Louis XVI to George Washington. It was woven for the banquet room of Mount Vernon, where it can still be admired today.

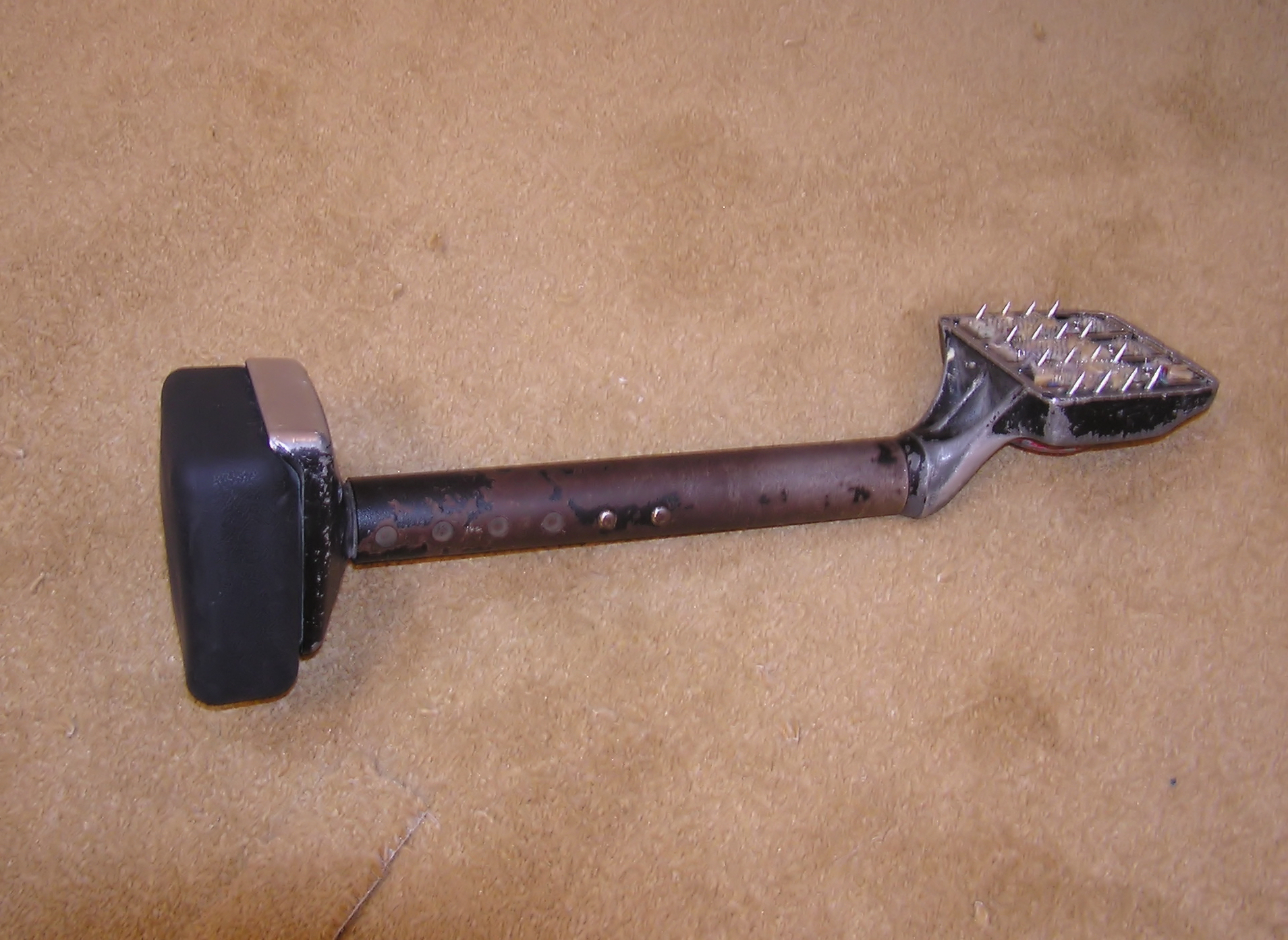
A manual carpet stretcher tool

In the early twentieth century, a new manufacturing method called "tufting" revolutionized the carpeting industry. Invented in Dalton, Georgia, it quickly replaced the traditional method of weaving. The pile yarns are stitched through a textile backing and coated on the underside of the coating. From 1930, the mechanization of tufting favored its development. It now represents 51% of total production while it amounted to only 10% in the 1950s.

== Fabrication ==
=== Tufted carpet ===
The tufted carpet is the most common manufacturing technique. It implies poking yarn tufts in a textile support close to a sewing machine. The carpet is then equipped with a folder (rewoven, jute, plastic or cotton) pasted on the back of the tuft. This technique makes possible the production of cut pile, curly or structured carpets.

=== Woven carpet ===
The woven carpet is one of the oldest manufacturing processes. It is woven like a carpet through a traditional weaving loom. The top and the back of the carpet are made simultaneously.

=== Needled carpet ===
From several superposed layers of fibers, the needling technique consists in hanging the fibers together through the use of special needles. The carpets obtained are very solid but intended for temporary use since they do not have the comfort of woven and tufted carpets.

=== Fibers ===
The different fibers constitute the carpet’s velvet. They have a direct impact on the physical properties of the floor they are covering such as resistance or longevity. There are three types of fiber: natural, coming from animals (wool), vegetable (seagrass, coir, sisal) and synthetic (polyamide or polypropylene). The wool was used for weaving carpets more than five centuries B.C before being predominantly used in the raw carpets' manufacture. However, synthetic fibers are predominantly used nowadays.
