= Stair rod =

Item used to hold carpeting on steps

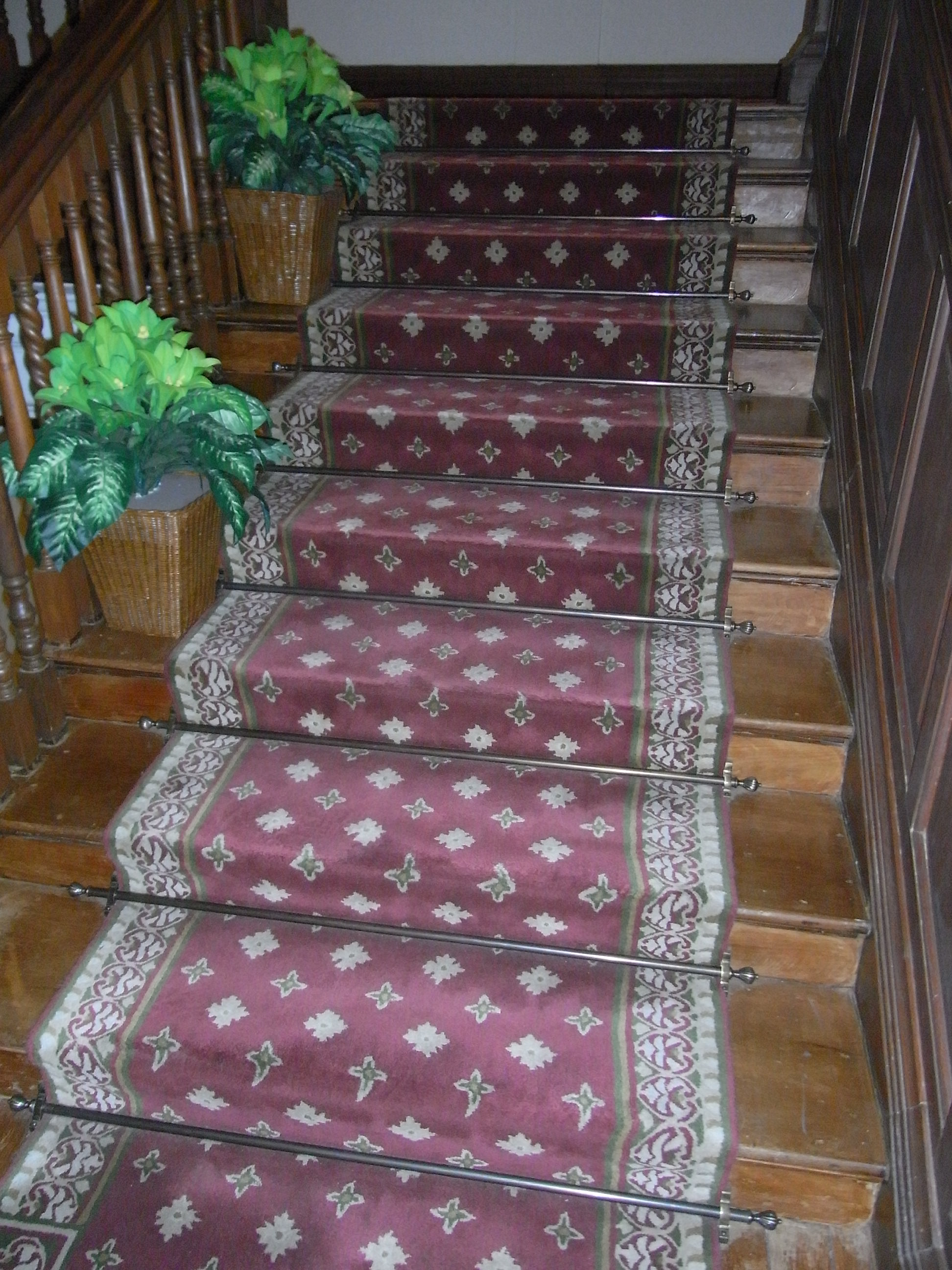
Carpet rods on stairs

A stair rod, also commonly referred to as a carpet rod, is an ornamental decorative hardware item used to hold carpeting in place on steps. (Such long but narrow strips of carpeting are known as carpet runners or stair runners or stair carpet). Traditionally, stair rods were used to hold a carpet runner in place on stairs, but with superior carpet installation techniques and more rigid safety standards today, stair rods serve primarily a decorative purpose. Stair rods are however still an integral part of many installation techniques. They hide dimples in the carpet runner caused by installation staples or nail heads and they are also often required to conceal a pattern mismatch when the carpet runner is cut during installation at each step where the tread meets the riser.

Stair rods consists of a long bar, either solid core or tube (hollow core), and brackets used to hold the bar in place. The brackets are installed on either side the carpet runner directly on the wood of the step. The brackets hold the bar that lies across the carpet runner firmly in place. A decorative finial end is commonly attached or integrated into the ends of the bar or attached to the outside of the brackets to give a more decorative and less industrial look.

Materials used in stair rods can be steel, iron, wood, aluminum, or brass. Today brass and brass-plated stair rods are generally considered to strike a perfect balance between strength, appearance, and value.

It is sometimes used as a metaphor for heavy rain, e.g. "It's raining stair rods". Thought to have its origins in the optical illusion of large, driving (wind blown) raindrops appearing to greatly elongate.
