= Stair carpet =

Carpet on a staircase

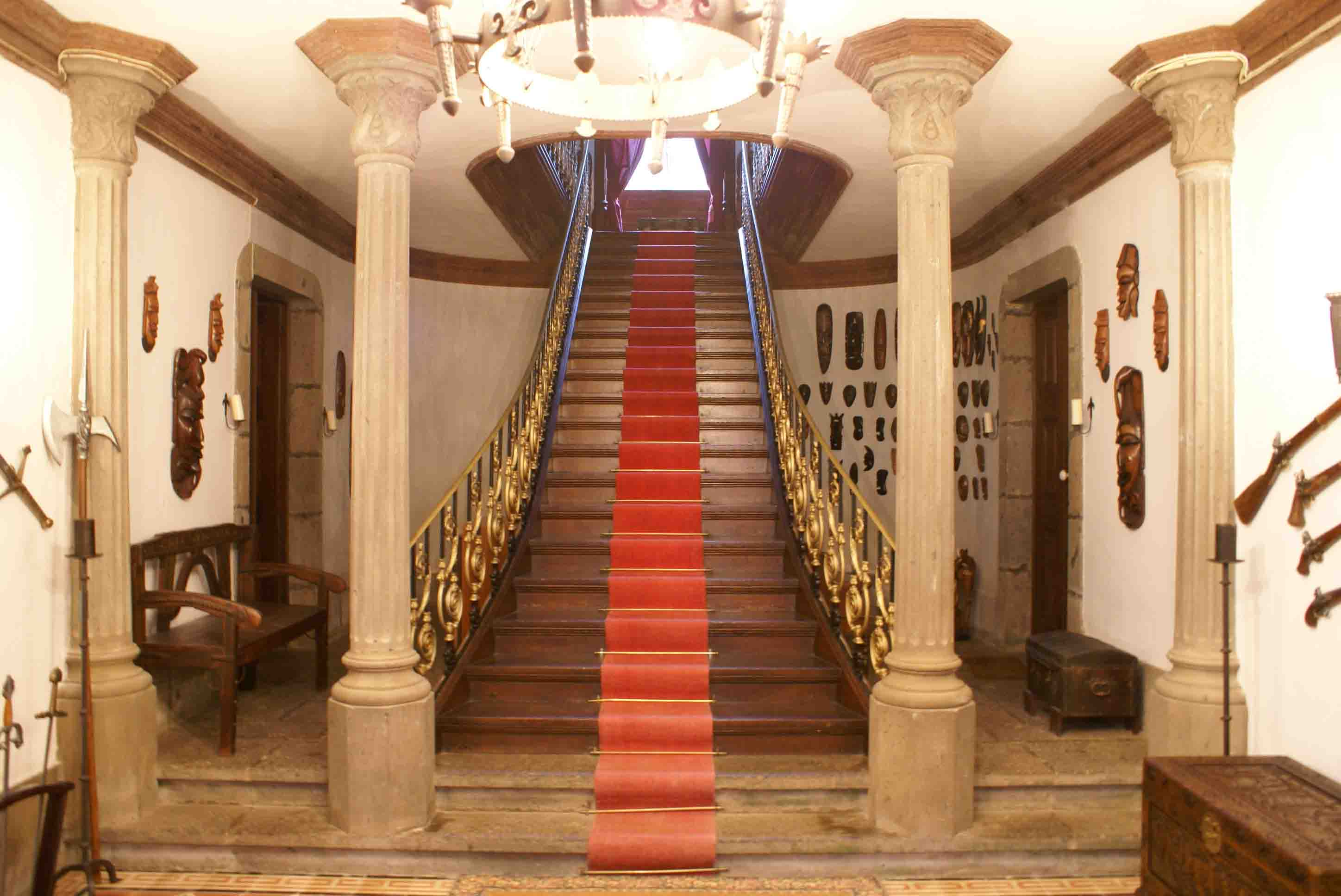
Staircase with a stair carpet, held with brass stair rods.

A stair carpet is a linear carpet or rug that usually runs up and down on interior staircases, and occasionally on exterior stairways.

== Description ==
Since 'wall to wall' fitted carpeting became very popular in the late 1950s, the word can now also describe a less notable design element than it traditionally did formerly.

A traditional stair carpet was characterized by not covering the full width of the stair but leaving the underlying wood−stone−tile of the tread and risers open to view on the sides. This was sometimes simply to save on carpet and sometimes to expose features while preventing wear to the underlying surface.

Typically, a stair carpet will become more hard-worn, since it gets a more forceful and 'sliding sole' footfall than flat floor carpets in rooms and hallways.

=== Attachment ===
A stair carpet may be held in place and fixed to the staircase by means of carpet tacks or a floor adhesive; and/or stair rods used at the base of the risers.

It is important that it is fixed securely to avoid accidental trips and slips.

== See also ==
- Stairs topics
- Architectural elements
