= Raining cats and dogs =

Idiom in English used to describe heavy rain

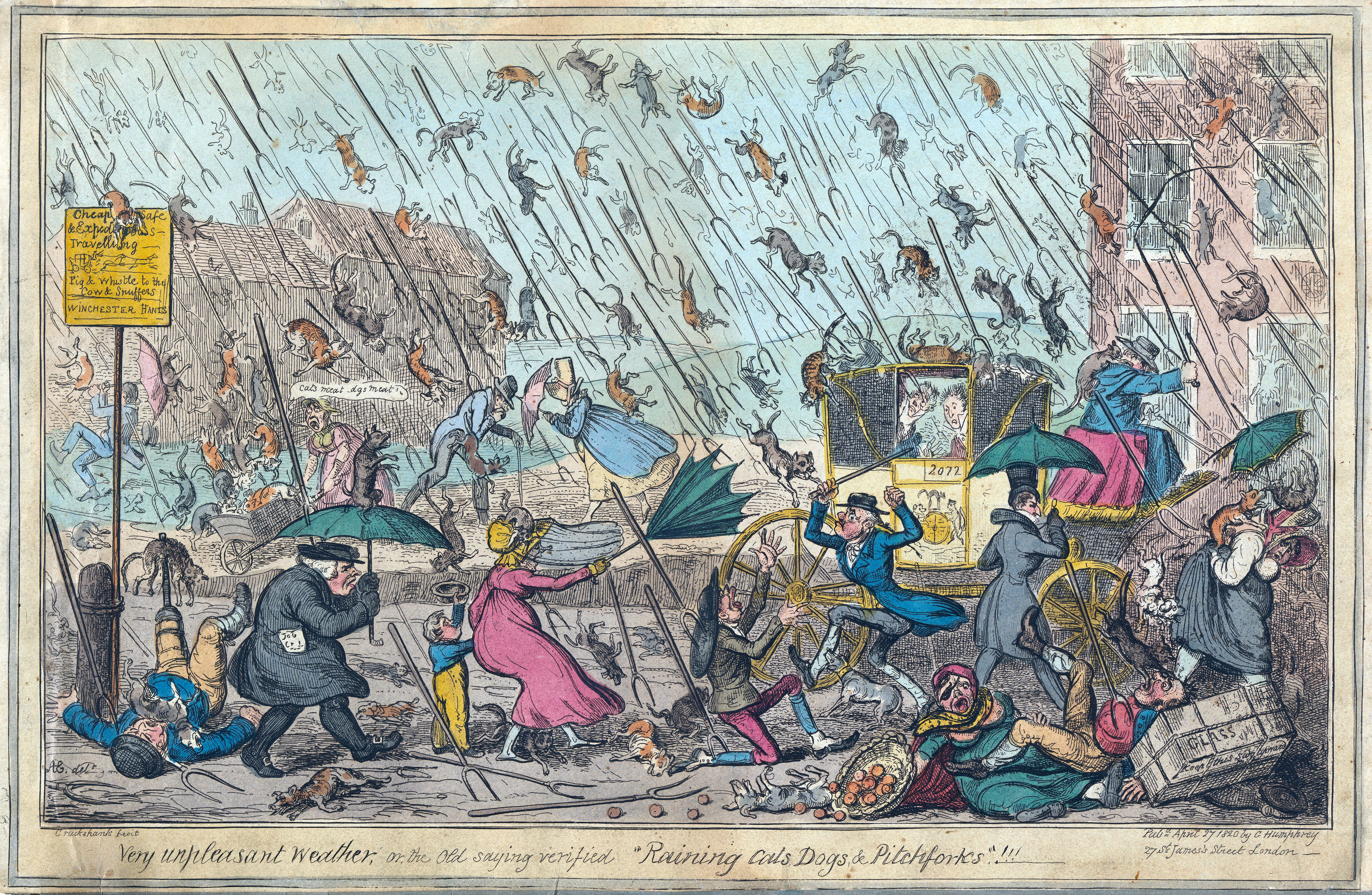
A 19th-century etching by George Cruikshank with the caption "Very unpleasant Weather, or The old saying verified "Raining Cats, Dogs & Pitchforks"!!! "

The English-language idiom "raining cats and dogs" or "raining dogs and cats" is used to describe particularly heavy rain. It is of unknown etymology and is not necessarily related to the raining animals phenomenon. The phrase (with "polecats" instead of "cats") has been used at least since the 17th century.

== Etymology ==
A number of possible etymologies have been put forward to explain the phrase.

One possible explanation involves the drainage systems on buildings in 17th-century Europe, which were poor and may have disgorged their contents, including the corpses of any animals that had accumulated in them, during heavy showers. This occurrence is described in Jonathan Swift's 1710 poem "Description of a City Shower":

Drowned puppies, stinking sprats, all drenched in mud,
Dead cats and turnip-tops come tumbling down the flood.

Another explanation is that "cats and dogs" may be a corruption of the Greek word Katadoupoi, referring to the waterfalls on the Nile, possibly through the old French word catadupe ('waterfall'). In Old English, catadupe meant a cataract or waterfall.

Anatoly Liberman mentioned that a possible candidate for the origin of the phrase could have been the Greek expression kata doxa, which means "contrary to experience or belief". However, he wrote that there is no evidence that the expression was borrowed by English speakers.

An online rumor largely circulated through email claimed that, in 16th-century Europe, animals could crawl into the thatch of peasant homes to seek shelter from the elements and would fall out during heavy rain. However, no evidence has been found in support of the claim.

Another possibility is the phrase is a truncated version of the 1592 sentence "Instead of thunderboltes shooteth nothing but dogboltes or catboltes". Dogbolts being a term for iron bolts for securing a door or gate and catbolts being a term for the bolts for fastening together pieces of timber.

There may not be a logical explanation; the phrase may have been used just for its nonsensical humor value, or to describe particularly heavy rainfall, like other equivalent English expressions ("raining pitchforks", "raining hammer handles").

== Equivalent expressions in other languages ==
Other languages have equally bizarre expressions for heavy rain.

Language	Expression	English translation
Afan Oromo	Waaqatu baqaqe	the sky got torn
Afrikaans	dit reën ou meide/vrouens/anties met knopkieries	it's raining old tribal women/women/aunts with knobsticks
Afrikaans	dit reën paddas en platannas	it's raining frogs and toads
Albanian	po bie litarë-litarë	[rain] is falling like ropes
Albanian	po bën Zoti shurrën	God is taking a piss
Albanian	po qan Zoti	God is crying
Bengali	মুষলধারে বৃষ্টি পড়ছে musholdhare brishṭi poṛchhe	rain is falling like pestles
Bosnian	padaju ćuskije	crowbars dropping
Bosnian	lije ko iz kabla	it's pouring like from a bucket
Cantonese	落狗屎	it's raining dog's poo
Chinese	傾盆大雨/倾盆大雨 qīngpén dàyǔ	it's pouring out of basins
Catalan	ploure a bots i barrals	raining boats and barrels
Croatian	padaju sjekire	axes dropping
Czech	padají trakaře	falling wheelbarrows
Czech	leje jako z konve	rains like from a watering can
Danish	regner skomagerdrenge	raining shoemakers' apprentices
Dutch	het regent pijpenstelen	raining pipe stems (or stair rods)
Dutch (Flemish)	het regent oude wijven	raining old women
Dutch (Flemish)	het regent kattenjongen	raining kittens
Estonian	sajab nagu oavarrest	raining like from a beanstalk
Estonian	kallab nagu ämbrist	raining as if poured from a bucket
Finnish	sataa kuin Esterin perseestä	raining like from Esteri's ass
Finnish	sataa kuin saavista kaatamalla	raining as if poured from a bucket
French	il pleut comme vache qui pisse	raining like a peeing cow
French	il pleut à seaux	raining buckets
French	il pleut des hallebardes	raining halberds
French	il pleut des clous	raining nails
French	il pleut des cordes	raining ropes
French	il pleut à boire debout	raining enough to drink standing
Georgian	კოკისპირული წვიმა kokispiruli tsvima	raining like water flows from a filled koka (koka: 'water measuring tableware, jar')
German	es schüttet wie aus Eimern	raining like poured from buckets
German	es regnet Bindfäden	raining strings
Greek	βρέχει καρεκλοπόδαρα vréchei kareklopódara	raining chair legs
Hebrew	גשם זלעפות	stormy/raging rain
Hindi	मुसलधार बारिश musaldhār bārish	rain like a pestle [onto a mortar]
Hungarian	mintha dézsából öntenék	like poured from a vat
Icelandic	Það rignir eins og hellt sé úr fötu	like poured from a bucket
Italian	piove a catinelle	it's pouring out of basins
Japanese	土砂降り doshaburi	earth and sand descending
Kannada	ಮುಸಲಧಾರೆ, ಕುಂಭದ್ರೋಣ ಮಳೆ	a stream of mallets
Italian	piove a catinelle	poured from a basin
Latin	urceatim pluebat	it rained from a basin
Latvian	līst kā no spaiņiem	it's raining like from buckets
Lithuanian	pila kaip iš kibiro	it's pouring like from a bucket
Malayalam	പേമാരി pemari	mad rain
Maltese	infetħu bwieb is-sema	the doors of the sky have opened
Marathi	मुसळधार पाउस	rain like a pestle [onto a mortar]
Nepali	मुसलधारे झरी	rain like a pestle [onto a mortar]
Norwegian	det regner trollkjerringer	raining she-trolls
Norwegian	det snør kattunger	it's snowing kittens
Odia	ମୂଷଳଧାରା ବର୍ଷା	rain like a pestle [onto a mortar]
Persian	شغال باران shoqal baran	raining jackals
Polish	leje jak z cebra	pouring like from a bucket
Polish	rzuca żabami	[the rain/it] is throwing frogs
Portuguese	está chovendo canivetes	raining penknives
Portuguese	está chovendo a potes	raining by the pot load
Portuguese	está chovendo a baldes	raining by the bucket load
Portuguese	está chovendo a cântaros	raining by the pitcher load
Portuguese	está chovendo a canecos	raining by a jug load
Portuguese	está a chover chouriços	it's raining chorizos
Portuguese (Brazil)	chovem cobras e lagartos	raining snakes and lizards
Portuguese (Brazil)	está caindo um pau-d'água	a stick of water is falling
Portuguese (Brazil)	está caindo um pé-d'água	a foot of water is falling
Punjabi	ਨਿਆਣੇ-ਕੁੱਟ ਮੀਂਹ	rain that beats kids
Romanian	plouă cu broaşte	raining frogs
Romanian	plouă de sparge	breaking with rain
Romanian	plouă cu găleata	raining from a bucket
Russian	льёт как из ведра	it's pouring like from a bucket
Scottish Gaelic	an t-uisge cho garbh ris na faochagan	the rain as rough as whelks
Scottish Gaelic	an dìle bhàite	the drowning deluge
Serbian	padaju sekire	axes are falling
Serbian	pada kao iz kabla	pouring like from a bucket
Sinhalese	නාකපන්න වහිනවා	raining cats and dogs
Spanish (Spain)	están lloviendo chuzos de punta	shortpikes/icicles point first
Spanish (Spain)	está lloviendo a cántaros	raining by the clay pot-full
Spanish (Spain)	está cayendo la del pulpo	(the rain) is hitting us like they hit an octopus
Spanish (Spain)	llueven sapos y culebras	raining toads and snakes
(Argentina)	caen soretes de punta	pointing down turds are falling
(Colombia)	estan lloviendo maridos	raining husbands
(Venezuela)	está cayendo un palo de agua	a stick of water is falling
Swedish	det regnar smådjävlar	raining little devils
Swedish	det regnar småspik	raining small nails
Swedish	regnet står som spön i backen	the rain stands like canes on the ground
Swedish	skyfall	sky fall
Tamil	பேய் மழை pei mazhi	ghost rain
Telugu	కుండపోత వర్షం	pouring like an inverted pot
Thai	ฝนตกไม่ลืมหูลืมตา fon dtok mai lʉʉm huu lʉʉm dtaa	raining without opening its eyes and ears
Turkish	bardaktan boşanırcasına	raining like poured from a cup
Ukrainian	лиє, як з відра	pouring like from a bucket
Urdu	موسلادھار بارش	rain like a pestle [on a mortar]
Vietnamese	mưa như trút nước/mưa trắng trời	raining as pouring a lot of water/white sky rain
Welsh	mae hi'n bwrw hen wragedd a ffyn	raining old ladies and sticks

== See also ==
- English-language idioms
- Rain of animals
