= River Solva =

River in Pembrokeshire, Wales

Coordinates: 51°52′25″N 5°11′20″W

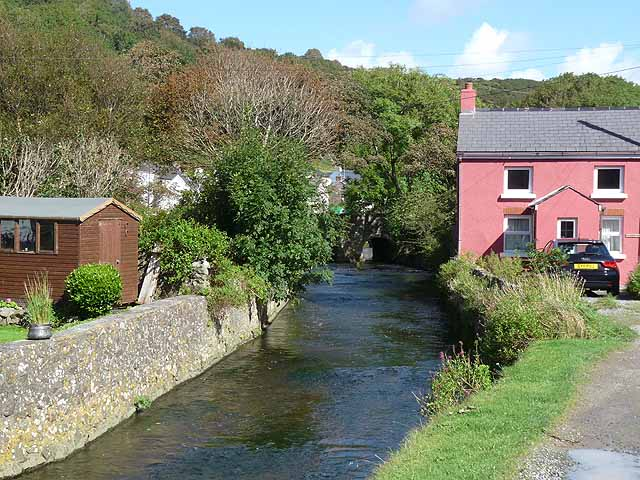
River Solva passing through Lower Solva with Solva Bridge visible in background

The River Solva (Welsh: Afon Solfach) is a small river in Pembrokeshire, Wales. Its source is a few hundred metres southeast of Croesgoch and flows ten miles before reaching Solva Harbour and St Brides Bay. It passes through mainly agricultural grazing land before reaching the small settlement of Middle Mill and finally the village of Solva.

The river is subject to frequent flood warnings and regularly bursts its banks, in particular flooding properties backing onto the river in Lower Solva.

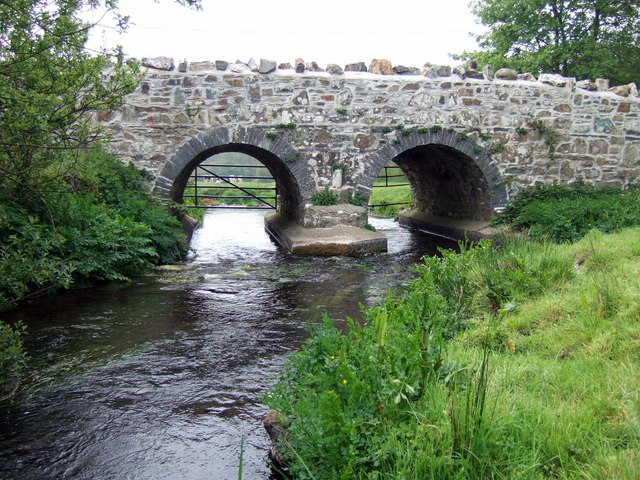
One of the first road crossings as Caerforiog

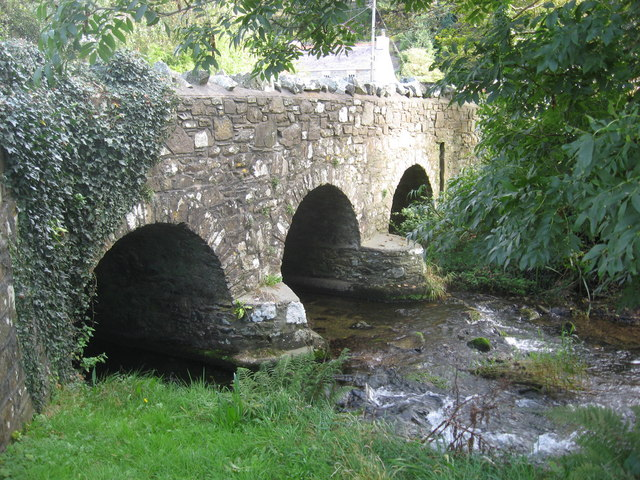
Road bridge at Middle Mill

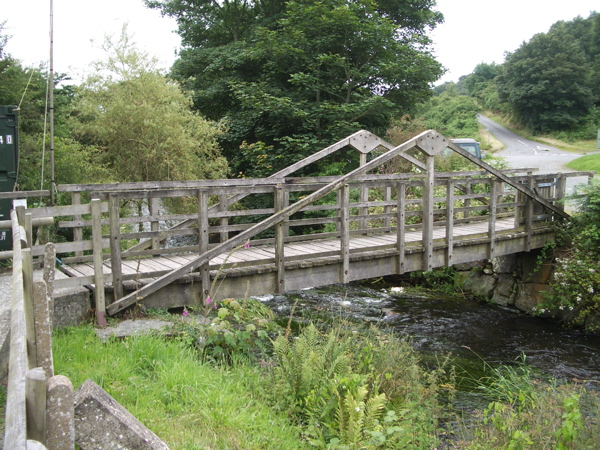
Foot bridge at Middle Mill

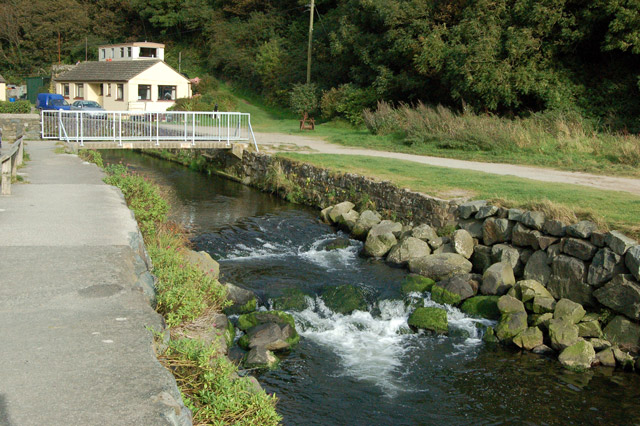
River channel at Lower Solva

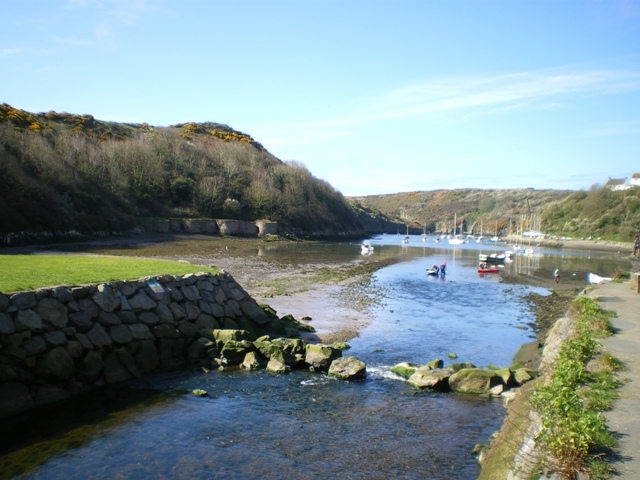
Entering Solva Harbour
