= Solva =

Village and community in Pembrokeshire, Wales

Solva: Welsh: Solfach
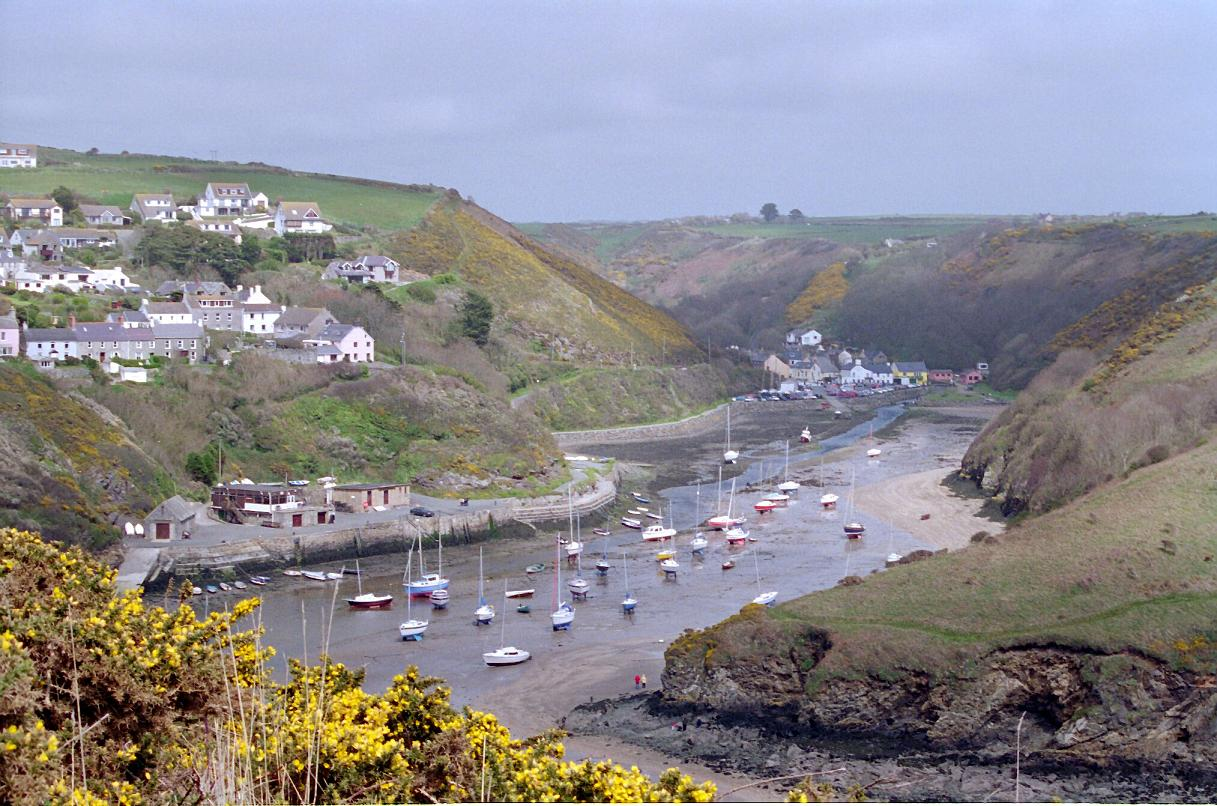

- Location within Pembrokeshire
- Population: 865 (2011 census)
- OS grid reference: SM802243
- Principal area: Pembrokeshire
- Preserved county: Dyfed
- Country: Wales
- Sovereign state: United Kingdom
- Post town: HAVERFORDWEST
- Postcode district: SA62
- Dialling code: 01437
- Police: Dyfed-Powys
- Fire: Mid and West Wales
- Ambulance: Welsh
- UK Parliament: Mid and South Pembrokeshire
- Senedd Cymru – Welsh Parliament: Ceredigion Penfro
- List of places UK Wales Pembrokeshire 51.874°N 5.194°W Map of the community

Solva (Welsh: Solfach) is a village, community and electoral ward in Pembrokeshire, Wales. The village comprises principally Lower Solva and Upper Solva. The community also includes Middle Mill and Whitchurch.

== Location ==
Solva lies on the north side of St Bride's Bay, in North Pembrokeshire in the Pembrokeshire Coast National Park and on the Pembrokeshire Coast Path. It lies on a deep valley at the mouth of the River Solva. In the valley is Lower Solva, consisting of a long street ending at the small harbour. Most of the modern development has been in Upper Solva, on the cliff top to the west of the harbour.

== History ==
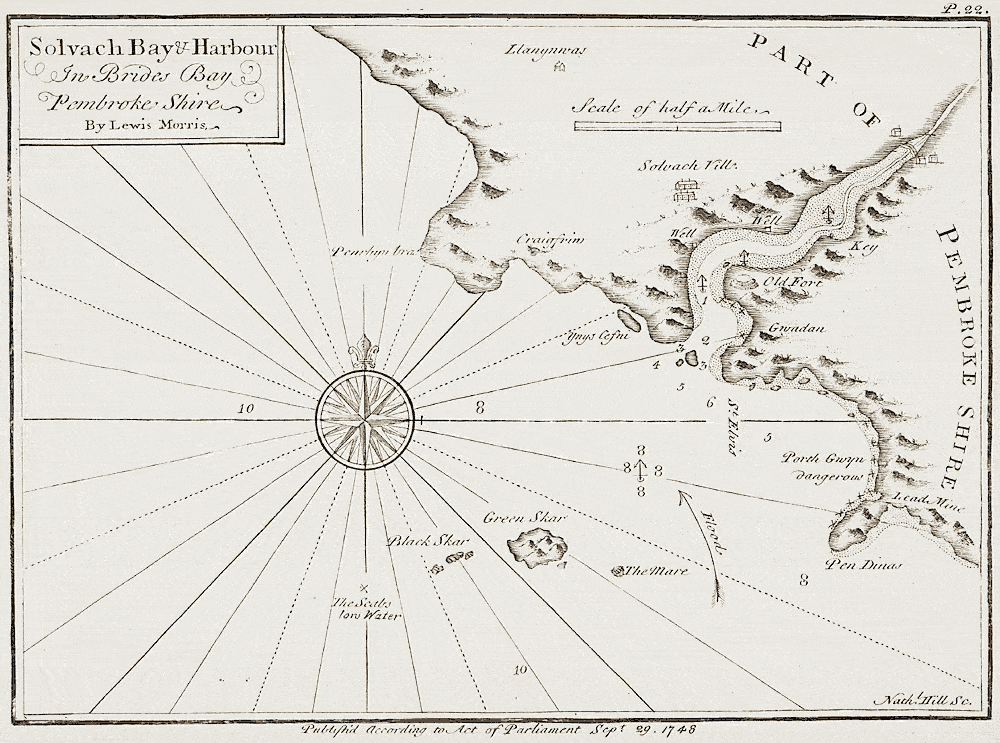
Solvach Bay and harbour, 1748

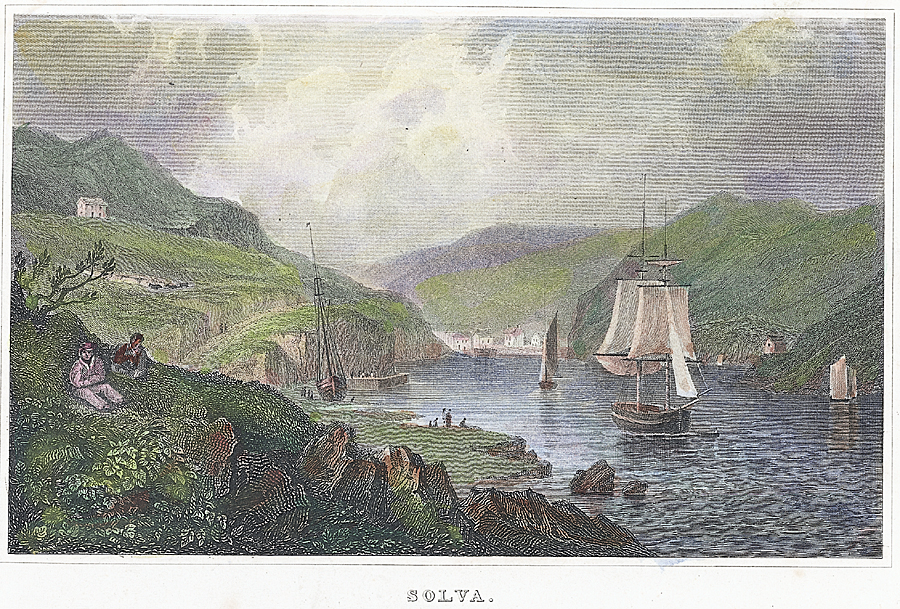
Solva c. 1830 by engraver Henry Gastineau

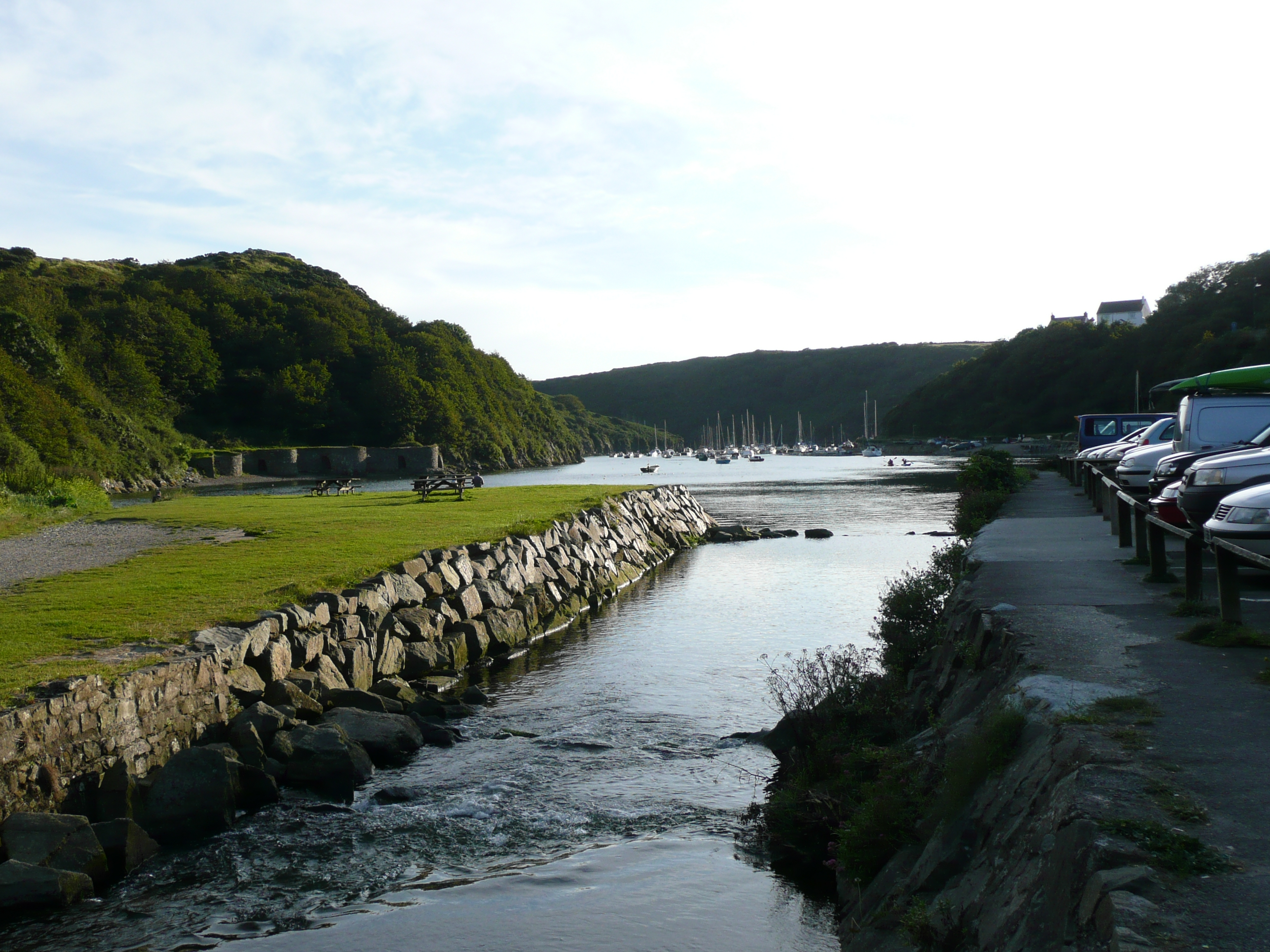
Solva Harbour showing Lime Kilns

The rocks at the entrance to Solva Harbour made it one of the most sheltered anchorages between Fishguard and Milford Haven; it was marked on a 1578 parish map of Pembrokeshire as Dolvath Haven. On a 1748 map it is named Solvach.

Solva became the main trading centre of St Bride's Bay in the medieval period, and was important for lime burning. A prominent row of lime kilns is preserved at the harbour edge. By the end of the 18th century Solva had begun to expand, and could accommodate vessels of 500 tons, or up to 1,000 in an emergency. Some 30 vessels were registered to the port at this time, though this number reduced during the 19th century, and during the 19th century, Solva had an RNLI lifeboat station. The fading coastal trade was replaced by tourism, and the harbour became a leisure boating centre.

In 1943 the RAF established an airfield, named RAF St Davids, which now lies within Solva community. The area was the subject of an archaeological survey in 2000.

The village was the location for Wales's first butterfly farm, Solva Nectarium, which opened in 1979.

== Demographics ==
The population of the community was 865 at the 2011 Census. As of 2019, it is estimated that the population has increased to 869.

According to the United Kingdom Census 2011, 30.7% of the community of Solva could speak Welsh.

The 2011 Census noted that 96.3% of the population was born in the United Kingdom; 54.7% of the population was born in Wales and 39.2% of the population was born in England.

== Geology ==
Solva Harbour is a good example of a ria — a flooded coastal valley or inlet. Local rocks contain fossils from the Cambrian period, and the village gives its name to the Solva Group, a rock sequence.

== Governance ==
An electoral ward of the same name exists. This ward extends to Brawdy and in fact some of the community was transferred there. The total population of the ward at the 2011 census was 1,877.

== Traditional events ==
Every year on Easter Monday Solva hosts a Duck Race for charity. The ducks are released into the River Solva near Middle Mill and float down stream to Solva harbour. The winner is the first to cross under the footbridge in lower Solva car park.

Each summer, Solva hosts a regatta which features rowing for adults and children.

Solva now hosts its own festival each year, this being held at the end of July or the beginning of August. The festival is called 'The Edge Festival Solva', and profits go to community-based projects.

== Amenities and attractions ==
The local cliff coast is popular with walkers, and the classic cliff exposures of Cambrian rocks attract amateur and professional geologists.

Solva Woollen Mill, located at the nearby village of Middle Mill, claims to be the oldest continuously working woollen mill in Pembrokeshire. Today the mill mostly manufactures carpets and rugs. There is a tearoom and a shop, and visitors are able to see the looms at work.

== Listed structures ==
There are 37 listed structures in the community, including the church (of Whitchurch parish) of Saint Aidan.

== Notable people ==
- Frances Hodgkins (1869–1947), a New Zealand painter, painted in Solva in 1936 and 1938, commenting in a letter to a friend in 1936:
  I have been working moderately hard, moderately successful in a landscape of steep valleys speedy rivers & castles looking like their own mountains but it takes a long long time to acquire a little idiom & rhythm in paint – if ever – Such nice gentle people I was among at Solva, mostly bird watchers & such all terribly poor.
- Meic Stevens (born 1942), the notable Welsh singer/songwriter, was born in Solva, and spent much of his early life here. In 2002 he released a song and album called Ysbryd Solfa ("The Spirit of Solfa") which contained songs about his childhood in Solva.
- David Gray (born 1968) musician, moved with his parents to Solva at the age of 8, and attended Solva Community School. His parents ran the "Window on Wales" craft shop in the village.
- Simon Davies (born 1979), former footballer with 368 club caps who played for Fulham and represented Wales 58 times, was brought up in Solva. His career started as a teenager at Solva AFC, and it was here that he was talent-spotted.

== TV and film ==
In June 2014 Solva was used as a location for the filming of Dylan Thomas's Under Milk Wood.

== Images of Solva ==
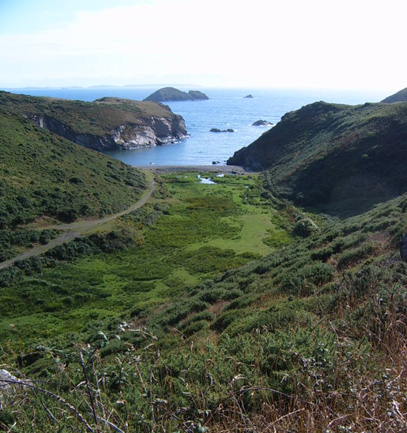
Clifftop walk Solva

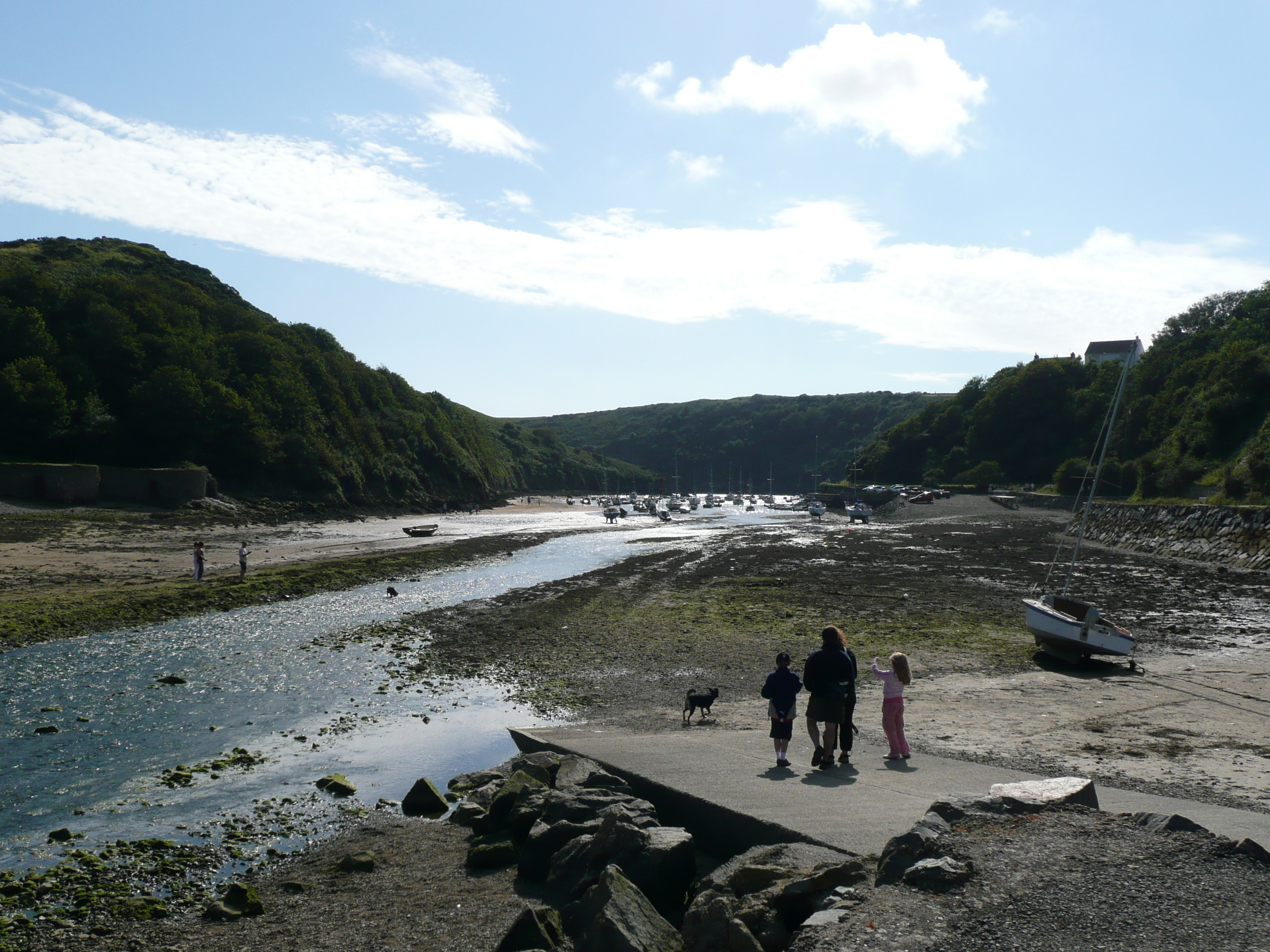
Summer evening at low tide in Solva

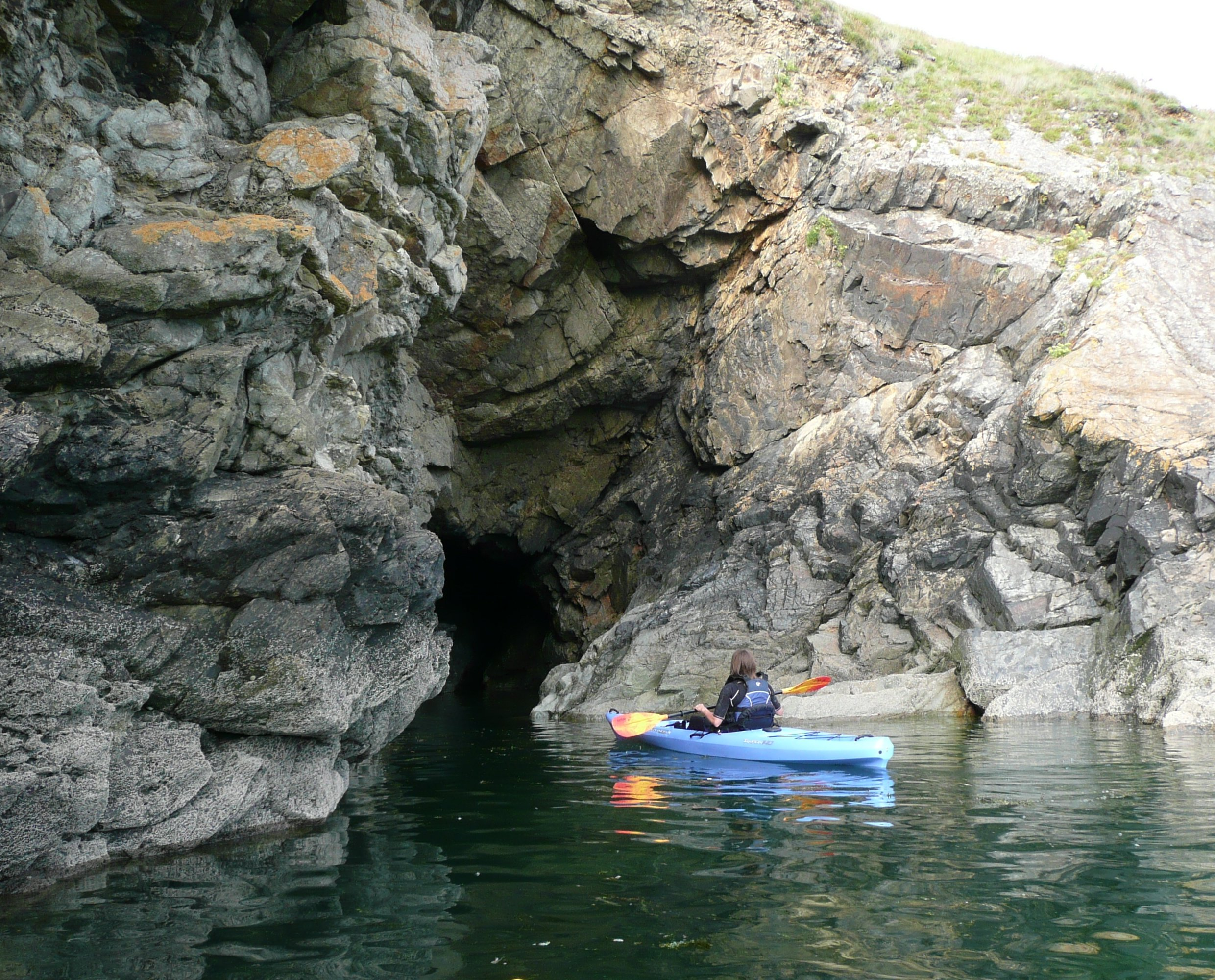
Kayaking in caves at the mouth of Solva Harbour

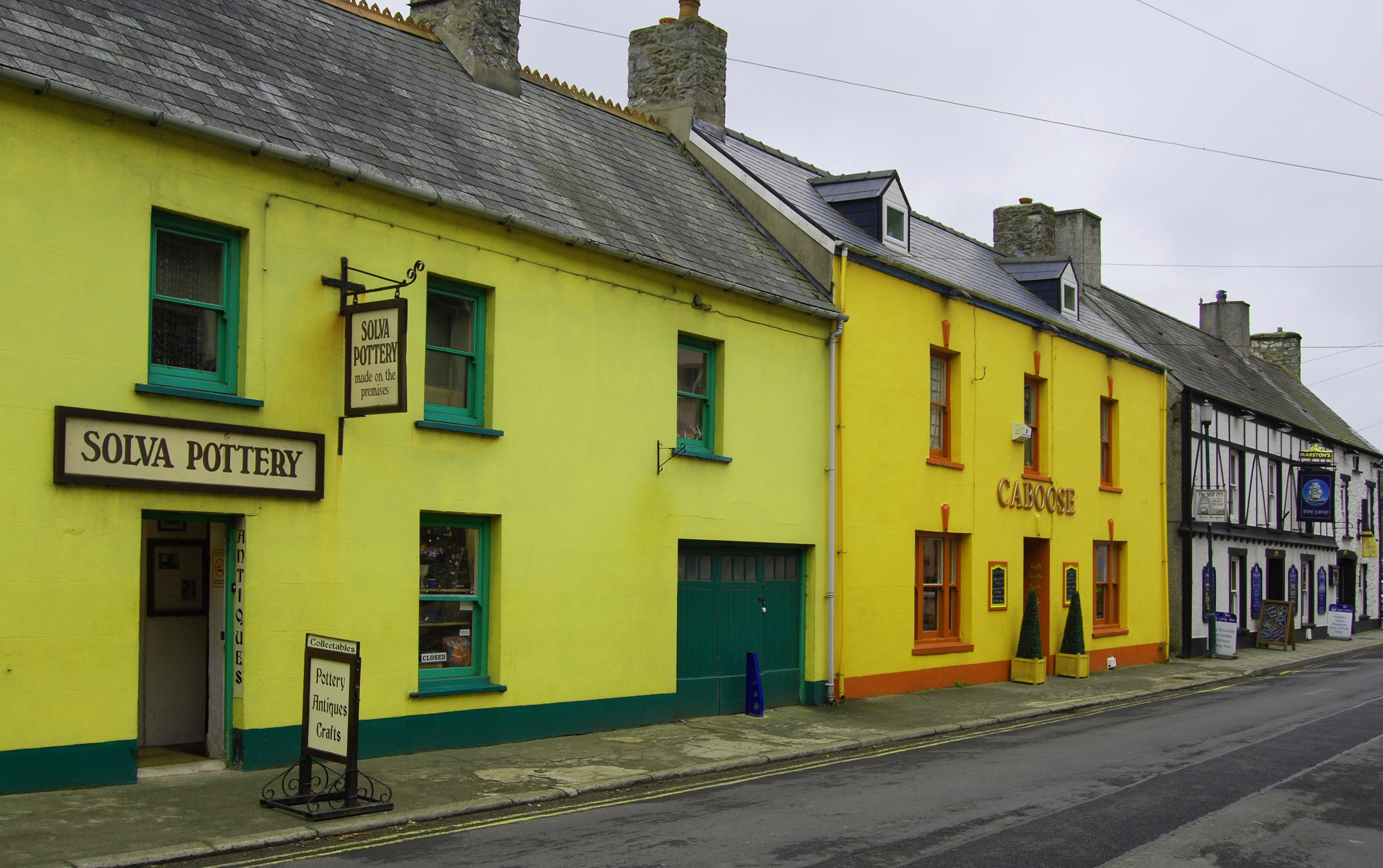
Colourful houses in Solva
